= List of old-growth forests in Massachusetts =

The following is a list of old-growth forests in the Commonwealth of Massachusetts.

Old growth is defined as those forests that have not been logged (and have not been significantly disturbed by human beings) in the last 150 years. "Virgin forests" are those old-growth forests that show no sign of having ever been logged. Massachusetts' old growth occurs almost entirely within the Northeastern Highlands ecoregion. The following list identifies some of the sites and their locations:

== List ==
Name	Location	County	Size (ha)	Coordinates	Elevation (m)	Aspect
Burgoyne Pass	Beartown State Forest	Berkshire	1.2	42°16′3″N 73°17′8″W	390-470	S–SW
Ice Gulch	East Mountain State Forest	Berkshire	3.6	42°9′30″N 73°19′18″W	405–440	SE–SW
Cold River: Route 2 to Black Brook	Mohawk Trail State Forest/Cold River Virgin Forest	Franklin	38.4	42°38′7″N 72°58′48″W	350–420	NW–NE
Cold River: Route 2 to Black Brook Picnic Area	Mohawk Trail State Forest/Cold River Virgin Forest	Franklin	14.2	42°37′48″N 72°58′0″W	320–450	N–NW
Lower Gulf Brook	Mohawk Trail State Forest	Franklin	6.1	42°37′53″N 72°59′52″W	380–415	NW
Manning Brook	Mohawk Trail State Forest	Franklin	6.1	42°38′23″N 72°59′20″W	375–420	NE
Black Brook	Mohawk Trail State Forest	Franklin	10.1	42°37′45″N 72°58′12″W	360–500	N–NW
Tannery Falls	Mohawk Trail State Forest	Franklin	3.6	42°37′39″N 73°0′12″W	390–420	NW
Todd and Clark Mountains	Mohawk Trail State Forest	Franklin	80.9	42°38′50″N 72°56′45″W	330–460	Varied
Trout Brook West	Mohawk Trail State Forest	Franklin	6.1	42°37′57″N 72°56′19″W	410–450	E
Hawks Mountain	Mohawk Trail State Forest	Franklin	2	42°37′45″N 72°55′34″W	360–410	NW
Thumper Mountain	Mohawk Trail State Forest	Franklin	0.8	42°38′23″N 72°56′6″W	250–270	NE
Middle Cold River to Route 2	Mohawk Trail State Forest / Savoy Mountain State Forest	Franklin/Berkshire	18.2	42°38′3″N 72°59′29″W	360–415	N
Upper Cold River	Mohawk Trail State Forest / Savoy Mountain State Forest	Franklin/Berkshire	32.4	42°39′7″N 73°1′0″W	390–450	Varied
Upper Gulf Brook	Mohawk Trail State Forest / Savoy Mountain State Forest	Franklin/Berkshire	8.1	42°37′59″N 73°0′43″W	380–415	NE
Bear Swamp	Monroe State Forest	Franklin/Berkshire	12.1	42°41′50″N 72°57′31″W	360–480	E
Dunbar Brook	Monroe State Forest	Franklin/Berkshire	8.1	42°42′14″N 72°58′8″W	390–490	NE
Parsonage Brook	Monroe State Forest	Franklin/Berkshire	1.6	42°42′44″N 72°58′46″W	470–510	NW
Spruce Mountain	Monroe State Forest	Franklin/Berkshire	1.6	42°42′52″N 72°59′56″W	600–670	SE
Smith Brook-Deerfield River	Monroe State Forest	Franklin/Berkshire	1.6	42°41′58″N 72°58′56″W	360–450	NE
Hunt Hill	Monroe State Forest	Franklin/Berkshire	2.8	42°41′25″N 72°58′53″W	520–600	SE
Mount Everett-Glen Brook	Mount Everett State Reservation	Berkshire	14.2	42°6′37″N 73°25′32″W	490–560	NE
Mount Everett-Guilder Pond	Mount Everett State Reservation	Berkshire	1.6	42°6′36″N 73°26′22″W	610–630	SW
The Hopper	Mount Greylock State Reservation	Berkshire	46.5	42°39′2″N 73°9′58″W	540–720	Varied
Stony Ledge	Mount Greylock State Reservation	Berkshire	4	42°38′54″N 73°11′34″W	675–720	NE
Mount Williams	Mount Greylock State Reservation	Berkshire	10.1	42°40′32″N 73°9′59″W	510–600	NW–NE
Roaring Brook	Mount Greylock State Reservation	Berkshire	10.1	42°37′44″N 73°12′5″W	550–630	N–NW
Mount Wachusett	Wachusett Mountain State Reservation	Worcester	80.9	42°29′0″N 71°53′0″W	425–520	Varied
Bash Bish Falls	Mount Washington State Forest	Berkshire	15.4	42°6′47″N 73°29′43″W	415–485	N–NE
Mount Race	Mount Washington State Forest	Berkshire	2	42°4′39″N 73°25′47″W	645–710	Varied
Sages Ravine-Bear Rock Falls	Mount Washington State Forest	Berkshire	4.9	42°3′18″N 73°26′4″W	350–420	N
Alander Mountain	Mount Washington State Forest	Berkshire	2	42°5′7″N 73°28′48″W	585–610	SW
The Rivulet	William Cullen Bryant Homestead	Hampshire	80	42°28′16″N 72°56′26″W	373-446	
Windsor Jambs	Windsor State Forest	Berkshire	1.2	42°31′20″N 72°59′35″W	430–475	SW

== See also ==
- List of National Natural Landmarks in Massachusetts
- List of Massachusetts State Parks
