= Mount Race =

Mountain in Massachusetts, U.S.

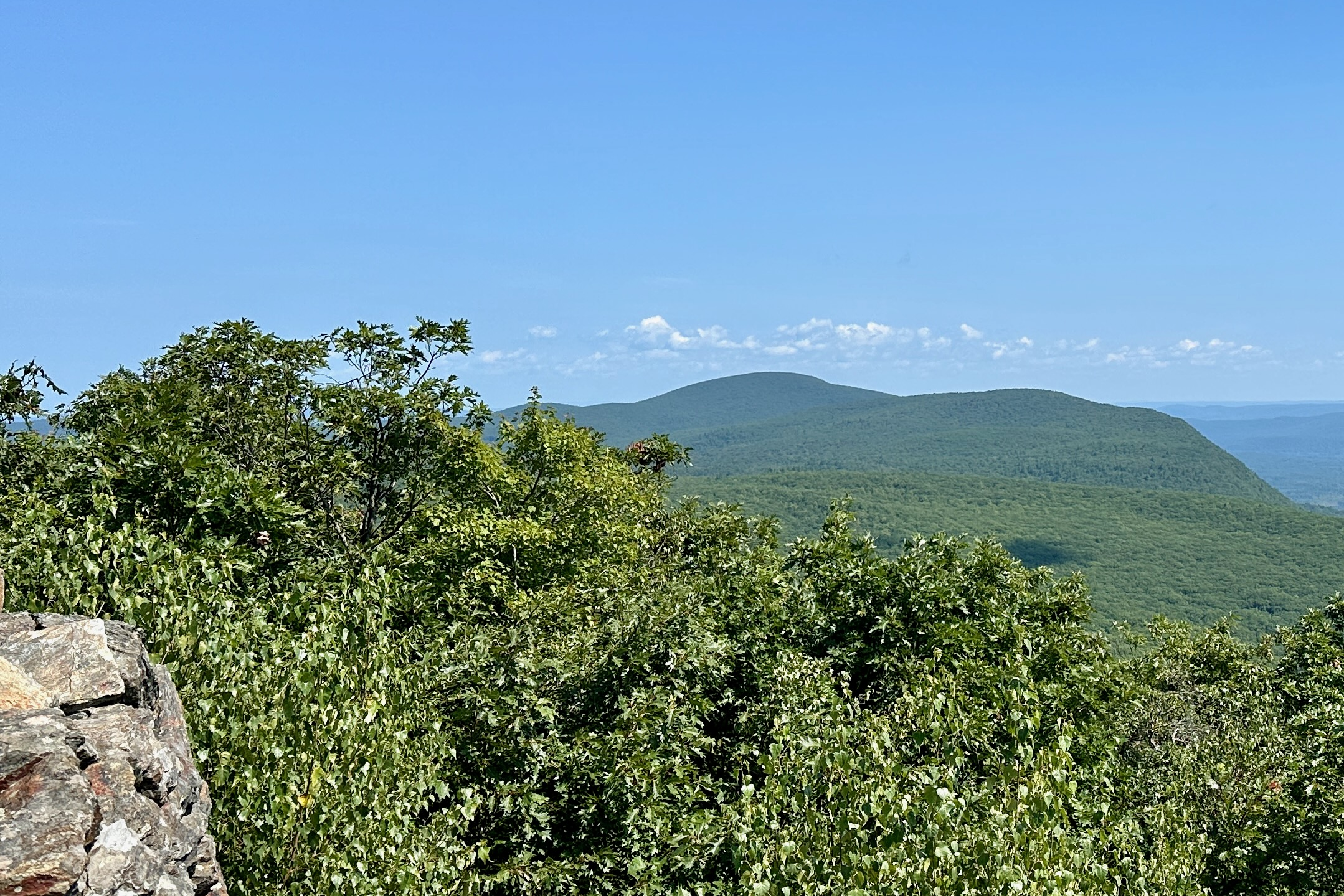
- View of Mount Everett and Mount Race from Bear Mountain

Highest point
- Elevation: 2,365 ft (721 m)
- Prominence: 453 ft (138 m)
- Coordinates: 42°04′57″N 73°25′56″W

Geography
- Location: Southwest Berkshire County, Massachusetts
- Parent range: Taconic Mountains

Geology
- Rock age: Ordovician
- Mountain type(s): Thrust fault; metamorphic rock

Climbing
- Easiest route: Race Brook Falls Trail and Appalachian Trail

Mount Race, 2,365 feet (721 m), is a mountain in Berkshire County, Massachusetts. It shares many characteristics with the slightly higher Mount Everett about a mile to the north. Part of the Taconic Mountains, Race is known for its waterfalls, an eastern escarpment of nearly 2,000 feet, and expansive views. The Appalachian Trail crosses its summit, which has an open forest of dwarf pitch pine and scrub oak.

== Details ==
Both Race Brook Falls and Bear Rock Falls spill from the steep eastern slopes of Mount Race, the summit of which is part of a divide between the Hudson and Housatonic rivers. The peak bears the surname of William Race, a local resident killed in 1755 by agents of Livingston Manor in a colonial border dispute concerning ownership and farm tenancy.

Western slopes are in the town of Mount Washington, and the east slopes are in Sheffield, Massachusetts. Much of the mountain is part of Mount Washington State Forest; other parcels are privately held.

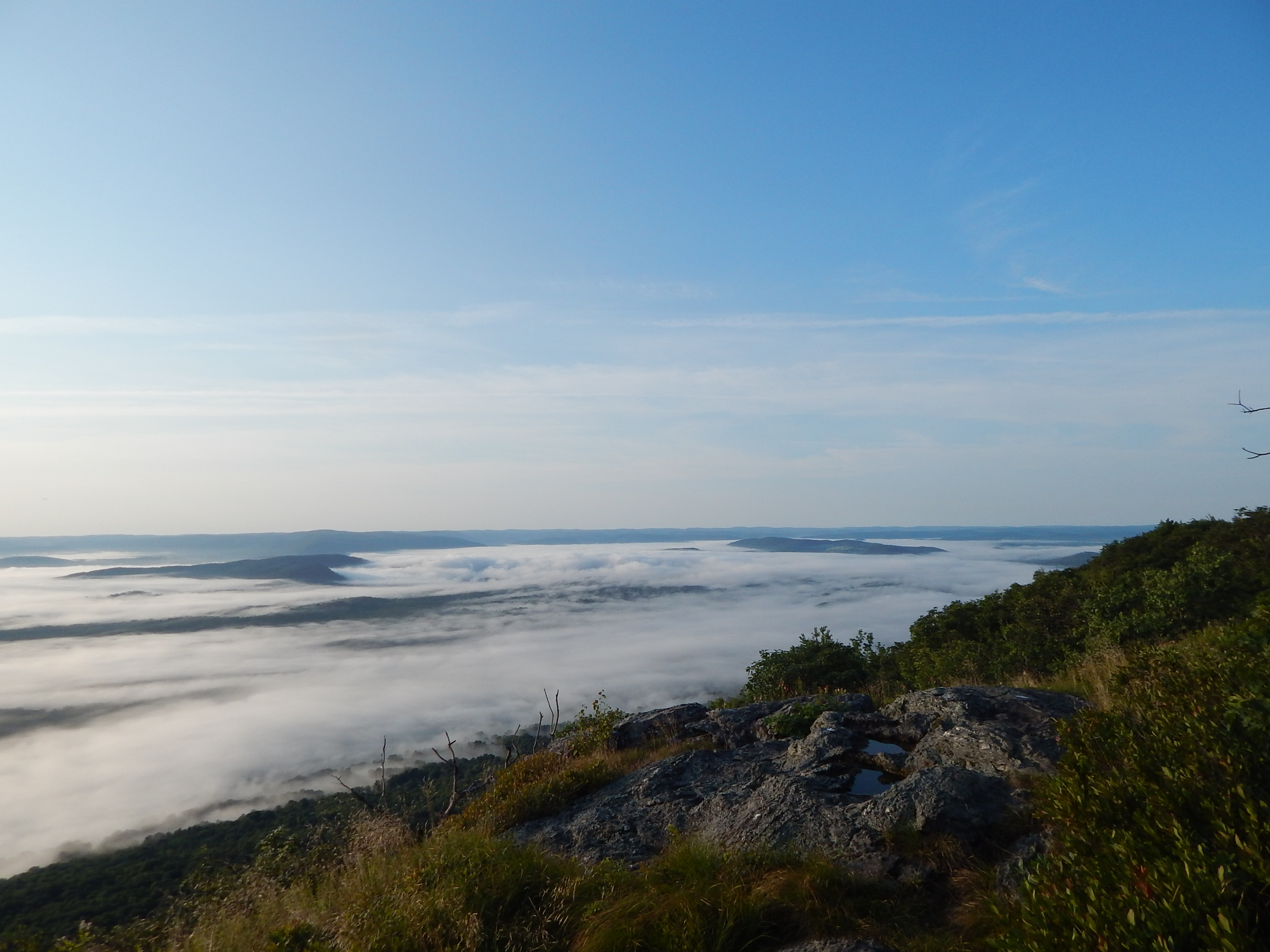
View from Mount Race

== See also ==
- List of old growth forests in Massachusetts

== Sources ==
- Massachusetts Trail Guide (2004). Boston: Appalachian Mountain Club.
