= Cold River Virgin Forest =

Forest in Massachusetts, United States

- Location within Massachusetts
- Location: Berkshire, Franklin, Massachusetts, United States
- Coordinates: 42°38′48″N 72°56′47″W

Cold River Virgin Forest a virgin hemlock-northern hardwood forest in northwestern Massachusetts, United States. Spanning approximately 348 acres, it is believed to be the only stand of its type in New England, it was designated a National Natural Landmark by the National Park Service in April 1980.

It is located within Mohawk Trail State Forest nine miles southeast of North Adams in Berkshire and Franklin counties. The forest features hemlocks and sugar maples exceeding 400 years in age.

== See also ==
- List of National Natural Landmarks in Massachusetts
- List of Massachusetts State Parks
- List of old growth forests in Massachusetts
