= Berkshire Natural Resources Council =

Coordinates: 42°26′51.9″N 73°15′12.6″W

- Abbreviation: BRNC
- Formation: 1967; 59 years ago
- Type: Nonprofit
- Tax ID no.: 04-2430091
- Legal status: 501(c)(3)
- Headquarters: Lenox, Massachusetts
- Board Chair: Timothy T. Crane
- President: Jenny Hansell
- Website: https://www.bnrc.org/

The Berkshire Natural Resources Council (BNRC) is a non-profit land conservation and environmental advocacy organization formed in 1967 that protects and maintains more than 50 properties and 10,000 acres (4,000 ha) of conservation restrictions around the Berkshires in western Massachusetts. The mission of the BNRC is "to protect and preserve the natural beauty and ecological integrity of the Berkshires for public benefit and enjoyment."

BNRC has been active in preserving natural landscapes and resources on Mount Greylock, Yokun Ridge, and the South Taconic Range. It maintains hiking trails at its Steven's Glen preserve in West Stockbridge, Basin Pond in Lee, Olivia's Lookout in Lenox, and Bob's Way in Monterey, Massachusetts. It has also been active in advocating for environmental protection and remediation of the Housatonic River watershed.
