= Cedar Swamp (disambiguation) =

A cedar swamp is a kind of coniferous swamp. Cedar swamp may refer to:

- Acushnet Cedar Swamp, Massachusetts
- Cedar Swamp, South Carolina
- Cedar Swamp Archeological District, Massachusetts
- Cedar Swamp Covered Bridge, Vermont
- Cedar Swamp Creek, New Jersey
- Cedar Swamp River, Massachusetts
- Cedar Swamp Wildlife Area, Delaware
