= List of National Natural Landmarks in Massachusetts =

The National Park Service has designated twelve National Natural Landmarks in Massachusetts. Most of these are bogs, swamps, wetlands and old-growth forest.

Massachusetts National Natural Landmarks (clickable map)

Name	Image	Date	Location	County	Ownership	Description
Acushnet Cedar Swamp		June 1972	New Bedford 41.692222°N 70.959722°W	Bristol	State	One of the state's largest, wildest and most impenetrable swamps, and an outstanding example of the diversity of conditions and species in the glaciated section of the oak-chestnut forest.
Bartholomew's Cobble		October 1971	Ashley Falls 42.057222°N 73.350833°W	Berkshire	Private (The Trustees of Reservations)	Contains over 800 plant species, including North America's greatest diversity of ferns.
Cold River Virgin Forest		April 1980	Mohawk Trail State Forest 42.646667°N 72.946389°W	Berkshire, Franklin	State	Probably the only virgin hemlock-northern hardwood forest in New England, with the hemlocks and sugar maples exceeding 400 years in age.
Fannie Stebbins Refuge		June 1972	Longmeadow 42.039468°N 72.602584°W	Hampden	Municipal	The area contains the only sizeable example of Connecticut River flood plain under preservation, exhibiting many successional stages including upland and flood plain forest, swamp, marsh, ponds, and meadows.
Gay Head Cliffs		October 1975	Aquinnah 41.334444°N 70.795833°W	Dukes	Native lands (Wampanoag Tribe of Gay Head)	An unusual cross section of Raritan and Magothy sediments of Cretaceous age and fossil-bearing sands of Miocene and either Pliocene or Pleistocene ages that rise as much as 150 feet (46 m) above sea level, resting on the continental shelf and detached from the mainland. The center of Wampanoag native culture.
Hawley Bog		May 1974	Hawley 42.575807°N 72.890564°W	Franklin	Private	Unspoiled cold northern boreal sphagnum-heath bog occupying an old shallow glacial lake basin which demonstrates bog succession from the central open water pond to the surrounding spruce-fir forest.
Mt. Greylock Old Growth Spruce		November 1987	Adams 42.637455°N 73.166216°W	Berkshire	State	This site contains three separate stands of undisturbed old growth red spruce on the northwest slopes of Mount Greylock, the highest mountain in Massachusetts. These stands have been undisturbed for at least 150–180 years, and may be virgin. No other old growth red spruce stands are known in southern New England, while only a few comparable or better sites occur in northern New England.
Muskeget Island		April 1980	west of Tuckernuck and Nantucket Islands 41.335278°N 70.304167°W	Nantucket	Municipal, Private	The only known locality where the Muskeget beach vole is found, and southernmost station where the gray seal breeds. The area supports an enormous nesting population of herring gulls and black-backed gulls.
Nantucket Barrier Beach and Wildlife Refuge		December 2024	Nantucket 41.3662°N 70.0221°W	Nantucket	Federal, Private	Prime example of Atlantic Coastal Plain rhythmic and symmetrical cuspate forelands (also the largest of their kind in the Outer Lands), and a good representation of the marine ecology that inhabits this type of oceanic topography.
North and South Rivers		May 1977	Norwell 42.1604°N 70.7141°W	Plymouth	State, Municipal, Private	Classic examples of drowned river-mouth estuaries, supporting at least 45 species of fish and many species of birds. The site contains salt marsh, brackish marsh, and freshwater marsh areas.
Poutwater Pond		June 1972	Holden 42.424722°N 71.83825°W	Worcester	State	An undisturbed sphagnum-heath bog in southern New England, illustrating ecological succession from open water in a glacial depression to upland forest.
Reedy Meadow (was Lynnfield Marsh)		June 1972	Between Wakefield and South Lynnfield	Essex	Municipal	The largest freshwater cattail marsh in Massachusetts. The area preserves the habitat requirements of many bird species and serves as a breeding ground for the king rail and least bittern, rare species in the region.

== See also ==
- List of Massachusetts state parks
- List of National Historic Landmarks in Massachusetts
