= Acushnet Cedar Swamp =

Swamp in Massachusetts, USA

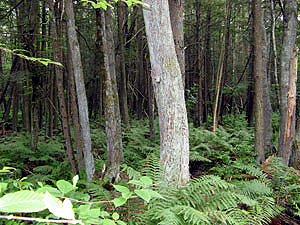
- Acushnet Cedar Swamp

- Location within Massachusetts
- Location: Bristol County, Massachusetts
- Nearest city: New Bedford
- Coordinates: 41°41′32″N 70°57′35″W
- Area: 1,100 acres (450 ha)

U.S. National Natural Landmark
- Designated: 1972

Acushnet Cedar Swamp is a 1,100-acre (450 ha) swamp located in Bristol County, Massachusetts. It is managed by the Massachusetts Department of Environmental Protection. In 1972, Acushnet Cedar Swamp was designated as a National Natural Landmark by the National Park Service. The New Bedford Regional Airport borders the swamp to the south.

It is one of the State's largest, wildest and most impenetrable swamps, and an outstanding example of the diversity of conditions and species in the glaciated section of the oak-chestnut forest.

== See also ==
- List of National Natural Landmarks in Massachusetts
- List of Massachusetts State Parks
- List of old growth forests in Massachusetts
