= Bear Swamp =

Parkland in Ashfield, Massachusetts

Coordinates: 42°32′55″N 72°49′33″W

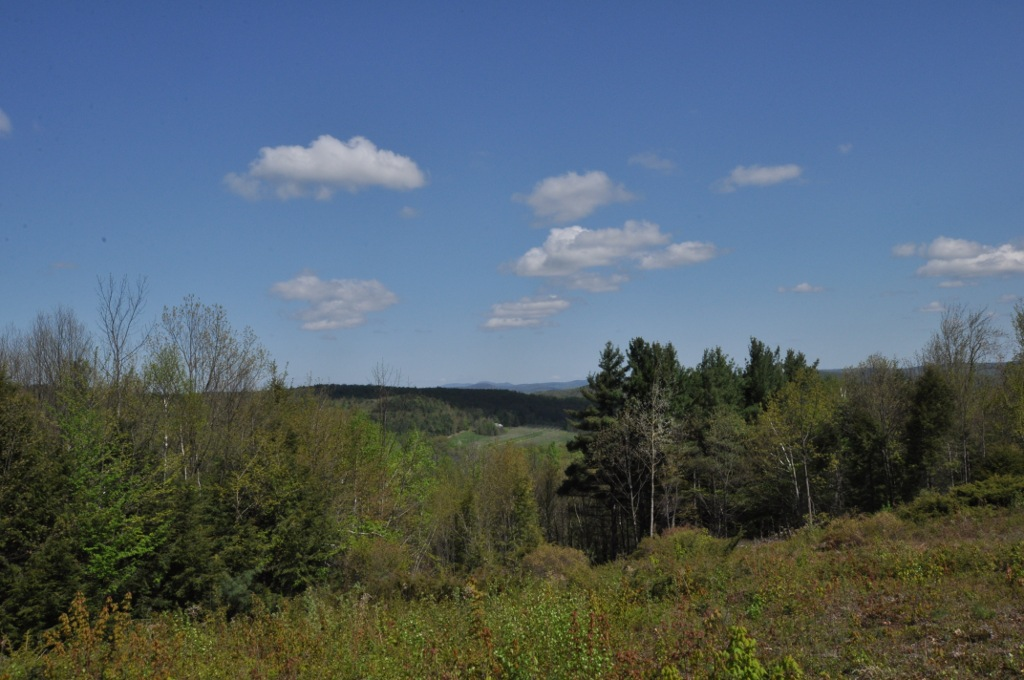
Apple Valley View

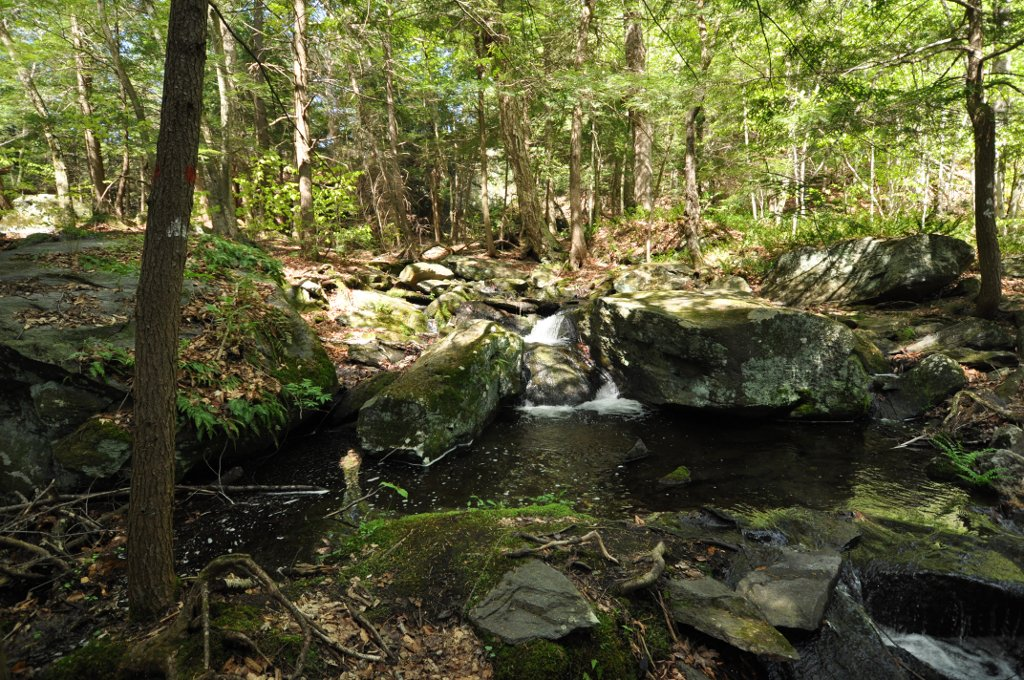
Bear Creek

Bear Swamp is a forested parkland in Ashfield, Massachusetts. The Trustees of Reservations owns and maintains the property.

Although Bear Swamp was once a sheep pasture and later a source of cordwood and lumber, it now seems much like an untouched wilderness. The landscape is irregular, well-drained, and covered with nutrient-rich soils. Protected from the elements, hardwood trees such as ash, hickory, basswood, maple, and cherry grow straight and tall.

Three miles (5 km) of trails lead to different parts of the reservation. The Beaver Brook Trail traces the southern rim of a shallow pond and wet meadow where an old beaver dam rests atop an old stone milldam. Although many trees have died in the flooded zone, the water is receding and the forest is returning. The Fern Glade Trail features a variety of ferns and woodland wildflowers. A scenic vista on the Lookout Trail and the hillside meadow at the Apple Valley Overlook both offer views of nearby apple orchards and the Green Mountains of Vermont beyond. Seasonal hunting is permitted at this property subject to all state and town laws.

== History ==
Concerned that the growing population of Ashfield would spell an end to its wild places, Rev. Philip and Esther Steinmetz began to buy land in the early 1960s with the intention of preserving it forever. They gave this area to the public in 1968. Various other gifts of land by the Steinmertzes and others increased the size of the land, as did additional land purchased in 1997.

== See also ==
- List of old growth forests in Massachusetts
