= Thunderbolt Trail =

Backcountry Ski Racing Trail in Massachusetts

Thunderbolt Ski Trail
- Length: About 1.6 miles (one way, downhill) plus climb (summit is only accessible by climbing in winter. Climbing distance varies by uphill route chosen)
- Location: Mt. Greylock, Massachusetts
- Designation: Historic Ski Racing Trail
- Trailheads: Top: Mt. Greylock Summit Bottom: Trailhead at Thiel Road
- Use: Designed for Skiing and Ski Racing. Also used for Hiking, Snowshoeing

The Thunderbolt Trail is a non-lift-served backcountry ski trail on Mt. Greylock, at 3491 feet, the highest point in Massachusetts. It runs from the summit down the east face of the mountain to the base via a trail that drops more than 2000 feet in 1.6 miles. Designed as a Class A ski racing trail and named after a roller coaster at Revere Beach, MA, the trail is considered one of the classic backcountry runs in North America for its combination of historic importance and its challenging terrain. Vermont Country magazine called the Thunderbolt “perhaps the best-known and most-trafficked backcountry spot in New England.” According to Ski magazine, the challenges included its sidehills, streambed traverses, and a section called the Needle's Eye, where “the forest crowded in so close that turning was impossible.” These obstacles served as an essential testing ground for the country's first generation of Olympic alpine ski racers.

== History ==
The Thunderbolt Ski Run was constructed in three months during the fall of 1934 by the 107th Company of the CCC (Civilian Conservation Corps). In 1935, the first Massachusetts State Downhill Championship was held on it. In order to get to the starting line, skiers first had to climb the mountain, as the trail was not served by a lift and the road to the summit is closed in winter. The race quickly gained international attention, attracting the attention of Olympians from around the world, as well as spectators by the thousands, who arrived via train from New York City. It also attracted international attention from European ski champions, as well as from propagandist politicians in Nazi Germany, who, in 1938, sent a German ski team to the Thunderbolt to prove the superiority of German athletes. Seven thousand spectators lined the Thunderbolt to watch as German skier Fritz Dehmel narrowly beat Rudy Konieczny, the local favorite from Adams, in the Eastern Downhill Championships.

The local trail cultivated a strong ski culture so that 20 men from Adams – more, per capita, than from any other American town—enlisted in the 10th Mountain Division (ski troops) during World War II. All but one returned home. That one was Rudy Konieczny, who was killed in action on April 17, 1945, just three weeks before Germany surrendered. He is remembered as the “Hero of the Thunderbolt.”

After the war, many of the 10th Mountain veterans worked in the new and growing downhill ski industry, but ski areas became lift-served, and the Thunderbolt attracted fewer and fewer skiers. Mt.Greylock hosted its last FIS (International Ski Federation) sanctioned race in 1948, after which the trail became overgrown and ultimately, fell into disuse.

== The Revival of the Thunderbolt Trail ==
In 1999, Blair Mahar, a teacher from nearby Hoosac Valley High School, led a group of students in a historical study of the race. The end product of that project was a documentary film, Purple Mountain Majesty, about the trail, which won first place in the Northeast Video and Film Festival and brought attention to the history in the student's backyard. But the project had an even more lasting impact, as local skiers, inspired by the Thunderbolt's Olympic-level skiing history, began working to clear debris and make the trail operational again. In 2008, the Thunderbolt Ski Runners was formed to organize volunteers, reclaim the trail, and revive Thunderbolt racing.

== The Thunderbolt Ski Race ==
In 2010, the Thunderbolt Ski Runners organized a race to commemorate the trail's 75th anniversary. Other races were held in 2011 and 2014, with the most coveted award being King and Queen of the Mountain, awarded to the man and woman with the fastest combined times for ascent and descent.

In 2014, officially sanctioned races returned to the mountain. The rando-style endurance races, sanctioned by the U.S. Ski Mountaineering Association, include three laps of climbing up the mountain (using skins to ski uphill, and hiking where the terrain is too steep for uphill skiing) and skiing down. There is also a shorter recreational course.

The fastest total time for one lap up and down the mountain is about an hour, of which at least 50 minutes is uphill. And while today's Thunderbolt skiers might take anywhere from 3 minutes to 10 minutes to ski down, the fastest known time down the trail is 2 minutes, 8.6 seconds, set by Norwegian Olympian Per Klippgen in 1948. In 2015, then 93-year old Steven Nowicki (he died in 2016) one of the original Thunderbolt racers, told WBUR that while most of the skiers who set the records were dead, the records lived on.

== Current status and events ==
Today, the Thunderbolt Ski Runners organization continues to maintain the trail, working to combat erosion caused by water runoff and by too many hikers wearing ruts into the trail. Use by hikers in winter is also an issue because hikers sink into the snow, creating large holes that can be hazardous for skiers. The Thunderbolt Ski Runners are working with the Massachusetts Department of Conservation and Recreation to develop ways to better educate users about how to reduce the impact of foot traffic on the trail.

In Adams, ThunderFest celebrates the Thunderbolt Ski Race and winter in the Berkshires. The outdoor festival features local eateries, local craft beers and wines, craft vendors, a chowder cook-off, music, and tours of the Thunderbolt Ski Museum. In the past, the festival was scheduled to follow the race, but more recently, it has been scheduled independently of the race.

Also located in Adams, inside the Adams Visitor's Center, is the Thunderbolt Museum, a small single-purpose museum that tells the story of the trail. Exhibits include films, film clips of interviews, race footage, photographs, documents, maps, race paraphernalia, and an array of historic ski equipment, including examples of the type of seven-foot long wooden skis that were commonly used when the trail was first built.
