= Taconic Mountains =

Appalachian Mountain range in the United States

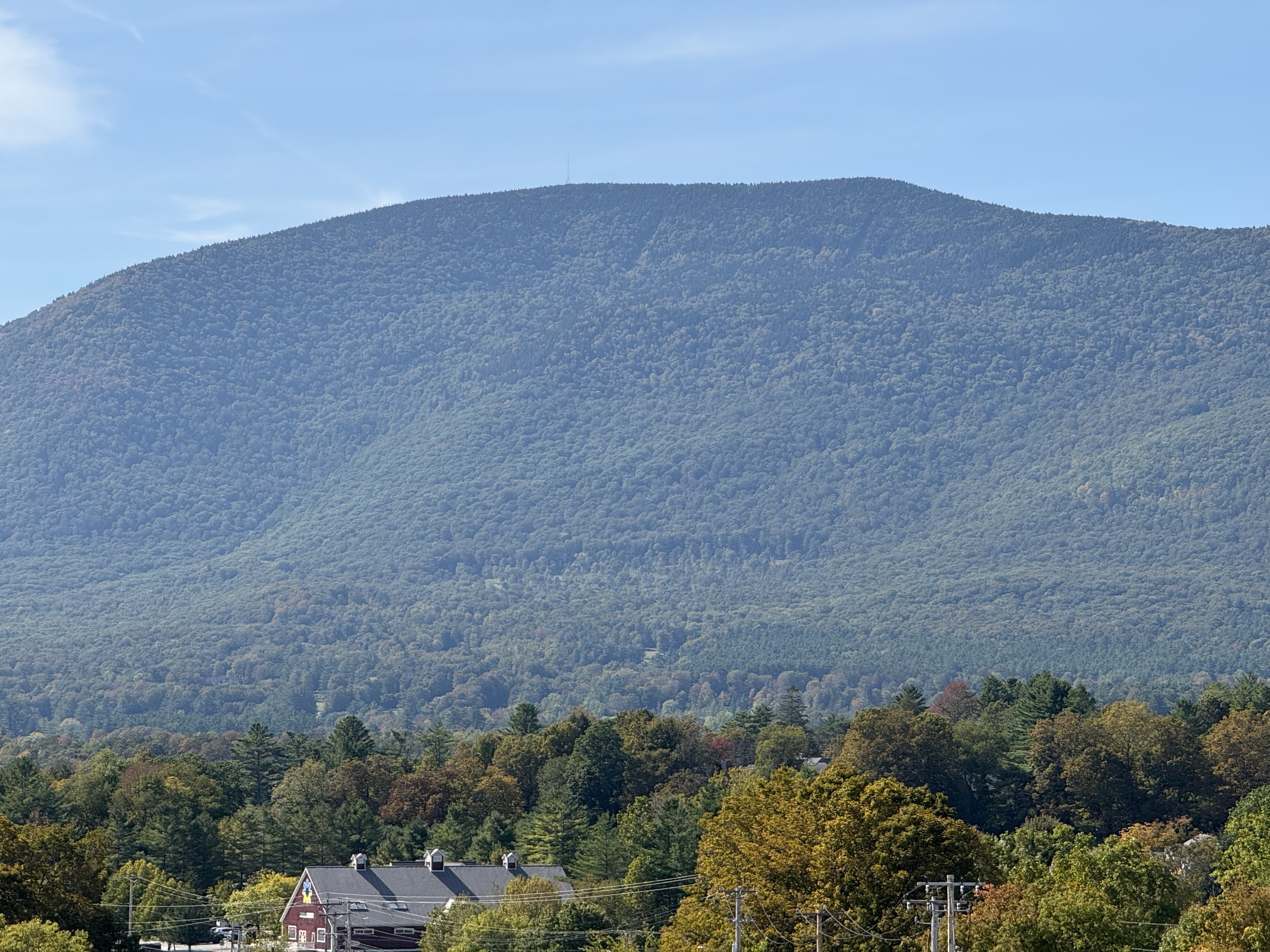
- Mount Equinox (3,840 ft) in Vermont is the high point of the Taconic range

Highest point
- Peak: Equinox Mountain, Bennington County, Vermont
- Elevation: 3,850 ft (1,170 m)

Geography
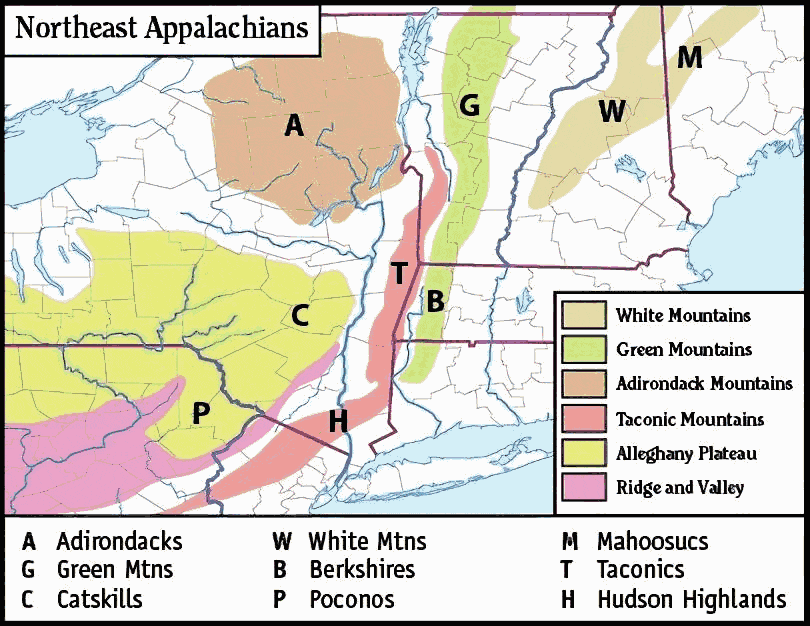
- Orogenies of the northeast United States
- Country: United States
- State(s): New York, Connecticut, Massachusetts, Vermont
- Region(s): western New England, eastern New York
- Range coordinates: 42°41.5′N 73°17.1′W
- Parent range: Appalachian Mountains
- Biome: Northern hardwood forest,

Geology
- Orogeny: Taconic Orogeny
- Rock age: 440 million years
- Rock type: Thrust fault

The Taconic Mountains (/təˈkɒnɪk/) are a 150-mile-long sub-range of the Appalachian Mountains lying on the eastern border of New York State and adjacent New England. The range, which played a role in the history of geological science, is separated from the Berkshires and Green Mountains to the east by a series of valleys, principally those of the Housatonic River, Battenkill River and Otter Creek. The Taconics' highest point is Mount Equinox in Vermont at 3,840 feet (1,170 m); among many other summits are Dorset Mountain, Mount Greylock and Mount Everett.

Forests are predominantly maple-beech-birch with some spruce-fir at higher elevations, "and oak and hickory common to the south and at lower elevations." Parts of the Taconics are in the New England-Acadian forests ecoregion. Although mostly private property, the Taconics contain a half-dozen sizable state forests and parks, as well as many preserves of lesser acreage protected by land trusts. Several hundred miles of trails are within these mountains, including parts of the Appalachian Trail.

== Name ==
Taconic is likely from a Delaware word meaning "in the trees". The spelling "Taghkanic", among several variant transliterations, is current for about a half-dozen locales, mostly within the immediate region. As written English, the term appears in a 1685 petition for the right to purchase land in western Massachusetts. Timothy Dwight IV used the name "Taughkannuc Mountain" in an account of his 1781 ascent of the summit later named Mount Everett. Dwight's was later deemed the "first recorded ascent" of that peak in a 1989 text on regional hiking history.

The term "taconic" first entered geological literature in 1819 with Chester Dewey's "Sketch of the Mineralogy and Geology of the Vicinity of Williams' College". It gained prominence in the field when Dewey's protégé Emmons proposed the existence of a "Taconic System" in 1839 (see §Geology). In the 20th century, it became attached to the theory of an Ordovician mountain-building event involving much of what is now eastern North America named the "Taconic Orogeny".

== Geology ==
The range is part of the Taconic Allochthon, a local rock structure which traveled to its current position from about 25 miles to the east through low-angle thrusting. Rocks of this allochthon are older than the strata lying beneath, and consist of slate, phyllite, and schist, "plus some minor lenses of limestone." The Taconic allochthon is larger than the current Taconic Mountains, extending westward toward the Hudson River. It formed during the Ordovician period in the collision of the North American Plate into a volcanic island arc.

Geologist E-An Zen proved this allochthon's existence in 1966 via a study of the region's faulting, although it had been proposed around 1906 by Rudolf Ruedemann and separately by Arthur Keith, each using concepts associated with French geologist Marcel Alexandre Bertrand. The allochthon's existence, however, was viewed as unproven and controversial until Zen's work.

An earlier and largely separate dispute over the age of the Taconic Mountains based on the region's sparse fossil record began in the 1830s and centered on the theory of Ebenezer Emmons of Williams College that the range was older than its surroundings with a distinct geology he named "the Taconic System." In opposing Emmons' theory, James Hall of Rensselaer Polytechnic Institute initially gained prominent support from famed international scientists of the day, including Louis Agassiz and Charles Lyell.

Emmons died in 1863, yet as late as the 1880s two leading geologists of the era James Dwight Dana (Yale University) and Jules Marcou wrote of their continued and sometimes bitter disagreements over Emmons' theory. This early phase of ideas about the Taconic Mountains is compared with the Great Devonian Controversy that preoccupied British geologists for part of the 19th century.

== Description ==
=== South Taconics ===
This area includes a locally significant and expansive area of undisturbed forest, although only a fraction is assured protection from development. Mount Washington State Forest and Taconic State Park are among the larger public properties within the immediate region. The highest summit here is Mount Everett 2,624 feet (800 m), home of a pitch pine and scrub oak biome. Others include Mount Frissell, the south slope of which contains the highest point in Connecticut at 2,379 feet (725 m); Bear Mountain 2,326 feet (709 m), the highest mountain peak in Connecticut; Alander Mountain 2,239 feet (682 m), Brace Mountain 2,311 feet (704 m); and Mount Fray 1,893 feet (577 m), home of the Catamount Ski Area. The Appalachian Trail traverses the eastern escarpment of the range; the 21.3-mile (34.3 km) South Taconic Trail traverses the western escarpment, passing near Bash Bish Falls, reputedly Massachusetts' highest waterfall.

=== Central Segment and Upper Hoosic River Valley Region ===
From Catamount Ski Area north to the Hoosic River Valley, a straight-line distance of about 50 miles, the crest initially shifts slightly west. Notable summits in the southern part of this segment are Bald Mountain, 1,768 feet (539 m), and Harvey Mountain, 2,057 feet (627 m), as well as Beebe Hill, 1,726 feet (526 m), with its summit fire tower.

Several miles to the northeast of Harvey Mountain is West Stockbridge Mountain and the Lenox Mountain massif; local conservationists in 1971 named these two landforms Yokun Ridge to emphasize their perceived continuity. Yokun Ridge is about 9-mile (14 km) and extends from the Massachusetts Turnpike to the southerly neighborhoods of Pittsfield at elevations ranging between roughly 1,000 and 2,000 feet (300 and 610 m).

At Pittsfield, the crest shifts west once again to hills contained within Pittsfield State Forest and the contiguous Balance Rock Park and Bates Memorial State Park, where heights include Holy Mount 1,968 feet (600 m), (once the location of religious rituals practiced by a former Shaker community) and Berry Hill 2,200 feet (670 m), notable for its extensive stands of wild azalea.

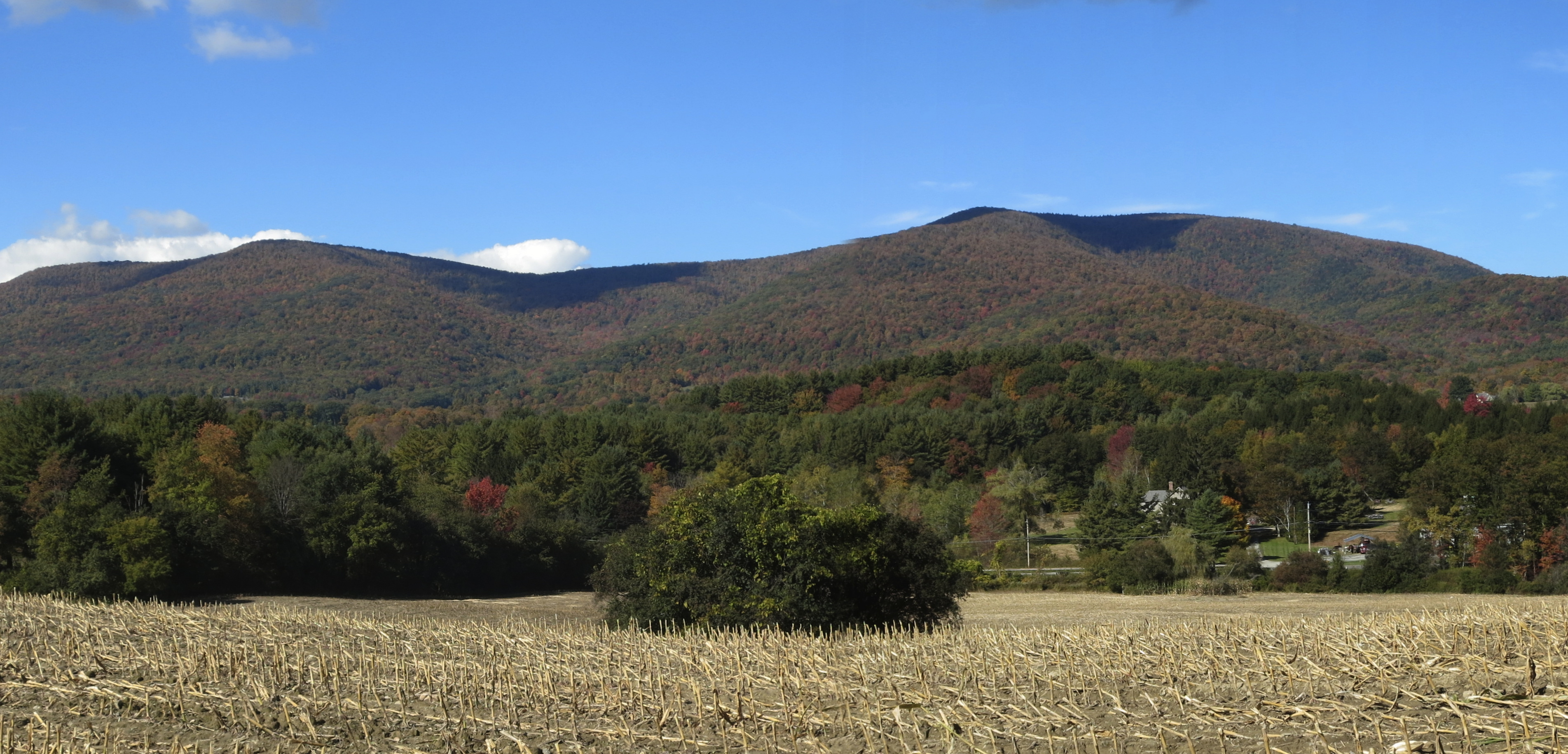
Misery Mountain (left) and Berlin Mountain (right) seen from the east in South Williamstown, MA

North of Jiminy Peak 2,392 feet (729 m), the valley of Kinderhook Creek cuts through the hills. Here the westernmost ridgeline is dominated by Misery Mountain and Berlin Mountain 2,818 feet (859 m) and extending into Pownal, Vermont. In this vicinity is Mount Greylock 3,491 feet (1,064 m), the highest point in Massachusetts and the long ridge of 2,621 feet (799 m) Brodie Mountain.

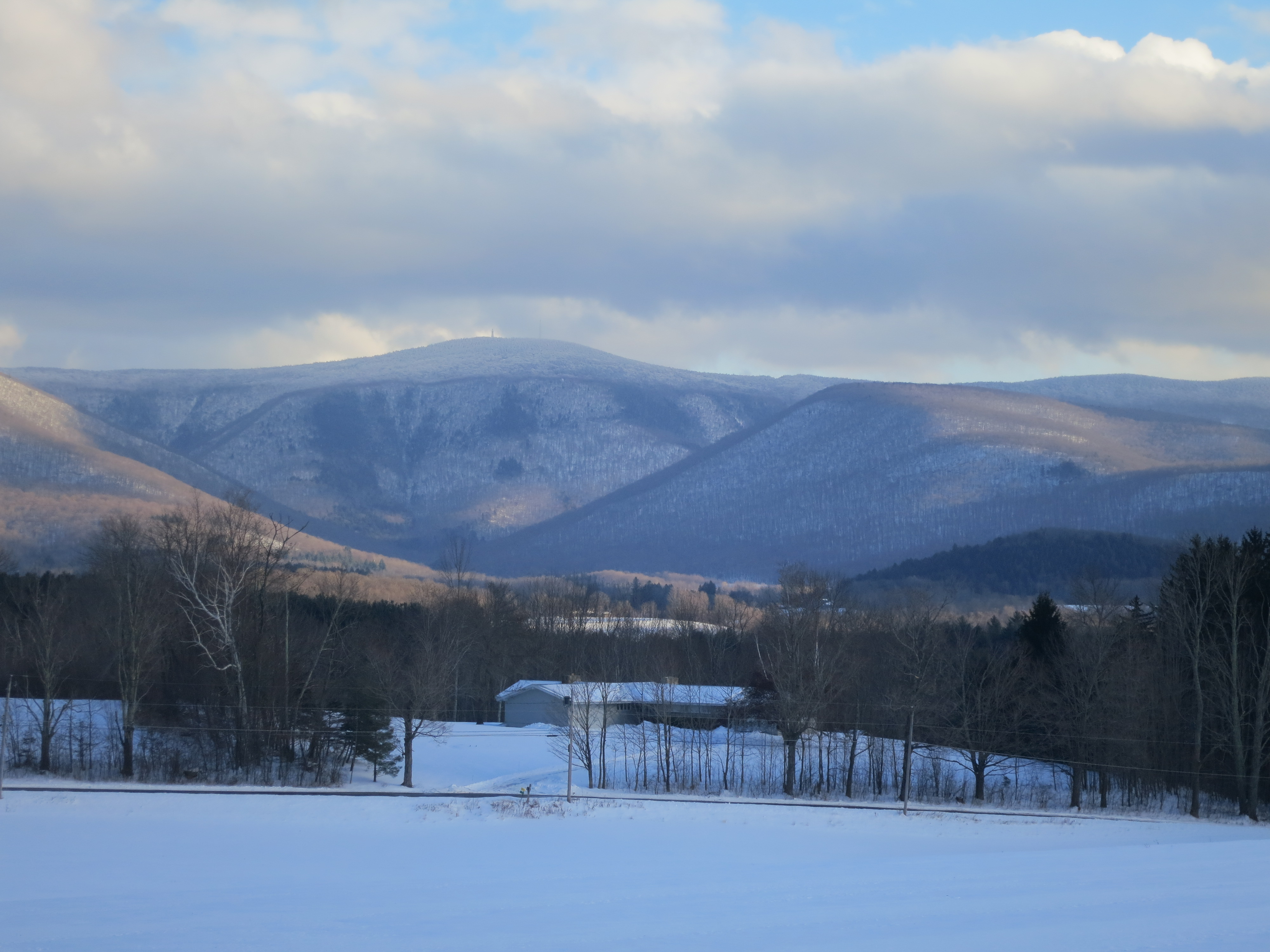
Mount Greylock with its glacial cirque, the Hopper, is geologically part of the Taconic Mountain Range.

Significant public property within the Taconics' central segment includes New York's Beebe Hill and Harvey Mt. State Forest, Berlin State Forest, Pittsfield State Forest and the contiguous Taconic Ridge State Forest and Taconic Trail State Park in New York and Massachusetts, respectively, as well as the Mount Greylock State Reservation.

Within this segment are also three long-distance trails (the Appalachian Trail, the Taconic Crest Trail, and the Taconic Skyline Trail)s.

=== Southern Vermont ===
North of the Massachusetts border, the profile of the Taconic Range is cut by the Hoosic River in the vicinity of Bennington, Vermont. Mount Anthony 2,320 feet (710 m), notable for its caves and as the location of the former Southern Vermont College, stands as a satellite peak above the surrounding eroded terrain. North of Bennington, the range gradually rises to its highest prominence with peaks such as Mount Equinox 3,850 feet (1,170 m), the high point of the Taconic Mountains, and Dorset Mountain 3,770 feet (1,150 m), a New England 100 Highest list summit. Other notable summits include Grass Mountain 3,109 feet (948 m), a New England Fifty Finest list mountain, and Mount Aeolus 3,230 feet (980 m), the location of several defunct marble quarries and the site of Aeolus Cave (an important bat hibernaculum). Designated hiking trails are located on Mount Equinox, Dorset Mountain, and Mount Aeolus, and several other peaks within the region.

=== Northern terminus ===
Immediately north of Danby, Vermont, the Taconic Range broadens and becomes lower. It exhibits several parallel ridgelines, dominated to the west by mountains composed of slate and similar rock, most notably the ridgeline of Saint Catherine Mountain 1,200 feet (370 m), with its conspicuous 5-mile (8.0 km) long cliff face visible from Wells and Poultney. The area around Lake Saint Catherine contains extensive slate quarries. The ridgeline to the east, composed of schist and phyllite, is dominated by the 7-mile (11 km) escarpment of Tinmouth Mountain 2,835 feet (864 m), overlooking the Valley of Vermont to the east in the town of Tinmouth. A field of less descript ridges and peaks lies between these two summits.

Near the end of the range, in the vicinity of Rutland, Vermont, the Taconic Mountains show several prominent peaks with dramatic, irregular cliff faces clearly visible from U.S. Route 4 west of the city of Rutland; these include Herrick Mountain 2,726 feet (831 m); Grandpa's Knob 1,976 feet (602 m), the former site of the Smith–Putnam wind turbine, the first large-scale electricity-producing wind turbine; and the butte-like Bird Mountain (also called Birdseye Mountain) 2,216 feet (675 m), home of the Bird Mountain Wildlife Management Area and notable as an important raptor migration path and nesting site. Also part of the Taconic Mountains are the foothills of the Lake Bomoseen region west of Birdseye and Grandpa's Knob, notable for their extensive slate quarrying operations. North of Grandpa's Knob, the Taconic Range soon diminishes into scattered hills which extend north into the Burlington, Vermont region. Isolated summits in this area include Snake Mountain 1,281 feet (390 m), a Nature Conservancy preserve featuring a variety of rare and endangered species; and Mount Philo 968 feet (295 m), home of Mount Philo State Park with its mountaintop campground.

== History ==
Historically the land was inhabited by the indigenous Mohicans, who hunted fished, and farmed the land. After an exodus to Stockbridge in 1736, their presence was diminished and all the tribe had all but vanished from the Taconics by the 19th century.

Natural resource extraction has been an important industry in the Taconic Mountains; extraction industries have included marble, limestone, slate, and iron mining as well as logging and charcoaling. The Dorset VT marble quarry which began operations in 1785, is considered the oldest in the US.

== Conservation ==
Along with various state properties, some mentioned elsewhere in this article, the Berkshire Natural Resources Council and the Nature Conservancy have been active in the region. The U.S. Forest Service has designated several areas within the Taconics under its Forest Legacy Program, which affords subsidies for the acquisition of conservation easement, although practical effects have been limited. Minor fragments of the Green Mountain National Forest are located in the Northern Taconics. Multi-partner collaboratives that have targeted the Taconic Mountains with limited results and include the New England Wildlands and Woodlands Collaborative, a regional conservation agenda for the New England states produced by representatives of dozens of non-profits and academic institutions and, more specifically, the Taconic Crest Project (apparently inactive, 2026) which involved the states of New York, Massachusetts, and Vermont in collaboration with local land trusts and The Nature Conservancy.

== See also ==
- Berkshires
- List of subranges of the Appalachian Mountains
- Mount Greylock
- Yokun Ridge
