= Beartown State Forest =

Protected area in Massachusetts, United States

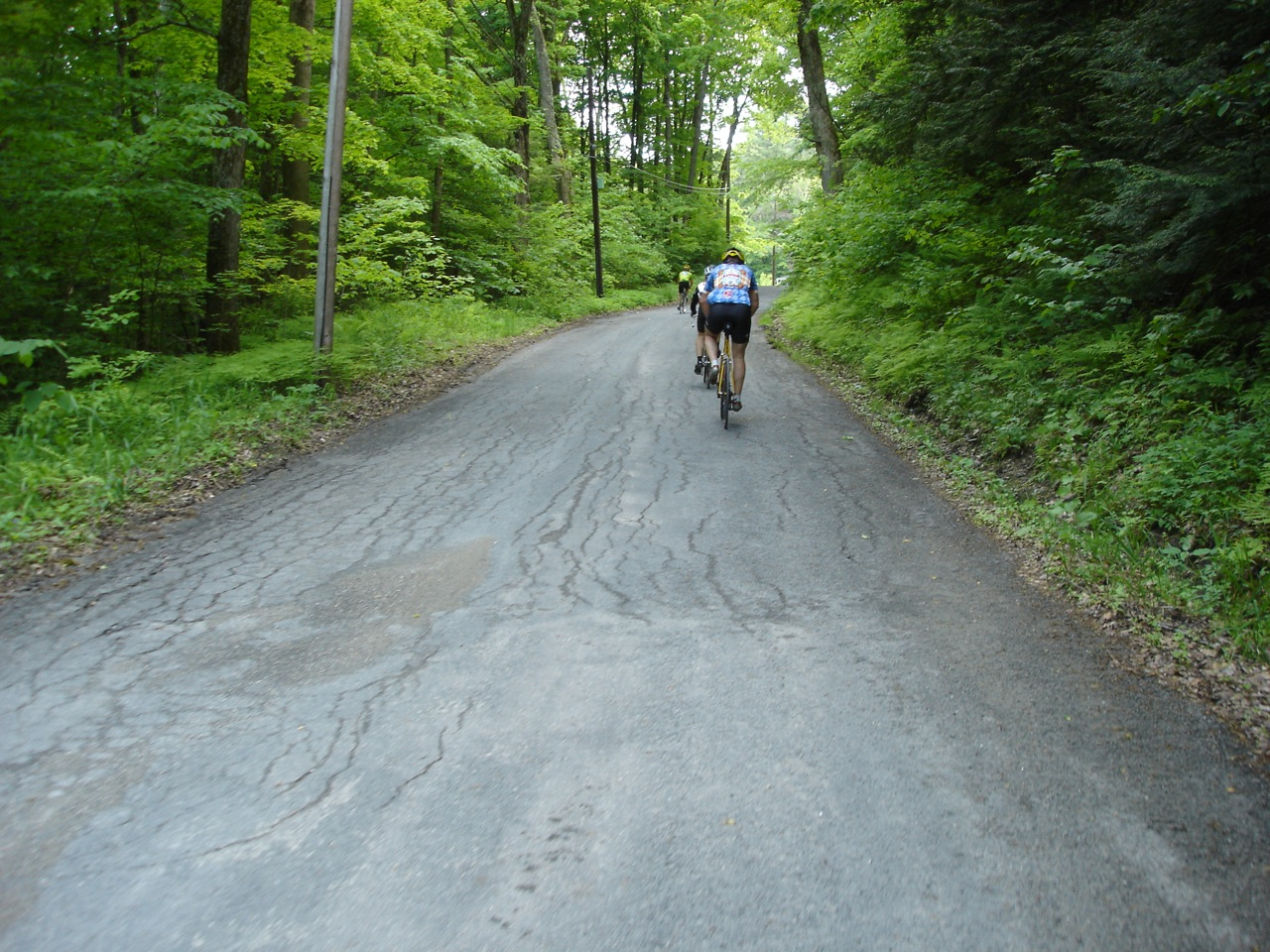
- Biker in Beartown State Forest, June 2008

- Location within Massachusetts Location within the United States
- Location: Monterey, Massachusetts, United States
- Coordinates: 42°13′00″N 73°17′32″W
- Area: 10,411 acres (4,213 ha)
- Elevation: 1,965 ft (599 m)
- Established: 1921
- Administrator: Massachusetts Department of Conservation and Recreation
- Website: Official website

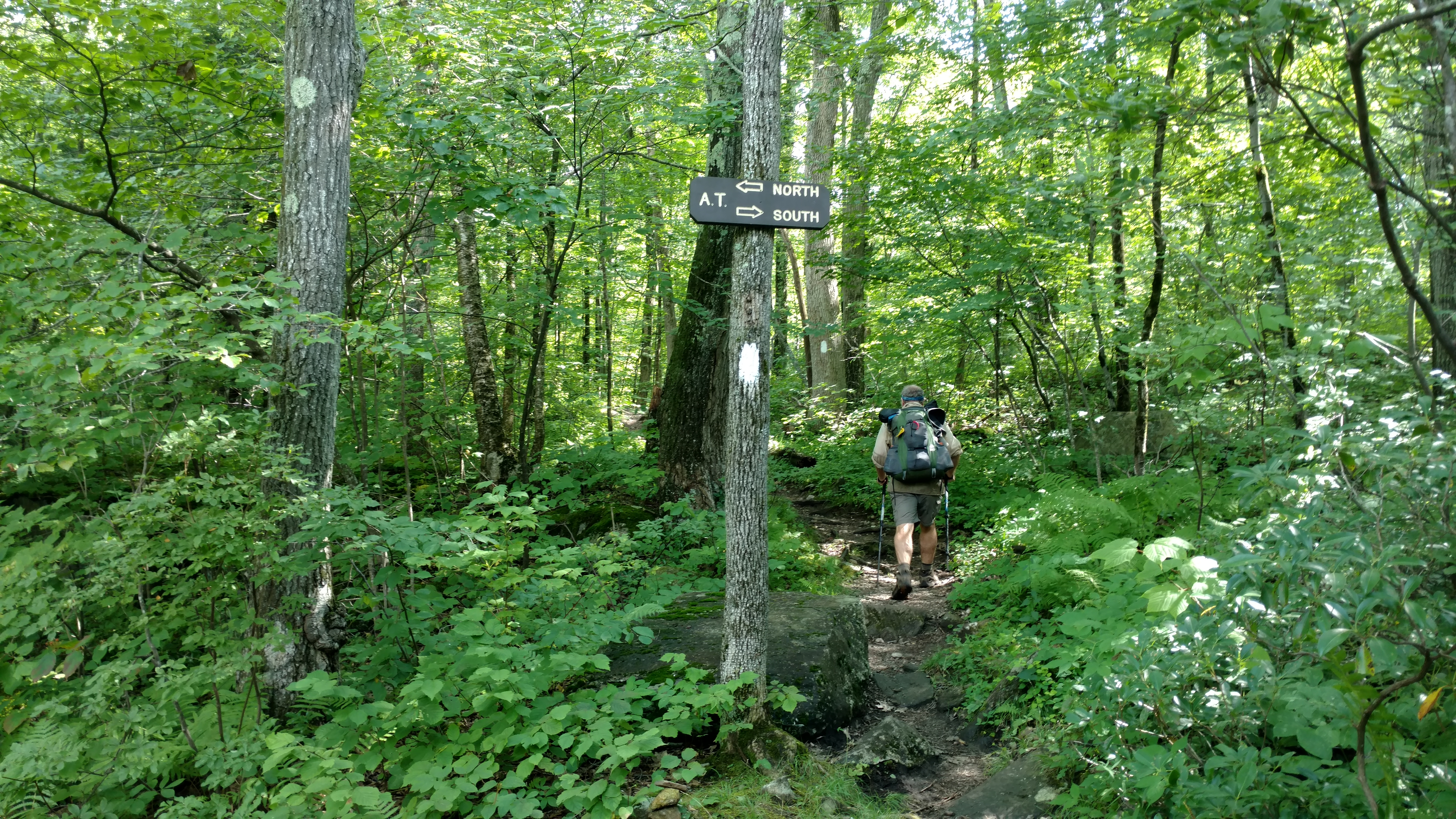
Hiker on the Appalachian Trail

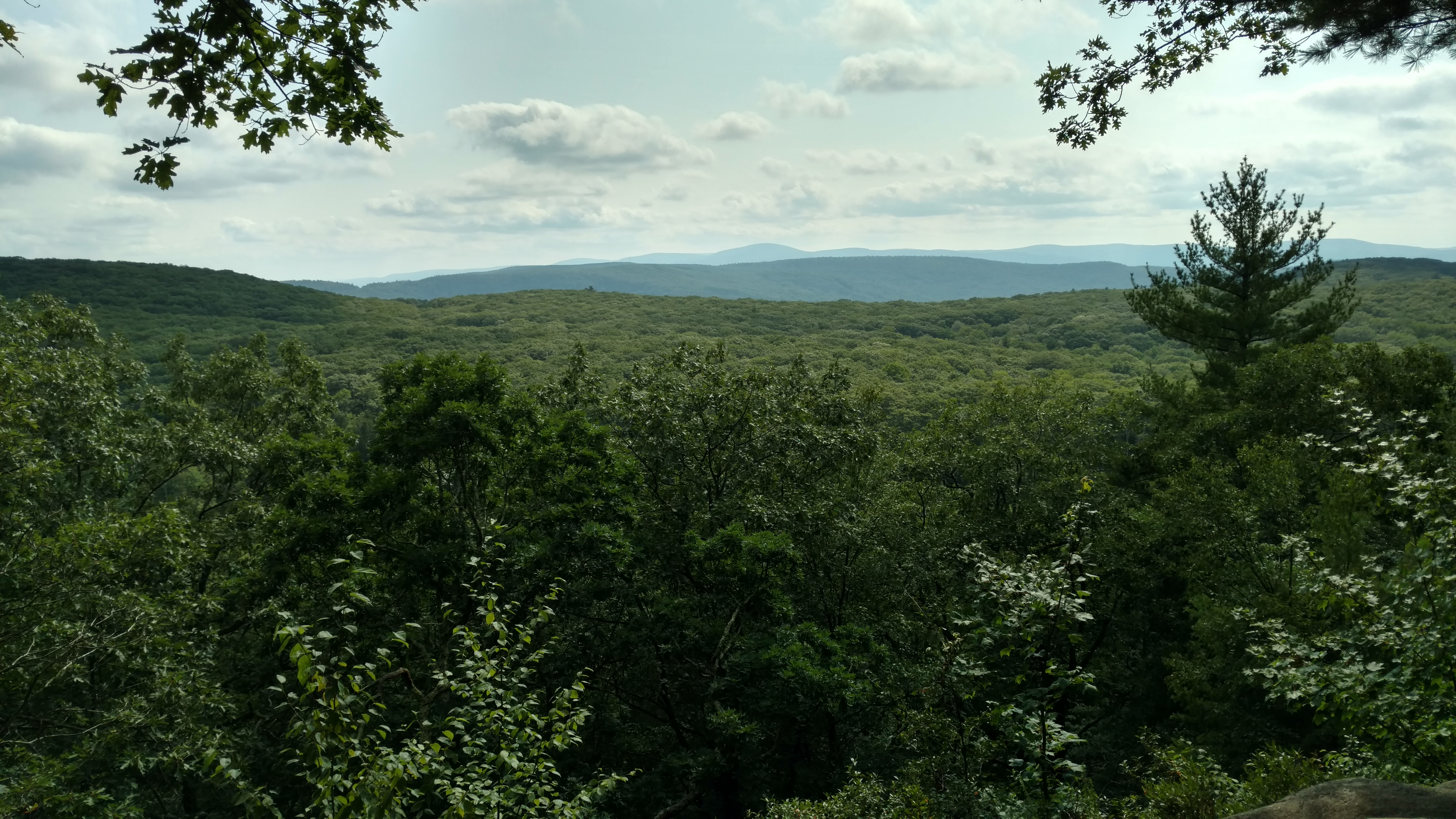
View from The Ledges

Beartown State Forest is a publicly owned forest with recreational features located in the towns of Great Barrington, Monterey, Lee, and Tyringham, Massachusetts. The state forest's more than 10,000 acres (4,000 ha) include 198 acres (80 ha) of recreational parkland. It is managed by the Massachusetts Department of Conservation and Recreation.

== History ==
The forest was established with the state's purchase of 5000 acres in 1921. Forest roads were created by workers with the Civilian Conservation Corps beginning in 1933. Major CCC projects included the building of an earthen dam to create 35-acre (14 ha) Benedict Pond. The CCC camps were active here until 1940.

== Flora and fauna ==
Wildlife include deer, bobcats, fishers, black bear, and beaver. Flora includes deciduous forests, various flowering shrubs and wildflowers. Two areas of old growth forest exist in the park. At Burgoyne Pass (42°16′3″N 73°17′8″W), there are 10 acres (4.0 ha) of old-growth eastern hemlock, northern red oak, eastern white pine, sweet birch, and yellow birch. At East Brook, there are 12 acres (4.9 ha) of old-growth eastern hemlock and yellow birch.

== Activities and amenities ==
The forest has trails for horseback riding, mountain biking, snowmobiling, snowshoeing, and all-terrain vehicle use. A 1.7-mile (2.7 km) interpretive trail loops around Benedict Pond and a 7.5-mile (12.1 km) stretch of the Appalachian Trail passes near the pond and across the forest. Swimming, fishing, and a ramp for non-motorized boating are offered on Benedict Pond. There are also facilities for camping, picnicking and restricted hunting as well as handicapped-accessible beaches and restrooms.

== See also ==
- List of old growth forests in Massachusetts
