= Mount Everett =

Mountain in Massachusetts, United States

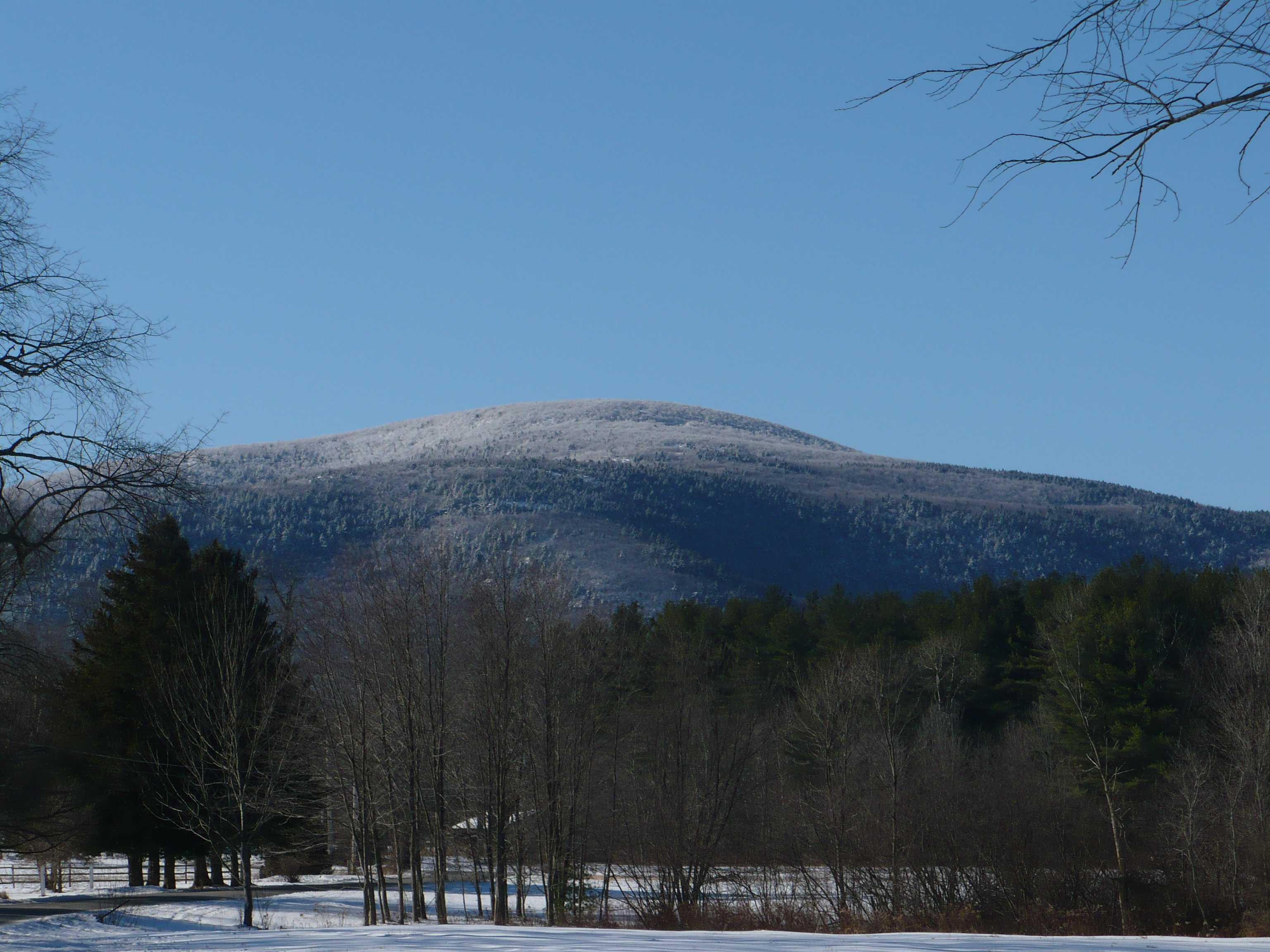
- View from Bears Den Road, Sheffield, MA

Highest point
- Elevation: 2,602 ft (793 m)
- Prominence: 1,663 ft (507 m)
- Parent peak: 42° 06' 07"N, 73° 25' 57"W
- Coordinates: 42°06′07″N 73°25′57″W

Geography
- Location: Southwest Berkshire County, Massachusetts
- Parent range: Taconic Mountains

Geology
- Rock age: Ordovician
- Mountain type(s): Thrust fault; metamorphic rock

Climbing
- Easiest route: Mount Everett Road and Appalachian Trail

Mount Everett is the highest summit of the southern Taconic Mountains, rising about 2,000 feet above its eastern footings in Sheffield, Massachusetts. Its upper dome is noted for wide views and the presence of stunted pitch pine and oak. The Appalachian Trail traverses Mount Everett, which prior to the 20th century was called "Dome of the Taconics." Measured at 2,602 feet (793 meters) above sea level, Everett dominates much local scenery of the upper Housatonic Valley.

== Geography ==
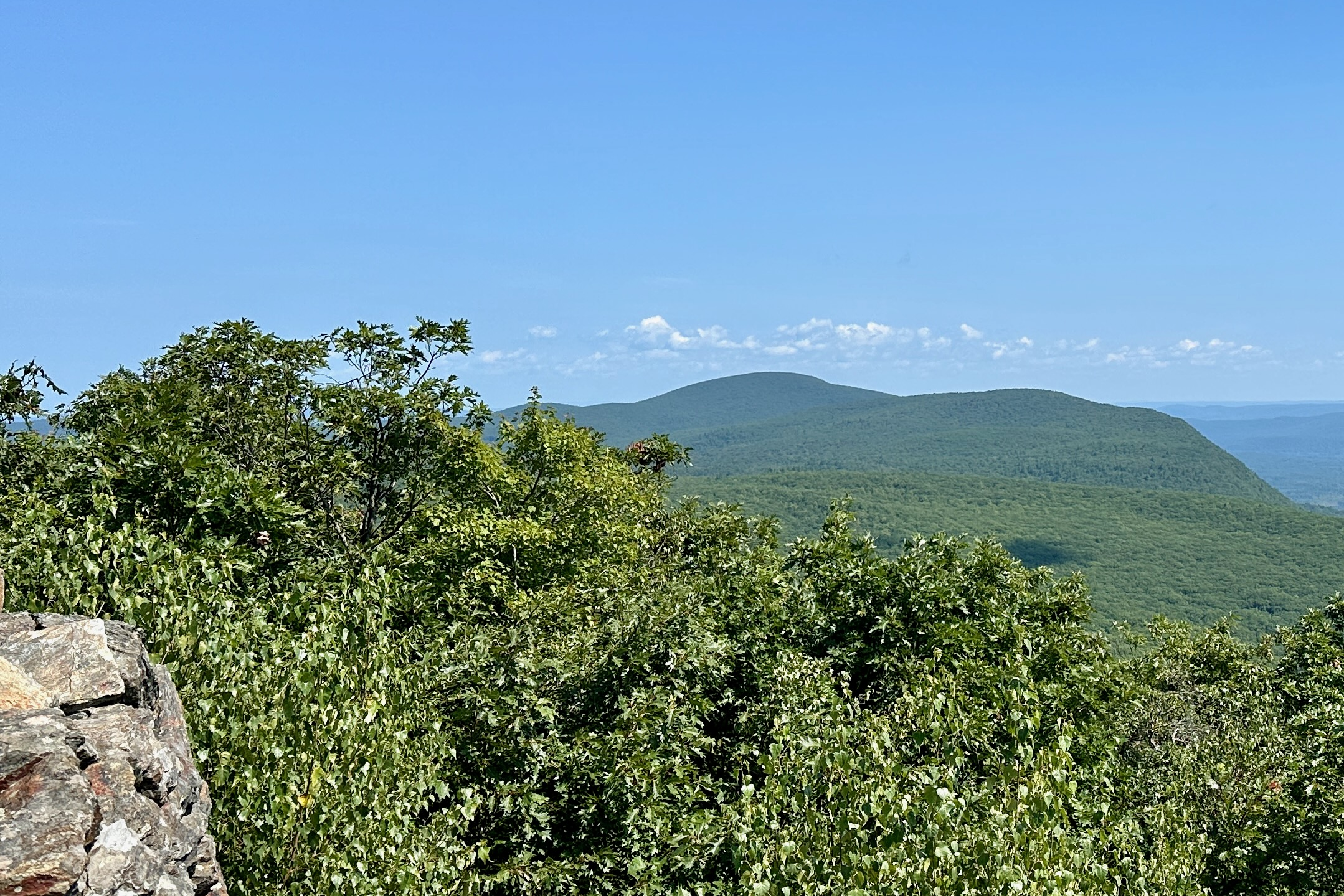
View of Mount Everett and Mount Race from Bear Mountain

Mount Everett helps divide the watersheds of the Hudson and Housatonic rivers. Its eastern slopes share a larger escarpment with Mount Race and Bear Mountain plus several related summits. This escarpment rises from an elevation around 210 metres (700 feet) in Sheffield's Housatonic Valley at a mean angle of about 20 degrees, although its higher reaches are markedly steeper. Everett's more gentle, western slopes begin in a valley occupied by the township of Mount Washington, where the valley floor elevations average about 520 metres (1,700 feet).

A seasonal auto road approaching from the west climbs past Guilder Pond and continues nearly to Everett's summit, but its upper reaches have been long closed to automobiles. The summit area features an open forest of stunted pitch pine and scrub oak. A 40-foot fire tower was on the summit from 1970 until 2003 named "Mt. Washington Fire Tower" after the local township. Earlier towers stood there beginning in 1915. About halfway down the eastern slopes are Race Brook Falls with a source near the gap between Mount Everett and Mount Race.

Much of the mountain is land administered by Mount Washington State Forest and the contiguous Mount Everett State Reservation, which had about 10,000 visitors annually as of a 2005 state estimate. Significant other portions of Everett's slopes are privately held.

== Geology ==
Mount Everett is part of the much larger Taconic Allochthon, a rock structure that migrated about 40 kilometres (25 miles) from the east to its present location, where it arrived via low-angle thrust faulting. More narrowly, rocks of the upper mountain are within the "Everett Formation," a term first used by geologist E-An Zen in mapping and studying the allochthon during the 1960s. Zen modified the term "Everett Schist" (coined in 1893 by William Herbert Hobbs) "in order to include rocks of different metamorphic grades." The formation extends intermittently throughout the highlands of the southern Taconics, with metamorphic grades increasing to the west. Everett Formation rocks are principally olive-gray to green, blue-quartz pebble metagraywacke and quartzite of Ordovician and older age. Everett's lower slopes are part of the Stockbridge Formation, which is generally limestone.

Following extensive fieldwork, Zen and his colleague J.H. Hartshorn produced a geologic map of the local Quadrangle in 1966. Prior to this, studies of the immediate area began in the 1840s with Edward Hitchcock and included extensive work in 1870s by James Dana as well as by Hobbs in 1890s.

== Historical nomenclature ==
=== "Taconic Mountain" and Hitchcock's proposal ===
In 1777 the peak was labeled "Tacan Mountain" on a map by Claude J. Sauthier Separately, the once-famed Yale College President Timothy Dwight IV wrote of his 1781 ascent of "Taughanuk Mountain" in a travel memoir (posthumously published, 1823). Henry David Thoreau visited mountain's western slopes briefly in 1844 and referred to it as "Bald Mountain."

Despite this history, the name "Mount Everett" was proposed in 1841 by Edward Hitchcock in his role as chief of the state Geological Survey, after Edward Everett, governor of Massachusetts (1836-1840). Hitchcock didn't reference "Taconic Mountain" or any variant in his proposal; he wrote merely that the mountain was "often confounded" with the local town of Mount Washington, Mass., where Hitchcock said it was known as Bald Mountain or Ball Mountain, "but in neighboring towns, I believe this name is rarely given." Hitchcock later became president of Amherst College; Everett president of Harvard University.

=== "Dome of the Taconics" ===
By the late 19th century, "there [had] long been a protest against adopting the name that Prof. Hitchcock gave to the summit," according to Clark W. Bryan's 1886 tourist guide titled Book of the Berkshires. Bryan, with offices in Great Barrington, asserted that "the united public sentiment of the region" favored "Dome of the Taconics."

Yet in 1897, the United States Board on Geographic Names which determines federal usage, accepted "Mount Everett," citing published sources. It listed a half-dozen alternate names as of 1897: Bald Dome, Bald Peak, Dome Peak, Mount Washington, Takonnack Mountain and Taughanuk Mountain.

Bryan, a prolific poet, daily newspaper publisher and founder of Good Housekeeping magazine, died by suicide in 1899. Books concerning the region published subsequently in 1899, 1907 and 1939 continued to reference "Dome of the Taconics," but also preferred the official term "Mount Everett."

A 1987 USGS map (republished until 1997) labeled the entire mountain "Mount Everett" and its immediate summit area "Bald Peak." Earlier and later USGS maps for the area don't reference "Bald Peak" on Mount Everett. A wholly separate "Bald Peak" at 588 meters' elevation is also labeled on USGS maps a few miles to the southwest of Everett.

== Thoreau visit ==
Henry David Thoreau visited Guilder Pond and "likely" the top of Everett in 1844, according to regional historian Bernard A. Drew. During their several-day stay in the region around Bash Bish Falls, Thoreau was with his companion William Ellery Channing II (1817-1901). Both Thoreau and Channing had read florid descriptions of the falls in Edward Hitchcock's geological survey of Massachusetts (1841). Channing confirmed this itinerary in an annotation of his copy of A Week on the Concord and Merrimack Rivers, "Thoreau also mentioned passing a 'silent gray tarn … high up the side of a mountain, Bald Mountain' — Guilder Pond, no doubt," Drew has offered.

== External links and further reading ==
- "History and Dynamics of a Ridgetop Pitch Pine Community, Mount Everett, Massachusetts." Harvard Forest Paper No. 25
- "The Taconic Controversy: What Forces Make a Range?" Appalachia: Vol. 73: No. 1 Article 5; available at Dartmouth EDU digital commons:
- "Massachusetts Forest Reserve Long Term Monitoring Mount Washington Forest Reserve" 2009
- "On the Geological Structure of the Mount Washington Mass of the Taconic Range" Hobbs, Wm, 1893
- A credible but uncertain claim that Henry David Thoreau visited Mount Everett
- "Book of the Berkshires" 1886, by Clark W. Bryan (see segment Dome of the Taconics page 147-150)
- Interactive map showing conserved properties (user must adjust scale and turn on the correct "layers" for public and private lands)
- "Mount Washington State Forest Trail Map" (includes Everett Reservation)
