= Mount Greylock =

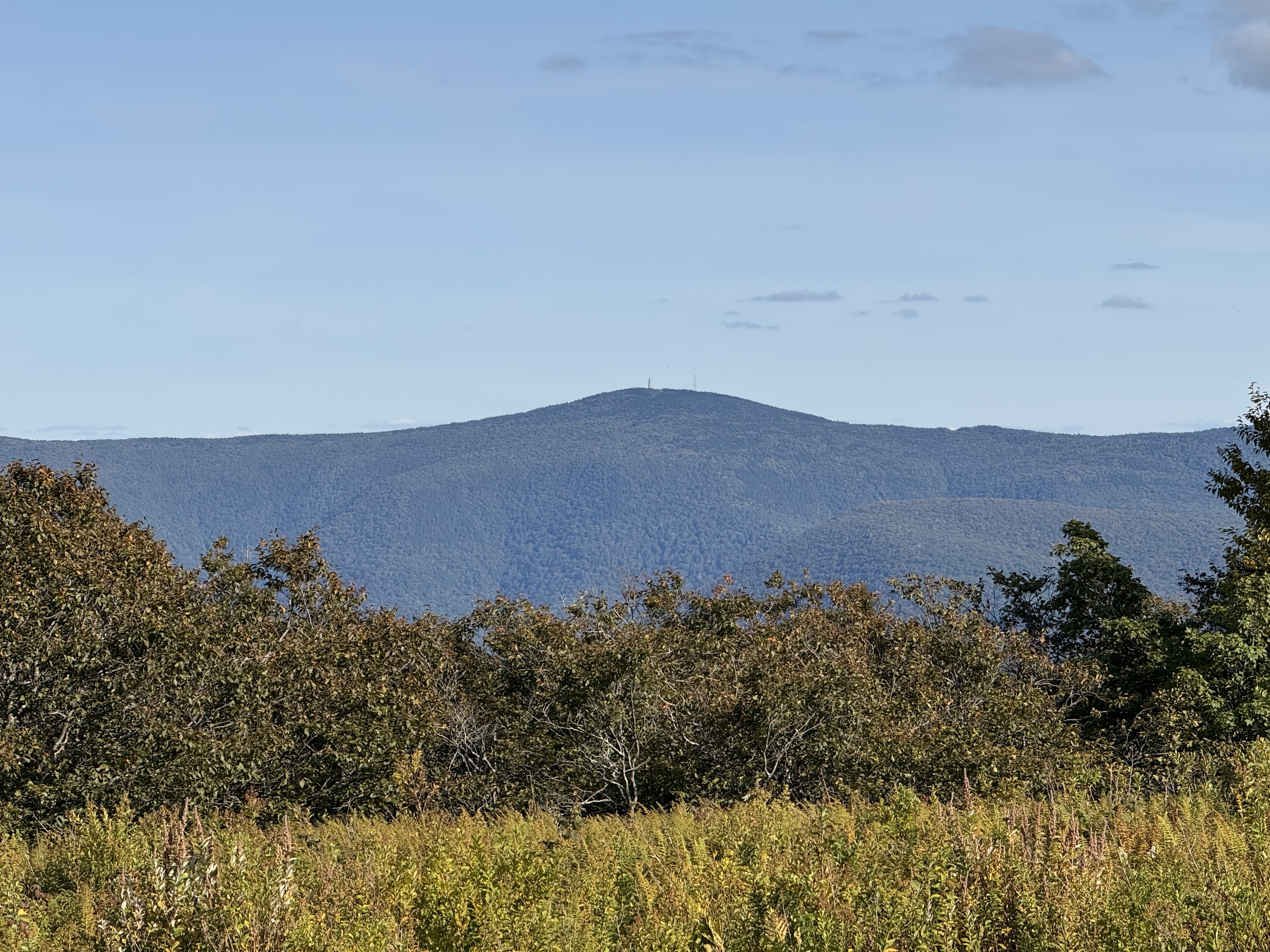
- Mt. Greylock seen from Berlin Mountain

Highest point
- Elevation: 3,489 ft (1,063 m) NAVD 88
- Prominence: 2,463 ft (751 m)
- Listing: U.S. state high point 31st New England Fifty Finest 17th
- Coordinates: 42°38′14″N 73°09′58″W

Geography
- Location within Massachusetts
- Location: Berkshire County, Massachusetts, United States
- Parent range: Taconic Mountains

Geology
- Rock age(s): Ordovician, Taconic orogeny
- Mountain type: thrust fault

Climbing
- Easiest route: Cheshire Harbor Trail

- Mount Greylock Summit Historic District
- U.S. National Register of Historic Places
- U.S. Historic district
- Location: Jct. of Notch, Rockwell, and Summit Rds., Adams, Massachusetts
- Area: 1,200 acres (490 ha)
- Built: 1830
- Architect: Maginnis and Walsh; Vance, Joseph MacArthur, et al.
- Architectural style: Bungalow/Craftsman, Classical Revival
- NRHP reference No.: 98000349
- Added to NRHP: April 20, 1998

Mount Greylock is the highest point in Massachusetts at 3,489 feet (1,063 meters). Located in the northwest region of the state, it is part of the Taconic Mountains, a geologically distinct range from the nearby Berkshires and Green Mountains. Expansive views and a small area of sub-alpine forest characterize its upper reaches. A seasonal automobile road crosses the summit area near three structures from the 1930s; these together constitute a small National Historic District. Various hiking paths including the Appalachian Trail traverse the area, which is part of the larger Mount Greylock State Reservation.

The peak is mentioned in works by Nathaniel Hawthorne, Herman Melville, and Henry David Thoreau.

== Geography ==
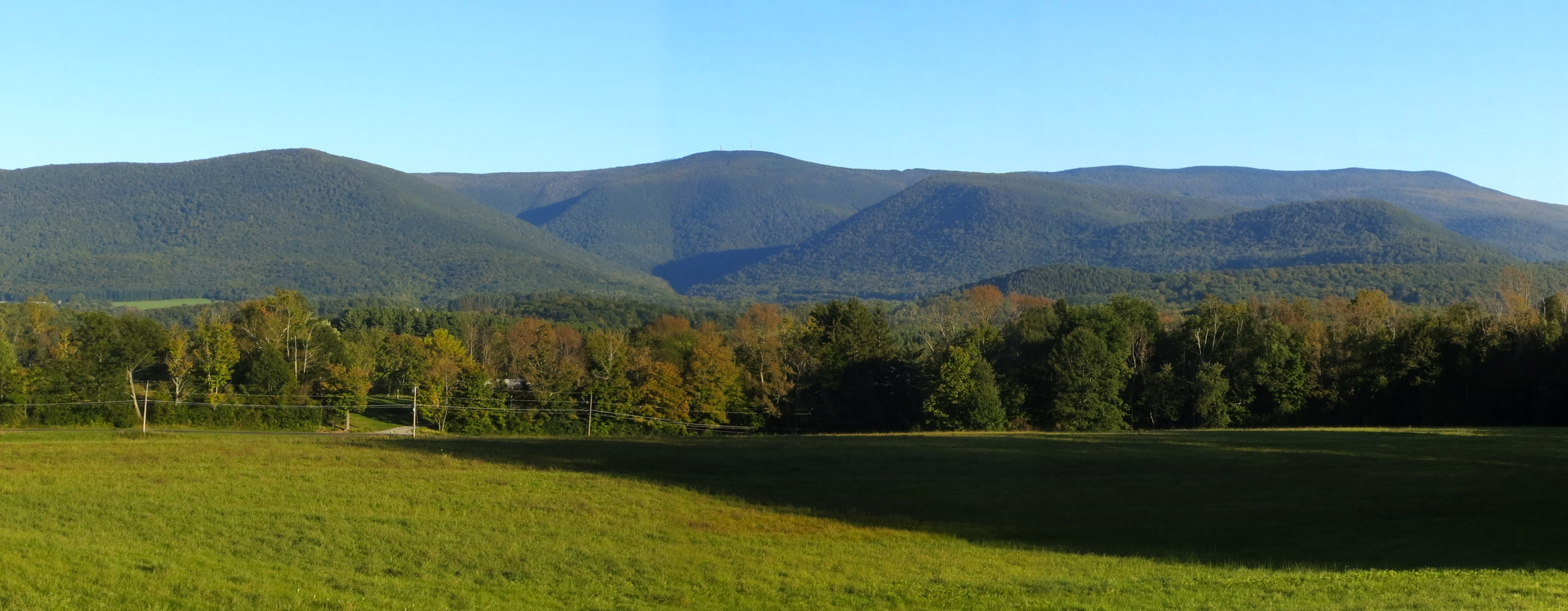
A view of the Mount Greylock Range from South Williamstown (from the west). The Hopper, a two-pronged hollow, is centered below the summit.

Mount Greylock is part of an 11-mile-long (18 km) massif called the "Greylock Range" near the Hoosic River, which hooks around the mountain on its eastern and northern footings. Various summits include Saddle Ball Mountain, along with Mount Fitch and others.

Standing about 2,000 feet (610 meters) above the local Hoosic Valley, Mount Greylock's summit is in Adams, Massachusetts. Other parts of the range extend into five neighboring towns. Sight lines of up to 72 miles (116 km) are possible from Greylock.

The Greylock massif is part of the Taconic Mountains, a geologically distinct range from the nearby Berkshires and Green Mountains separated here by the Hoosic Valley.

The massif is mostly within the Hudson River watershed via the Hoosic River, although a small part near Lanesborough is within the Housatonic River watershed.

The eastern slopes of Greylock are noted for the Thunderbolt ski trail (see below), landslide scars above the city of Adams and "Greylock Glen," a state-sponsored development plan. The western slopes include "The Hopper," a twin-pronged valley caused by erosion. The mountain's north and southern reaches are noted for the presence of an auto road as well as hiking trails.

=== Climate ===
Climate data for Mount Greylock 42.6355 N, 73.1653 W, Elevation: 3,127 ft (953 m) (1991–2020 normals)
Month	Jan	Feb	Mar	Apr	May	Jun	Jul	Aug	Sep	Oct	Nov	Dec	Year
Mean daily maximum °F (°C)	26.2 (−3.2)	28.4 (−2.0)	35.6 (2.0)	48.3 (9.1)	59.9 (15.5)	68.0 (20.0)	72.4 (22.4)	71.0 (21.7)	65.2 (18.4)	53.2 (11.8)	40.8 (4.9)	31.3 (−0.4)	50.0 (10.0)
Daily mean °F (°C)	17.9 (−7.8)	19.3 (−7.1)	26.5 (−3.1)	38.2 (3.4)	49.5 (9.7)	58.1 (14.5)	62.3 (16.8)	61.0 (16.1)	55.2 (12.9)	44.1 (6.7)	32.9 (0.5)	23.8 (−4.6)	40.7 (4.8)
Mean daily minimum °F (°C)	9.5 (−12.5)	10.3 (−12.1)	17.4 (−8.1)	28.0 (−2.2)	39.1 (3.9)	48.1 (8.9)	52.3 (11.3)	50.9 (10.5)	45.2 (7.3)	34.9 (1.6)	24.9 (−3.9)	16.4 (−8.7)	31.4 (−0.3)
Average precipitation inches (mm)	4.22 (107)	3.67 (93)	4.30 (109)	4.86 (123)	5.10 (130)	5.76 (146)	5.56 (141)	5.39 (137)	6.10 (155)	5.71 (145)	4.58 (116)	5.23 (133)	60.48 (1,535)
Source: PRISM Climate Group

== Forests and birds ==
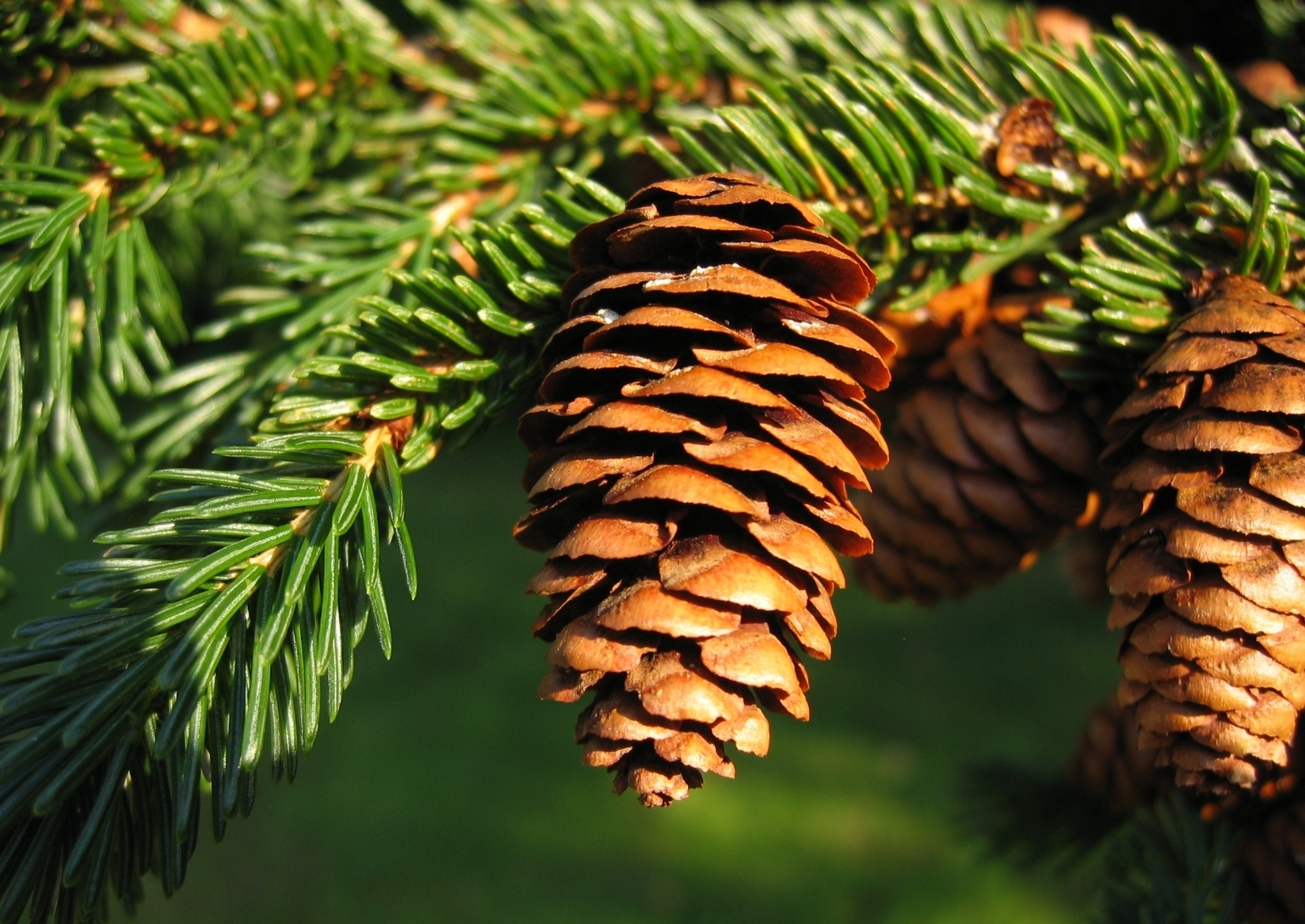
Red spruce on Mount Greylock

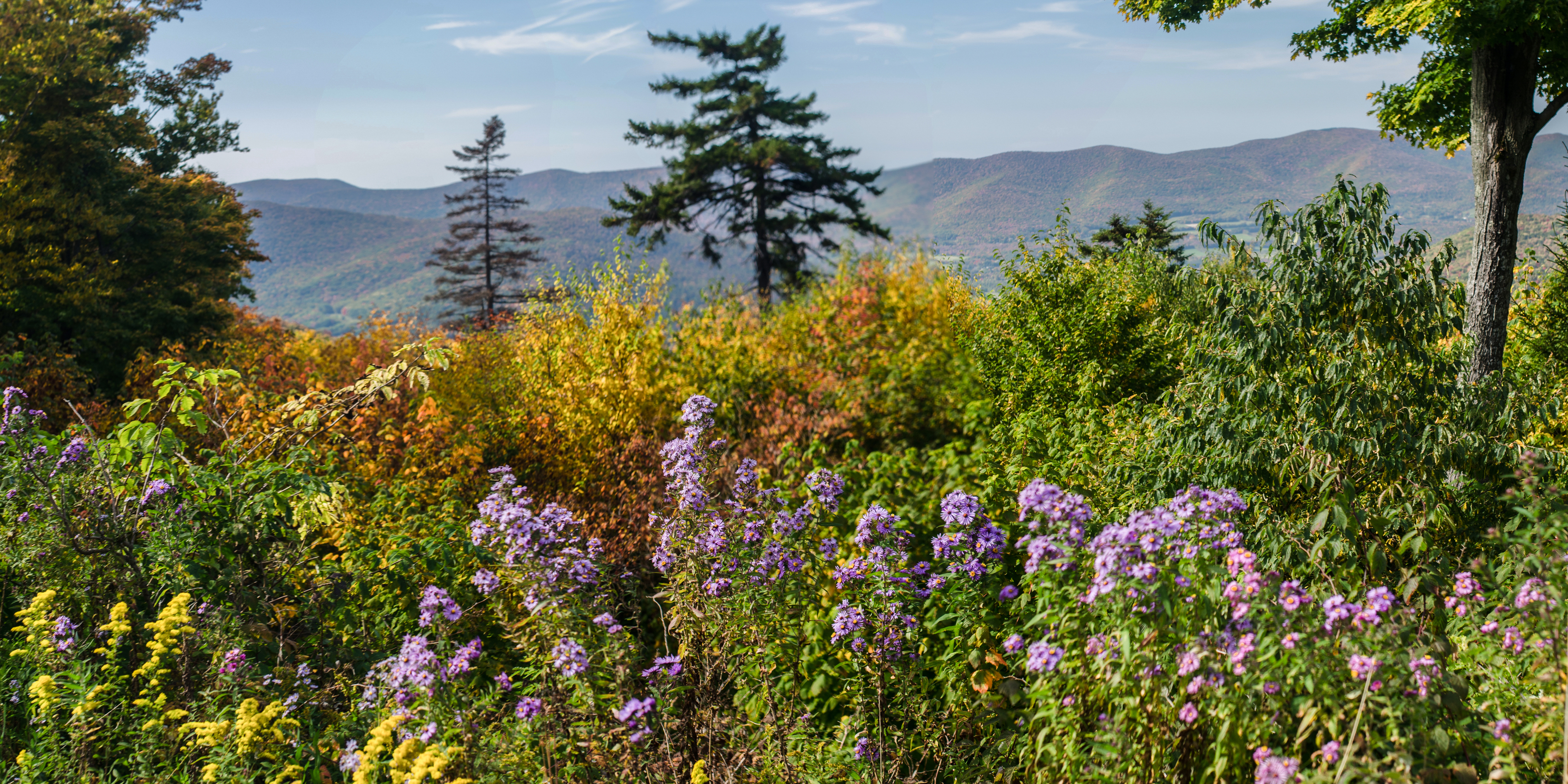
New England aster on Mount Greylock

Northern hardwood forest characterize lower and mid-elevations, while upper slopes are covered with balsam fir and red spruce as well as American mountain ash. About 555 acres (225 hectares) of old growth forest have been inventoried within the Greylock Range, including tree specimens up to 350 years old. On the western slope was a 120-foot-tall (37 m) red spruce.

There are purported records of 132 bird species on the mountain. These include the blackpoll warbler and Bicknell's thrush which breed exclusively in boreal forest, with limited opportunities elsewhere in Massachusetts.

== Geology ==
Mount Greylock is part of the much larger Taconic Allochthon, a structure that migrated to its present position from 25 miles to the east. The rocks moved via thrust faulting, a tectonic process by which older rock is thrust over and above younger rock.

More narrowly, the local massif is mostly "Greylock Schist," a term used by geologists starting in 1891 and much more recently, although the age of these rocks had been uncertain into the 1960s. This Ordovician schist is about 1,000 to 2,000 feet thick on Greylock and "consists of muscovite (sericite), chlorite, and quartz schist." It lies above a formation called "Bellows Pipe Limestone." This younger, underlying layer has been quarried on the lower slopes of the mountain.

Successive episodes of ice-age glaciation rounded the mountain, leaving glacial erratics such as "Balance Rock" on Greylock in Lanesborough. The Laurentide Ice Sheet had covered the region up to a depth of one kilometer (or 3,281 feet). In melting, it formed Lake Bascom in the upper Hoosic Valley. The remains of lake beaches are evident at several places on the lowest slopes of Greylock.

Geologists used Surface Exposure Dating in 2018 to measure the rate of Pleistocene de-glaciation of the region. This method offered data in support of a more rapid melting rate in New England compared with earlier estimates.

== Name ==
"Mount Greylock" as the mountain's present name "probably originated with Williams College Professor Albert Hopkins" (1807–1872) or another local professor of the same era, according to one 1988 source. The peak's namesake, Gray Lock(c. 1670–1750) was an Abenaki tribal figure from near Westfield, Massachusetts, known for raiding English outposts near the Connecticut River and not historically associated with the mountain.

The 18th century English may have called the peak "Grand Hoosuc," although Timothy Dwight IV referred to it as "Saddle Mountain" in his travel memoir concerning the late 18th century.

In the early 19th century it was called "Saddleback Mountain" because of its appearance seen from the south. According to a 1838 journal entry (posthumously published 1868), Nathaniel Hawthorne overheard a local resident calling it "Graylock." Hawthorne added that Saddleback "is a more usual name for it." Yet elsewhere Hawthorne simply called it Graylock, attributing this name to the mountain's frequent appearance in winter frost.

Nonetheless, as of 1841, Edward Hitchcock's authoritative "Final Report" on state geology called the entire massif "Saddle Mountain" and "the highest point of the summit" according to Hitchcock was called "Graylock." .

== Historic District ==
Three structures contribute to the 1930s "Mount Greylock Summit Historic District," which is part of the National Register of Historic Places as of 1998. These are the Bascom Lodge and the Thunderbolt Ski Shelter, both designed by Pittsfield architect, Joseph McArthur Vance, and the War Memorial Tower designed by Boston-based Maginnis & Walsh. Together, their cultural significance as period architecture was cited in the register

=== Bascom Lodge ===
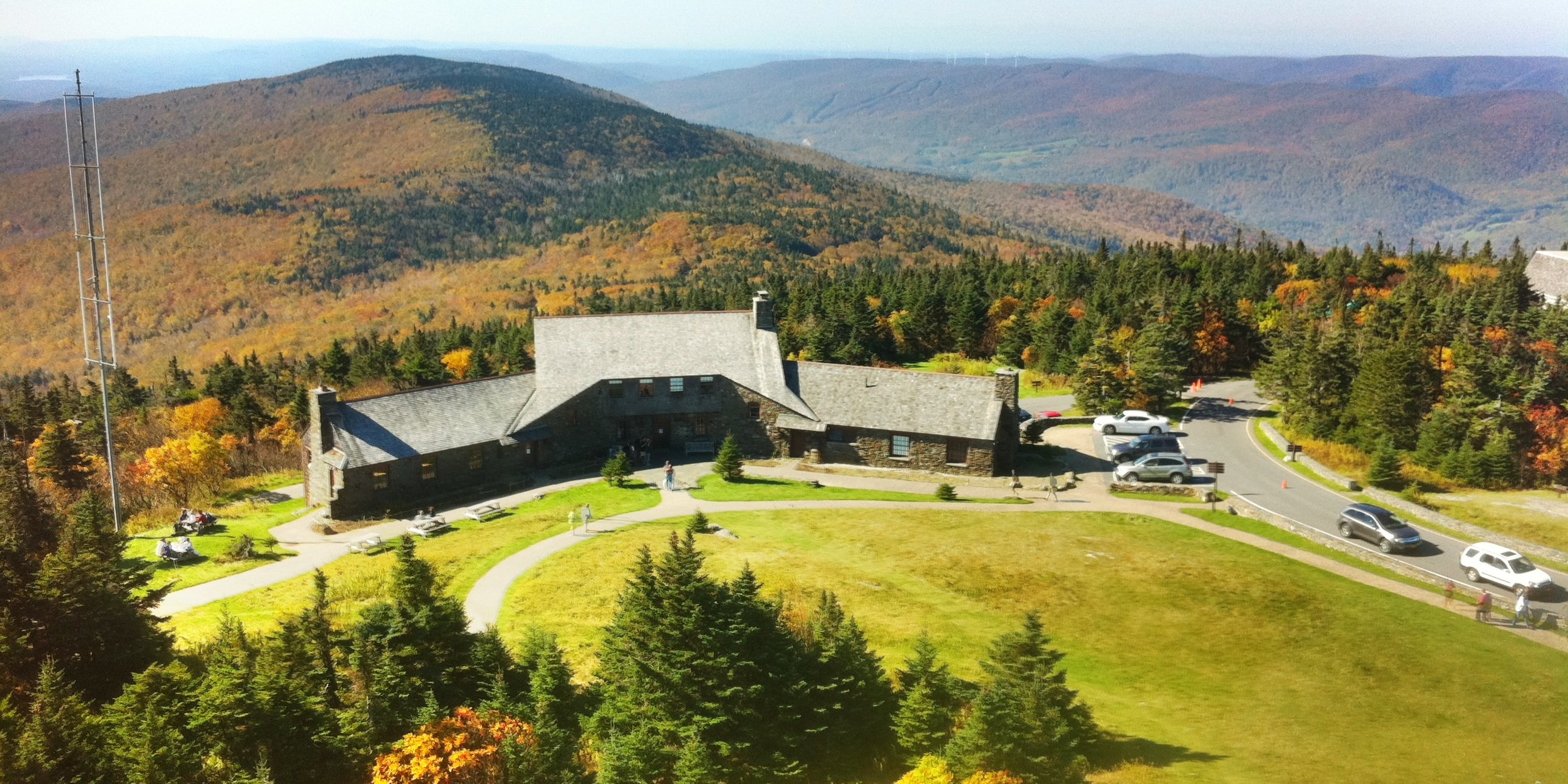
Bascom Lodge and Saddle Ball Mountain looking southwest from the War Memorial Tower

Bascom Lodge was built between 1932 and 1938 using native materials of Greylock schist and red spruce and characterized by the rustic design of period park structures. The Greylock Commission sought a more substantial shelter to replace an earlier summit house (built c.1902; destroyed by fire in 1929). The initial west wing was constructed in 1932 by Jules Emil Deloye Jr. The main-central and east wings were completed later 1935–38 by the Civilian Conservation Corps, supervised by Deloye. The lodge was named in honor of John Bascom, a Greylock Reservation Commissioner and local professor (d. 1911).

For the winter of 1937–38, the Greylock Commission hired Harrison L. Lasuer to spend the season living in the lodge "to act as host to skiers and other Winter enthusiasts who scale the mountain.". The building was equipped for that winter with "steam heat, electricity and a telephone," according to a New York City newspaper. A ski race later that season attracted 7,000 spectators, mainly near the base of the mountain (see ref. below).

Today (2025) Bascom Lodge is run (in warmer months only) by a service company under a concession-type lease from the state. Among other earlier arrangements, the Appalachian Mountain Club managed the lodge for 16 summers ending in 2000.

=== Thunderbolt Ski Shelter, Trail and Race Series ===
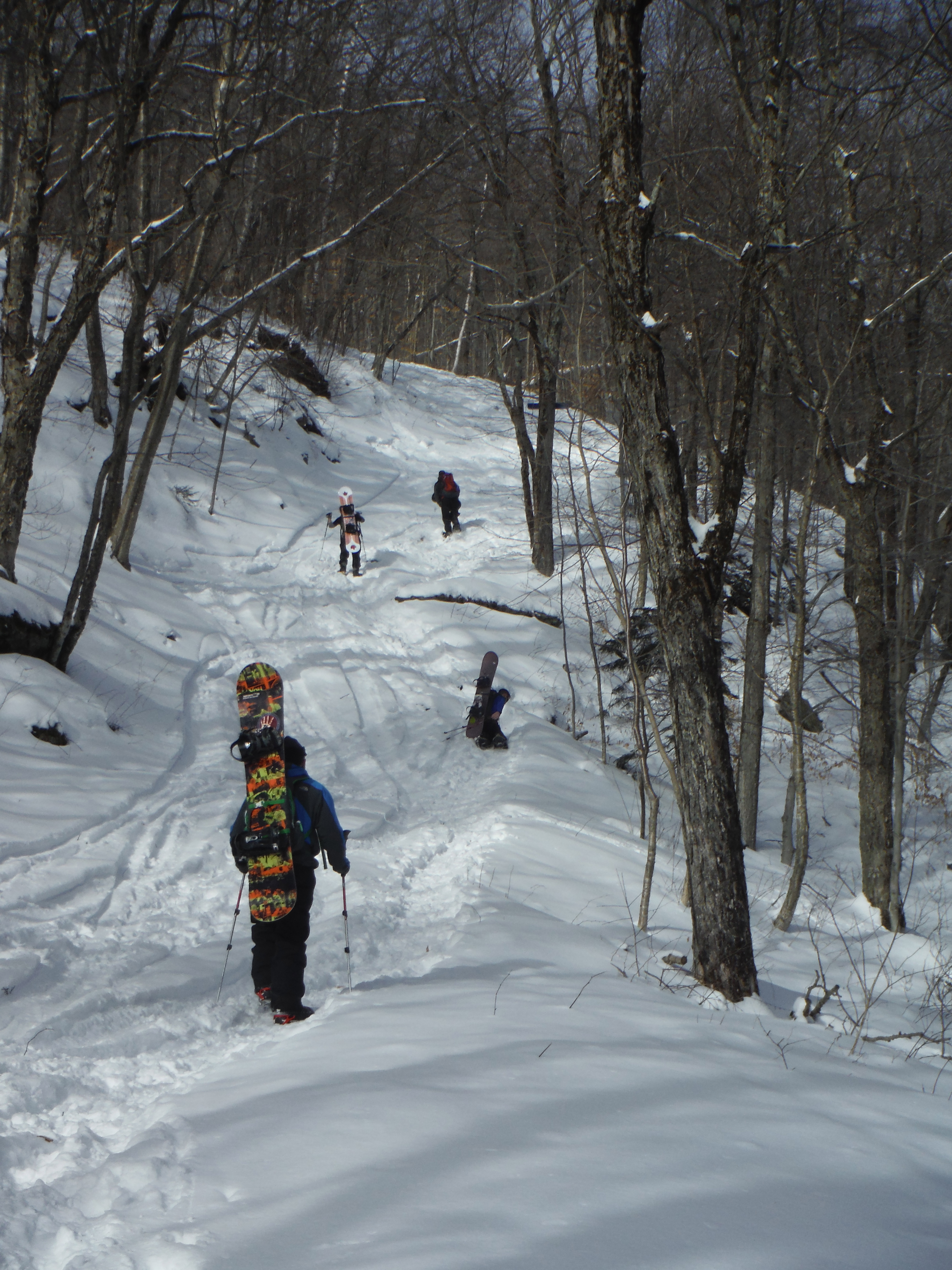
Snowboarders ascending near the Needles Eye on the Thunderbolt, January 2015

The Thunderbolt Ski Shelter, also designed by Joseph McArthur Vance, was built in 1940 by the Civilian Conservation Corps (CCC) as a warming hut for skiers using the Thunderbolt Trail.

Like the nearby lodge, the shelter is rustic in design and built of local stone and wood beams; the interior has four wooden benches built into a large four-hearth fireplace in the center. It is several hundred feet north of the summit tower.

Although Bascomb Lodge reportedly employed a resident winter innkeeper in 1938 (see above citation), the 1940 introduction of this nearby shelter may have made a seasonal shut-down of the lodge less inconvenient during large-scale ski events of the era.

This trail was designed with help from numerous ski groups and cut by the CCC in 1934. Major competitive ski races were held on here almost annually from 1935 until 1948. Among the largest was a 1938 event attended by 7,000 spectators, who watched Fritz Dehmel of Nazi Germany set a course record of 2 minutes and 25 seconds. Famed U.S. skier Dick Durrance placed fifth in this race, which pre-dated the Thunderbolt shelter. Dehmel's record for the 1.4-mile course held until 1948. The trail is similar in steepness to the longer Sherburne Trail of Pinkham Notch, New Hampshire.

The Thunderbolt ski race was revived in 2010 and in certain subsequent years, but a lack of snow disrupted or relocated some of the events to commercial ski areas with artificial snow. In 2018, the race group said it would switch to "less frequent intervals" for the event, instead of annually. Separately, a 1990s landslide area on the eastern face of Greylock that is unrelated to the Thunderbolt trail was reportedly skied in 2005

=== Veterans War Memorial Tower ===
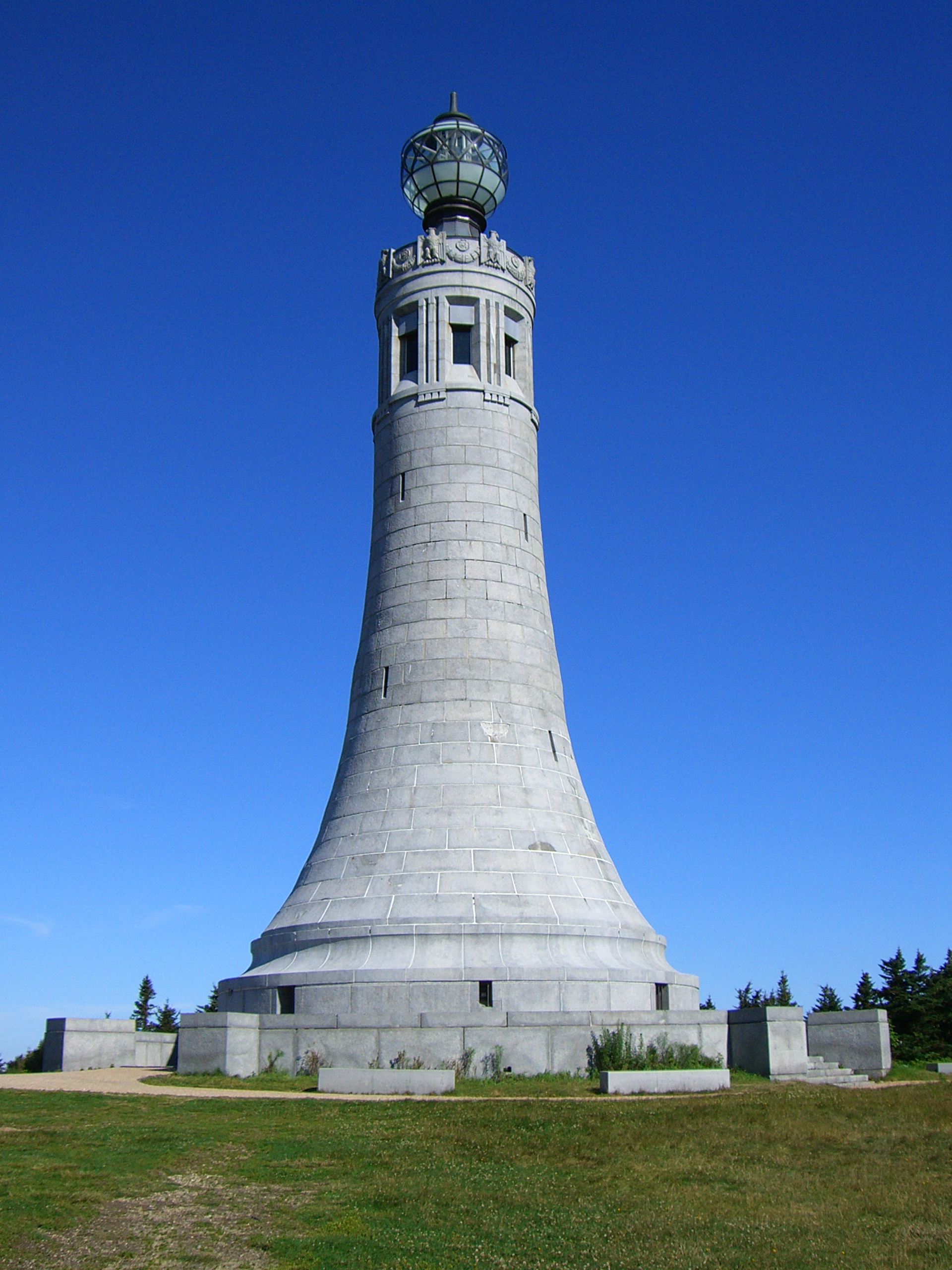
Veterans War Memorial Tower

The Veterans War Memorial Tower was approved by the state legislature in 1930, supported by local lawmakers and Governor Frank G. Allen. It was completed two years later at a cost of $200,000 by contractors J.G. Roy & Son of Springfield. An estimated 1,500 people attended the 1933 dedication by Governor Joseph B. Ely, an event broadcast nationally over NBC radio.

The 93-foot-tall (28 m) shaft with eight observation windows, was designed to display classic austerity. It includes Art Deco details, some by John Bizzozero of Quincy, whose work also appears on the Vermont Capitol building. Inside at ground level is a domed chamber intended to store tablets and war relics.

Although area legislators and residents wanted local stone, the tower's granite facing was obtained in Quincy. The tower bears various inscriptions including, "they were faithful even unto death." One of the inscriptions inside the monument reads, "Of those immortal dead who live again in the minds made better by their presence", which is a line from a poem by George Eliot. The translucent globe of light on top, originally illuminated by twelve 1,500 watt lights (now six), is said to be visible at night for 70 mi (110 km). It creates a light-pollution problem for the summit area all night long.

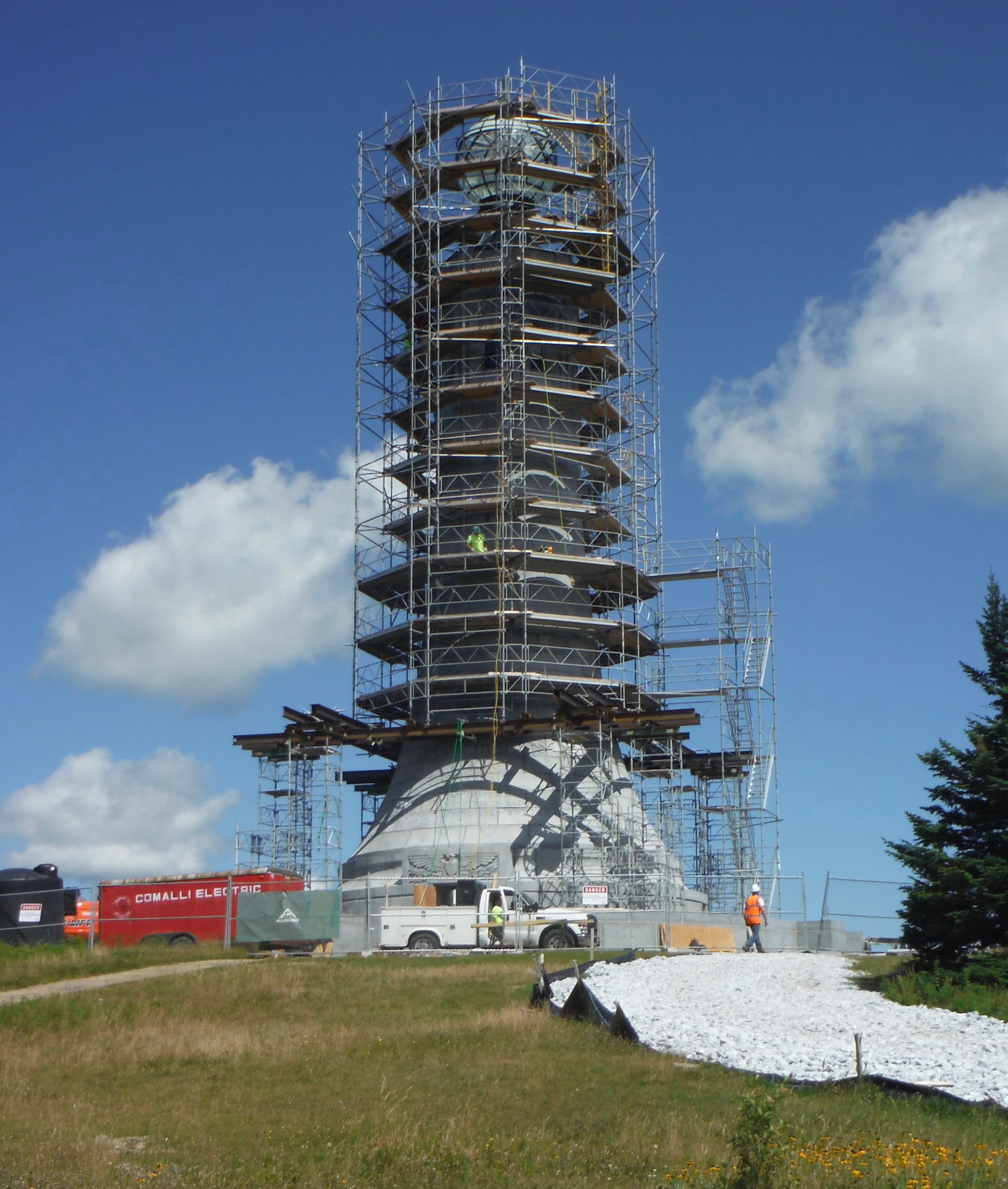
Renovations due to persistent water infiltration, August 2016

The Veterans War Memorial Tower was closed for four years beginning in 2013 because of water infiltration that caused structural damage from freezing. A $2.6-million restoration project that began in August 2015 was awarded to Allegrone Construction of Pittsfield.

=== Broadcast tower ===
Although not as part of the Historic District, one radio and one television station transmit from a broadcast tower below the summit on the west side: WAMC (90.3 Albany, New York); and W38DL (38 Adams, Massachusetts) (repeater of WNYT-TV). A NOAA Weather Radio station (WWF-48, 162.525 MHz) broadcasts from a different tower on the mountain. The Northern Berkshire Amateur Radio Club runs several amateur radio repeaters on the mountain under the callsign K1FFK.

== History ==
=== In American literature ===
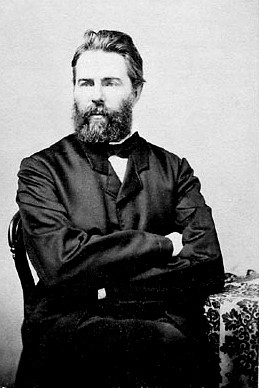
Herman Melville

By the mid-19th century, improved transportation into the region attracted many visitors to Greylock. Among them were writers and artists inspired by the mountain scene: Nathaniel Hawthorne, William Cullen Bryant, Oliver Wendell Holmes, Herman Melville, and Henry David Thoreau.

In the summer of 1838, Hawthorne had visited North Adams, Massachusetts, and climbed Mount Greylock several times. His experiences there, specifically a walk he took at midnight where he saw a burning lime kiln, inspired his story, originally titled "The Unpardonable Sin". Hawthorne had not written tales since 1844 when he wrote "Ethan Brand" in the winter of 1848–1849.

Melville is said to have taken part of his inspiration for Moby-Dick from the view of the mountain from his house Arrowhead in Pittsfield, since its snow-covered profile reminded him of a great white sperm whale's back breaking the ocean's surface. Melville dedicated his next novel, Pierre, to "Greylock's Most Excellent Majesty", calling the mountain "my own ... sovereign lord and king". In August 1851 Melville and a few friends, including the young poet Sarah Morewood, camped for a night on Greylock's summit. Thoreau summited and spent a night in July 1844. His account of this event in A Week on the Concord and Merrimack Rivers described his approach up what is today the Bellows Pipe Trail. Scholars contend that this Greylock experience transformed him, affirming his ability to do these excursions on his own, following his brother John's death; and served as a prelude to his experiment of rugged individualism at Walden Pond the following year in 1845.

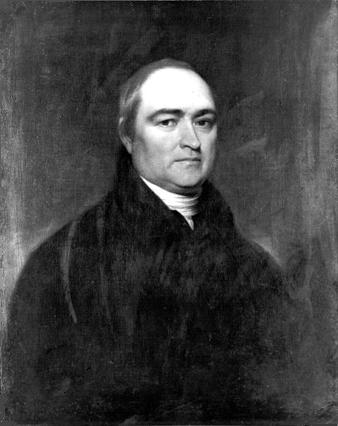
Yale University president Timothy Dwight IV climbed the mountain in 1799

Timothy Dwight IV, a once-famed poet and preacher, and president of Yale College, along with Williams College President Ebenezer Fitch, climbed Greylock in 1799, probably over a rough route cut by a local farmer Jeremiah Wilbur. Dwight's travel memoir describes the mountain: "During a great part of the year, it is either embosomed or capped by clouds, and indicates to the surrounding inhabitants the changes of weather with not a little exactness."

=== Management and development history ===
Williams College students in 1830 directed by college President Edward Dorr Griffin improved and further cut a trail from the end of the Hopper Road to the summit. This is the current Hopper Trail, traditionally climbed by Williams students once a year.

In May 1831 a wooden meteorological observatory, "Griffin's Tower", was built on the summit by students. Nine years later, it was replaced by a more substantial 60-foot (18 m) wooden tower, from which Donati's Comet was photographed in 1858. In 1863 the Alpine Club, was founded in Williamstown by Professor Albert Hopkins. The club frequently camped on the mountain and certain members later helped found the Appalachian Mountain Club and the American Alpine Club.

By the late 19th century, clearcutting had stripped most of Greylock's forest. Along with this came forest fires and landslides. The Greylock Park Association (GPA) was formed in 1885 and shares were sold locally with plans to make money by attracting tourists. The company purchased 400 acres (160 ha) on the summit and made repairs to the Notch Road. The GPA charged a 25-cent toll for the carriage road and a 10-cent fee to ascend the iron observation tower (built 1889). Together, these fees are equivalent to $12.54 in present-day dollars.

But 12 years later, with the GPA's business future imperiled by debt, local legislators proposed acquiring the company and forming Mount Greylock State Reservation. This was approved in 1898 along with plans to add to the original land (to ultimately total 12,500-acre (5,100 ha). The Berkshire County government was to maintain the reservation. Other early State Reservation properties were similarly operated by local county governments.

=== The 20th century ===
The first automobiles to the summit, via the Notch Road from the north, were a pair of steam-powered "Locomobiles' in 1902; a gasoline-powered car followed in 1904. In 1907, Berkshire County Commission opened a new road from the south to the summit, augmenting the existing northerly "Notch Road." The county subsequently attended to building hiking paths, and by 1913 had completed 17 trails. The Appalachian Trail route across the mountain was opened in 1929, and the entire Massachusetts section was mostly complete by 1931.

The Massachusetts (Veterans) War Memorial Tower on the summit was completed in 1932. During nine years ending in 1941 the Civilian Conservation Corps (CCC) worked on the mountain mostly through its 107th Company, MA camp SP-7.

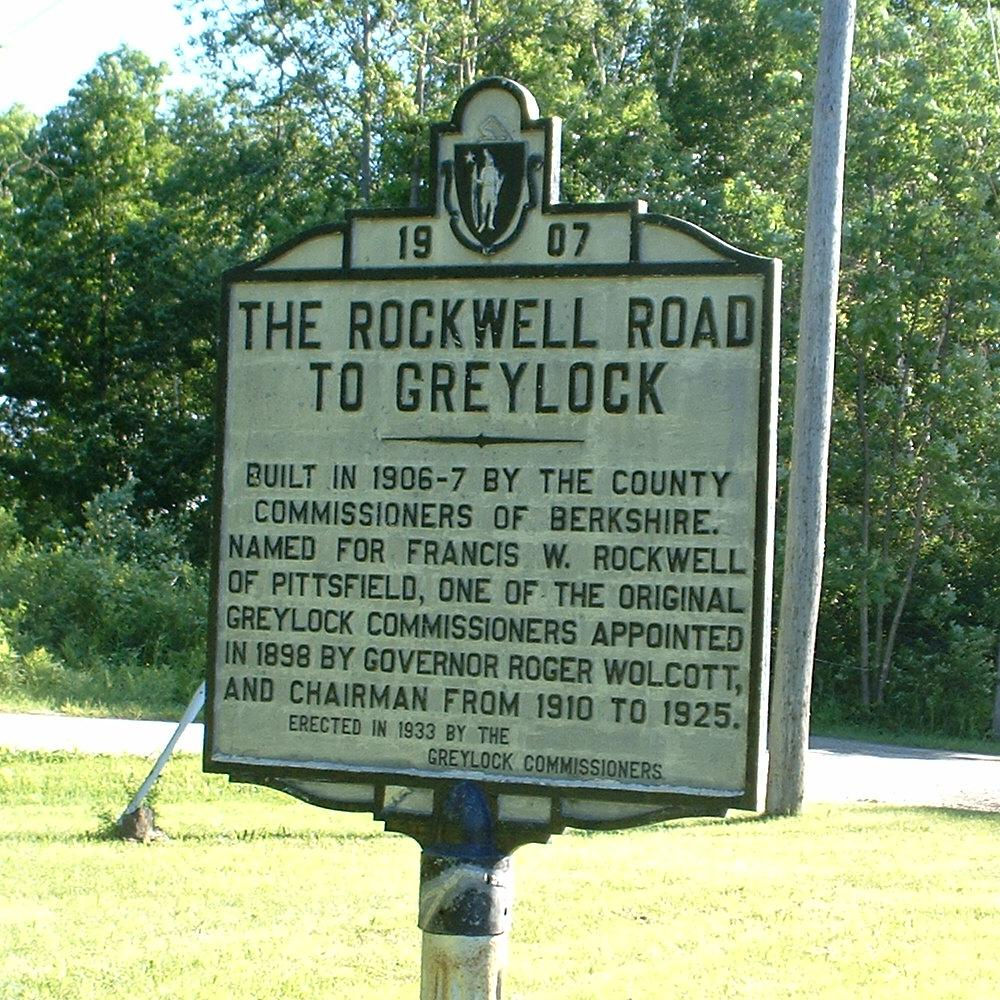
The entrance to Rockwell Road, which extends from Lanesborough to the summit of Mount Greylock in Adams

CCC work included improvements to the road system (gravel surfaced), Adirondack lean-to shelters, the Thunderbolt Ski Shelter and its related trail, along with constructing much of Bascom Lodge.

Starting in 1954, the Greylock Tramway Authority was formed to build an aerial tramway on the mountain. After the authority announced plans for a ski resort in 1964, a local conservation group called the Mount Greylock Protective Association led a campaign to shift the Reservation to state management from Berkshire County. This succeeded in 1966 and helped to block the resort.

== State parks ==
The 12,500-acre (5,100 ha) Mount Greylock State Reservation is managed and operated by the Massachusetts Department of Conservation and Recreation.

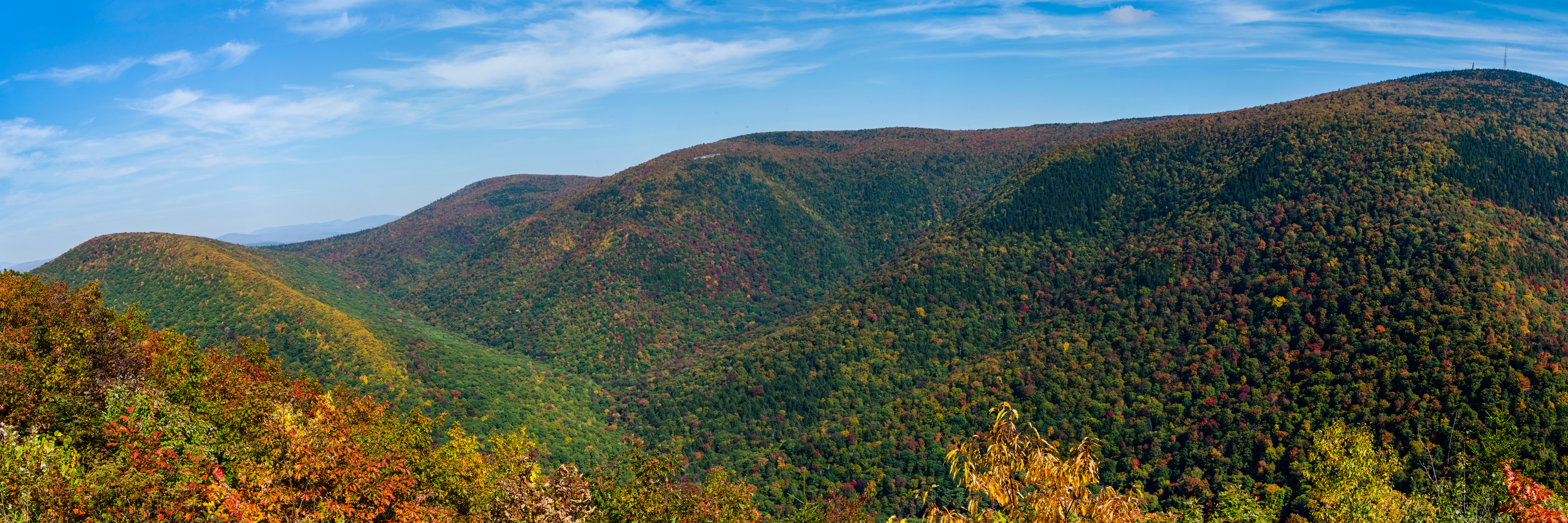
Mount Greylock State Reservation (Greylock summit on the far right)

Mount Greylock has about 70 miles of hiking paths including an 11.5 mile section of the Appalachian National Scenic Trail. Primitive camping for backpackers is permitted at several sites. The staffed visitors' center in Lanesborough is open year-round (1.5 miles off Route 7).

The Greylock Glen, site of a former proposed tramway/ski/resort development from 1953 to 1977, is a 1,063-acre (430-hectare) park in Adams, adjoining Mount Greylock State Reservation. It was acquired by the state in 1985 for joint public-private development.

== In popular culture ==
- Mount Greylock (Gray-lock) is mentioned in Nathaniel Hawthorne's 1850 short story "Ethan Brand" (From The Snow-Image, and Other Twice-told Tales, 1850, 1852) as well as his posthumous "American Notebooks."
- Mount Greylock is the dedicatee of Herman Melville's 1852 novel Pierre; or, The Ambiguities, written at his home in Pittsfield, MA.
- Mount Greylock is mentioned in Bill Bryson's 1998 book A Walk in the Woods.
- Mount Greylock is the location of Ilvermorny, the North American school of witchcraft and wizardry in the fictional universe of Harry Potter.
- Mount Greylock is a setting for the Analog horror series "The Greylock Tapes".
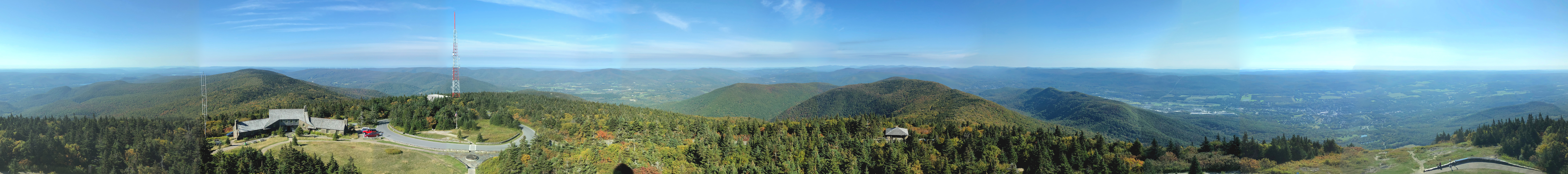
Stitched 360-degree panorama from the Veterans War Memorial Tower on top of Mount Greylock

== See also ==
- Outline of Massachusetts
- Index of Massachusetts-related articles
- List of U.S. states by elevation
- List of old growth forests in Massachusetts
