= Mount Greylock State Reservation =

Protected area in Massachusetts, United States

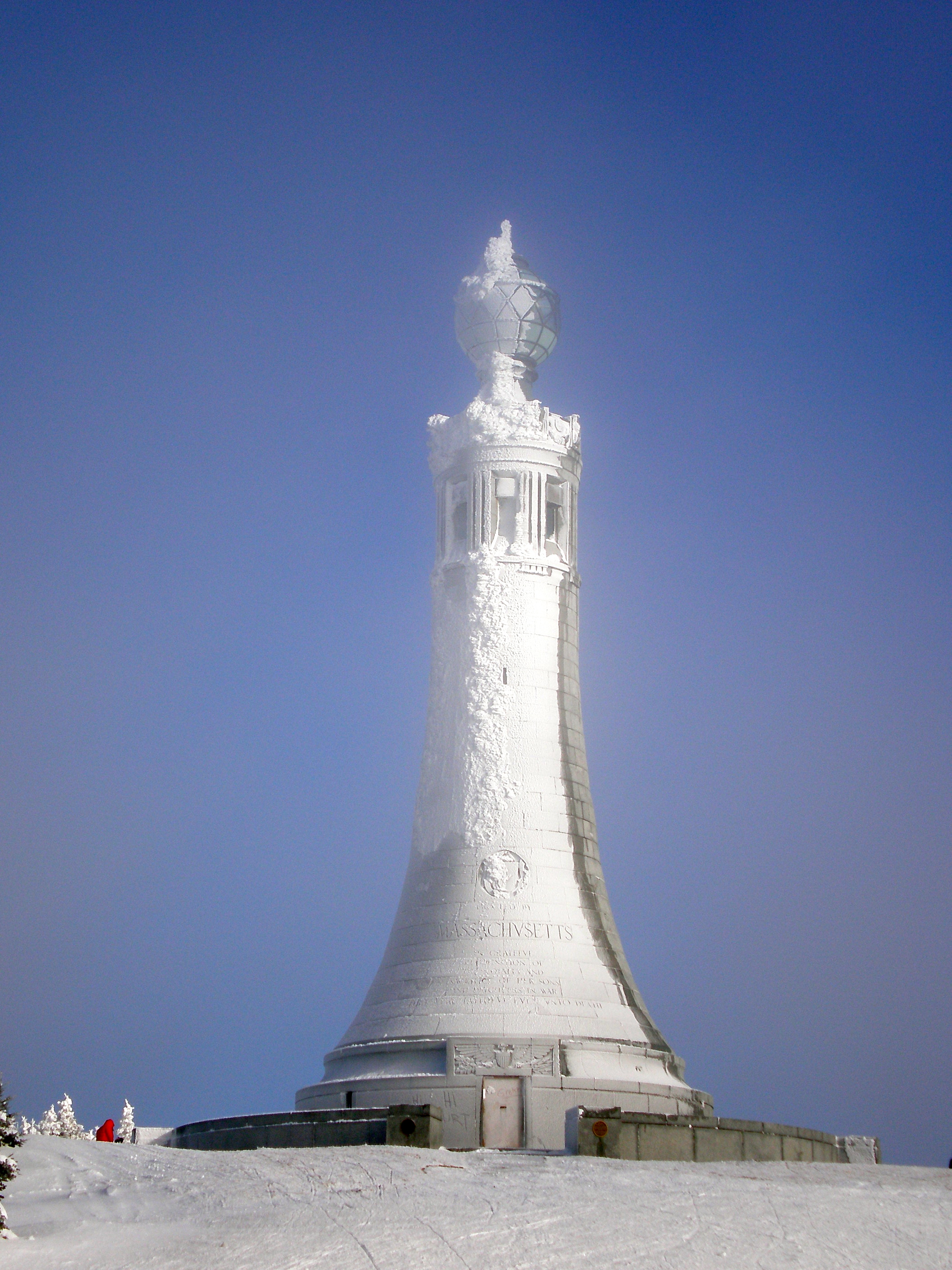
- Winter view of the War Memorial at the summit of Mount Greylock

- Location within Massachusetts Location within the United States
- Location: Adams, Cheshire, Lanesborough, New Ashford, North Adams, and Williamstown, Massachusetts, United States
- Coordinates: 42°38′14″N 73°09′57″W
- Area: 12,455 acres (50.40 km^{2})
- Elevation: 3,491 ft (1,064 m)
- Established: 1898
- Administrator: Massachusetts Department of Conservation and Recreation
- Website: Official website

Mount Greylock State Reservation is public recreation and nature preservation area on and around Mount Greylock, the highest point in the U.S. state of Massachusetts. The park covers some 12,000 acres (4,900 ha) in the towns of Lanesborough, North Adams, Adams, Cheshire, Williamstown and New Ashford, Massachusetts. It was created in 1898 as Massachusetts' first public land for the purpose of forest preservation.

== History ==
Mount Greylock State Reservation was created in 1898 when the state legislature passed Chapter 543 of the Acts of 1898, which appropriated $25,000 for land purchases and created the Greylock Reservation Commission as overseer.

The 93-foot-tall (28 m) Veterans War Memorial Tower that crowns the summit of the mountain was built 1931-32 and dedicated on June 30, 1933.

Workers with the Civilian Conservation Corps were active in the reservation during the 1930s. Their efforts, undertaken from 1933 to 1939, included construction of the Bascom Lodge, the Thunderbolt Ski Trail, Thunderbolt Shelter, and improved road access to the summit.

A two-year Historic Parkway Rehabilitation Project undertaken during 2008 and 2009 restored the reservation's road system, offering numerous scenic viewing opportunities along the state-designated Scenic Byway.

== Activities and amenities ==
Roads to the summit of Mount Greylock are open seasonally, weather permitting. At the summit, Bascom Lodge offers overnight accommodations and meals during non-winter months. The reservation's 70 miles (110 km) of trails for hiking, mountain biking, back-country skiing, snowshoeing and snowmobiling include an 11.5-mile (18.5 km) section of the Appalachian National Scenic Trail and the historic Thunderbolt Ski Trail. Primitive camping is available for backpackers at either the Mount Greylock Campground or remote trailside backpacker shelters, all of which are only accessible by foot. Hunting is permitted in season.
