= Mohawk Trail State Forest =

Protected area in Massachusetts, United States

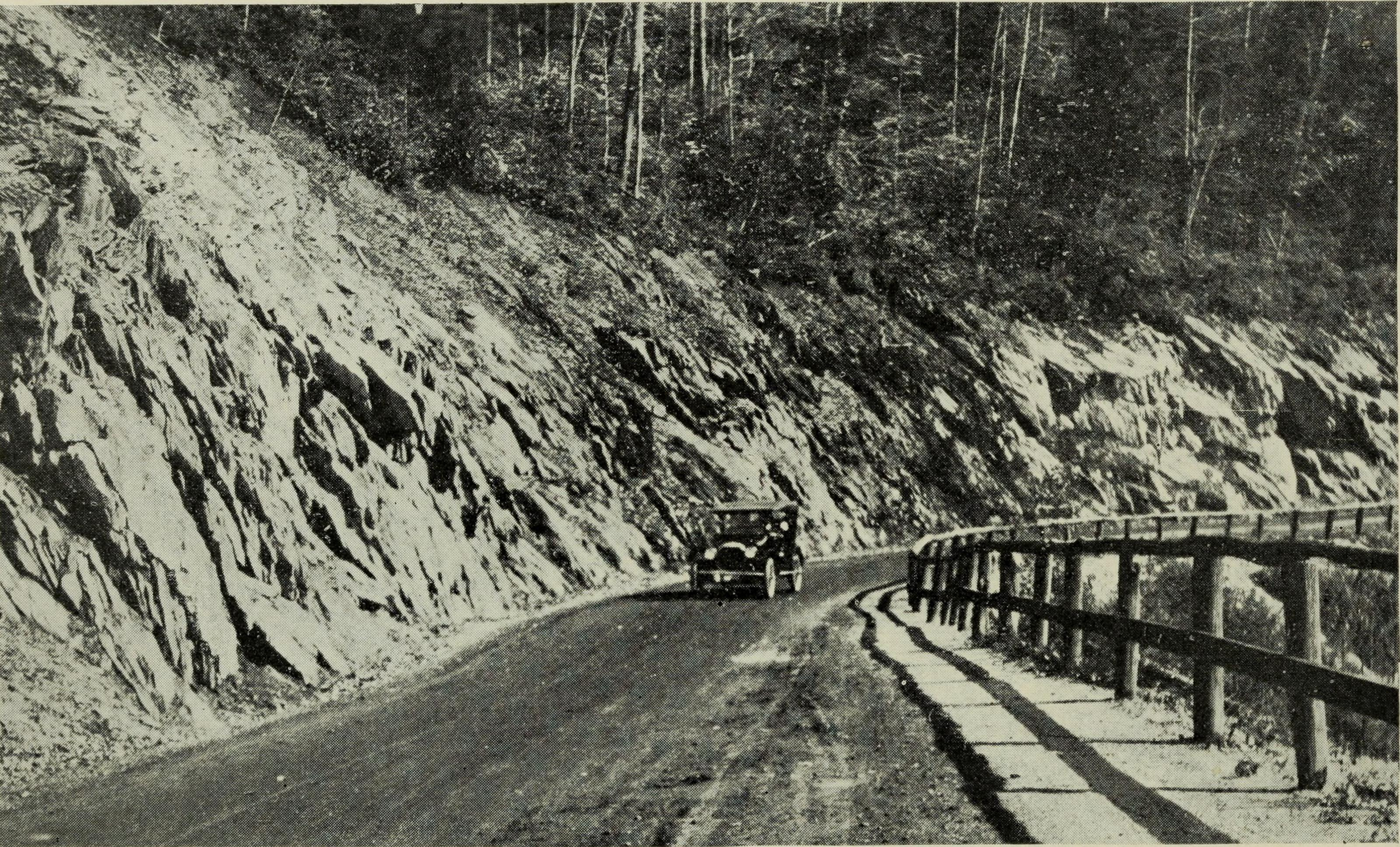
- A car driving the Mohawk Trail (1920)

- Location within Massachusetts Location within the United States
- Location: Charlemont, Hawley and Savoy, Massachusetts, United States
- Coordinates: 42°38′49″N 72°56′33″W
- Area: 7,758 acres (3,140 ha)
- Elevation: 1,696 ft (517 m)
- Established: 1921
- Administrator: Massachusetts Department of Conservation and Recreation
- Website: Official website

Mohawk Trail State Forest is a publicly owned state forest in the U.S. state of Massachusetts with recreational features located in the towns of Charlemont, Hawley, and Savoy. It covers more than 7,700 acres (3,100 ha) of mountain ridges, gorges, and old-growth forests at elevations ranging from around 600 to 2,080 feet. It is managed by the Department of Conservation and Recreation.

== History ==
The forest is named for the old Mohawk Trail (now Massachusetts Route 2), a Native American footpath that connected the Hudson and Connecticut River valleys. The forest was created in 1921 when the state purchased acreage for the express purpose of preserving the area's scenic beauty and historic associations. Two Civilian Conservation Corps camps were established here in the 1930s. Their contributions included the construction of an administration building and four rental cabins and the expansion of a campground built in the 1920s by the state.

== Natural features ==
The forest is crossed by two main rivers, the Deerfield River and the Cold River. Several small streams support various species of trout. Other wildlife that may be seen include deer, bobcats, and black bears.

=== Old growth and tall (2nd growth) trees ===
Mohawk Trail State Forest is specifically known for its tall old growth trees. A total of 612 acres (248 ha) of the state forest is classified as pre-settlement by researchers. Trees approaching 500 years in age have been confirmed. Most of the extremely old trees are Eastern hemlock. Other species reaching significant age include yellow and black birch, sugar maple, red spruce, and northern red oak. Specimens of examples of all these species exceed 300 years in age and numerous trees of a dozen species surpass 200 years. Trees over 150 years old in Mohawk are very common.

In addition to the old growth, Mohawk Trail State Forest contains many of the tallest trees in Massachusetts as verified by the Eastern Native Tree Society. Most of these tallest trees are between 100 and 200 years old and are properly classified as second growth. The Eastern white pine is tallest. As of the end of the 2011 growing season, 122 eastern white pines had been measured to heights of 150 feet or more and 14 surpass 160 feet (49 m). The tallest accurately measured single tree as tracked by the Eastern Native Tree Society in the New England grows in Mohawk and measured 169.6 feet (51.7 m) in height at the end of the 2011 growing season. The tree is named for Mohawk dignitary, the late Chief Jake Swamp. Of public properties in the Northeast, only Cook Forest State Park in Pennsylvania rivals Mohawk Trail State Forest in the 150-foot (46 m) and over height class. The present count for Cook Forest as determined by the Eastern Native Tree Society and the Pennsylvania Department of Conservation and Natural Resources is 112. The Eastern Native Tree Society maintains records of all white pines in the Northeast confirmed to a height of 150 feet or more.

In addition to the white pine, the white ash also reaches to heights of 150 feet (46 m) in Mohawk Trail State Forest. Two trees have been measured to over 150 feet and around 20 surpass 140 feet (43 m) in height. Altogether, 7 native species exceed 130 feet, 12 native species exceed 120 feet (37 m), and 20 native species exceed 100 feet (30 m) in height.

Mohawk Trail State Forest currently boasts 18 tall tree champions.. However, many of these champion trees are not conspicuously large in girth. They have grown exceptionally tall in the rich, moist, protected ravines of the central Berkshires. Note that what is being described are champion tall trees, which are not to be confused with official state champion trees. The latter are based on weighted measurements of girth, height, and crown spread to arrive at composite scores suggestive of overall size. The national champion sugar maple listed in the National Register of Big Trees grows in the State Forest.

The Mahican-Mohawk Trail and the colonial Mohawk Trail road to the lower meadows both pass through some of the tallest of the pines. The Mahican-Mohawk Recreational Trail passes through some of the old growth as it climbs the Todd-Clark Ridge on the north side.

== Activities and amenities ==
The park features wooded campsites and rental cabins, trails for hiking, walking, and cross-country skiing, and a day-use area with swimming pool and picnic area. The forest also offers fishing, canoeing, interpretive programs, and restricted hunting.

== See also ==
- Hail to the Sunrise
- List of old growth forests in Massachusetts
