= Crum Hill =

Mountain in Massachusetts, United States

Highest point
- Elevation: 2,841 ft (866 m)
- Prominence: 335 ft (102 m)
- Coordinates: 42°42′40″N 73°01′11″W

Geography
- Location: Monroe, Massachusetts
- Parent range: Hoosac Range/ The Berkshires

Geology
- Mountain type: metamorphic rock

Climbing
- Easiest route: No official trail

Crum Hill, 2,841 feet (866 m), located in northwest Massachusetts, United States, in the towns of Monroe and Florida, is the highest point in Franklin County and the highest point within the Berkshire range. As the distant mountain, Mount Greylock is part of the Taconic Range and not the Berkshires. It is part of the Hoosac Range (a west facing escarpment rising from the Hoosic River Valley directly east of North Adams, Massachusetts), is crossed by a trail system maintained by a local snowmobile club, the Florida Mountaineers. They maintain a trail map on their website.

Although Crum Hill is the highest geologic point of the Berkshires, Mount Greylock, 3,491 feet (1,064 m), part of the Taconic Mountains and unrelated to the Berkshires geology, is often misattributed with the high point.

The summit of Crum Hill is located in the town of Monroe, Franklin County; the west side of the mountain is located in the town of Florida, part of Berkshire County. The north and east sides of Crum Hill drain into Dunbar Brook, thence into the Deerfield River, the Connecticut River, and Long Island Sound; the west side drains into the Cold River, thence into the Deerfield River; and the south side drains into the Deerfield River via several small brooks.

The summit is also the site of the Hoosac Wind Power Project.
