= Charles H. McCann Technical School =

Coordinates: 42.6744°N 73.1003°W

Location
- 70 Hodges Cross Road; North Adams, Massachusetts 01247; United States

Information
- Status: Open
- School district: Northern Berkshire Vocational Regional School District
- Superintendent: James J. Brosnan
- CEEB code: 221575
- Principal: Justin Kratz
- Faculty: 46
- Teaching staff: 48.42 (FTE)
- Grades: 9-12 and Post Secondary
- Age: 14 to 18
- Enrollment: 520 (2023-2024)
- Average class size: 14.1 (2014)
- Student to teacher ratio: 10.74
- Language: English
- Hours in school day: 6.75
- Classrooms: 35
- Colors: Green and white
- Athletics: Football, Basketball, Baseball, Lacrosse, Softball, Cross-Country, Cheerleading, Soccer, Golf, Bowling, and Co-op Sports
- Mascot: Hornet
- Budget: $10,122,493 total $22,726 per pupil (2016)
- Website: www.mccanntech.org

Charles H. McCann Technical School is a technical school located in North Adams, Massachusetts, United States that serves grades 9-12. It serves the Northern Berkshire Vocational Regional School District made up of the City of North Adams, and the towns of Adams, Williamstown, Cheshire, Lanesborough, Clarksburg, Florida, Savoy, and Monroe, with tuition-based students coming from various other towns. In the high school, during the 2014-2015 school year, McCann had an enrollment of 500 students. McCann also provides a Post Secondary program.

== History ==
1962 - McCann Tech was built at former boxer training site at 70 Hodges Cross Road in North Adams, Massachusetts and was an all-boys school until the 1970s.

1969 - "D Wing" constructed on southern side of school

2008 - $1M renovation of Gym/Locker Rooms

2009 - First Varsity boys' soccer team wins Massachusetts State Vocational Championship

2010 - First Varsity Football playoff appearance in school history.

2010 - McCann's Business Professionals of America(BPA) has a record 10 teams moving on to the national competition.

2014 - First Varsity Football Division 6 Western Massachusetts Championship

== About McCann ==
McCann Technical School is one of the two high schools in North Adams, MA (Drury High School).

Academics include Math, English, History, Physical Education, Spanish, Business., and Science. In 2005, McCann began offering classes in Project Lead the Way, a comprehensive engineering program which prepares students in high tech fields. Students in this program create advanced projects that are viewed by professionals, and are able to earn as many as twelve college credits from the Rochester Institute of Technology. In 2009-2010, around half the graduating student body pursued higher education at a two or four year college/university. The other half choose to either head into the workforce or go into the military.

McCann currently has ten technical majors for high school:

- Automotive
- Business Technology
- Carpentry/Cabinetry
- Computer Assisted Design (CAD)
- Culinary Arts
- Electricity
- Information Technology
- Machine Technology
- Metal Fabrication
- Heating, ventilation, and air conditioning

In their junior and senior year, students also have the option to pursue employment in their major through the co-operative work program. Places of employment have included: Williams College, Crane & Co., and Morrison Berkshire.

Five postsecdonary programs are also offered:

- Cosmetology
- Medical Assisting
- Dental Assisting
- Practical Nursing (LPN)
- Surgical Technology

There are fifteen sports teams available during the school year (6 fall, 5 winter, and 4 spring). School athletic teams mainly compete against D-III and D-IV schools in Berkshire County and throughout Western Massachusetts, although, the football team is a D-VI program which plays mostly other D-VI schools in the Tri-County League where all teams except for McCann are from the Connecticut River Valley.

== Enrollment ==
Northern Berkshire Vocational Regional School District Enrollment
School	1993-1994	1994-1995	1995-1996	1996-1997	1997-1998	1998-1999	1999-2000	2000-2001	2001-2002	2002-2003	2003-2004	2004-2005	2005-2006	2006-2007	2007-2008	2008-2009	2009-2010	2010-2011	2011-2012	2012-2013	2013-2014	2014-2015	2015-2016
Charles H. McCann Technical High School	413	437	434	458	437	446	426	440	427	427	440	468	491	516	511	500	500	474	470	488	505	500	481
Avg. students per grade:	103.25	109.25	108.5	114.5	109.25	111.5	106.5	110	106.75	106.75	110	117	122.75	129	127.75	125	125	118.5	117.5	122	126.25	125	120.25

== School Committee ==
In 1958 the Northern Berkshire Vocational Regional School District School Committee was formed for the first time in the history of the Commonwealth for a regional trade high school. It was precedent setting and became the guide and model for other regional vocational school districts. A vocational school amendment signed into law on June 29, 1959 (appended to Chap. 518) allowed the city of North Adams to join up to 14 area towns in forming a regional school district. Normally the law permits only towns to join other towns for form regional school districts. Originally there were nine communities interested in forming the regional school district, but only 7 decided to continue. The district communities were North Adams, Adams, Clarksburg, Florida, Monroe, Savoy and Williamstown. The district revised its original agreement in 2012 adding the towns of Cheshire and Lanesborough.

The district committee has no official ties with municipal school committees and operates “like a separate municipality”. Representation is based on population.

The Northern Berkshire Vocational Regional School District Committee hires the superintendent who is responsible for the district’s operations.

== Notable alumni ==
- Paul Babeau, sheriff of Pinal County, Arizona
