= Clarksburg, Massachusetts =

- Town
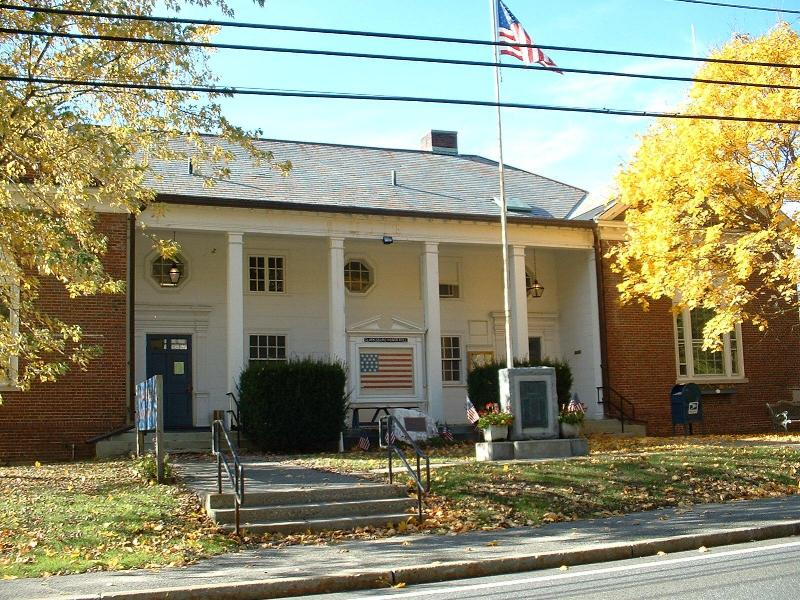
- Clarksburg Town Hall on an autumn day in 2004.

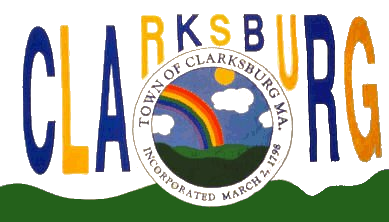
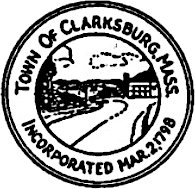
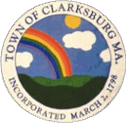
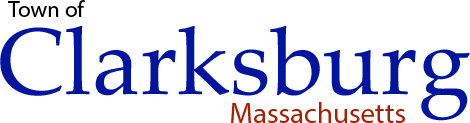
- Flag Seal Coat of arms Wordmark

- Location in Berkshire County and Massachusetts.
- Coordinates: 42°43′1″N 73°5′34″W
- Country: United States
- State: Massachusetts
- County: Berkshire
- Settled: 1764
- Incorporated: 1798

Government
  - Type: Open town meeting

Area
  - Total: 12.9 sq mi (33.3 km^{2})
  - Land: 12.7 sq mi (33.0 km^{2})
  - Water: 0.077 sq mi (0.2 km^{2})
- Elevation: 1,138 ft (347 m)

Population (2020)
  - Total: 1,657
  - Density: 130/sq mi (50.2/km^{2})
- Time zone: UTC-5 (Eastern)
  - Summer (DST): UTC-4 (Eastern)
- ZIP code: 01247
- Area code: 413
- FIPS code: 25-14010
- GNIS feature ID: 0619417
- Website: clarksburgma.gov/index.php/

Clarksburg is a town in Berkshire County, Massachusetts, United States. It is part of the Pittsfield, Massachusetts Metropolitan Statistical Area. The population was 1,657 at the 2020 census.

== History ==
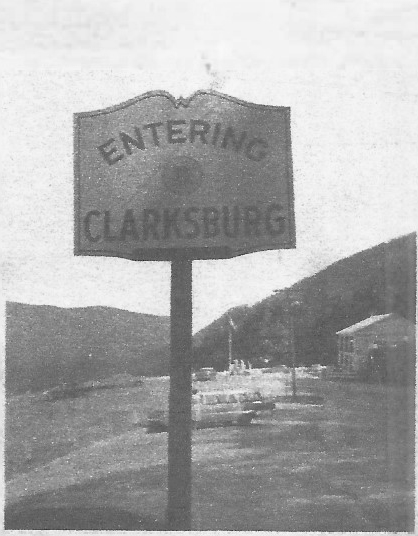
Clarksburg in the early 1960s

Clarksburg was first settled in 1764 and officially incorporated in 1798.

Captain Matthew Ketchum, Colonel William Bullock, and Nicholas Clark are credited with settling the area in 1769; Clark later became Clarksburg's namesake. The town began as a mostly agrarian community, with mills springing up along the waterways in the nineteenth century. The major mills were one to make cashmere, and several mills supplied gunpowder during the Civil War. However, the industry was stopped by the town after one of the mills exploded in 1869.

== Geography ==
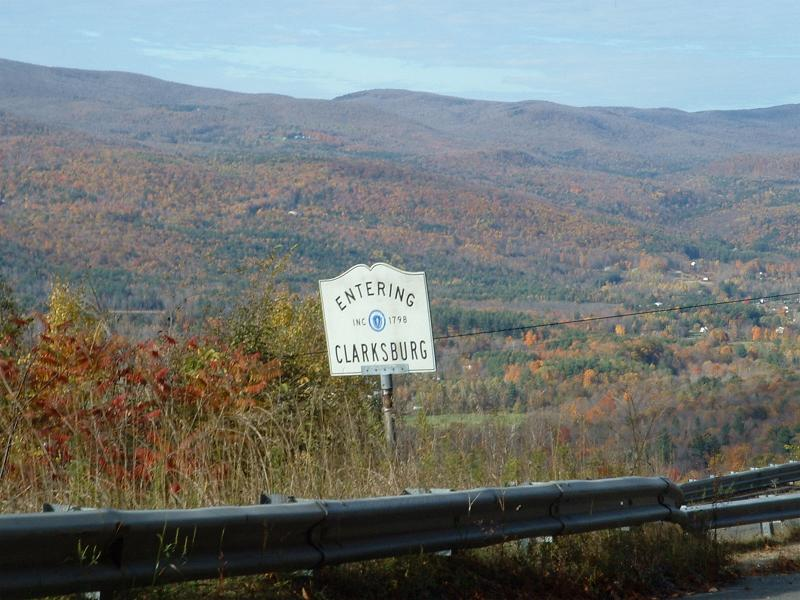
The town line along the Mohawk Trail

According to the United States Census Bureau, the town has a total area of 12.8 square miles (33 km^{2}), of which 12.8 square miles (33 km^{2}) is land and 0.1 square miles (0.26 km^{2}) (0.62%) is water.

Clarksburg is located at 42°42'42.86"N,73°05'02.97"W. Clarksburg is bordered by Pownal and Stamford, Vermont on the north, Florida on the east, North Adams on the south, and Williamstown on the west.

The town is bordered on two sides by mountains, with East Mountain and Bald Mountain to the west, and the Hoosac Range to the east. Between the two ranges, Hudson Brook and the north branch of the Hoosic River flow through the valley, merging just south of the town line. In the northern part of the valley is Clarksburg State Park, operated by the state's Department of Conservation and Recreation. The park is home to Mauserts Pond and offers picnicking, hiking, and camping, as well as other recreational activities. On the Vermont side of the border lies the Green Mountain National Forest. The Appalachian Trail crosses from north to south through the town, passing just west of the peak of East Mountain, the highest point in town, at 2,300 feet (700 m).

Route 8 is the only state route through town, and is the main road. The nearest interstate highway is Interstate 91, which is 35 miles (56 km) east of town along Route 2, also known as the Mohawk Trail, which ends just south of town and whose hairpin turn is located just within the town border near the town's southeast corner.

There is no rail service in town, and the nearest bus services are located in North Adams. The nearest regional airport is Harriman and West Airport in North Adams, and the nearest airport with national service is the Albany International Airport.

== Demographics ==
Historical population
Year	Pop.	±%
1850	384	—
1860	420	+9.4%
1870	686	+63.3%
1880	724	+5.5%
1890	884	+22.1%
1900	943	+6.7%
1910	1,207	+28.0%
1920	1,136	−5.9%
1930	1,296	+14.1%
1940	1,317	+1.6%
1950	1,630	+23.8%
1960	1,741	+6.8%
1970	1,987	+14.1%
1980	1,871	−5.8%
1990	1,745	−6.7%
2000	1,686	−3.4%
2010	1,702	+0.9%
2020	1,657	−2.6%
2022*	1,643	−0.8%
* = population estimate. Source: United States census records and Population Estimates Program data.

As of the census of 2010, there were 1,702 people, 675 households, and 507 families residing in the town. Clarksburg ranks 20th out of 32 towns in Berkshire County by population, and 302nd out of 351 cities and towns in Massachusetts. The population density was 133 inhabitants per square mile (51/km^{2}), making it the 9th most densely populated town in the county and the 273rd in the Commonwealth. There were 715 housing units at an average density of 55.9 per square mile (21.6/km^{2}). The racial makeup of the town was 98.8% White, 0.2% African American, 0.12% from other races. Hispanic or Latino of any race were 0.9% of the population.

There were 675 households, out of which 27.7% had children under the age of 18 living with them, 60.3% were married couples living together, 8.7% had a female householder with no husband present, and 24.9% were non-families. 20.3% of all households were made up of individuals, and 9.2% had someone living alone who was 65 years of age or older. The average household size was 2.52 and the average family size was 2.89.

In the town, the population was spread out, with 22.2% under the age of 19, 4.4% from 20 to 24, 21.2% from 25 to 44, 31.6% from 45 to 64, and 17.6% who were 65 years of age or older. The median age was 45 years. For every 100 females, there were 105.6 males. For every 100 females age 18 and over, there were 104 males.

The median income for a household in the town was $57,600, and the median income for a family was $62,639. Males had a median income of $49,038 versus $39,063 for females. The per capita income for the town was $28,274. About 3.5% of families and 6.2% of the population were below the poverty line, including 8.9% of those under age 18 and 1.6% of those age 65 or over.

== Government ==
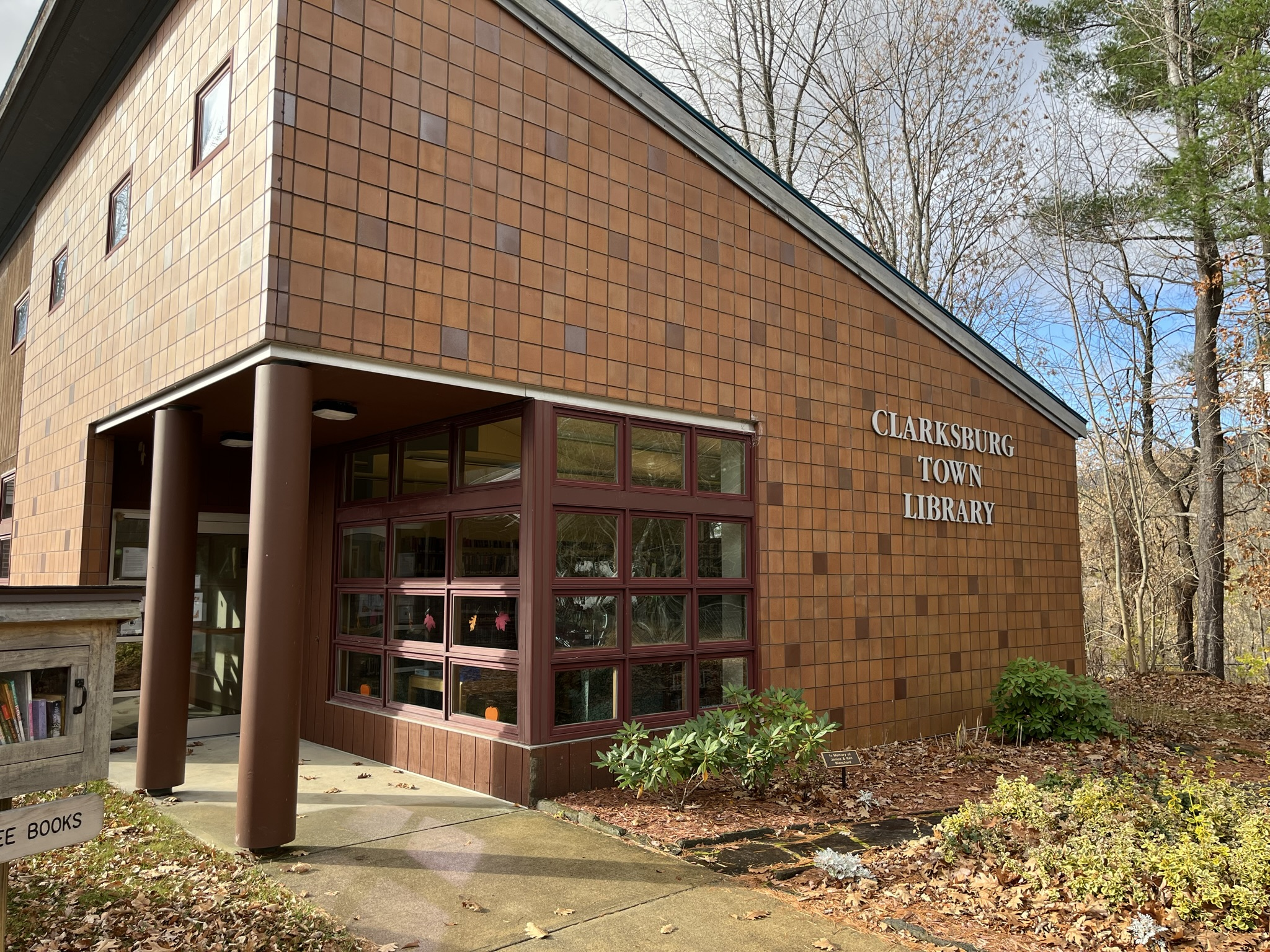
Clarksburg Town Library

Clarksburg uses the open town meeting form of government, and is governed by a board of selectmen and a town administrator. As of September 2024, the town no longer has its own police department. The town has its own volunteer fire department, and has its own public services. The town has its own library, the Clarksburg Town Library, which is connected to the regional library system. The nearest hospital, North Adams Regional Hospital, closed in 2014 and was renamed as the North Adams Campus of Berkshire Medical Center, which had numerous outpatient healthcare services. Ten years to the day of its closing, on March 28, 2024, it reopened as a hospital after serving as a 24-hour emergency hospital and de facto urgent care facility.

On the state level, Clarksburg is represented in the Massachusetts House of Representatives by the First Berkshire district, which covers northern Berkshire County, as well as portions of Franklin County. In the Massachusetts Senate, the town is represented by the Berkshire, Hampshire and Franklin district, which includes all of Berkshire County and western Hampshire and Franklin Counties. The town is patrolled by the Fourth (Cheshire) Station of Barracks "B" of the Massachusetts State Police.

On the national level, Clarksburg is represented in the United States House of Representatives as part of Massachusetts's 1st congressional district, and has been represented by Richard Neal of Springfield since January 2013. Massachusetts is represented in the United States Senate by senior Senator Elizabeth Warren and junior Senator Edward Markey.

== Education ==
The town operates its own elementary school, Clarksburg Elementary, which serves students from kindergarten through eighth grade. At high school age the town sends its students to Drury High School in North Adams, MA. Students also have the option of applying to attend Charles H. McCann Technical High School also in North Adams, and Berkshire Arts & Technology Charter Public School in Adams. There are also private schools in North Adams and Williamstown which accept students from the town.

The nearest community college is Berkshire Community College, located in Pittsfield. The nearest public college is Massachusetts College of Liberal Arts in neighboring North Adams, and the nearest university is the University of Massachusetts Amherst. The nearest private college is Williams College in Williamstown.
