= Hoosac Wind Power Project =

Wind farms built in Massachusetts

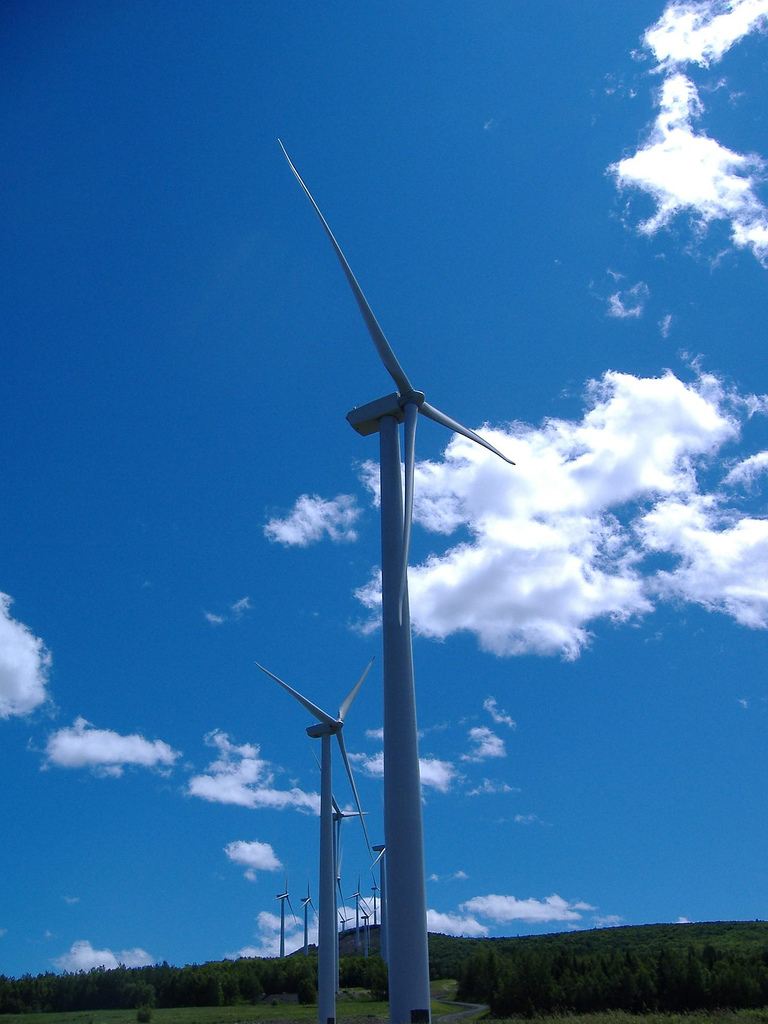
- Country: United States
- Location: Berkshire County, Massachusetts
- Coordinates: 42°43′47″N 73°1′25″W
- Status: Operational
- Construction began: August, 2011
- Commission date: December, 2012
- Construction cost: US$90 million
- Owner: Iberdola Renewables

Wind farm
- Type: Onshore
- Hub height: 213 feet (65 m)
- Rotor diameter: 252 feet (77 m)
- Site area: 75 acres
- Site elevation: 2,700 feet (820 m)

Power generation
- Units operational: 19
- Make and model: GE Wind Energy: 1.5 MW
- Nameplate capacity: 28.5 MW
- Annual net output: 7,000 MWh

External links
- Website: iberdrolarenewables.us/cs_hoosac.html

Hoosac Wind Power Project is a wind farm on Crum Hill in Monroe, Massachusetts and on Bakke Mountain in Florida, Massachusetts. Owned and operated by Iberdrola Renewables, it is the largest wind farm in Massachusetts, with 19 GE 1.5 MW wind turbines and a total installed capacity of 28.5 MW. The Hoosac Wind power project became fully operational in 2012 and provides enough electricity to power 10,000 homes annually.

== History ==
In 1980, during a Bakke Mountain hike, the Bakke family noticed the region was quite breezy. The sparse tree growth was misshapen and deformed by the strong winds. Hans Bakke began to consider the possibility of wind energy at the site. EnXco, the wind-energy company and partner of the French energy conglomerate Électricité de France, approached the Bakke family to propose building a wind farm, together they created Hoosac Wind LLC. In November 2004, the State of Massachusetts Department of Environmental Protection approved the proposed project. However, thorny issues plague the project including the presence of potentially vulnerable species of goldenrod in the vicinity of the proposed site, as well as the asserted danger to the migratory paths of birds and bats. Hoosac Wind achieved tentative approval from both Florida and Monroe after taking considerable amounts of wind-speed and direction data, along with avian, archeological, geological, and wildlife studies which were conducted as well. In January 2006, Hoosac Wind LLC was purchased by the British company PPM Energy for an estimated US$40 million, PPM was subsequently absorbed by Iberdrola Renewables. Hoosac Wind LLC was renamed New England Wind LLC. Green Berkshires, an environmental organization opposed to wind energy projects in the Berkshire mountain range, had filed an appeal rejected by the State of Massachusetts Division of Administrative Law Appeals. As of May, 2008, the project was still under review post environmental standards challenges. The project began construction in early 2012 and was completed in December 2012.

== Project details ==
The project consists of 19 GE Wind Energy 1.5 MW wind turbines and is divided among two separate sites – nine turbines on Crum Hill in Monroe, and ten on Bakke Mountain in Florida, Massachusetts. Each turbine produces 1.5 MW, the site has a capacity to produce 28.5 MW; this is enough energy to supply approximately 10,000 average homes in the region annually. The towers are 213 feet (65 m) tall, with 121 feet (37 m) blades. From base to vertically positioned blade tip, they will be approximately 334 feet (102 m). The turbines begin generating energy at wind speeds as low as 8 mph (13 km/h), and produce the maximum power output when winds blow above 30 mph (48 km/h). The maximum rotor speed is 20 rpm. The project was built with turbines manufactured at facilities all across the U.S. The power generated is delivered to the New England grid through the local utility National Grid.

=== Environmental impact ===
The Hoosac Wind Power Project offsets approximately 100 million pounds of carbon dioxide per year relative to conventional electricity generation. That is equivalent to the estimated annual emissions produced by 9,400 cars or consuming more than 112,000 barrels of oil.

=== Economic impact ===
Approximately US$257,000 in annual payments in lieu of taxes are made to the host towns (US$135,000 to Florida, $122,000 to Monroe), escalating with inflation, amounting to approximately US$6.8 million over the life of the agreement. In addition, the towns host turbines on town-owned land, which will generate approximately US$3 million in revenue over the life of the project. The project created 3 permanent jobs, 140 temporary construction jobs at peak, and purchase many products and services locally. To date, the project has generated 70,098 local labor hours and nearly US$3.8 million in local spending.

== See also ==
- Wind power in Massachusetts
- Wind energy
