= Williamstown Rail Yard and Station Historic District =

Historic district in Massachusetts, United States

- U.S. National Register of Historic Places
- U.S. Historic district
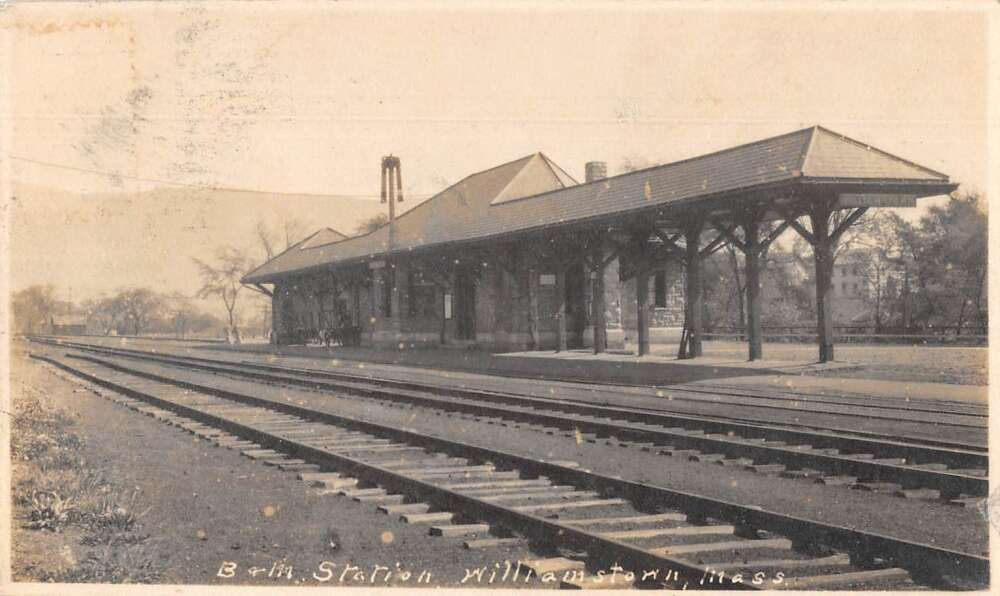
- Williamstown Station

- Location within Massachusetts Location within the United States
- Location: Williamstown, Massachusetts
- Coordinates: 42°43′11″N 73°11′25″W
- Area: 4 acres (1.6 ha)
- Architect: Gifford-Wood Company
- Architectural style: Romanesque
- NRHP reference No.: 94000544
- Added to NRHP: June 3, 1994

Williamstown Rail Yard and Station Historic District is a historic district at the junction of Cole Avenue and N. Hoosac Road in Williamstown, Massachusetts.The rail yard was an important junction point for the railroads of the area in the late 19th century, serving as the western terminus for trains passing through the Hoosac Tunnel to points east. The yard's facilities included a locomotive repair shop and a railroad roundhouse, although the latter has not survived. The district was listed the National Register of Historic Places in 1994.

== Description and history ==
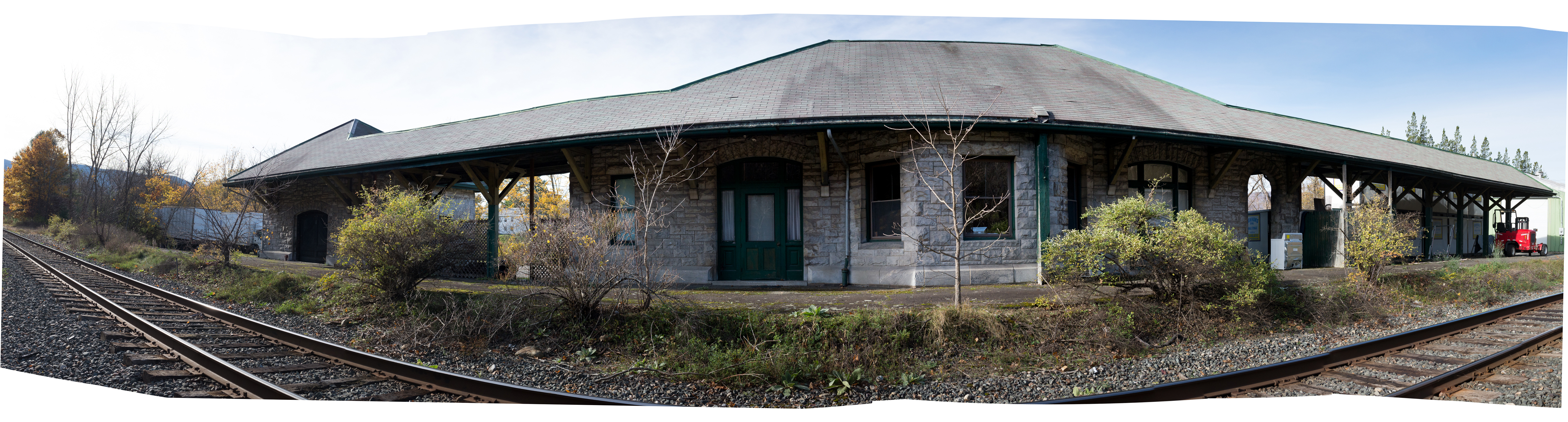
The former station in 2017

The former Williamstown Rail Yard and Station occupy a narrow strip of land along the north bank of the Hoosic River, roughly divided by Cole Avenue, and separated from North Hoosac Road by the railroad right-of-way the facilities historically served. The southeastern half of the district is where the former passenger station is located, while the northwestern half houses a few surviving elements of the railroad maintenance yard. The passenger station was built in 1898 to replace an earlier wood frame station (built 1859) that was destroyed by fire. The new station was built of stone, and features Richardsonian Romanesque details. Passenger service was discontinued by the Boston & Maine Railroad in 1959. The surviving railyard facilities include coal storage elevators, built between 1914 and 1931 for use by local coal delivery services, and the 1879 freight house, at the very northern end of the district.

Railroad service to Williamstown was inaugurated in 1859, and was instrumental in transforming the town, bringing industrial development. Early service ran between Pittsfield, Massachusetts and Albany, New York, and this was augmented by the completion of the Hoosac Tunnel to also provide faster service to Boston. The Fitchburg Railroad took over all three lines in 1887, and used this yard as a staging ground for helper locomotives on the traversal of the Hoosac Tunnel, and as a sorting yard to separate eastbound traffic bound either for the tunnel or Pittsfield. The yard had sixteen sidings, a nine-bay roundhouse, and a turntable; the latter two features do not survive in recognizable form, and their site is located outside the historic district. The service features of the yard fell out of use after the Hoosac Tunnel was electrified in 1911. The 1879 freight house was closed in 1939, its functions relocated to the passenger station. Passenger service ended at the end of 1958, and the freight station was closed the following year.

== See also ==
- National Register of Historic Places listings in Berkshire County, Massachusetts
