= AQW =

AQW may refer to:

- AdventureQuest Worlds, a browser-based massively multiplayer online role-playing game released by Artix Entertainment
- AQW, the FAA LID code for Harriman-and-West Airport, North Adams, Massachusetts
