= Savoy, Massachusetts =

- Town
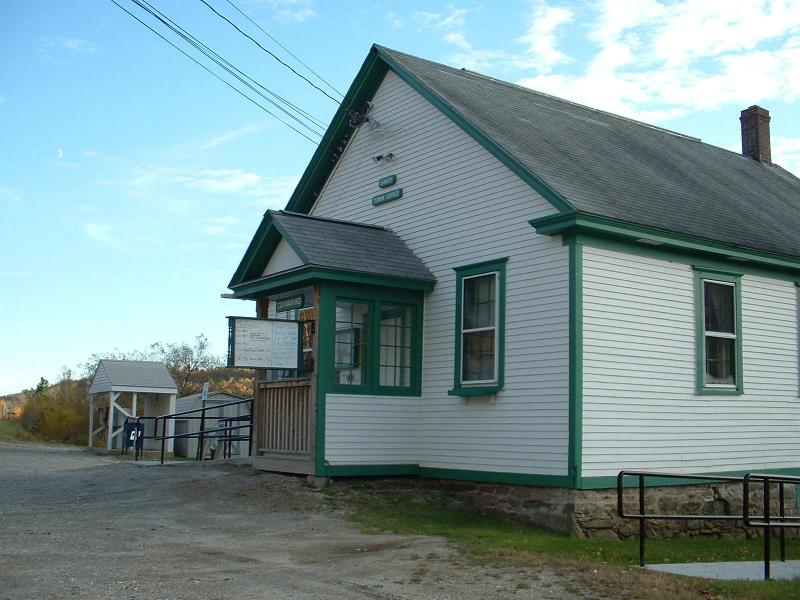
- Savoy Town Hall

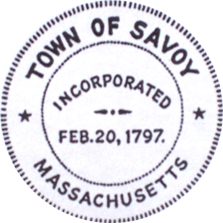
- Seal

- Location in Berkshire County and the state of Massachusetts.
- Coordinates: 42°34′00″N 73°01′45″W
- Country: United States
- State: Massachusetts
- County: Berkshire
- Settled: 1777
- Incorporated: 1797

Government
  - Type: Open town meeting

Area
  - Total: 36.0 sq mi (93.3 km^{2})
  - Land: 35.8 sq mi (92.8 km^{2})
  - Water: 0.19 sq mi (0.5 km^{2})
- Elevation: 1,719 ft (524 m)

Population (2020)
  - Total: 645
  - Density: 18.0/sq mi (6.95/km^{2})
- Time zone: UTC-5 (Eastern)
  - Summer (DST): UTC-4 (Eastern)
- ZIP code: 01256
- Area code: 413
- FIPS code: 25-60225
- GNIS feature ID: 0619427
- Website: Town of Savoy

Savoy is a town in Berkshire County, Massachusetts, United States. It is part of the Pittsfield, Massachusetts Metropolitan Statistical Area. The population was 645 at the 2020 census.

== History ==
Savoy began its existence within the Massachusetts Colony as part of "Northern Berkshire Township #6", which included the present-day towns of Adams, North Adams, Cheshire and Lanesborough. The land was auctioned off several times before it was finally purchased by Colonel William Bullock of Rehoboth.

Savoy, or "New Seconk" as it was originally called by its inhabitants, was first settled in 1777 by a group led by Colonel Lemuel Hathaway. The town was officially incorporated in 1797, and was supposedly named for the land's resemblance to the Duchy of Savoy in France. The town started off with a grazing agrarian industry, before several lumber mills took off in town. The town was very diverse religiously, with several faiths practicing by the mid-19th century. Today the town is mostly a quiet rural community, known for its scenery and natural beauty.

== Geography ==
According to the United States Census Bureau, the town has a total area of 36.0 square miles (93.3 km^{2}), of which 35.8 square miles (92.8 km^{2}) is land and 0.19 square miles (0.5 km^{2}), or 0.48%, is water. The town is the 45th largest town by area in the state, and ninth largest in the county. Savoy is located among the Berkshire Mountains, with much of the town being dominated by Savoy Mountain State Forest, as well as parts of three other state forests (Mohawk Trail State Forest, Windsor State Forest and Kenneth Dubuque Memorial State Forest), and a wildlife management area in the southwest corner of town. The Cold River, a branch of the Deerfield River, forms part of the town's northern border, and feeds several brooks. Several tributaries of the Westfield River also flow through the southern portion of town. The highest point in town is the summit of Borden Mountain, at 2,507 feet (764 m) above sea level.

Savoy is located along the eastern border of Berkshire County, and shares a border with Franklin County and Hampshire County. The town is bordered by Florida to the north, Charlemont, Hawley and Plainfield to the east, Windsor to the south, Cheshire to the southwest, and Adams to the west. Charlemont and Hawley are both located in Franklin County, and Plainfield is in Hampshire County. Savoy is 17 miles (27 km) northeast of Pittsfield, 49 miles (79 km) northwest of Springfield and approximately 120 miles (190 km) west by northwest of Boston (although it is closer to both Hartford and Albany than its own state capital).

A short portion of Massachusetts Route 2, also known as the Mohawk Trail, crosses along the northeast border of town before crossing the Cold River into Florida. In the south, Route 116 (coming from Adams in the west) and Route 8A (coming from Windsor in the south) meet near the center of town and continue as one road towards the southeast corner of town.

There are no railroad lines through the town, the nearest being the freight line which passes through the neighboring town of Florida via the Hoosac Tunnel. The nearest regional bus service can be found in North Adams, as can Harriman-and-West Airport, the nearest small airport. The town is roughly equidistantly located between the nearest airports with national service, Bradley International Airport in Connecticut and Albany International Airport in New York.

== Demographics ==
Historical population
Year	Pop.	±%
1850	955	—
1860	904	−5.3%
1870	861	−4.8%
1880	715	−17.0%
1890	569	−20.4%
1900	506	−11.1%
1910	503	−0.6%
1920	436	−13.3%
1930	307	−29.6%
1940	300	−2.3%
1950	291	−3.0%
1960	277	−4.8%
1970	322	+16.2%
1980	644	+100.0%
1990	634	−1.6%
2000	705	+11.2%
2010	692	−1.8%
2020	645	−6.8%
2024*	655	+1.6%
* = population estimate. Source: United States census records and Population Estimates Program data.

As of the census of 2000, there were 705 people, 287 households, and 202 families residing in the town. By population, Savoy ranks 26th out of the 32 towns in Berkshire County, and 336th out of the 351 Massachusetts cities and towns. The population density was 19.7 people per square mile (7.6/km^{2}), ranking it 27th in the county, and 11th least densely populated in the Commonwealth. There were 326 housing units at an average density of 9.1 per square mile (3.5/km^{2}). The racial makeup of the town was 97.45% White, 0.71% African American, 0.43% Native American, 0.28% from other races, and 1.13% from two or more races. Hispanic or Latino of any race were 0.71% of the population.

There were 287 households, out of which 31.0% had children under the age of 18 living with them, 60.3% were married couples living together, 5.6% had a female householder with no husband present, and 29.6% were non-families. 23.3% of all households were made up of individuals, and 7.0% had someone living alone who was 65 years of age or older. The average household size was 2.45 and the average family size was 2.90.

In the town, the population was spread out, with 24.4% under the age of 18, 5.4% from 18 to 24, 30.5% from 25 to 44, 29.5% from 45 to 64, and 10.2% who were 65 years of age or older. The median age was 40 years. For every 100 females, there were 115.6 males. For every 100 females age 18 and over, there were 107.4 males.

The median income for a household in the town was $41,477, and the median income for a family was $50,114. Males had a median income of $36,500 versus $28,182 for females. The per capita income for the town was $20,223. About 4.9% of families and 5.4% of the population were below the poverty line, including 9.2% of those under age 18 and 3.7% of those age 65 or over.

== Government ==
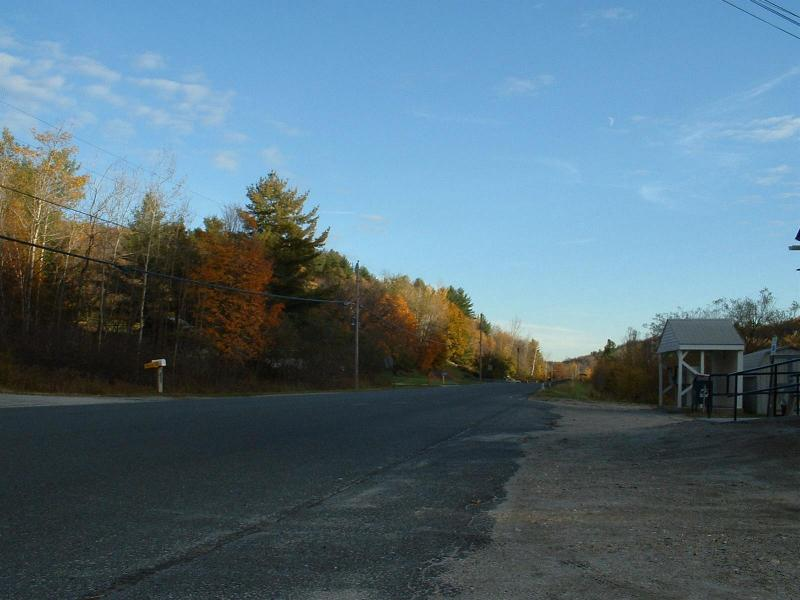
A view down Route 116

Savoy employs the open town meeting form of government, and is led by a board of selectmen. The town has its own services, including fire, police and public works. The town runs the Savoy Hollow Library, which is connected to the regional library network, but is only open three days a week.

On the state level, Savoy is represented in the Massachusetts House of Representatives by the Second Berkshire district, represented by Paul Mark, which covers central Berkshire County, as well as portions of Hampshire and Franklin counties. In the Massachusetts Senate, the town is represented by the Berkshire, Hampshire and Franklin district, represented by Ben Downing, which includes all of Berkshire County and western Hampshire and Franklin counties. The town is patrolled by the Fourth (Cheshire) Station of Barracks "B" of the Massachusetts State Police.

On the national level, Savoy is represented in the United States House of Representatives as part of Massachusetts's 1st congressional district, and is represented by Richard Neal. Massachusetts is currently represented in the United States Senate by senior Senator Elizabeth Warren and junior senator Ed Markey.

Savoy presidential election results
Year	Democratic	Republican	Third parties	Total Votes	Margin
2024	48.74% 213	48.28% 211	2.97% 13	437	0.46%
2020	56.64% 226	40.35% 161	3.01% 12	399	16.29%
2016	47.92% 184	42.45% 163	9.64% 37	384	5.47%
2012	67.70% 241	28.93% 103	3.37% 12	356	38.76%
2008	68.16% 274	27.61% 111	4.23% 17	402	40.55%
2004	65.98% 225	32.84% 112	1.17% 4	341	33.14%
2000	48.79% 141	42.56% 123	8.65% 25	289	6.23%
1996	51.13% 159	24.76% 77	24.12% 75	311	26.37%
1992	34.16% 96	27.76% 78	38.08% 107	281	3.91%
1988	41.91% 101	57.26% 138	0.83% 2	241	15.35%
1984	33.94% 74	65.60% 143	0.46% 1	218	31.65%
1980	36.73% 83	53.10% 120	10.18% 23	226	16.37%
1976	54.90% 112	42.16% 86	2.94% 6	204	12.75%
1972	48.37% 89	51.63% 95	0.00% 0	184	3.26%
1968	47.20% 76	45.96% 74	6.83% 11	161	1.24%
1964	65.03% 93	34.97% 50	0.00% 0	143	30.07%
1960	36.54% 57	62.82% 98	0.64% 1	156	26.28%
1956	26.17% 39	73.15% 109	0.67% 1	149	46.98%
1952	29.73% 44	70.27% 104	0.00% 0	148	40.54%
1948	43.38% 59	53.68% 73	2.94% 4	136	10.29%
1944	48.12% 64	51.13% 68	0.75% 1	133	3.01%
1940	40.29% 56	59.71% 83	0.00% 0	139	19.42%

== Education ==
Savoy operates its own elementary school, the Emma L. Miller Memorial Elementary School, which serves students from pre-kindergarten through sixth grade. Savoy is part of the Northern Berkshire School Union. Students then attend Hoosac Valley Regional Middle School, and Hoosac Valley High School. There are also private, parochial, charter and vocational schools located in nearby Adams and North Adams.

The nearest community college is Berkshire Community College in Pittsfield. The nearest state college is Massachusetts College of Liberal Arts in North Adams, the nearest state university is the University of Massachusetts Amherst, and the nearest private college is Williams College in Williamstown.
