= Clarksburg State Park =

State park in Massachusetts, United States

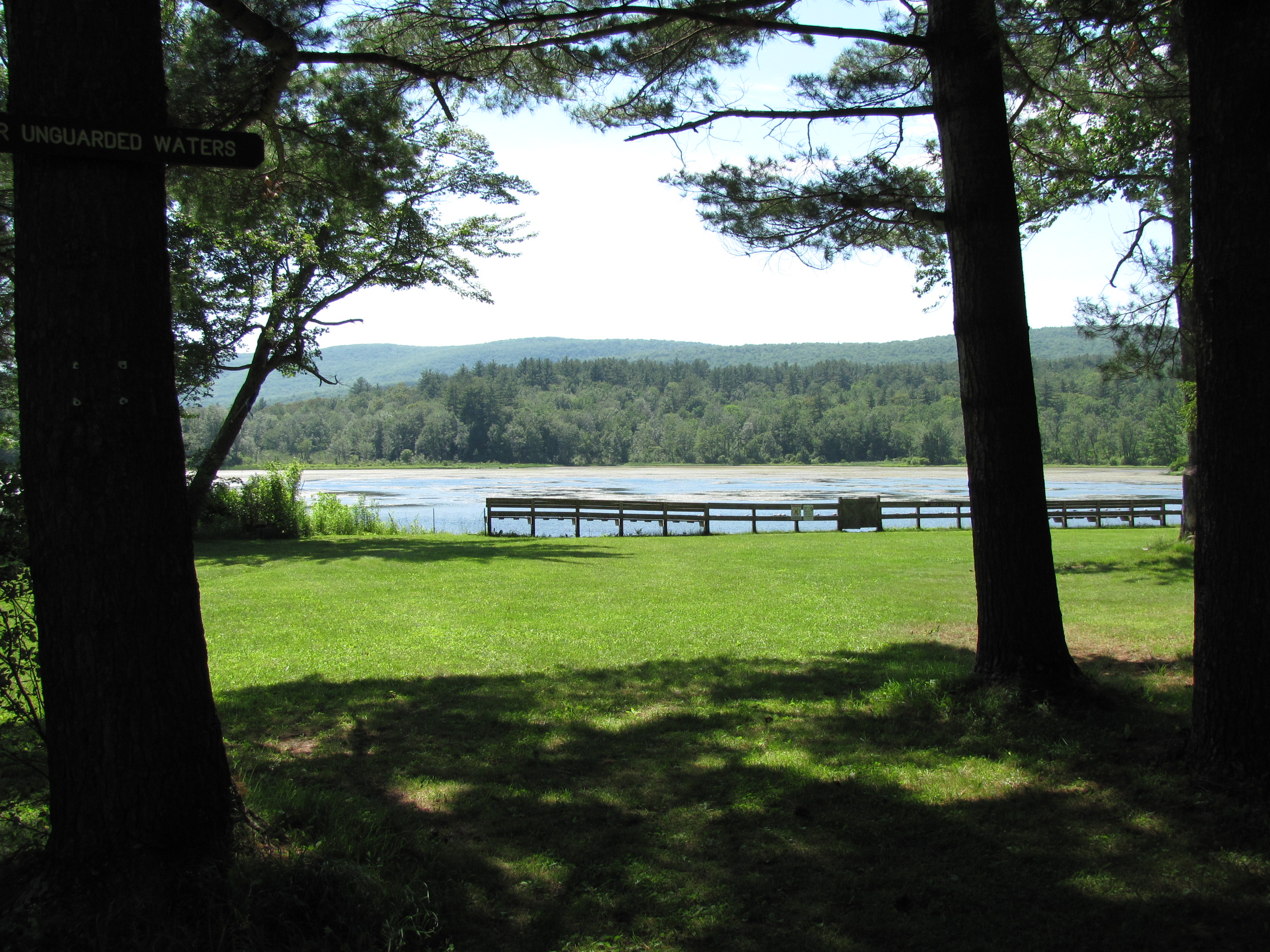
- Mauserts Pond

- Location within Massachusetts Location within the United States
- Interactive map of Clarksburg State Park
- Location: Clarksburg, Massachusetts, United States
- Coordinates: 42°44′12″N 73°04′45″W
- Area: 368 acres (149 ha)
- Elevation: 1,073 ft (327 m)
- Established: 1954
- Administrator: Massachusetts Department of Conservation and Recreation
- Website: Official website

Clarksburg State Park is a 368-acre (149 ha) Massachusetts state park located in the town of Clarksburg. The park is made up of unspoiled northern hardwood forest, with views of the Hoosac Range, Mount Greylock and the Green Mountains. It is managed by the Department of Conservation and Recreation.

== Activities and amenities ==
Mauserts Pond has a pavilion and landscaped picnic area. The pond, though weedy, offers opportunities for swimming, fishing, canoeing and kayaking. The park has 4.5 miles (7.2 km) of trails including the 3-mile (4.8 km) Pond Loop Trail for hiking and cross-country skiing. It also has a 46-site campground.
