= Savoy Mountain State Forest =

Protected area in Massachusetts, United States

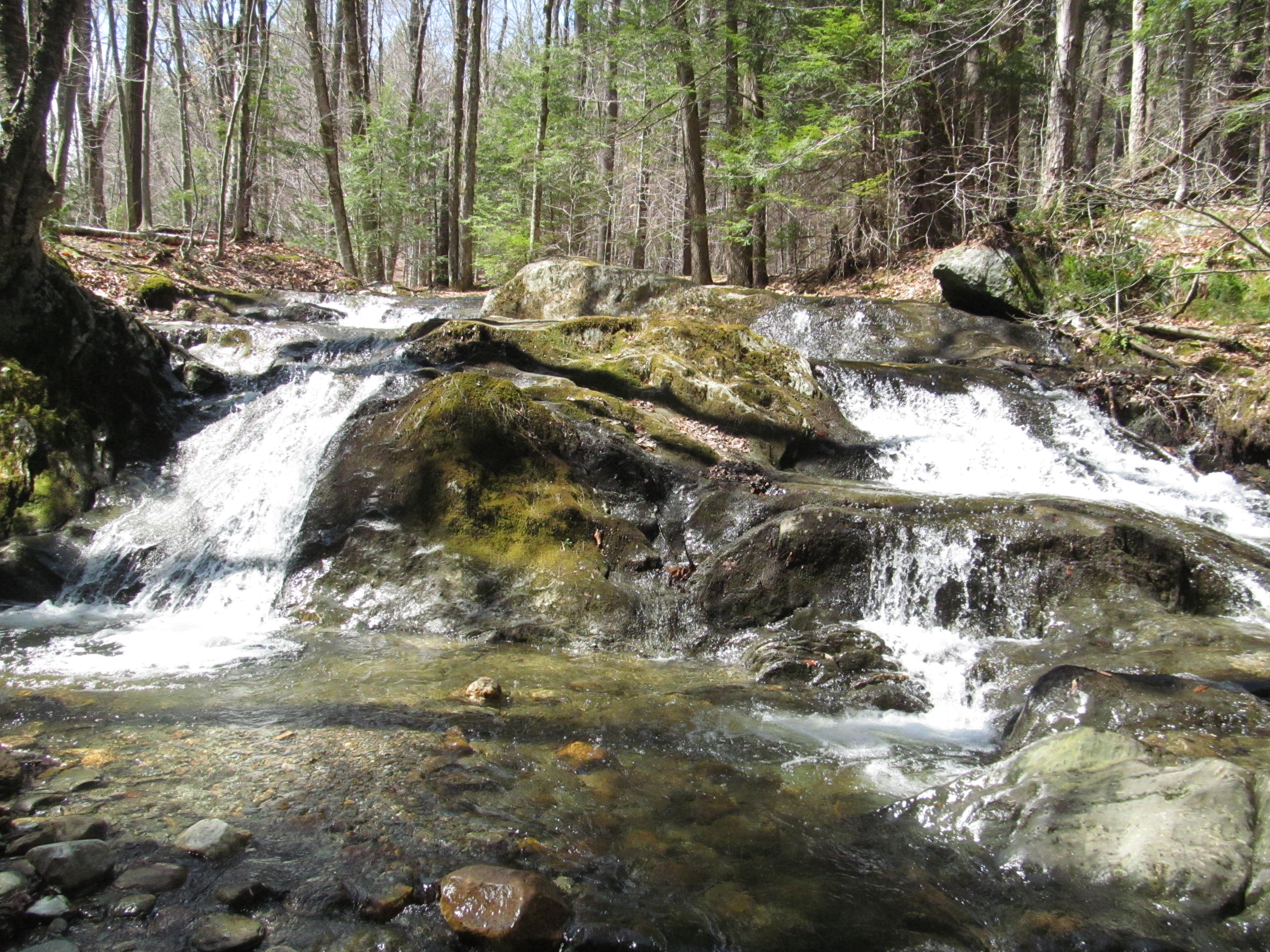

- Location within Massachusetts Location within the United States
- Location: Savoy and Florida, Massachusetts, United States
- Coordinates: 42°37′28″N 73°00′12″W
- Area: 10,457 acres (4,232 ha)
- Elevation: 1,358 ft (414 m)
- Established: 1918
- Administrator: Massachusetts Department of Conservation and Recreation
- Website: Official website

Savoy Mountain State Forest is a Massachusetts state forest located primarily in the towns of Savoy and Florida, with portions extending into neighboring Adams and North Adams. Situated along the Hoosac Mountain Range, it features four ponds (North, South, Bog, and Burnett), and seven hill and mountain summits, including Lewis Hill (2177 ft), Flat Rock Hill (2195 ft), Spruce Hill (2566 ft), and Borden Mountain (2505 ft). Also within the forest are at least two notable waterfalls, Parker Brook Falls and Tannery Falls, the latter of which is a 100-foot (30 m) drop. The forest is managed by the Department of Conservation and Recreation.

== History ==
Savoy Mountain State Forest was created when the state purchased 100 acres (40 ha) of abandoned farmland in 1918. Much of the land was reforested with Norway and blue spruce by the Civilian Conservation Corps in the 1930s. The CCC also built concrete dams at Bog, Burnett and Tannery ponds, replacing older dams.

A total of 120 acres (49 ha) of old growth forest have been identified in the state forest near the Cold River and Tannery Falls. Trees in the old growth include eastern hemlock, red spruce, yellow birch, and sugar maple. They range from 150 to 400 years in age.

== Activities and amenities ==
North Pond and South Pond offer swimming, showers, restrooms, picnicking, and a boat ramp for non-motorized boating. Bog Pond also has a canoe launch. The forest has 45 campsites and four log cabins available for rental. Trails are available for hiking, mountain biking, birding, and cross-country skiing. The forest also has interpretive programs, fishing, and restricted hunting.
