= Bakke Mountain =

Mountain in Massachusetts, US

- Location within Massachusetts

Highest point
- Elevation: 2,556 ft (779 m)
- Listing: List of mountains in Massachusetts
- Coordinates: 42°44′11″N 73°01′57″W

Geography
- Location: Berkshire County, Massachusetts, U.S.
- Topo map: USGS North Adams

Bakke Mountain is a summit located in the town of Florida, Massachusetts. It was named for Master Sergeant Roald Bakke, who died in the collapse of Texas Tower 4. The mountain is the scene of wildlife and forest conservation efforts and serves as one of the primary sites of the Hoosac Wind Project. The Bakke Mountain Wind Farm is an alternative energy wind plant located on the mountain.

== Forest and Wildlife Management ==
Part of the Bakke Mountain property, which in total covers between 700 and 750 acres (3.0 km^{2}), was at one point a turnip farm owned by the Tower family. When the property was first purchased by the Bakke family in the 1960s, the fields and meadows lined with rock walls used for small livestock grazing were still open and free of tree growth. As time went on and the fields went unused, low brush sprang up, followed by saplings, which by 2000 had become a full-fledged forest.
