= Monroe State Forest =

State forest in northwestern Massachusetts

- Location within Massachusetts Location within the United States
- Location: Monroe and Florida, Massachusetts, United States
- Coordinates: 42°42′18″N 73°00′20″W
- Area: 3,750 acres (1,520 ha)
- Elevation: 2,717 ft (828 m)
- Established: 1924
- Administrator: Massachusetts Department of Conservation and Recreation
- Website: Official website

Monroe State Forest is a Massachusetts state forest with recreational features located in the towns of Monroe and Florida. A small portion of the borders the state of Vermont. The forest is managed by the Department of Conservation and Recreation.

== History ==
The majority of land was once farmland. 19th-century cellar holes and stone walls can be found throughout the area. The state forest was established in 1924. Workers with the Civilian Conservation Corps were active here in the 1930s. Their contributions included the construction of the Raycroft Lookout, a stone platform offering dramatic vistas of the Deerfield River.

== Natural features ==
The forest's rugged terrain of steep mountains and deep valleys include Spruce Mountain as well as Dunbar Brook, which drops 700 vertical feet in two miles, cascading over boulders and forming countless waterfalls, rapids and pools.

=== Old growth forest ===
Researchers have identified 273 acres (110 ha) of old-growth forest sites in the park. Species represented include eastern hemlock, Eastern White Pine, red spruce, and hardwoods such as yellow birch, sweet birch, American beech, American basswood, and white ash.

== Activities and amenities ==
The forest has trails for hiking, horseback riding and cross-country skiing. Fishing and restricted hunting are permitted. Scenic views of the Hoosac Range, Green Mountains and Deerfield River can be found at the Raycroft Lookout, a stone platform reached by ascending a steep path.
