= Florida, Massachusetts =

- Town
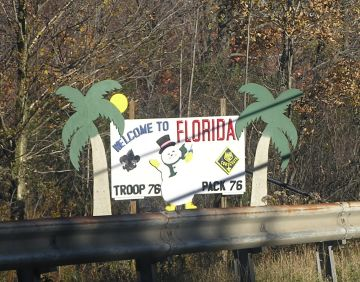
- Welcome sign along the Mohawk Trail

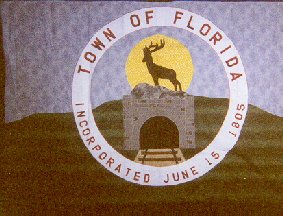
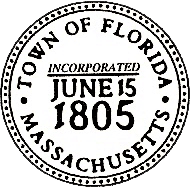
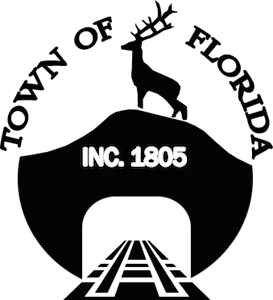
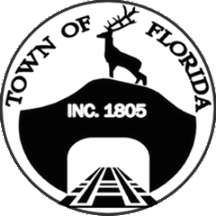
- Flag Seal Coat of arms Logo

- Location in Berkshire County and Massachusetts.
- Coordinates: 42°40′00″N 73°00′42″W
- Country: United States
- State: Massachusetts
- County: Berkshire
- Settled: 1783
- Incorporated: 1805

Government
  - Type: Open town meeting

Area
  - Total: 24.6 sq mi (63.7 km^{2})
  - Land: 24.4 sq mi (63.1 km^{2})
  - Water: 0.23 sq mi (0.6 km^{2})
- Elevation: 1,896 ft (578 m)

Population (2020)
  - Total: 694
  - Density: 28.5/sq mi (11.0/km^{2})
- Time zone: UTC-5 (Eastern)
  - Summer (DST): UTC-4 (Eastern)
- ZIP Codes: 01247 (Florida); 01343 (Drury)
- Area code: 413
- FIPS code: 25-24120
- GNIS feature ID: 0619419
- Website: townofflorida.org

Florida is a town in Berkshire County, Massachusetts, United States. It is part of the Pittsfield, Massachusetts Metropolitan Statistical Area. It is home to the east portal of the Hoosac Tunnel, as well as Whitcomb Summit (elevation 2,172 ft or 662 m), the highest point of the Mohawk Trail. Florida contains the village of Drury. At the 2020 census the town had a total population of 694.

== History ==
The area was first settled by Europeans as part of the Equivalent Lands (specifically, the "Berkshire Equivalent"). Most of what is now the town of Florida, Massachusetts was originally a grant to the town of Bernardston, Massachusetts made sometime before 1771. The first settler, Dr. Daniel Nelson, arrived around 1783. The town was incorporated in 1805. It has been speculated that it was named "Florida" because Spanish Florida was a topic of conversation at the time of its founding.

The town was mostly agrarian, with maple syrup, wool, and potatoes its main products for many years. However, in the mid-nineteenth century, the town was a boom town for the workers involved in the construction of the Hoosac Tunnel, a rail tunnel which begins on the town's eastern border and extends through the Hoosac Range to neighboring North Adams.

Nathaniel Hawthorne, in his American Notebooks, names the town as Lebrida, not Florida, and speaks of the Hoosac Range as "the Green Mountain" in the singular. It is possible that the name Lebrida was a corruption of Florida; or the other way around. While the reference to "the Green Mountain" evidently reflects local tradition of the time (1838), and may in fact be what gave the name Green Mountains to the entire range, as another mountain in Vermont also bears the name Green Mountain.

Today, the town is sparsely populated, with most residents working in neighboring towns. In 2012, the Hoosac Wind Power Project was constructed in Florida and the neighboring town of Monroe.

== Geography ==
According to the United States Census Bureau, the town has a total area of 24.6 square miles (63.7 km^{2}), of which 24.4 square miles (63.1 km^{2}) is land and 0.23 square miles (0.6 km^{2}), or 0.93%, is water.

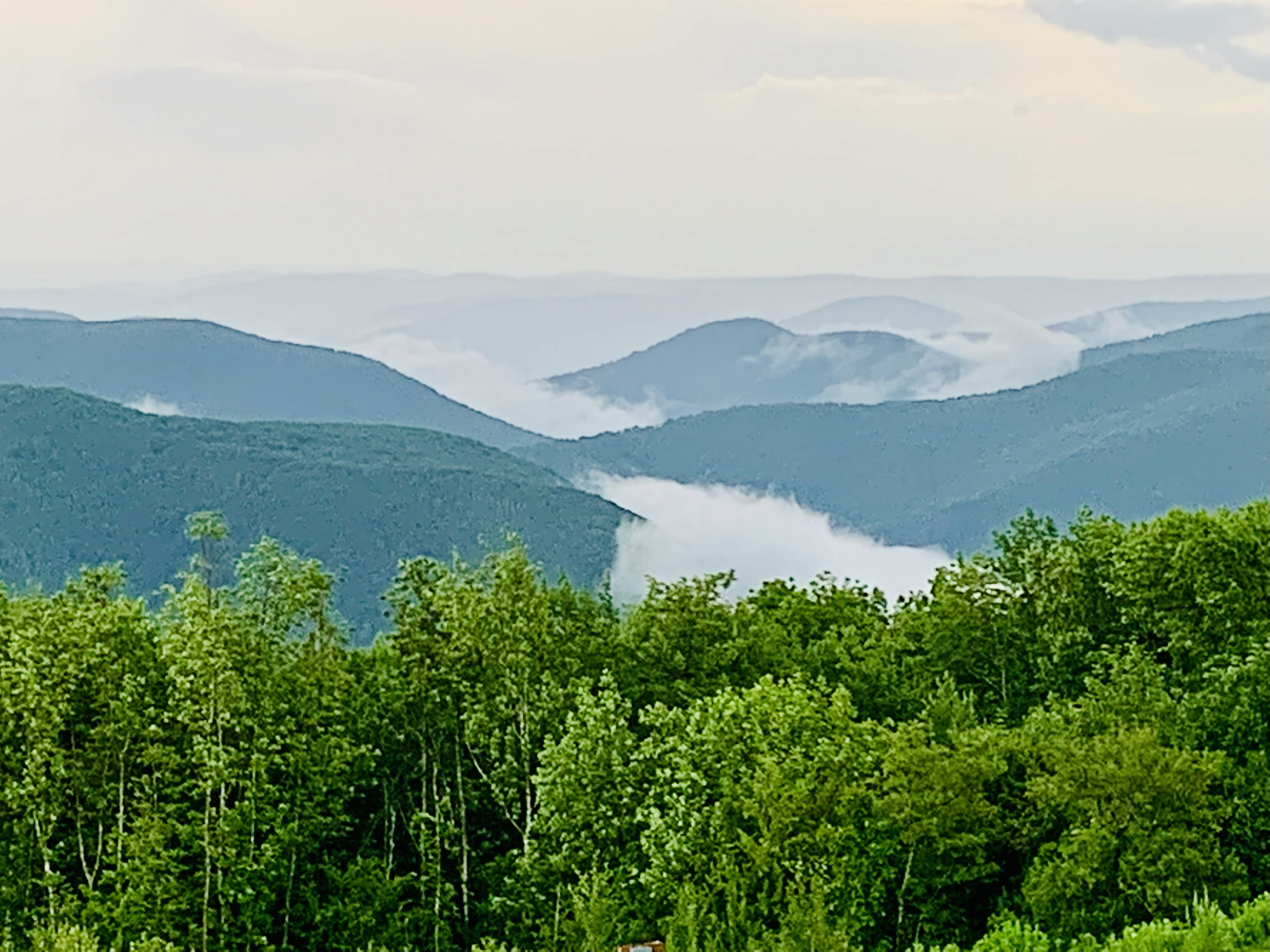
View from Whitcomb Summit

Florida is located at 42° 39'57.77"N, 72° 56'29.38"W. It is bordered on the north by Stamford, Vermont, on the northeast by Monroe, on the east by Rowe, on the southeast by Charlemont, on the south by Savoy, on the southwest by Adams, and on the west by North Adams and Clarksburg. The town's population is mostly concentrated along the Mohawk Trail, which runs through the town, and its villages, Drury, Florida and Whitcomb Summit.

Florida is located near the highest points of the Hoosac Range, which runs through the western part of town. There are several rivers and brooks, most of which lead to the Deerfield River, which forms much of the eastern border and flows to the Connecticut River. The town includes parts of three state forests - Monroe State Forest in the northeast, Savoy Mountain State Forest in the south, and Mohawk Trail State Forest in the southeast. The highest elevation in the town is 2,830 feet (860 m) above sea level, on an unnamed hill northwest of Crum Hill in the neighboring town of Monroe.

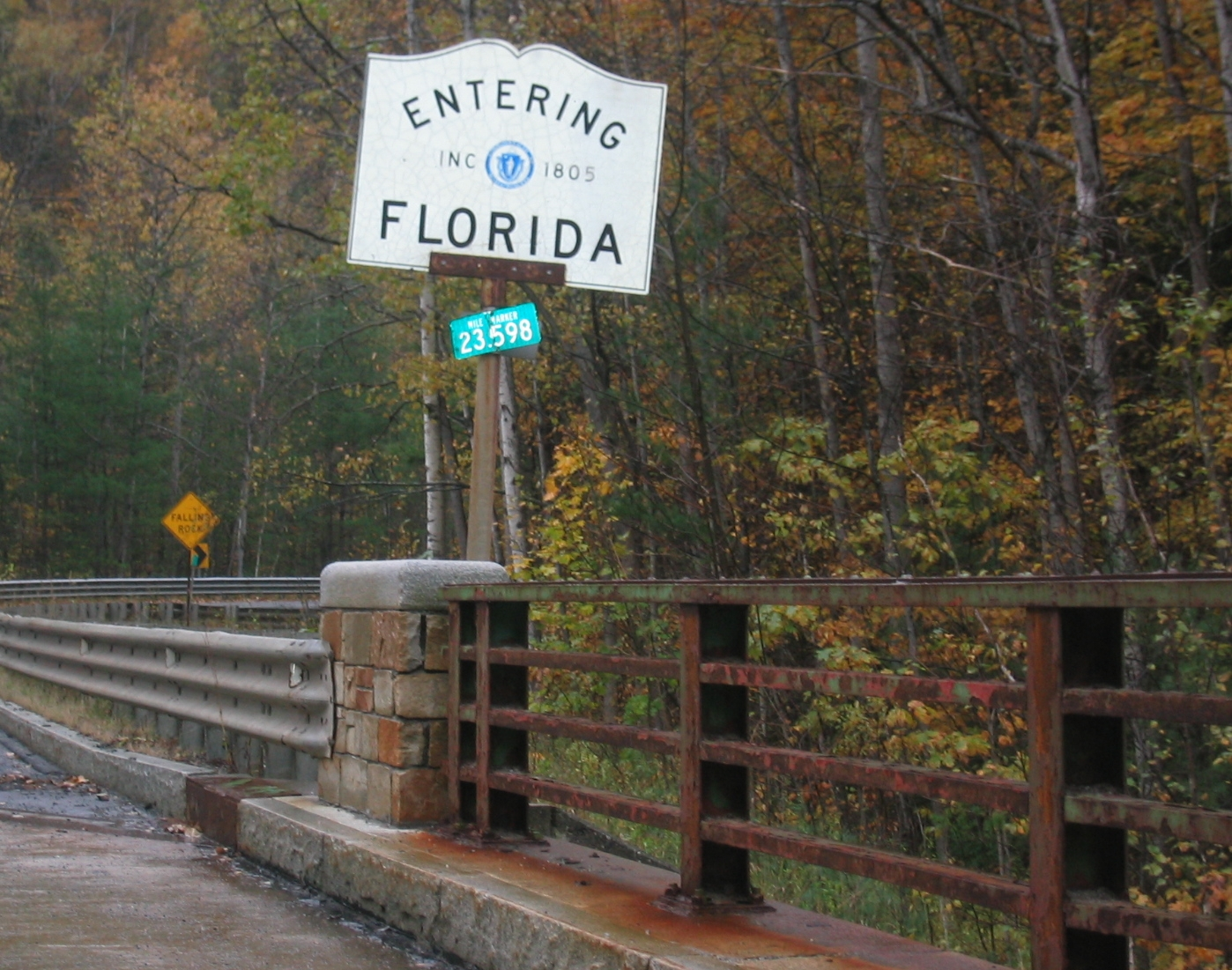
The official town line marker as seen from Route 2

Massachusetts Route 2, the Mohawk Trail, runs from the southeast of town northwest across the center of town, passing over Whitcomb Summit, the highest point along the trail. At Whitcomb Summit there is a monument to the Elks Club, whose members helped modernize the trails and worked on the Hoosac Tunnel. Whitcomb Summit is known for sensational views of the surrounding valleys. Just west of the town line is the West Summit, which has views of the Hoosic River valley and the Taconic Range further west. There are no other state routes through town, and the nearest interstate highway is Interstate 91 to the east.

The 4.75-mile-long (7.64 km) Hoosac Tunnel carries the railway under the town, and as such has no stops in town. The nearest regional bus service can be found in North Adams, as can the nearest regional airport, Harriman-and-West Airport. The nearest airport with national flights is Albany International Airport.

== Demographics ==
Historical population
Year	Pop.	±%
1850	561	—
1860	645	+15.0%
1870	1,322	+105.0%
1880	459	−65.3%
1890	436	−5.0%
1900	390	−10.6%
1910	395	+1.3%
1920	298	−24.6%
1930	307	+3.0%
1940	421	+37.1%
1950	479	+13.8%
1960	569	+18.8%
1970	672	+18.1%
1980	730	+8.6%
1990	742	+1.6%
2000	676	−8.9%
2010	752	+11.2%
2020	694	−7.7%
2024*	673	−3.0%
* = population estimate. Source: United States census records and Population Estimates Program data.

As of the census of 2000, there were 676 people, 265 households, and 196 families residing in the town. Florida's population ranks 27th out of the 32 towns in Berkshire County, and 337th out of the 351 cities and towns in Massachusetts. The population density was 27.7 inhabitants per square mile (10.7/km^{2}), making it the 24th most densely populated town in the county, and 333rd in the Commonwealth. There were 294 housing units at an average density of 12.1 per square mile (4.7/km^{2}). The racial makeup of the town was 97.49% White, 0.59% African American, 0.44% Native American, 0.44% Asian, 0.30% from other races, and 0.74% from two or more races. Hispanic or Latino of any race were 0.44% of the population.

There were 265 households, out of which 32.8% had children under the age of 18 living with them, 65.7% were married couples living together, 4.9% had a female householder with no husband present, and 25.7% were non-families. 22.6% of all households were made up of individuals, and 9.8% had someone living alone who was 65 years of age or older. The average household size was 2.55 and the average family size was 2.99.

In the town, the population was spread out, with 25.1% under the age of 18, 4.3% from 18 to 24, 30.8% from 25 to 44, 25.9% from 45 to 64, and 13.9% who were 65 years of age or older. The median age was 40 years. For every 100 females, there were 109.3 males. For every 100 females age 18 and over, there were 107.4 males.

The median income for a household in the town was $43,000, and the median income for a family was $52,500. Males had a median income of $32,000 versus $23,906 for females. The per capita income for the town was $16,979. About 3.3% of families and 5.8% of the population were below the poverty line, including 7.3% of those under age 18 and 8.6% of those age 65 or over.

== Government ==
"The Elk on the Trail" statue, Whitcomb Summit

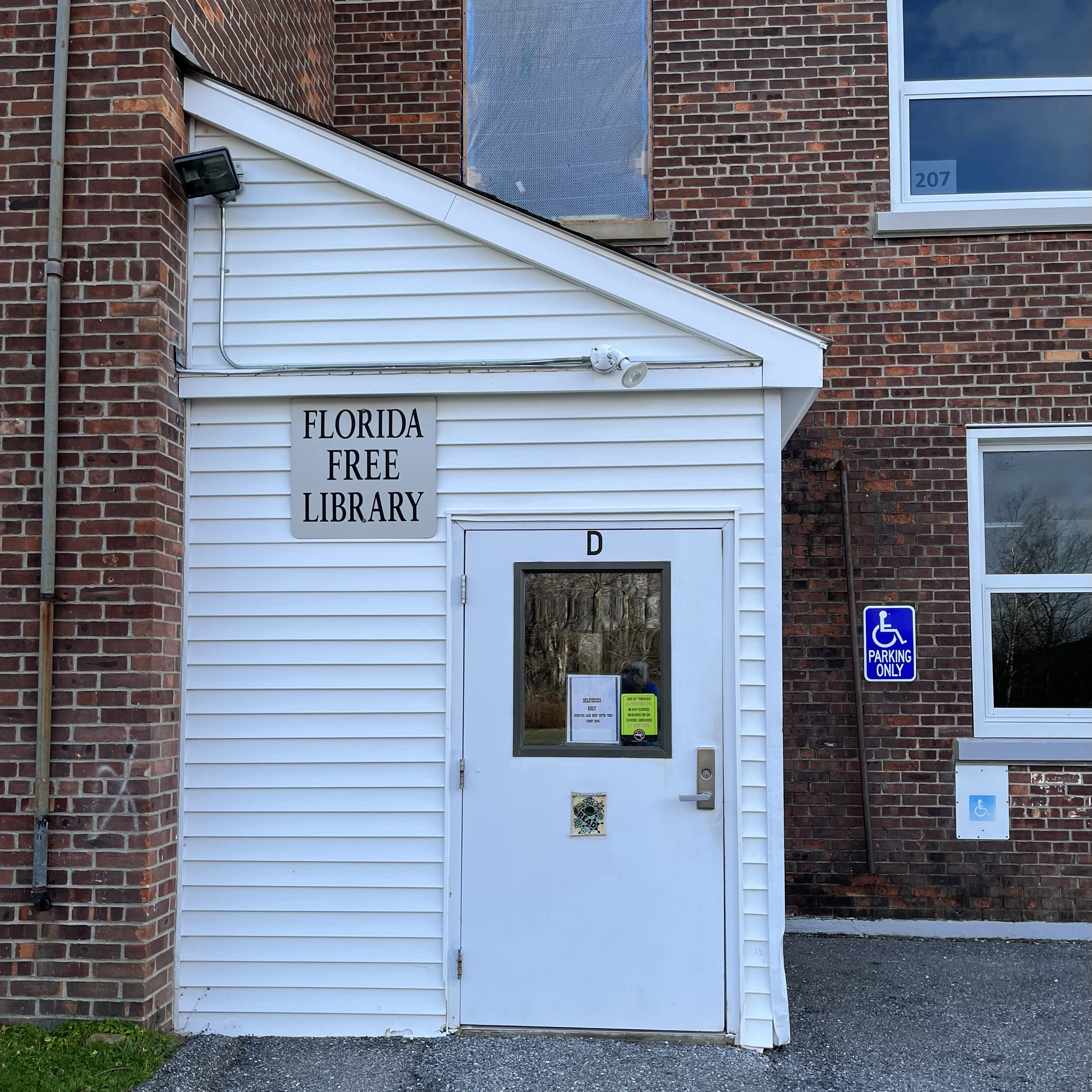
Florida Free Library

Florida is governed by an open town meeting form of government, which is led by a board of selectmen and a town secretary. The town has its own services, including fire and public works, as well as the Florida Free Library, a small library with association to the regional library services. The nearest hospital was North Adams Regional Hospital until its bankruptcy in March 2014. Since May 2014, Berkshire Medical Center has operated an emergency room and other health services at the old NARH location.

On the state level, Florida is represented in the Massachusetts House of Representatives by the First Berkshire district, which covers northern Berkshire County, as well as portions of Franklin County. In the Massachusetts Senate, the town is represented by the Berkshire, Hampshire and Franklin district, which includes all of Berkshire County and western Hampshire and Franklin counties. The town's police services are provided by the Fourth (Cheshire) Station of Troop B of the Massachusetts State Police.

On the national level, Florida is represented in the United States House of Representatives as part of Massachusetts's 1st congressional district, and is represented by Richard Neal of Springfield. Massachusetts is currently represented in the United States Senate by senior Senator Elizabeth Warren and junior Senator Ed Markey.

== Education ==
Florida has one school, the Gabriel Abbott Memorial School, which serves students from kindergarten through eighth grade. The school also serves the students of neighboring Monroe. The town sends its high school students to either Drury High School or Charles H. McCann Technical High School, both of which are in North Adams.

The nearest community college is Berkshire Community College, located in Pittsfield. The nearest public college is the Massachusetts College of Liberal Arts in neighboring North Adams, and the nearest university is the University of Massachusetts Amherst. The nearest private college is Williams College in Williamstown.
