= Borden Mountain =

Mountain in Massachusetts, United States

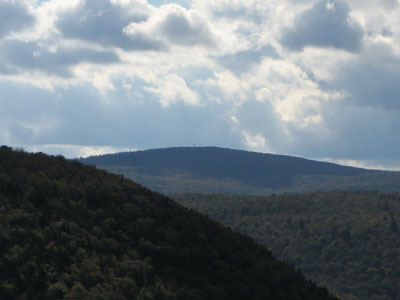
- Borden Mountain as seen from Todd Mountain

Highest point
- Elevation: 2,490 ft (760 m)
- Coordinates: 42°36′04″N 73°01′36″W

Geography
- Location within Massachusetts
- Location: Savoy, Massachusetts, U.S.

Borden Mountain is located in the Savoy Mountain State Forest in Savoy, Massachusetts, USA. The summit features a fire lookout tower.
