= Drury High School =

Coordinates: 42°40′12.64″N 73°05′47.10″W

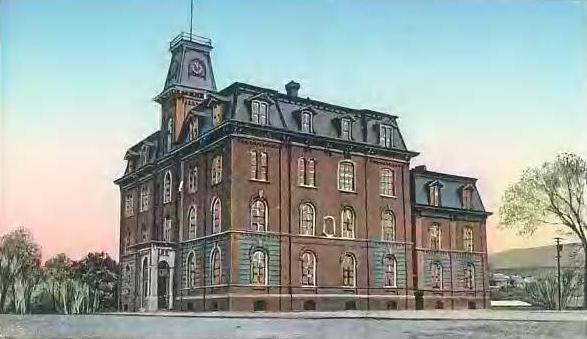
- 1865 school building

Location
- 1130 South Church Street; North Adams, Massachusetts 01247; United States

Information
- Type: Public; Open enrollment
- Established: 1843; 183 years ago
- Status: Open
- School district: North Adams Public Schools
- Superintendent: Tim Callahan
- Principal: Stephanie Kopala
- Staff: 44.38 (FTE)
- Grades: 7–12
- Age: 12 to 18
- Enrollment: 438 (2024-2025)
- Student to teacher ratio: 9.87
- Language: English
- Color: Blue white
- Athletics: Football, baseball, basketball, cheerleading, cross-country, soccer, softball, track, and co-op sports,
- Mascot: Blue Devil
- Newspaper: Devil's Disciple
- Yearbook: Nathanite
- Website: dhs.napsk12.org

Drury High School is a public school in North Adams, Massachusetts, United States. Part of the North Adams Public School District, it serves students in grades 7–12 from North Adams and the towns of Clarksburg, Florida, and Monroe.

== Current standing ==
Drury currently serves grades 7–12.

As of 2014, it had a student body of 459 students. As of 2024 it had a student body of roughly 570 students.

Drury competes primarily within Berkshire County, though a small portion of its non-league independent schedule includes similar-size schools from the Connecticut River Valley of Western Massachusetts and nearby Vermont.

One of two high schools in North Adams, Massachusetts (Charles H. McCann Technical High School).

Their traditional rival is Hoosac Valley High School in Cheshire. However, in the present day, many consider the rival to be McCann Technical High School.

== History ==
Nathan Drury High School was founded in 1843 by a grant of $3,000 left in the will of Nathan Drury, a wealthy farmer of the Town of Florida, Berkshire, Massachusetts. In 1851, it became a free public high school. In 1867, the original school building was torn down. The school moved to 24 Church Street, and a new school was built at that location and remained until 1975, after which the building was repurposed into an elementary school, now remaining in service as of 2024 as Colegrove Park Elementary. The newest building of Nathan Drury High School, known as Drury High School, was built at 1130 Church St., North Adams, in 1975.

The school colors evolved over time, as did the mascot in 1898. The school colors were yellow and white, whereas today they are royal blue and white.

== Notable alumni ==
- Daniel E. Bosley — former member of the Massachusetts House of Representatives
- Gailanne M. Cariddi — former member of the Massachusetts House of Representatives
- Martha Coakley — former Massachusetts Attorney General
- William Evans (1980–2021), class of 1998 – Capitol Police officer killed in the 2021 United States Capitol car attack
- Peter Laird — comic book creator, Teenage Mutant Ninja Turtles
- Frank J. Sprague — inventor
- Jane Swift (born 1965) – class of 1983, former Massachusetts Lieutenant Governor and acting Governor
