= Monroe, Massachusetts =

- Town
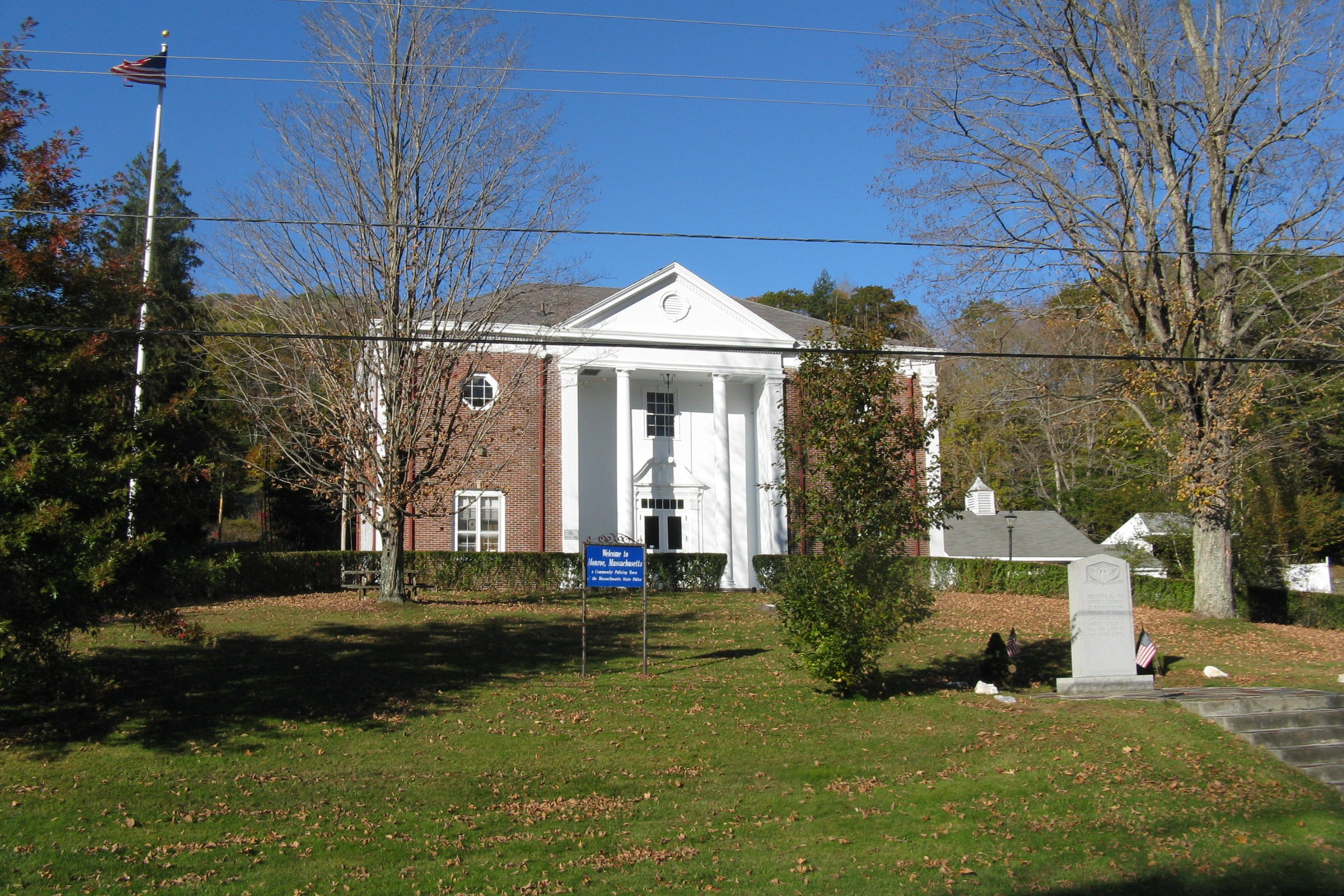
- Monroe Town Hall as seen from Depot Street

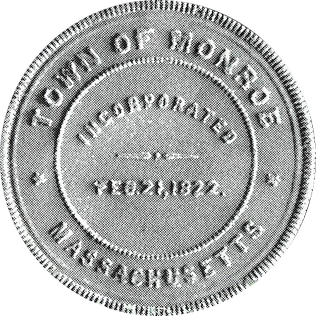
- Seal

- Location in Franklin County in Massachusetts
- Coordinates: 42°43′19″N 72°56′29″W
- Country: United States
- State: Massachusetts
- County: Franklin
- Settled: 1800
- Incorporated: 1822

Government
  - Type: Open town meeting

Area
  - Total: 10.8 sq mi (27.9 km^{2})
  - Land: 10.7 sq mi (27.7 km^{2})
  - Water: 0.077 sq mi (0.2 km^{2})
- Elevation: 1,903 ft (580 m)

Population (2020)
  - Total: 118
  - Density: 11.0/sq mi (4.26/km^{2})
- Time zone: UTC-5 (Eastern)
  - Summer (DST): UTC-4 (Eastern)
- ZIP code: 01350
- Area code: 413
- FIPS code: 25-42040
- GNIS feature ID: 0618170
- Website: n/a

Monroe is a town in Franklin County, Massachusetts, United States. The population was 118 at the 2020 U.S. census. By area, population, and population density, it is the smallest town in the county; and is the second-smallest town by population in the Commonwealth. This makes it the smallest town by population in mainland Massachusetts. Gosnold is the only town in Massachusetts to be smaller than Monroe by population.

Monroe is part of the Springfield, Massachusetts Metropolitan Statistical Area.

== History ==
Monroe was first settled in 1800 and was officially incorporated in 1822. The town was named for President James Monroe, who was in office at the time of incorporation. The town was mostly rural, with dairy farming taking up much of the town's economic activity. During the mid-19th century, the town did get some business from the building of the Hoosac Tunnel, just south of town in Florida. In 1885, however, a railroad line was built between neighboring Readsboro, Vermont, and Holyoke, Massachusetts to haul wood pulp to a paper factory. This, in turn, enticed the Ramage family to establish the James Ramage Paper Company in 1887. The company was the main industry well into the 20th century, before closing in 1984.

== Geography ==
According to the United States Census Bureau, the town has a total area of 10.8 square miles (28 km^{2}), of which 10.7 square miles (28 km^{2}) is land and 0.1 square miles (0.26 km^{2}), or 0.65%, is water. Monroe is located at 42° 43'18.80"N, 72° 56'29.38"W. The town is located on the northwestern corner of Franklin County along the Vermont-Massachusetts state line, and is bordered by Berkshire County to the west and Bennington County, Vermont, to the north. It is bordered on the north by the towns of Stamford, Vermont and Readsboro, Vermont, on the east by Rowe, Massachusetts, and on the south and west by Florida, Massachusetts. Monroe is 26 miles (42 km) northwest of Greenfield, Massachusetts, 55 miles (89 km) north-northwest of Springfield, Massachusetts, and 115 miles (185 km) west-northwest of Boston, Massachusetts.

Monroe is located on the Hoosac Range, the northern end of The Berkshires. Monroe’s eastern town boundaries lies along the Deerfield River where Monroe borders the town of Rowe, which enters the state at this point, heading south and eastward towards the Connecticut River. The river is dammed for part of this length as the southern end of the Sherman Reservoir, which formerly supplied power to the Yankee Rowe Nuclear Power Station. There are also several brooks which run through town. Much of the central and southern part of town is covered by Monroe State Forest, which extends into neighboring town Florida.

Monroe is an isolated town when it comes to road access. There are no highways or Massachusetts state routes that directly go into the town, the nearest state route being Massachusetts Route 2 and nearest highway Interstate 91. The neighborhood of Monroe Bridge is on the eastern part of the town near the boundaries with Rowe, which both Monroe Bridge and Rowe meet geographically along the Deerfield River. Monroe Bridge accounts for the most urban area of the town, containing a handful of two-story homes and the Monroe Town Hall, centered around Depot Street.

== Demographics ==
Historical population
Year	Pop.	±%
1840	260	—
1850	254	−2.3%
1860	236	−7.1%
1870	201	−14.8%
1880	166	−17.4%
1890	282	+69.9%
1900	305	+8.2%
1910	246	−19.3%
1920	173	−29.7%
1930	218	+26.0%
1940	207	−5.0%
1950	174	−15.9%
1960	210	+20.7%
1970	216	+2.9%
1980	179	−17.1%
1990	115	−35.8%
2000	93	−19.1%
2010	121	+30.1%
2020	118	−2.5%
2024*	115	−2.5%
* = population estimate. Source: United States census records and Population Estimates Program data.

Monroe is the smallest town by population and population density in Franklin County, and second smallest in Massachusetts. As of the census of 2000, there were 93 people, 43 households, and 23 families residing in the town. The population density was 8.7 people per square mile (3.4/km^{2}). There were 67 housing units at an average density of 6.3 per square mile (2.4/km^{2}). The racial makeup of the town was 100.00% White.

There were 43 households, out of which 32.6% had children under the age of 18 living with them, 27.9% were married couples living together, 16.3% had a female householder with no husband present, and 44.2% were non-families. Of all households 37.2% were made up of individuals, and 14.0% had someone living alone who was 65 years of age or older. The average household size was 2.16 and the average family size was 2.83.

In the town, the population was spread out, with 24.7% under the age of 18, 8.6% from 18 to 24, 23.7% from 25 to 44, 25.8% from 45 to 64, and 17.2% who were 65 years of age or older. The median age was 41 years. For every 100 females, there were 86.0 males. For every 100 females age 18 and over, there were 79.5 males.

The median income for a household in the town was $25,500, and the median income for a family was $21,250. Males had a median income of $23,750 versus $28,125 for females. The per capita income for the town was $12,400. There were 37.5% of families and 21.8% of the population living below the poverty line, including 30.8% of under eighteens and 26.7% of those 65 or older. It has the lowest per capita income for any town in Massachusetts.

== Government ==
Monroe employs the open town meeting form of government, and is led by a board of selectmen. The town has no police station, and is patrolled by the Second (Shelburne Falls) Station of Troop "B" of the Massachusetts State Police. There is a fire station, and a library connected to the regional library network. The nearest hospital, North Adams Regional Hospital, is located in North Adams.

On the state level, Monroe is represented in the Massachusetts House of Representatives as part of the First Franklin district, represented by Natalie Blais. In the Massachusetts Senate, the town is part of the Berkshire, Hampden, Franklin and Hampshire district, represented by Paul Mark, which includes all of Berkshire County and western portions of Hampden, Hampshire and Franklin Counties. It is part of the Eighth Massachusetts Governor's Council district, represented by Tara Jacobs.

On the national level, Monroe is represented in the United States House of Representatives as part of Massachusetts's 1st congressional district, and has been represented by Richard Neal of Springfield since January 2013. Massachusetts is represented in the United States Senate by senior senator Elizabeth Warren and junior senator Ed Markey.

== Education ==
Monroe does not have its own schools. Students attend the Abbott Memorial School in Florida between pre-kindergarten and eighth grades, and Drury High School in North Adams for ninth through twelfth grades. Students also have the option of attending C.H. McCann Technical School for high school, as well as the private and religious schools in the North Adams area for all grades.

The nearest community college, Greenfield Community College, is located in Greenfield. The nearest state college is Massachusetts College of Liberal Arts in North Adams, and the nearest state university is the University of Massachusetts Amherst. The nearest private college is Williams College in Williamstown.

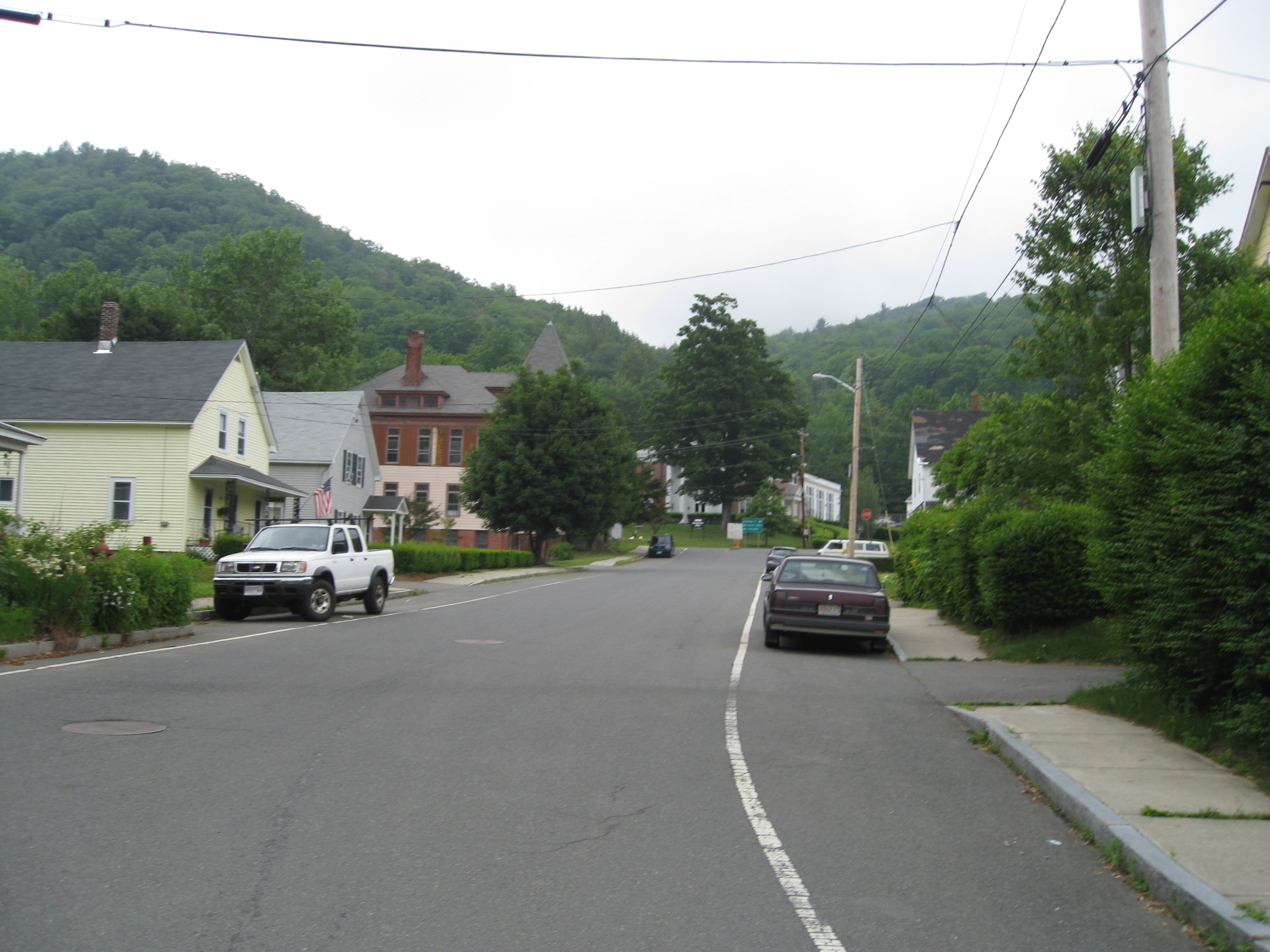
On Depot St. looking west towards town hall

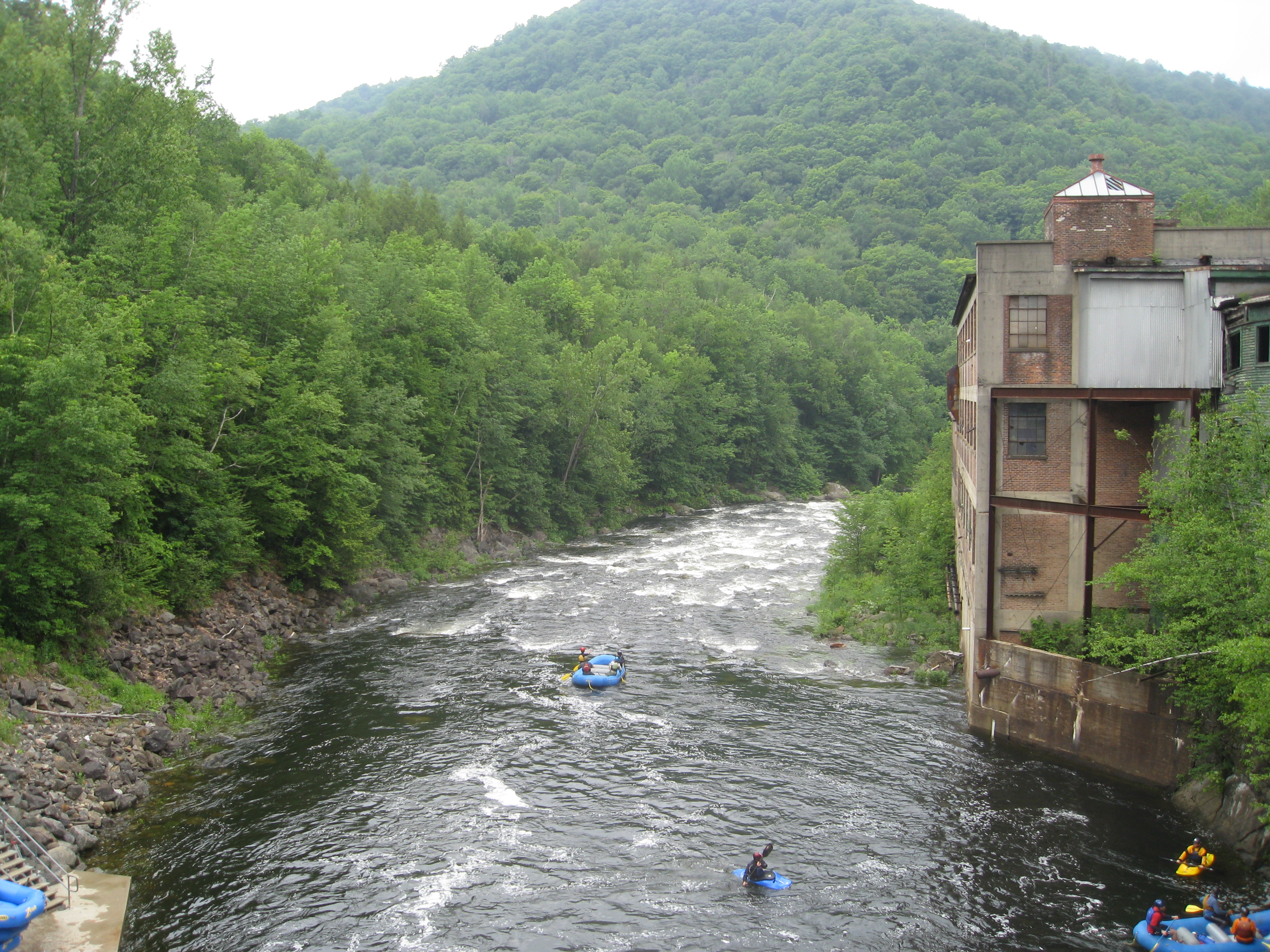
Monroe on the right (west) bank, Rowe on the left (east) bank

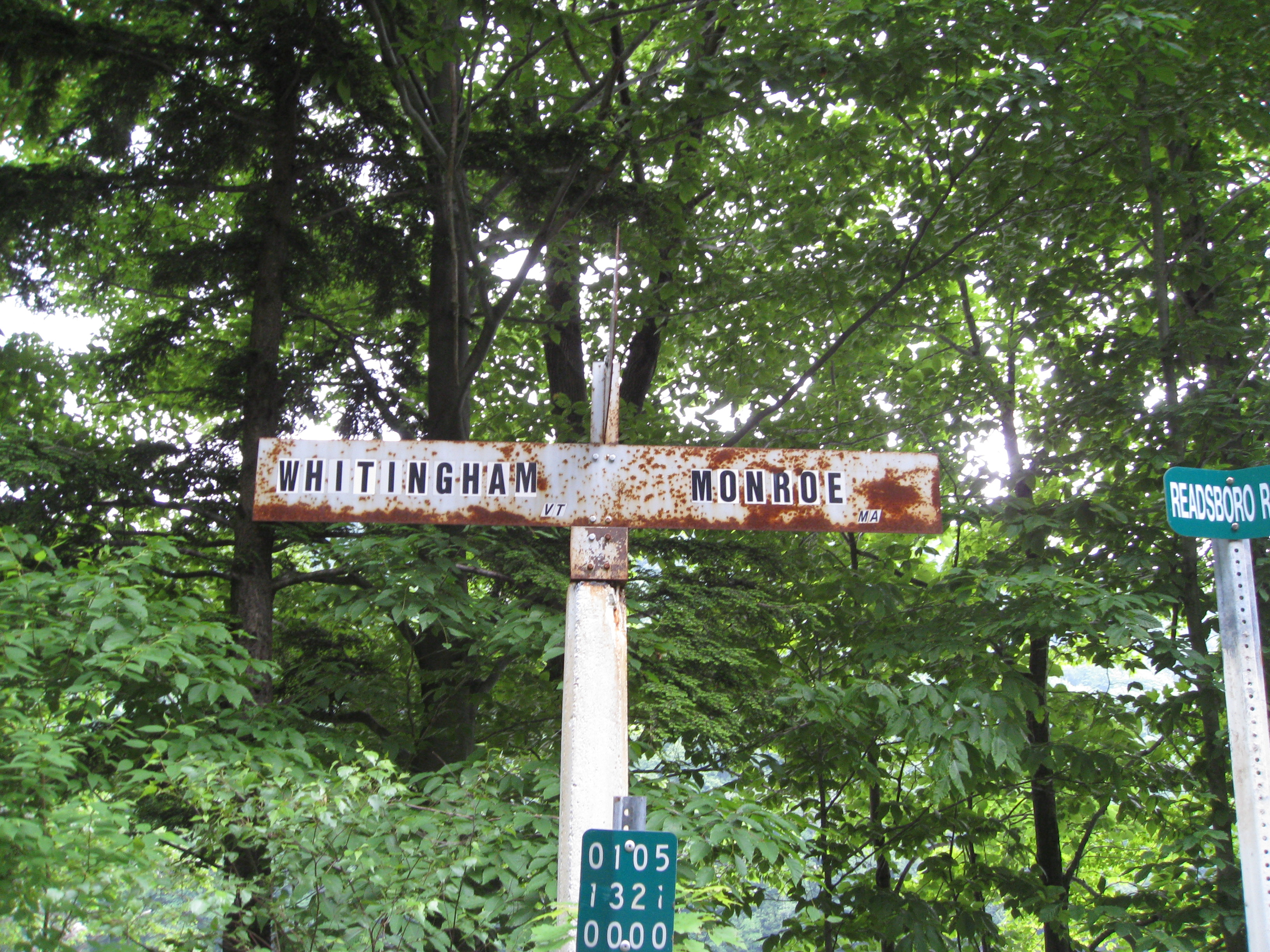
At the state line

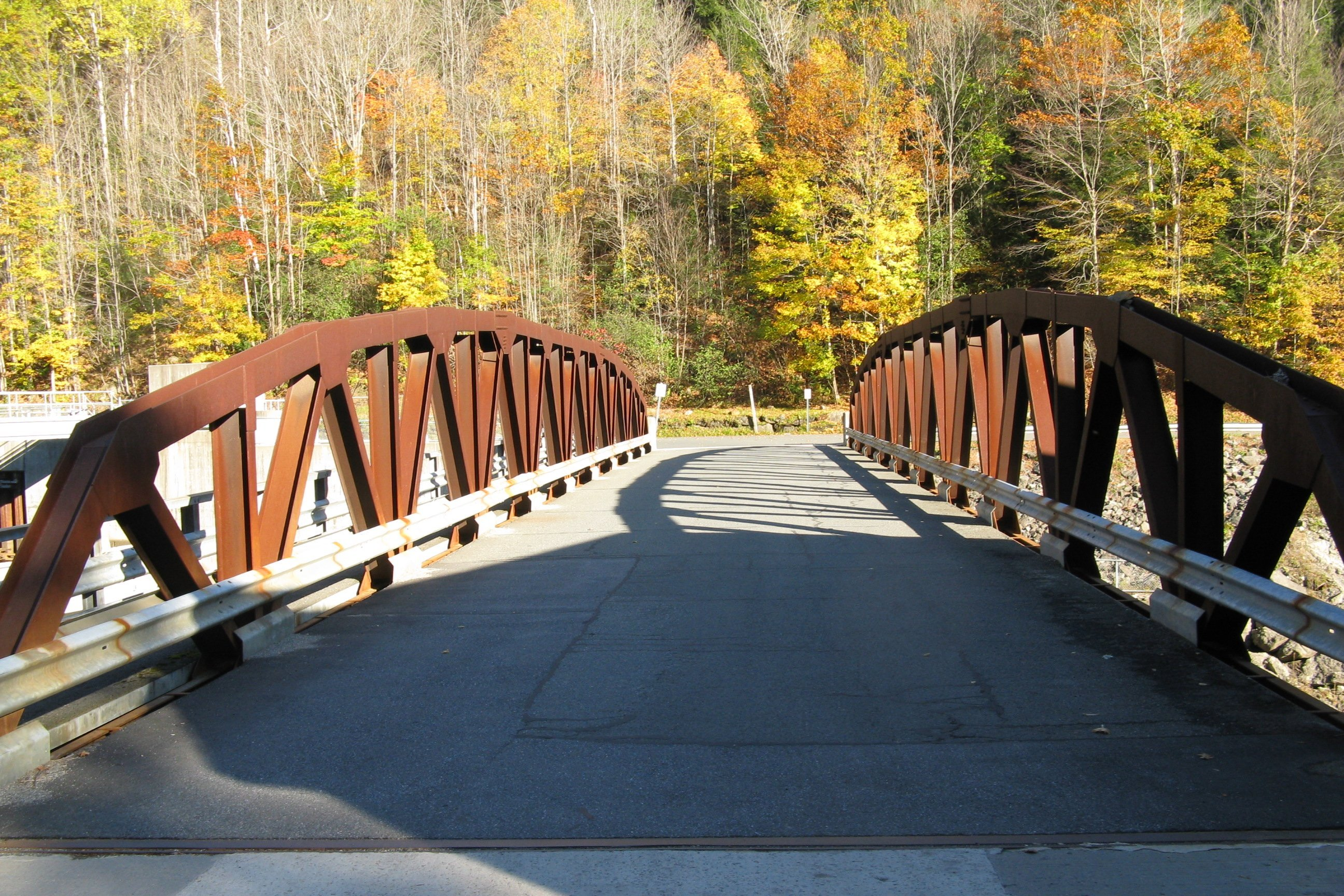
Monroe Bridge
