= Hoosac Tunnel =

Railway tunnel located in Western Massachusetts, United States

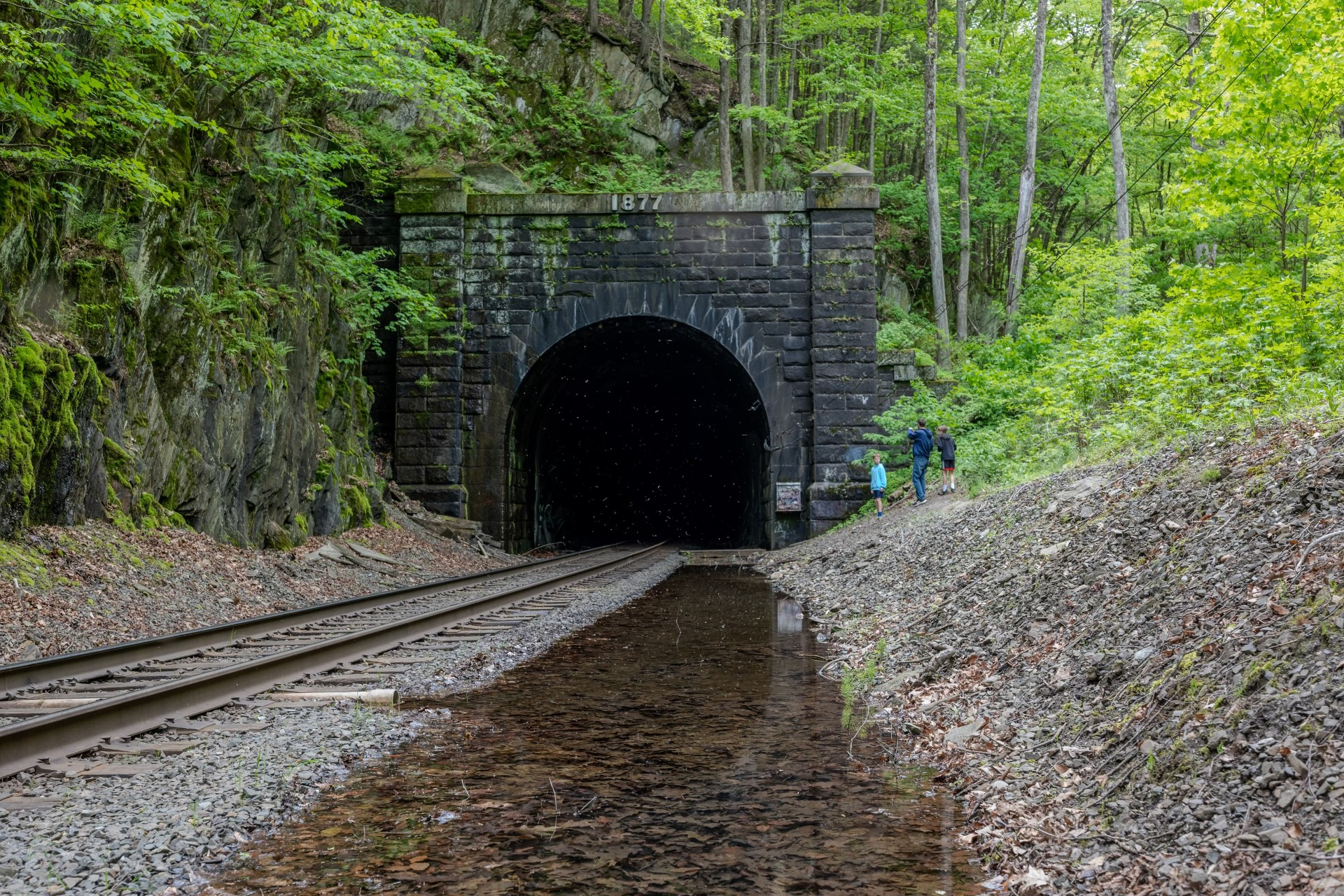
- The east portal of the Hoosac Tunnel in 2024
- Interactive map of Hoosac Tunnel

Overview
- Line: PAS Freight Main Line
- Location: Florida, Massachusetts
- Status: Operating
- System: Pan Am Southern

Operation
- Work began: 1851
- Constructed: 1851–1873
- Opened: February 9, 1875
- Owner: Pan Am Southern LLC
- Operator: Norfolk Southern, CSX Transportation
- Traffic: Train
- Character: Freight

Technical
- Length: 25,081 feet (7,645 m) long
- No. of tracks: Single
- Track gauge: 1,435 mm (4 ft 8 1/2 in) standard gauge
- Operating speed: 25 miles per hour (40 km/h)
- Tunnel clearance: 20 feet (6.1 m)
- Width: 24 feet (7.3 m)
- Hoosac Tunnel
- U.S. National Register of Historic Places
- Location within Massachusetts Location within the United States
- Location: From North Adams on the West to the Deerfield River on the East
- Coordinates: 42°40′30″N 73°2′43″W
- NRHP reference No.: 73000294
- Added to NRHP: November 2, 1973

The Hoosac Tunnel (also called Hoosic or Hoosick Tunnel) is a 4.75-mile (7.64 km) active railroad tunnel in western Massachusetts that passes through the Hoosac Range, an extension of Vermont's Green Mountains. It runs in a straight line from its east portal, along the Deerfield River in the town of Florida, to its west portal, in the city of North Adams.

Work began in 1851 under an estimated cost of $2 million and ended in 1875, having used $21 million. At its completion, the tunnel was the world's second-longest, after the 8.5-mile (13.7 km) Mont Cenis Tunnel through the French Alps. It was the longest tunnel in North America until the 1916 completion of the Connaught Tunnel under Rogers Pass in British Columbia. It remains the longest active transportation tunnel east of the Rocky Mountains, and as of 1989 is the sixth-longest railroad tunnel in North America. The American Society of Civil Engineers made the tunnel an Historic Civil Engineering Landmark in 1975.

"Hoosac" is an Algonquian word meaning "place of stones".

== Construction ==
=== Proposal and beginning ===
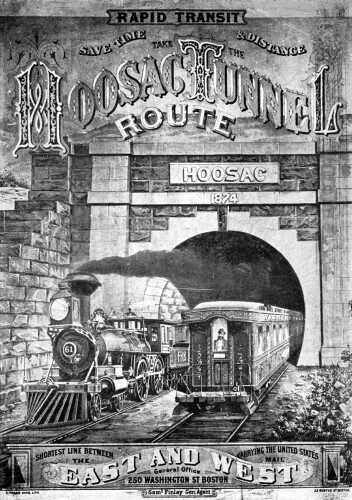
The Hoosac Tunnel Guide

The tunnel project was originally proposed in 1819 as a canal to connect Boston to Upstate New York via the Deerfield River on the east of the Hoosac Range and the Hoosic River on the west. That project was shelved, and later reborn as part of the new Troy and Greenfield Railroad. The project was nicknamed "The Great Bore" by its critics, including future Supreme Court Justice Oliver Wendell Holmes Jr., who said that he would like to "wall up a dozen lawyers at one end of the tunnel and put a good fee at the other."

The most important proponent of the northern route and the Hoosac Tunnel was Alvah Crocker, a self-made paper mill owner from Fitchburg, Massachusetts. The project was promoted by Crocker but mostly organized and engineered by others, notably Herman Haupt in the early stages, and several other firms under contract, under the direction of several head engineers assigned by the state of Massachusetts, which took over the project after it initially failed and went bankrupt. In 1841, Crocker formed the Fitchburg Railroad (chartered 1842, opened 1845) between Boston and Fitchburg.

In 1844, Crocker incorporated the existing Vermont and Massachusetts Railroad, which ran from Fitchburg west to Greenfield, as well as northward (from Millers Falls) to Brattleboro, Vermont. In 1848, Crocker secured from the legislature a charter for the Troy & Greenfield Railroad (T & G), with provisions for a tunnel through Hoosac Mountain.

The first chief engineer of the tunnel project was A.F. Edwards. In 1854, the Commonwealth of Massachusetts provided $2,000,000 (equal to $71,666,667 today) in credit to Edward Wellman Serrell and Company, which began work in 1855. In 1856, Herman Haupt took over as chief engineer.

The Western Railroad, led by Chester W. Chapin, which ran a southern route through Springfield and Pittsfield, opposed the Hoosac Tunnel and its northern route through the state. It successfully lobbied to block state funding of the tunnel in 1861, which bankrupted Haupt and temporarily stopped the project. Haupt had excavated 4,250 feet (1,300 m), or about a fifth of the distance, at that point. He left and became a Union Army railroad engineer and general in the American Civil War.

=== Completion ===
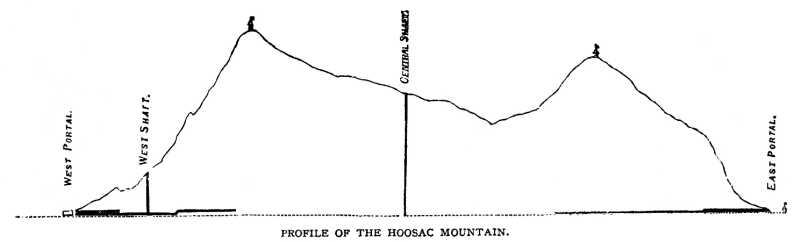
Profile of Hoosac Mountain

In 1862, the Troy and Greenfield Railroad defaulted on its loan from the Commonwealth of Massachusetts, which foreclosed on the mortgage and took control of the railroad, including the tunnel project. The state sent engineer Charles Storrow to Europe to study modern tunneling techniques, including the use of nitroglycerin and compressed air. In 1863 the state, with Alvah Crocker now superintendent of railroads, restarted the project and made Thomas Doane the chief engineer.

In 1868, the Massachusetts state legislature appropriated $5 million to complete the project. Canadian engineer Walter Shanly (sometimes spelled Shanley) and his brother Francis took over the project from the state and remained through the completion of the tunnel boring. Among the consulting engineers at the time was Benjamin Henry Latrobe II, a noted civil engineer who was serving as the chief engineer of the Baltimore and Ohio Railroad.

The final chief engineer was Bernard N. Farren, who took over on November 19, 1874, and on Thanksgiving Day that year, the last 16 feet (4.9 m) of rock was removed beneath the town of North Adams. Farren completed the work, including enlarging sections of the tunnel, reinforcing weak areas with arching, completing drainage systems and completing the east tunnel facade. The first train passed through the tunnel on February 9, 1875.

=== Technology ===
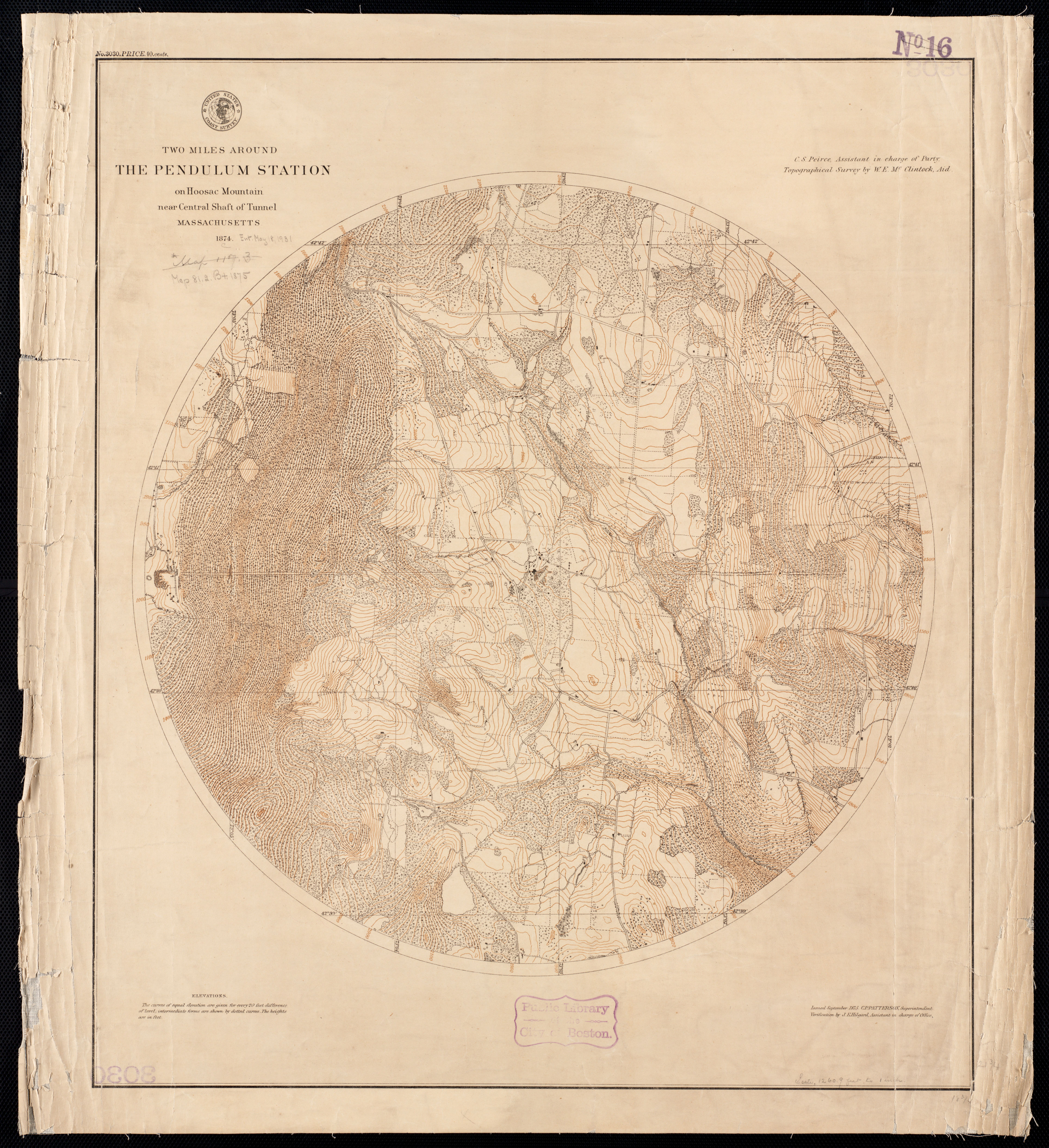
Topographic map of tunnel segments, as of 1874

The tunnel construction project required excavation of 2,000,000 tonnes (2,000,000 long tons; 2,200,000 short tons) of rock. On March 16, 1853, "Wilson's Patented Stone-Cutting Machine" (a tunnel boring machine) was used; it failed after excavating 10 feet (3.0 m) of rock. Tunnel builders resorted to hand digging, and later used the Burleigh Drilling-machine, one of the first pneumatic drills. Construction also featured the first large-scale commercial use of nitroglycerin and electric blasting caps and the first such use in the United States.

Digging the Central Shaft also allowed workers to open two additional faces to excavate: once the shaft was completed in 1870, workers dug outwards from the center to meet the tunnels being dug from the east and west portals. Engineers built a 1,000-foot (300 m) elevator to hoist the excavated rock from the Central Shaft.

One of the many engineering challenges posed by the project was getting the proper alignment between the four tunnel segments that were being dug: the east and west portal tunnels and the two tunnels dug outward from the central shaft. Engineers cleared a path through the forest over the mountain and strung a straight line from the east to west portals through "sighting posts" on the east and west peaks of Hoosac Mountain. In 1866, Thomas Doane took over as chief engineer. He resurveyed the alignment of the tunnel by constructing six towers.

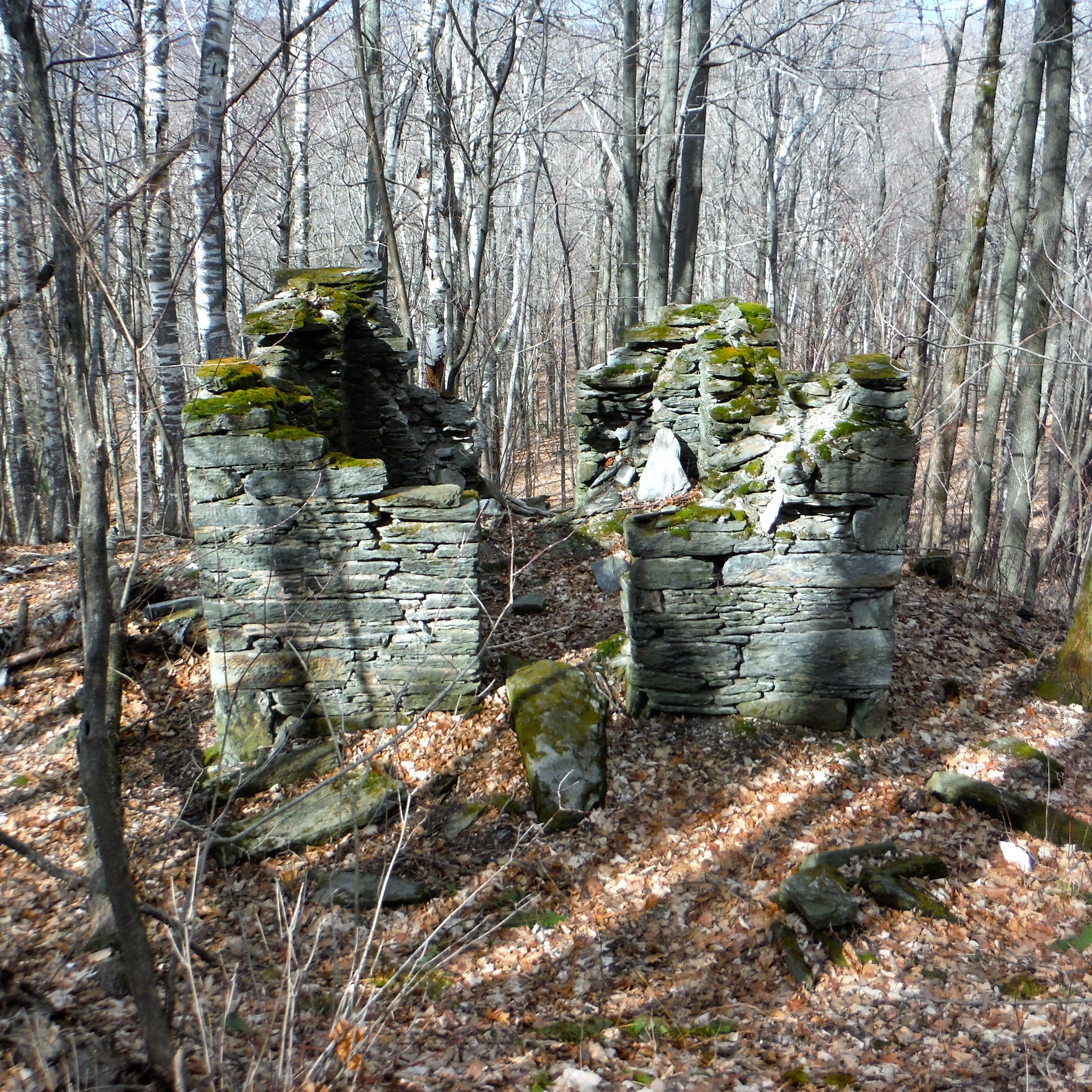
Ruins of the westernmost Hoosac Tunnel alignment tower, on Ragged Mountain in North Adams, Massachusetts

The alignment towers served to make sure the tunnel stayed true to its course. Grooved iron markers were originally used instead of these towers. Each tower, except the Rowe Neck tower, consisted of a transit scope, a sloped wooden roof on the top of the stone structure. Repeated surveys verified the line ran true between the posts, and steel bolts were installed at fixed intervals along the line. Only four of the towers remain today, in ruins, and can be found by using old roads and some bushwhacking through the current forest overgrowth.

On December 12, 1872, workers opened the east portal tunnel to the Central Shaft-dug tunnel, which were aligned within 9/16 inch (1.4 cm): a tremendous engineering achievement at that time. On November 27, 1873, the remainder of the tunnel was opened to the west portal tunnel.

The Hoosac Tunnel allowed the summit of the Fitchburg's route to be 600 feet (180 m) lower than the Boston and Albany, which only had one short tunnel. Lewis Cuyler of the Hoosac Tunnel Museum Society described the project as the "fountainhead of modern tunnel technology". The American Society of Civil Engineers made the tunnel an Historic Civil Engineering Landmark in 1975.

=== Accidents and working conditions ===
Deadly accidents during construction killed or seriously injured 195 workers with 135 verified deaths. Survivors dubbed the Tunnel the "Bloody Pit". Workers died from explosions, falling rock, and accidents involving ladders or scaffolding. In 1865, workers went on strike and burned buildings in protest. Fourteen men died or were injured working on the tunnel in 1866.

The deadliest accident was the explosion in the Central Shaft on October 17, 1867. Workers were digging the tunnel's 1,028-foot (313 m) vertical exhaust shaft when a candle in the hoist building ignited naphtha fumes that had leaked from a "Gasometer" lamp. The ensuing explosion set the hoist on fire, and it collapsed into the shaft. Four men near the top of the shaft escaped, but 13 men working 538 feet (164 m) below were trapped by falling naphtha and pieces of iron. The pumps were also destroyed, and the shaft began to fill with water. A worker named Mallory was lowered into the shaft by a rope the next day; he was overcome by fumes and reported no survivors, and no further rescue attempts were made.

Several months later, workers reached the shaft's bottom and found that several victims had survived long enough to fashion a raft before suffocating.

== Operations ==
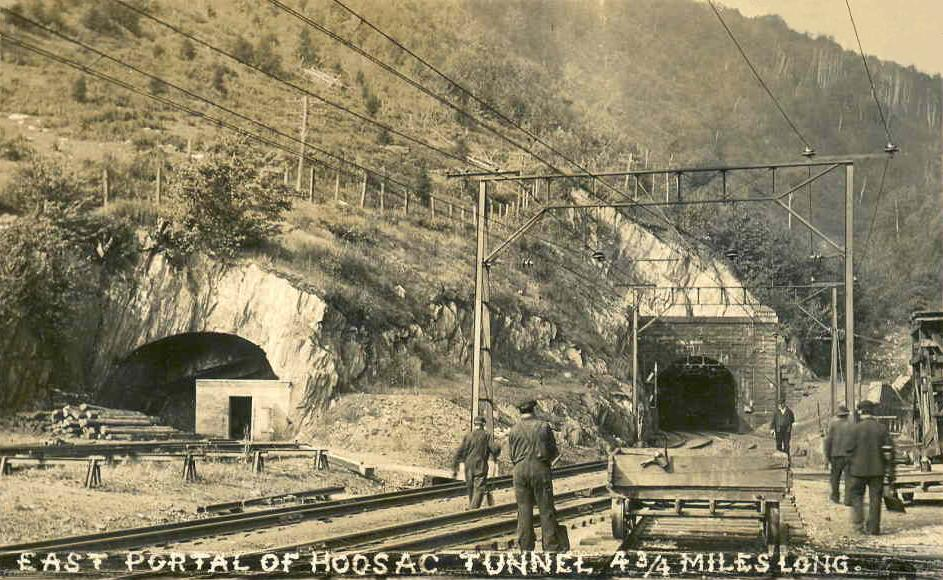
East Portal c. 1915, showing test section at left

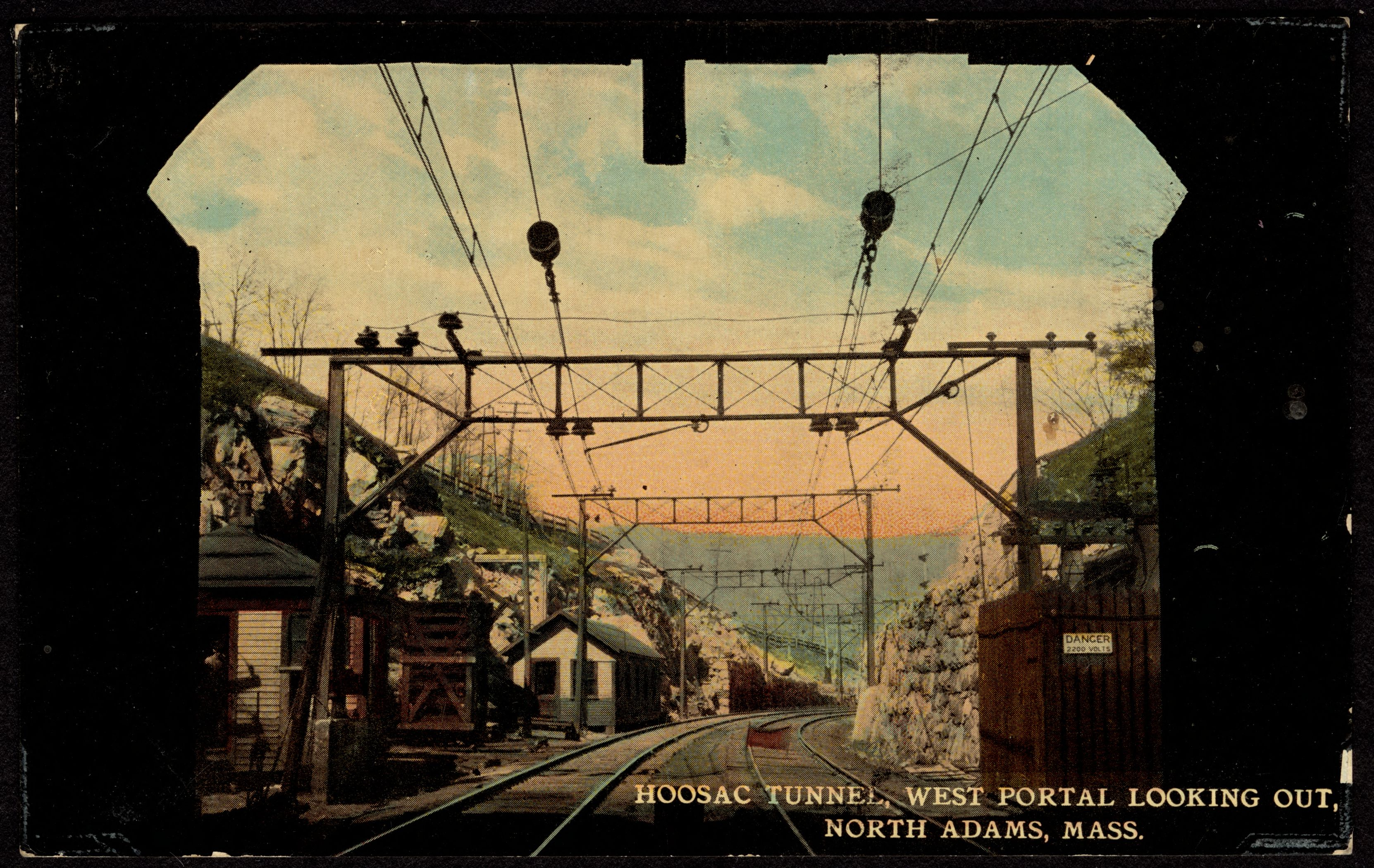
West Portal, looking out, in 1916

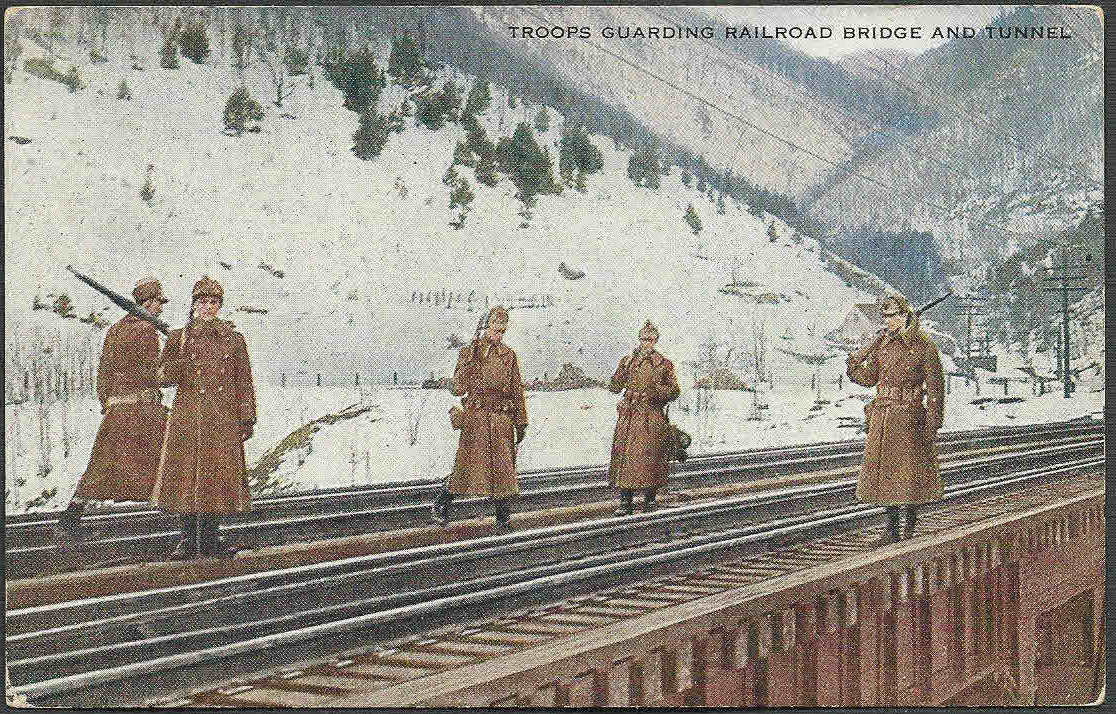
Because it was a key location for rail traffic to and from the West, the tunnel was placed under US Army guard after the United States entered World War I.

The Troy and Boston Railroad (T&B) and its Southern Vermont Railroad and Troy and Greenfield Railroad opened in 1859 from Troy, New York, on the New York Central Railroad and Hudson River Railroad, east to North Adams at the west portal of the tunnel.

The 1863 state buyout of the Troy and Greenfield Railroad opened the way for competition through the tunnel. The Boston, Hoosac Tunnel and Western Railway (BHT&W) was organized in 1877 to build from near the Massachusetts–Vermont border, where state ownership ended, parallel to the Troy and Boston Railroad to near Johnsonville, New York and then west via Schenectady to Rotterdam Junction on what became the New York, West Shore, and Buffalo Railway in 1883. The line was being planned as a part of the Delaware and Hudson Company's system (D&H) and as part of the Erie Railroad system via the Delaware and Hudson Company's Albany and Susquehanna Railroad. East of Greenfield, the east end of state ownership, the BHT&W would have built its own line to terminal facilities at Winthrop.

The first train passed through the tunnel on February 9, 1875. Regular service via the tunnel between Boston and Troy, New York began the following year. The tunnel and Troy and Greenfield Railroad were bought by the Fitchburg Railroad in 1877, which year is inscribed on the East Portal entrance arch. The Boston and Maine Railroad bought the Fitchburg Railroad in 1900.

Competition between the two companies caused various court challenges to be made. In late 1878, the T&B attempted to evict the BHT&W from the roadbed of the abandoned Albany Northern Railroad between Hart's Falls and Eagle Bridge. The BHT&W lost that case, but continued to use the right-of-way. The case lasted until late 1881, when it was overturned. In May, 1879, a frog war (a conflict between two railroads when one tries to have its tracks cross the other's) was feared at Hoosick Junction, where the BHT&W was to cross the T&B's Troy and Bennington Railroad. In July, Cornelius Vanderbilt, who owned the New York Central and Hudson River Railroad, acquired a controlling interest in the T&B, threatening to build a branch to Saratoga Springs unless the BHT&W/D&H alliance was ended. In November, an appellate court ruled that the application to cross the Troy and Bennington was improperly made to the Troy and Boston, and the T&B claimed that the improvements, including a stone bridge, were forfeit.

The first train ran over the full BHT&W to Mechanicville on December 6, 1879, and revenue service began December 20, with general offices at North Adams. In 1881, the BHT&W was being planned as part of a larger system west to Oswego and Buffalo. The line was not built, but the BHT&W opened an extension west to Rotterdam Junction on the New York, West Shore and Buffalo Railway. The New York Central and Hudson River Railroad took over the NYWS&B in 1885, and in 1887 the Fitchburg Railroad bought both the T&B and the BHT&W, as well at the Troy and Greenfield Railroad, including the tunnel, ending the rivalry.

In 1910, the tunnel was electrified with the goal of reducing smoke and increasing the speed of traffic. Three years later, traffic within the tunnel was so heavy, at 70,000 cars a month, that the power plant in Adams, with its 6000 kW generator, could not keep up. Power was then drawn from a nearby dam three miles (5 km) north of the eastern entrance. In 1926, 3,000 feet (910 m) of the western end of the tunnel were deepened by 1.5 feet (0.46 m).

Electrification ended in the tunnel in 1946 with the advent of diesel locomotives, and a fan was installed in the Central Shaft to remove Diesel exhaust fumes. Today, the Central Shaft system remains in place; however, ventilation relies on a single fan operating on low power due to the low number of trains on the line.

The last regularly scheduled Boston and Maine Railroad passenger train, the Minute Man, passed through the tunnel in 1958.

In 2009, ownership of the tunnel was transferred to Pan Am Southern, a 50-50 joint venture of Pan Am Railways and Norfolk Southern Railway. Freight trains through the tunnel are operated by Springfield Terminal Railway, the train-operating subsidiary of Pan Am Railways.

The route is used for freight now, and has seen passenger excursion trains on rare occasions. It was converted to a single track in 1957. Clearances were increased in 1997 and 2007, the former by lowering the track, the latter by grinding 15 inches (38 cm) off the roof, allowing trailer on flat car (TOFC) and tri-level automobile carriers to pass. In March 2012, the Federal Railroad Administration granted $2 million to the Massachusetts Department of Transportation for preliminary engineering to increase clearance in the tunnel for double stack container trains. In 2019, MassDOT, with FRA support, had surveyed the 155-mile (249 km) Patriot Corridor, including the Hoosac Tunnel, and identified 19 improvement projects needed for double-stack clearance; MassDOT was preparing needed environmental reviews.

On February 12, 2020, the tunnel collapsed about 300 feet (91 m) from the West Portal. More collapses occurred in the following days. While crews repaired the tunnel, freight traffic was diverted over the New England Central Railroad and Vermont Railway, and Intermodal traffic was diverted via CSX during the closure. The tunnel reopened on April 4, 2020.

In 2023, about five freight trains use the tunnel each day.

=== CSX acquisition of Pan Am Railways ===
On November 30, 2020, an agreement was announced for CSX Corporation (parent company for CSX Transportation) to acquire Pan Am Systems. With the sale, the intermodal traffic between Mechanicville and Ayer will be re-routed over the B&A to Worcester, Massachusetts. From there the traffic will come up the Worcester main and into Ayer Yard.

On April 14, 2022, The Surface Transportation Board fully accepted the purchase by CSX Transportation of Pan Am Railways and 50% of Pan Am Southern. The combination of several trackage rights agreements in the approved plan will create a new route allowing Norfolk Southern to move double-stack intermodal trains and automobile trains from Voorheesville, New York to Ayer, Massachusetts (the Southern Route). The Hoosac Tunnel on the Pan Am Southern (the Northern Route), used by NS prior to this agreement, is too low for double-stack trains. Berkshire & Eastern Railroad (B&E), a wholly owned subsidiary of Genesee & Wyoming (G&W), will replace Springfield Terminal as the operator of Pan Am Southern and the tunnel. CSX made specific commitments in its filings and entered into settlement agreements with numerous parties that had initially raised concerns about the transaction.

== See also ==
- Western Gateway Heritage State Park
- National Register of Historic Places listings in Berkshire County, Massachusetts
- Box Tunnel
