= Harriman-and-West Airport =

Harriman-and-West Airport Harriman-West Airport
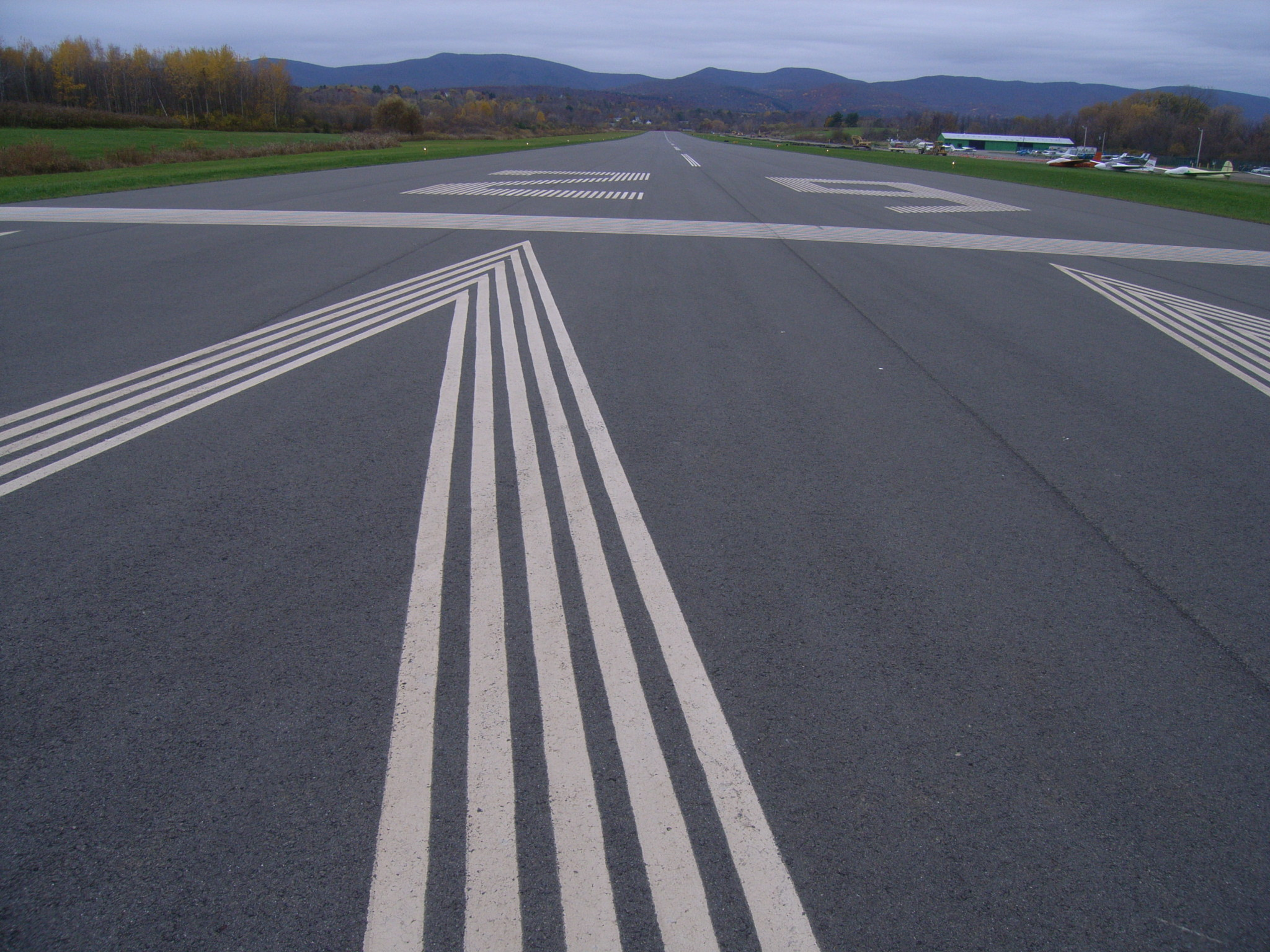
- IATA: none; ICAO: KAQW; FAA LID: AQW

Summary
- Airport type: Public
- Owner: City of North Adams
- Serves: North Adams, Massachusetts
- Elevation AMSL: 654 ft (199 m)
- Coordinates: 42°41′45″N 073°10′13″W

Map
- Interactive map of Harriman-and-West Airport

Runways
Direction	Length		Surface
Direction	ft	m	Surface
11/29	4,300	1,311	Asphalt

Statistics (2012)
- Aircraft operations: 31,755
- Source: Federal Aviation Administration

Harriman-and-West Airport (ICAO: KAQW, FAA LID: AQW), also known as Harriman & West or Harriman-West, is a public airport located three nautical miles (5 km) west of the central business district of North Adams, a city in Berkshire County, Massachusetts, United States. It is owned by the City of North Adams and is operated by a five-member Airport Commission.

This airport is assigned a three-letter location identifier of AQW by the Federal Aviation Administration, but it does not have an International Air Transport Association (IATA) airport code.

== Facilities and aircraft ==
Harriman-and-West Airport covers an area of 130 acres (53 ha) which contains one asphalt paved runway (11/29) measuring 4,300 x 100 ft (1,311 x 30 m). There are 39 aircraft based on the field. For the 12-month period ending November 6, 2012, the airport had 31,755 aircraft operations, an average of 87 per day: 96% general aviation, 3% air taxi and 1% military.
