= Hoosac Range =

Mountain range in the United States

Coordinates: 42°42′00.00″N 73°02′33.99″W

The Hoosac Range is a mountain range that forms the western edge of the northwest Berkshire Plateau of western Massachusetts, an extension of the southern Green Mountains of Vermont, which are part of the greater Appalachian Mountain chain. The mountains rise dramatically from the valleys of the Hoosic and North Hoosic rivers to the west, and the deep gorge of the upper Deerfield River valley to the east. The west branch of the Deerfield River defines the northern terminus of the range near Heartwellville, Vermont. The range features the Berkshires' high point, Crum Hill, which is located in the town of Monroe, Massachusetts.

The 4.75-mile-long (7.64 km) Hoosac Tunnel passes through the range.
