= List of mountains in Massachusetts =

This is a list of some of the mountains in the U.S. state of Massachusetts, including those in the mountain range known as the Berkshires.

Mount Greylock is the highest point in the state at 3,491 feet (1,064 m) in elevation. As such, no mountains in Massachusetts are recognized by the Appalachian Mountain Club in its list of Four-thousand footers — a list of New England peaks over 4,000 feet with a minimum 200 feet of topographic prominence. Thousands of named summits in Massachusetts (including mountains and hills) are recognized by the USGS.

== List ==
Mountain	County	Height	
Mountain	County	(feet)	(meters)
Mount Greylock	Berkshire	3,491	1,064
Saddle Ball Mountain	Berkshire	3,238	987
Mount Fitch	Berkshire	3,110	948
Mount Williams	Berkshire	2,951	899
Crum Hill	Franklin	2,841	866
Berlin Mountain	Berkshire	2,818	859
Spruce Mountain	Franklin	2,710	826
Mount Prospect	Berkshire	2,690	820
Misery Mountain	Berkshire	2,671	814
Brodie Mountain	Berkshire	2,621	799
Mount Everett	Berkshire	2,602	793
Beoadic Mountain	Berkshire	2,598	792
Mount Raimer	Berkshire	2,572	784
Bakke Mountain	Berkshire	2,566	782
Rounds Rock	Berkshire	2,559	780
Ragged Mountain	Berkshire	2,530	771
Borden Mountain	Berkshire	2,505	764
Mount Frissell	Berkshire	2,453	748
Potter Mountain	Berkshire	2,434	742
Jiminy Peak	Berkshire	2,375	724
Mount Race	Berkshire	2,365	721
Honwee Mountain	Berkshire	2,313	705
Poppy Mountain	Berkshire	2,311	704
Alander Mountain	Berkshire	2,238	682
Pine Mountain	Berkshire	2,221	677
Walling Mountain	Berkshire	2,215	676
Berry Mountain	Berkshire	2,203	671
Tower Mountain	Berkshire	2,193	668
Becket Mountain	Berkshire	2,178	664
Smith Mountain	Berkshire	2,170	660
Lenox Mountain	Berkshire	2,113	644
Adams Mountain	Franklin	2,110	643
Cole Mountain	Berkshire	2,106	642
Perry Peak	Berkshire	2,070	621
Harvey Mountain	Berkshire	2,060	628
Mount Wachusett	Worcester	2,006	611
West Mountain		1,942	592
Tom Ball Mountain		1,928	588
Pine Cobble Mountain	Berkshire	1,894	577
Pocumtuck Mountain	Franklin	1,872	571
Beartown Mountain		1,865	568
Mahanna Cobble		1,858	566
Shaker Mountain	Berkshire	1,835	559
Mount Watatic	Worcester, Middlesex	1,832	558
West Stockbridge Mountain	Berkshire	1,798	548
Osceda Mountain		1,762	537
Monument Mountain	Berkshire	1,710	521
Mount Lebanon		1,699	517
Baldhead		1,663	507
Mount Peak	Franklin	1,650	503
Mount Grace	Franklin	1,617	493
Chadbournes Knoll		1,598	487
Little Watatic Mountain		1,595	486
Massaemett Mountain	Franklin	1,588	484
Little Wachusett		1,564	477
Osceola Mountain		1,542	470
Mount Institute	Franklin	1,536	468
Mount Hunger		1,453	443
Mount Pleasant		1,289	393
Mount Toby	Franklin	1,269	387
Little Grace Mountain		1,259	384
Mount Jefferson	Worcester	1,221	372
Mount Tom	Hampden, Hampshire	1,214	370
Northfield Mountain	Franklin	1,206	368
Tully Mountain	Franklin	1,161	354
Tekoa Mountain	Hampden	1,121	342
Mount Norwottuck	Hampshire	1,106	337
Rattlesnake Mountain (Farley Ledges)	Franklin	1,067	323
Whiting Peak		1,001	305
Mount Holyoke	Hampshire	935	285
Little Tully Mountain		856	261
Mount Nonotuck		827	252
Sugarloaf Mountain		791	241
East Mountain		776	237
Mount Pisgah		715	218
Vaughn Hill		637	194
Great Blue Hill		635	194
South Sugarloaf Mountain		625	190
Nobscot Hill		602	183
Peppercorn Hill	Worcester, Middlesex	574	174
Gibbs Mountain		499	152
Prospect Hill		485	148
Little Mountain		459	140
Mount Ward		410	124
Mount Misery		285	86
Waitt's Mountain		210	64
Mount Surat		154	47
Mount Cary		102	31
Nauset Beach Dunes		7	2.1

== Mountain ranges in Massachusetts ==
- Appalachian Mountains
- The Berkshires
- Hoosac Range
- Taconic Mountains
- Metacomet Ridge
- Wapack Range

== See also ==
- Geography of Massachusetts
- List of mountains of the Appalachians
