= Mount Williams (Massachusetts) =

Mountain in Massachusetts, United States

Highest point
- Elevation: 2,951 ft (899 m)
- Coordinates: 42°40′05″N 73°09′29″W

Geography
- Location: Berkshire County, Massachusetts
- Parent range: Greylock Range

Mount Williams is the 4th highest peak in the Commonwealth of Massachusetts. It is located in the Greylock Range in Berkshire County. Its altitude is 2,951 feet.

== Recreation ==
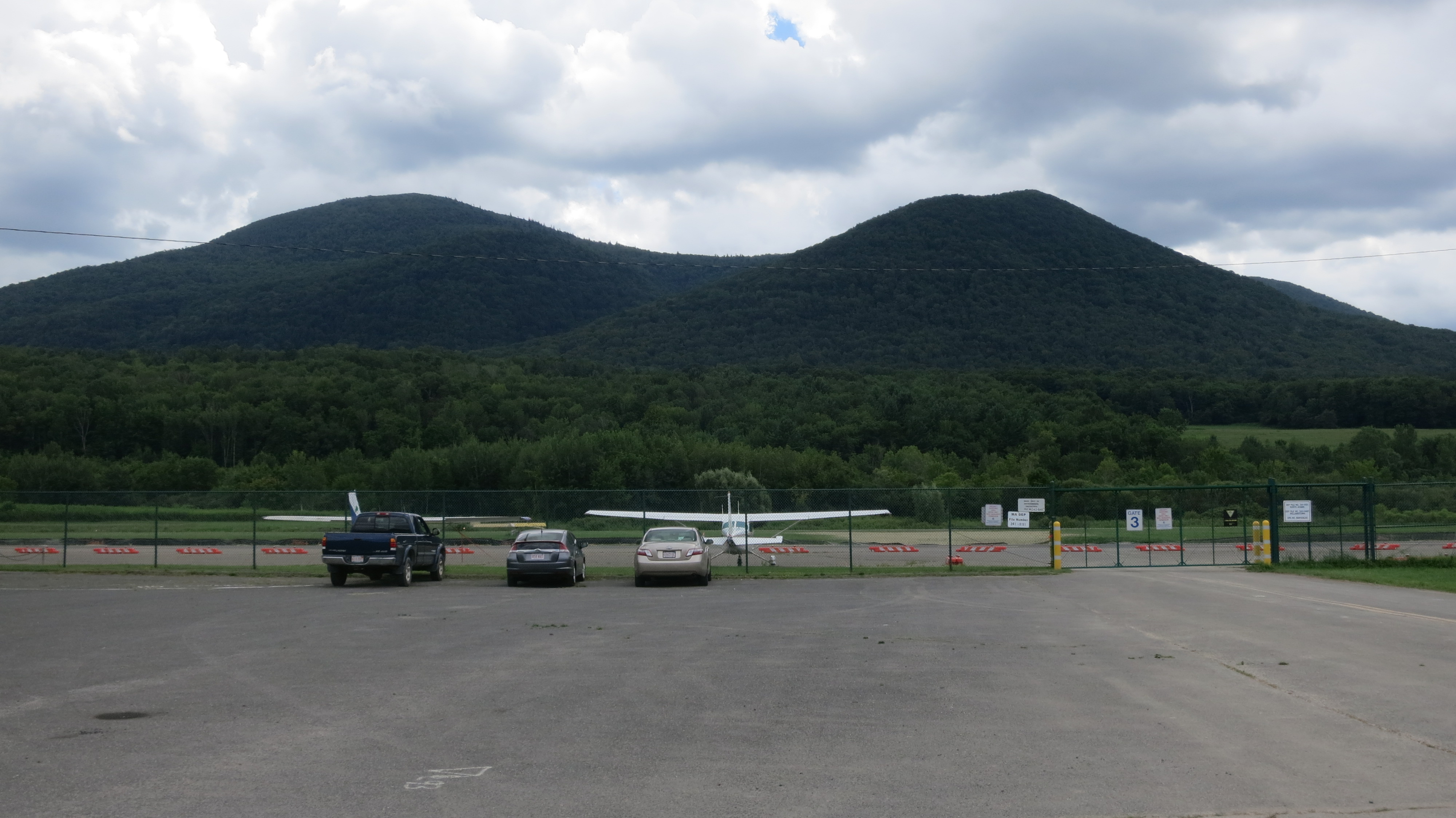
Mt. Williams (on the left) Mt. Prospect (on the right) dominate the view from Route 2 near the Harriman-and-West Airport in North Adams, MA.

Located within the Mount Greylock State Reservation, approaches to this peak begin at a variety of trailheads within the Reservation. Parking is available at most trailheads. The Appalachian Trail traverses the summit of Mount Williams where there is a wide vista overlooking Williamstown and North Adams, MA as well as Pine Cobble Mountain to the north.

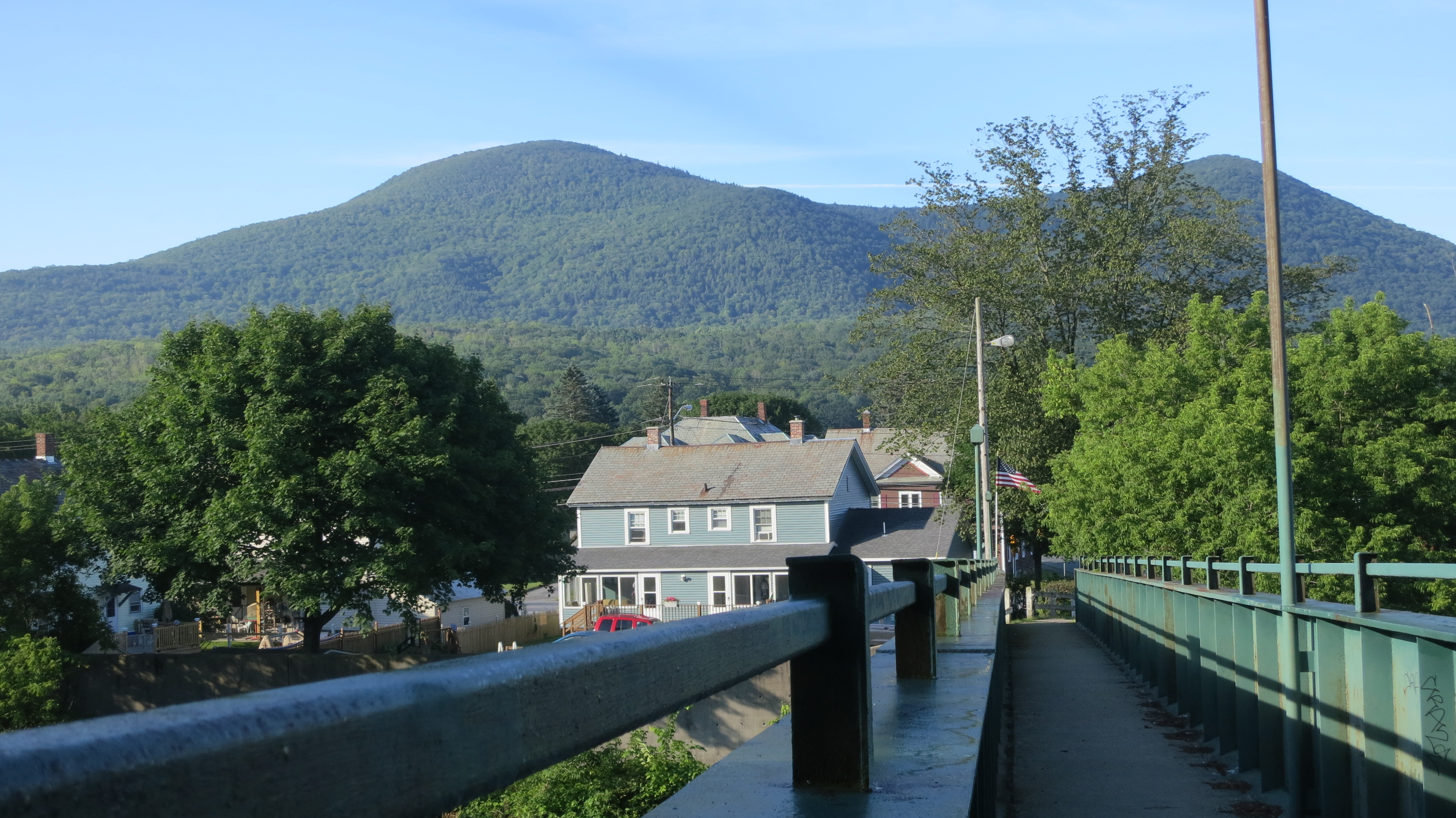
Mount Williams (the peak on the left) as seen from North Adams. The footbridge in the foreground spanning the Hoosic River and railroad tracks is part of the Appalachian Trail.

== Geology, geography, and other information ==
Further details about Mount Williams are included in the adjacent mountain descriptions: Greylock, Fitch and Saddle Ball.
