= Geography of Massachusetts =

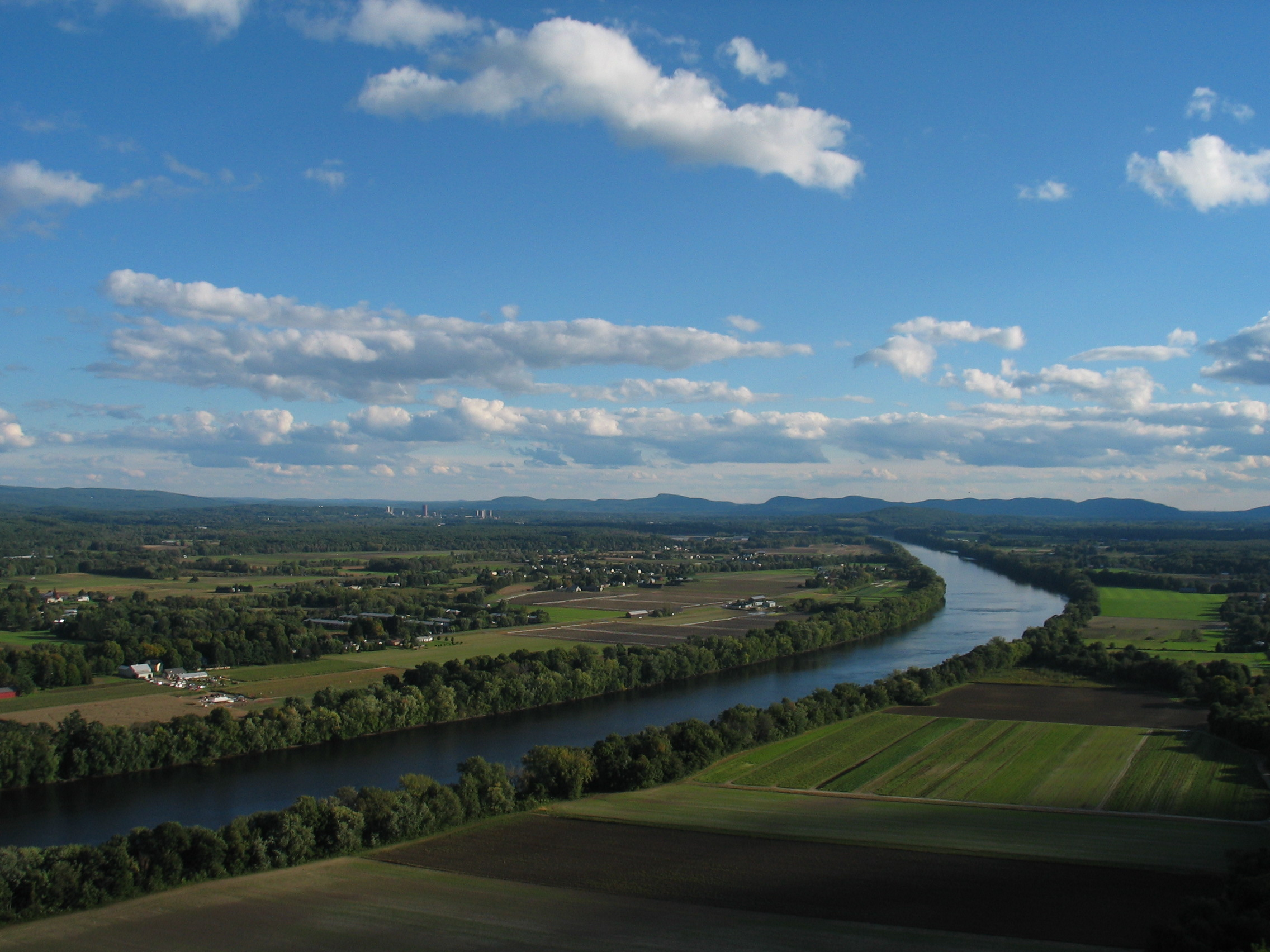
Part of the north-central Pioneer Valley in Sunderland, much more rural than Springfield, in the southern part of the valley, or Boston, which is on the coast

Massachusetts is the seventh-smallest state in the United States with an area of 10,555 square miles (27,340 km^{2}). It is bordered to the north by New Hampshire and Vermont, to the west by New York, to the south by Connecticut and Rhode Island, and to the east by the Atlantic Ocean and Gulf of Maine. Massachusetts is the most populous New England state.

Massachusetts is nicknamed "The Bay State" because of several large bays, which distinctly shape its coast: Massachusetts Bay and Cape Cod Bay, to the east; Buzzards Bay, to the south; and several cities and towns on the Massachusetts–Rhode Island border sit adjacent to Mount Hope Bay. At the southeastern corner of the state is a large, sandy, arm-shaped peninsula, Cape Cod, which forms the southern boundary of the Gulf of Maine to the north. The islands Martha's Vineyard and Nantucket lie south of Cape Cod, across Nantucket Sound. Central Massachusetts features rolling, rocky hills, while Western Massachusetts encompasses a fertile valley and mountains surrounding the Connecticut River, as well as the Berkshire Mountains.

Boston is Massachusetts' largest city, at the inmost point of Massachusetts Bay, the mouth of the Charles River. Most Bay Staters live in the Boston area, which covers most of eastern Massachusetts. Eastern Massachusetts is fairly densely populated and mostly suburban. Western Massachusetts features both the Connecticut River Valley—a fairly even mix of urban enclaves (e.g. Springfield, Northampton), and rural college towns (Amherst, South Hadley)—and the Berkshire Mountains, (a branch of the Appalachian Mountains) that remains mostly rural.

Massachusetts has 351 cities and towns. Every part of the state is within an incorporated city or town, but many towns include large rural areas. The state's 14 counties have few government functions and serve as little more than judicial districts.

== Overview ==
In Eastern Massachusetts, Boston is located at the innermost point of Massachusetts Bay, at the mouth of the Charles River. The Charles River is longest river located entirely within Massachusetts, (although the Westfield River can be considered longer if one combines its upper and lower branches); however, the Connecticut River is the Commonwealth's—and New England's—longest, and most significant river. Most of the population of the Boston metropolitan area (approximately 4.4 million) lives outside of the city proper. The City of Boston itself is densely urban. Generally, Eastern Massachusetts, including and surrounding Boston, is densely populated. Boston's suburbs stretch as far west as the City of Worcester in Central Massachusetts.

Central Massachusetts encompasses Worcester County, which is hilly and rocky. It features the urban city of Worcester, and the smaller cities of Fitchburg, Leominster, Gardner, and Southbridge. Central Massachusetts also includes many rural hill towns, forests, and small farms. The geographic center of Massachusetts is in the town of Rutland, in central Worcester County. The Quabbin Reservoir (formed by the dammed Swift River—a former Connecticut River tributary), borders the western side of the county; it is the main water supply for Greater Boston.

The Connecticut River Valley features Massachusetts'—and some of the northeastern United States'—richest soil, due to Ice Age deposits by glacial Lake Hitchcock. The lower (southern) Connecticut River Valley features the city of Springfield, which sits a mere five miles (8.0 km) north of the Connecticut border at the confluence of three of Massachusetts' most significant rivers: the Connecticut (flowing north–south); the Westfield (flowing into the Connecticut from the west); and the Chicopee (flowing into the Connecticut from the east). Only 24 miles (39 km) separate Springfield from the State of Connecticut's capital city, Hartford—the Springfield-Hartford region is the second most populous region in New England (with approximately 1.9 million residents). Other cities in the Massachusetts portion of the New Haven-Hartford-Springfield arm of the Northeast megapolis include: Chicopee, Agawam, West Springfield, Westfield, Holyoke, and the college towns of Northampton, Amherst, and South Hadley.

Further west rises a range of rolling, purple mountains known as the Berkshires. Near the New York border, the Taconic and Hoosac Ranges cross into Massachusetts; however, in general, the area is known as The Berkshires. The region was populated by Native Americans until the 18th century when Scotch-Irish settlers arrived, after having found the fertile lowlands along the Connecticut River settled. On reaching the Berkshires, settlers found poor soil for farming, but discovered numerous fast-moving rivers for industry. Pittsfield and North Adams grew into small, albeit prosperous cities. A number of smaller mill towns exist along the Westfield and Housatonic Rivers, interspersed with wealthy vacation resort towns.

The National Park Service administers a number of natural and historical sites in Massachusetts. Along with twelve national historic sites, areas, and corridors, the National Park Service also manages the Cape Cod National Seashore and the Boston Harbor Islands National Recreation Area. In addition, the Massachusetts Department of Conservation and Recreation maintains a number of parks, trails, and beaches throughout the commonwealth.

== Physical geography ==
Massachusetts terrain features a low coastal plain in the east, the New England Uplands, the Pioneer Valley, and the Berkshire and Taconic Mountains in the west. Further west rises a range of rolling, purple mountains known as the Berkshires. Near the New York border, the Taconic and Hoosac Ranges cross into Massachusetts; however, in general, the area is known as The Berkshires.

Massachusetts extends from the mountains of the Appalachian system in the west to the sandy beaches and rocky shorelines of the Atlantic coast. The entire state was covered in ice during the Wisconsin glaciation, which shaped today's landscape. Much of the state remains covered in glacial till and dotted with typical glacial features, such as kettle ponds, drumlins, eskers, and moraines. Apart from a few alluvial floodplains, soils tend to be rocky, acidic, and not very fertile.

Part of the state is uplands of resistant metamorphic rock that were scraped by Pleistocene glaciers that deposited moraines and outwash on a large, sandy, arm-shaped peninsula called Cape Cod and the islands Martha's Vineyard and Nantucket to the south of Cape Cod. Upland elevations increase dramatically in Western Massachusetts. These uplands are interrupted by the downfaulted southern Pioneer Valley along the Connecticut River and further west by the Housatonic Valley separating the Berkshire Hills from the Taconic Range along the western border with New York. The highest peak in the state is Mount Greylock at 3,491 feet (1,064 m) near the northwest corner.

=== Topography ===
Elevation and relief are greatest in the western part of the state and increase somewhat from south to north. The Taconic Mountains, part of the Appalachian system, run along the western border with New York, reaching 2,624 feet (800 meters) at Mount Everett in the state's southwest corner, and including the state's highest point, Mount Greylock, at 3,491 feet (1,064 meters) in the northwest corner. The Housatonic-Hoosic valley separates the Taconics from The Berkshires, a broad belt of steeply rolling hills that are a southern extension of the Green Mountains of Vermont. They extend south to the border of Connecticut. Mount Greylock lies on the western edge of the Taconic Range, across the Hoosic River from the Hoosac Range to the east. The Hoosac Range connects the Green Mountains with the Berkshires.

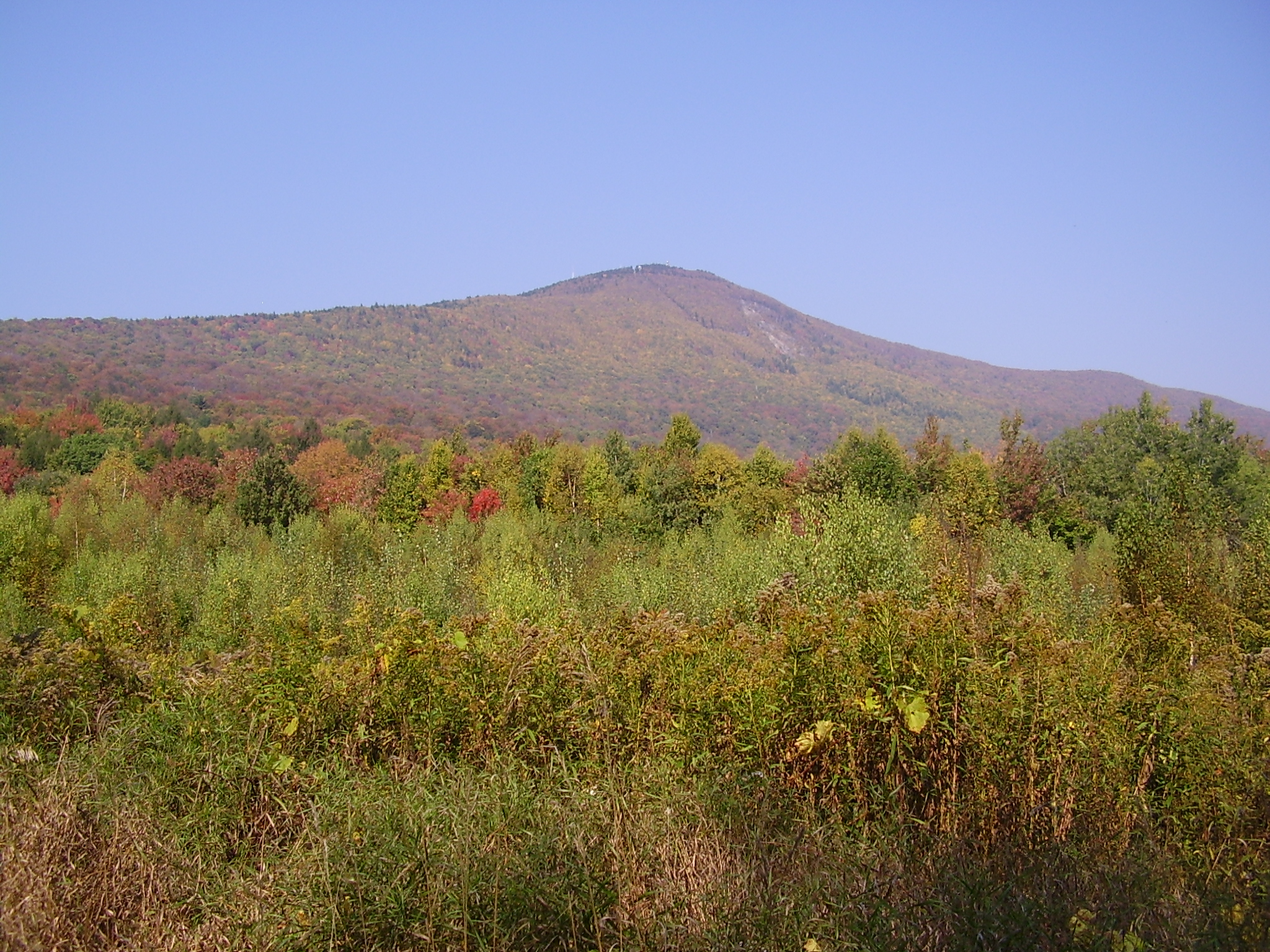
Mount Greylock, in Berkshire County, is the highest point in Massachusetts, with an elevation of 3,491 feet (1,064 m).

Between the Berkshires and the rest of the state lies the Connecticut River Valley, known within Massachusetts as the Pioneer Valley. This ancient rift valley appeared in the Mesozoic Era when North and South America broke away from Europe and Africa. Dinosaur footprints near Mount Tom bear witness to that era, and series of basalt and sedimentary rock ridges (collectively known as the Metacomet Ridge) including Mount Toby, Mount Holyoke, Mount Tom, and others extending south to Long Island Sound and the valley's abrupt thousand-foot (300 meter) western escarpment illustrate the tectonic forces. More than a hundred million years later, as the Pleistocene epoch ended, receding glaciers left moraines that dammed the Connecticut River, creating Lake Hitchcock. Lacustrine silt deposits replaced soil scraped away by the glaciers, leaving behind deep, productive soil after the river breached the obstructing moraine and the lake disappeared.

East of this valley is an area of rolling uplands dotted with lakes and dissected by streams flowing into the Connecticut River in the west and into the Merrimack, Quinebaug, Blackstone, or Charles rivers, or into other shorter, coastal rivers in the east. Just to the east of the Pioneer Valley, hills rise steeply toward the divide between the Connecticut River basin and the river basins to the east. This divide runs through central Massachusetts, though the summit of Mount Wachusett, the highest point in the state east of the Connecticut River, rising to 2,006 feet (611 meters).

To the east of this divide, the elevation of the hilltops gradually decreases, and the landscape is more gently rolling. Within 30 miles (48 kilometers) of the coast, few hills exceed 300 feet (91 meters) in elevation. Near the coast, swamps, marshes, and ponds alternate with low hills. However, the Blue Hills, just south of Boston, rise above the surrounding landscape. The state probably takes its name from the Massachusett name for their highest point, Great Blue Hill, with an elevation of 635 feet (194 meters).

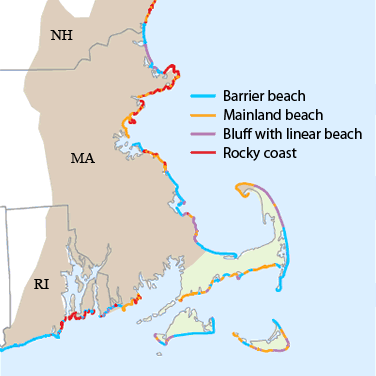
Coastal landforms in Massachusetts

The Massachusetts coastline is deeply indented with bays, coves, and estuaries, separated by narrow promontories. Some of these form natural harbors that gave rise to the state's historic ports, including Newburyport, Gloucester, Salem, Boston, and New Bedford. The state has a few small barrier islands, the largest of which is Plum Island. The state's largest promontory is the Cape Cod peninsula. Its backbone is formed by glacial moraines, but much of its coastline has been shaped by the longshore drift of coastal sand, which forms many of its famous sandy beaches. To the south of Cape Cod, glacial moraines rise above the ocean surface to form the state's largest islands: Martha's Vineyard, Nantucket, the Elizabeth Islands, and Monomoy Island.

=== Climate ===
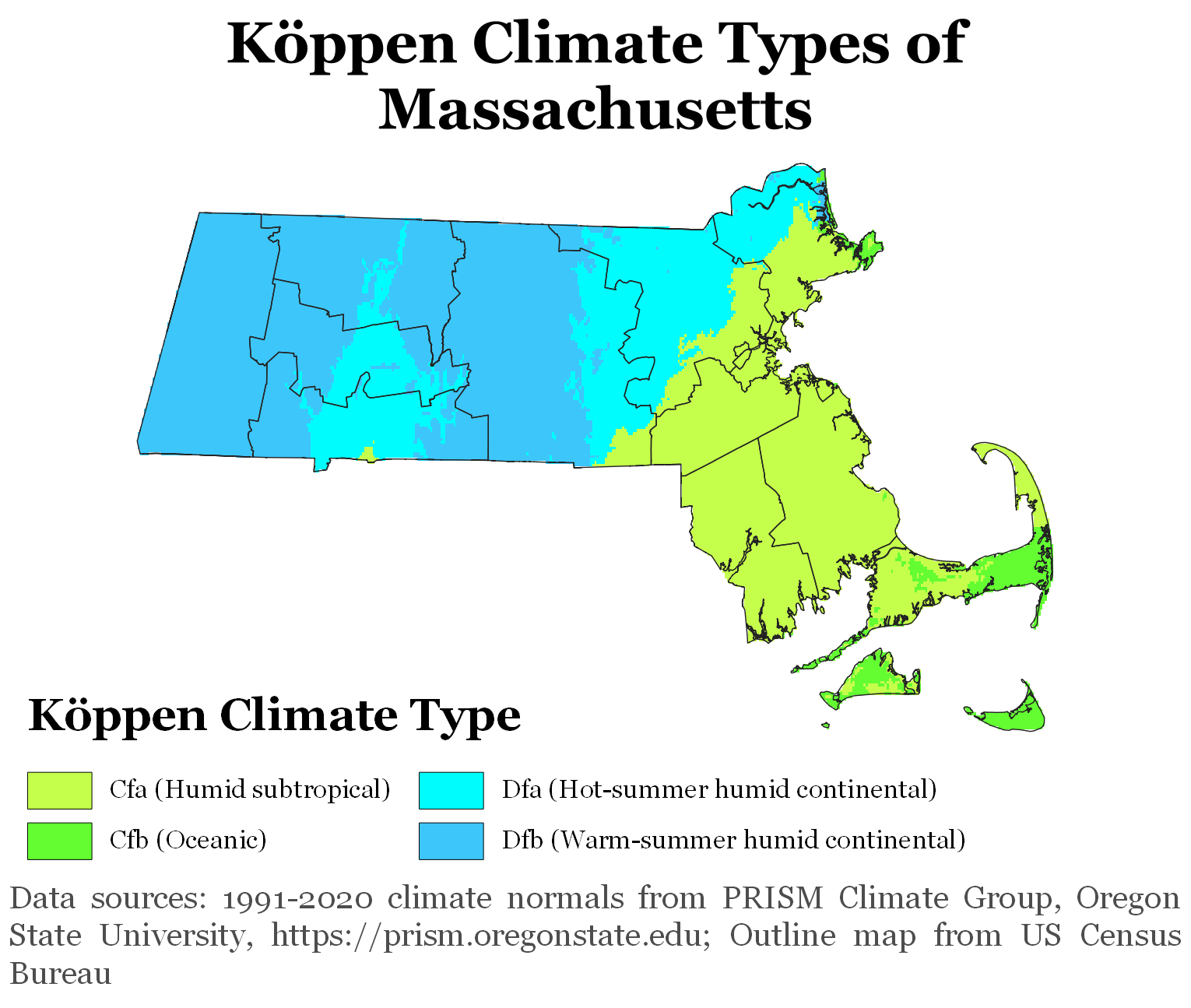
Köppen climate types of Massachusetts, using 1991-2020 climate normals

Massachusetts has a humid continental climate. Summers are warm, while winters are relatively cold, with average January temperatures below freezing throughout most of the state.

Generally, Massachusetts' hilly central interior (e.g. Worcester) and its western Berkshire Mountain region (e.g. Pittsfield) have colder winters than its coastal and Connecticut River Valley regions. Stockbridge, in the Berkshires, has a January average temperature of 21.6 °F (−5.8 °C). In Eastern Massachusetts, Boston, on the coast of Massachusetts Bay, has an average January temperature of 29.0 °F (−1.7 °C). The island of Martha's Vineyard has the state's highest average temperature—31.8 °F (−0.1 °C), due to the warming effect of the Atlantic Ocean. Summer temperatures are highest in the state's urban centers, due to the heat island effect. Average July temperatures in Massachusetts' three most populous urban centers are: Boston (coastal) - 81.7 °F (27.6 °C); Worcester (central) - 79.2 °F (26.2 °C); and Springfield (Connecticut River Valley) - 85.0 °F (29.4 °C). By contrast, the coolest average summer temperatures occur in the Berkshires and on the state's offshore islands. The average temperature in August, the warmest month on Nantucket Island, is 68.7 °F (20.4 °C). The average in July in Stockbridge is 68.9 °F (20.5 °C). Both daily and seasonal variation in temperature are greatest in the Berkshires and lowest along the coast.

Precipitation is spread fairly evenly throughout the year in Massachusetts. Boston averages 43 inches (1,100 mm) of precipitation annually, with a maximum monthly average of 4.3 inches (110 mm) in November and a minimum monthly average of 2.9 inches (74 mm) in July. Springfield, in the Pioneer Valley, averages 45.8 inches (1,160 mm) of annual precipitation, with a 4.6 inches (120 mm) maximum monthly average in June and a 2.7 inches (69 mm) minimum monthly average in February. Interior Massachusetts tends to have a summer precipitation maximum due to convection in air masses heated over the interior, which gives rise to frequent thunderstorms. These occur less frequently over the coast, due to the relative lack of convection over the cooler ocean waters. On the other hand, cold, dry air masses over the interior of the state tend to suppress winter precipitation.

All regions of Massachusetts experience substantial snowfall in a typical winter; however, generally, coastal areas (e.g. Boston, Cape Cod,) and the Connecticut River Valley (e.g. Springfield) receive approximately 2/3 the amount of snowfall of central Massachusetts (e.g. Worcester) and the Berkshires (e.g. Pittsfield.) Total annual snowfalls average 43.3 inches (110 cm) in Boston; 43.2 inches (110 cm) in Springfield; and 69.1 inches (176 cm) in Worcester. The ground is often covered with snow for weeks at a time during January and February.

Although Massachusetts has a humid climate, its climate is sunny compared to other humid climates at the same latitude. In Boston, the average percentage of possible sunshine for every month is at least 50%. In summer and early autumn, the average percentage of possible sunshine is greater than 60%, according to National Weather Service data. The hottest temperature recorded was 108 degrees Fahrenheit (42.8 degrees Celsius).

=== Ecology ===
The primary biome of inland Massachusetts is temperate deciduous forest. Although much of the state had been cleared for agriculture, leaving only traces of old growth forest in isolated pockets, secondary growth has regenerated in many rural areas as farms have been abandoned. The areas most affected by human development include the Greater Boston area in the east, the smaller Springfield metropolitan area in the west, and the largely agricultural Pioneer Valley. Animals that have become locally extinct over the past few centuries include gray wolves, elk, wolverines, and mountain lions.

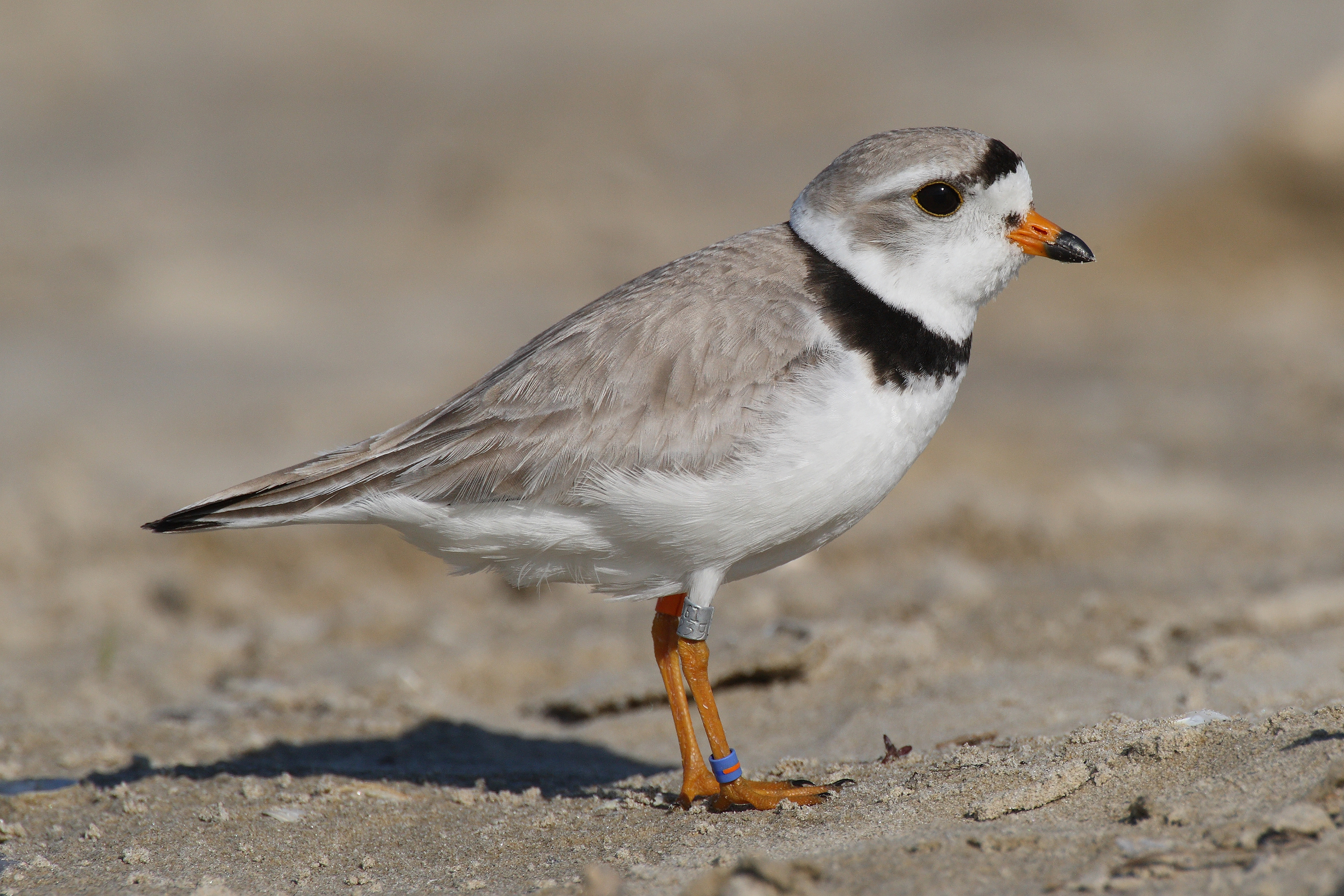
Many coastal areas in Massachusetts provide breeding areas for species such as the piping plover.

A number of species are doing well, despite, and in some cases because of the increased urbanization of the commonwealth. Peregrine falcons utilize office towers in larger cities as nesting areas, and the population of coyotes, whose diet may include garbage and roadkill, has been increasing in recent decades. White-tailed deer, raccoons, wild turkeys and eastern gray squirrels are also found throughout Massachusetts. In more rural areas in the western part of the state, larger mammals such as moose and black bears have returned, largely due to reforestation following the regional decline in agriculture.

Massachusetts is located along the Atlantic Flyway, a major route for migratory waterfowl along the Atlantic coast. Lakes in central Massachusetts provide habitat for the common loon, while a significant population of long-tailed ducks winter off Nantucket. Small offshore islands and beaches are home to roseate terns and are important breeding areas for the locally threatened piping plover. Protected areas such as the Monomoy National Wildlife Refuge provide critical breeding habitat for shorebirds and a variety of marine wildlife including a large population of gray seals.

Freshwater fish species in the commonwealth include bass, carp, catfish, and trout, while saltwater species such as Atlantic cod, haddock and American lobster populate offshore waters. Other marine species include harbor seals, the endangered North Atlantic right whales, as well as humpback whales, fin whales, minke whales and Atlantic white-sided dolphins.

=== Environment ===
Most of Massachusetts is forested. Even suburban eastern Massachusetts is heavily wooded. Trees tend to grow around houses in this region, such that when one looks out over eastern Massachusetts from the top of a high hill, one sees a vista of treetops, punctuated only occasionally by a church steeple, smokestack, or radio tower.

According to U.S. government data, 46% of Massachusetts land is devoted to forest. Another 7% is rural parkland, which is also mainly forested. Urban and suburban development takes up 36% of the state's land, but even this land, outside of the main urban centers, consists largely of houses on wooded properties. About 4% of the state's land is cropland, and less than 1% is pasture. About 2% of the state's land is marsh or other wetland. The remainder of the land is taken up with other uses, such as transportation.

Three ecoregions comprise the natural environment of Massachusetts. Atlantic coastal pine barrens occur on Cape Cod, Nantucket, and Martha's Vineyard. These are fire-prone temperate coniferous forests growing on the sandy soils of the coastal plain. The other two ecoregions are temperate broadleaf and mixed forests. Across most of the state, including eastern Massachusetts, south central Massachusetts, and the Connecticut River Valley, the Northeastern coastal forests are a mix of hardwood deciduous oak, maple, beech, hickory and coniferous pine trees. In the Berkshires and north central Massachusetts, the more boreal New England-Acadian forests prevail. These consists mainly of coniferous spruce and hemlock, occasional pine, and deciduous birch trees. Roughly since the Civil War, farms have reverted to woodland. Lumbering activity has decreased in recent decades, so the more undisturbed forests have reclaimed some characteristics of old growth.

The forests (and wooded suburbs) are home to a variety of invertebrate and vertebrate animal species. The state has an abundance of white-tailed deer, and there have been concerns about deer overpopulation because many of the deer's natural predators, such as wolves, have historically been hunted to extinction within Massachusetts. However, coyotes have been moving into Massachusetts to fill the ecological niche formerly occupied by wolves. Bears, wild turkey, and even moose have returned from northern refuges. In 1846 Thoreau traveled to Northern Maine to observe and write about moose, which he thought were well on the way to extinction. If he were alive today, he might find them almost within walking distance of Walden Pond.

Pollution, dams, and introduction of exotic species have decimated some native fish populations. Efforts to mitigate these problems and restore Atlantic salmon to the Connecticut River watershed have had very little success. The other widespread native salmonid, the brook trout, persists in cold upland streams, particularly above waterfalls and other barriers that exclude introduced brown and rainbow trout. American shad runs have retained at least a fraction of their former abundance, and smallmouth bass, sunfish, and pike populations are healthy enough to support angling.

Wetlands, including swamps and both salt- and fresh-water marshes, are important ecologically in Massachusetts. Many of the state's fish and bird species inhabit wetland environments.

The state's urban environments are partly wooded but also bear a heavy load of built structures and human environments that are not hospitable to many other species. At the same time, pollutants in waterways, mainly from urban sources, can be toxic to many species or may support algae and bacteria that lead to hypoxia and the death of aquatic animals. However, Greater Boston boasts extensive parklands, and efforts have been made in Massachusetts to reduce environmental pollution in both urban and rural parts of the state.

=== Settlement ===
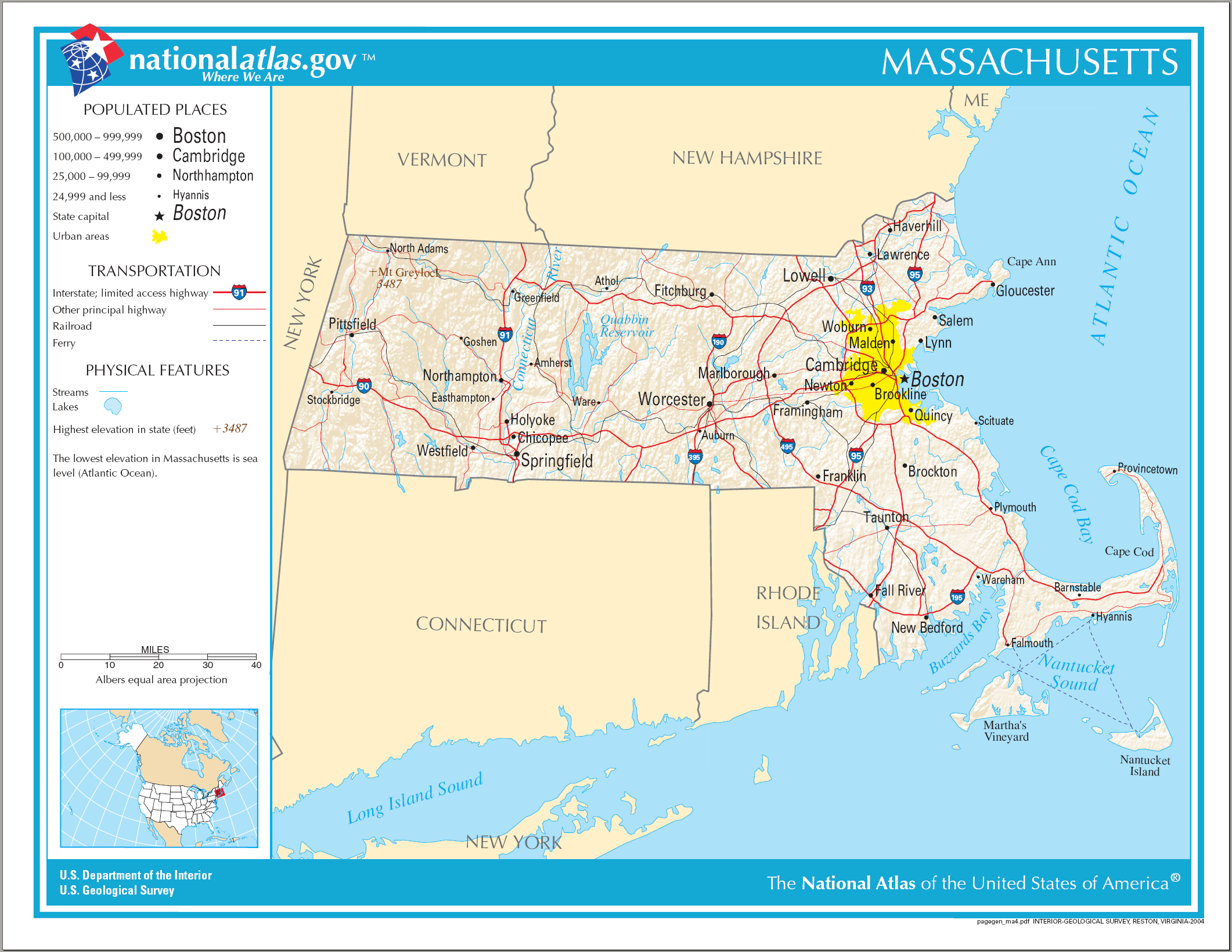
Map showing the primary cities, roads, and physical features of Massachusetts

The Northeast megalopolis extends into Massachusetts. It occupies most of eastern Massachusetts starting at Worcester as well as the Springfield-Holyoke-Northampton urbanization that joins Connecticut's Hartford-New Haven urbanization.

According to the definitions of the U.S. Office of Management and Budget (OMB), all of Massachusetts falls within a metropolitan statistical area (MSA), except for the offshore islands of Martha's Vineyard and Nantucket. According to 2005 Census estimates, 62% of the population of Massachusetts lives within the Boston MSA. Other Massachusetts metropolitan areas are the Worcester MSA (with 12% of the state's population), the Springfield MSA (11%), the Providence-Fall River-New Bedford MSA (9%), the Barnstable (Cape Cod) MSA (4%), and the Pittsfield MSA (2%).

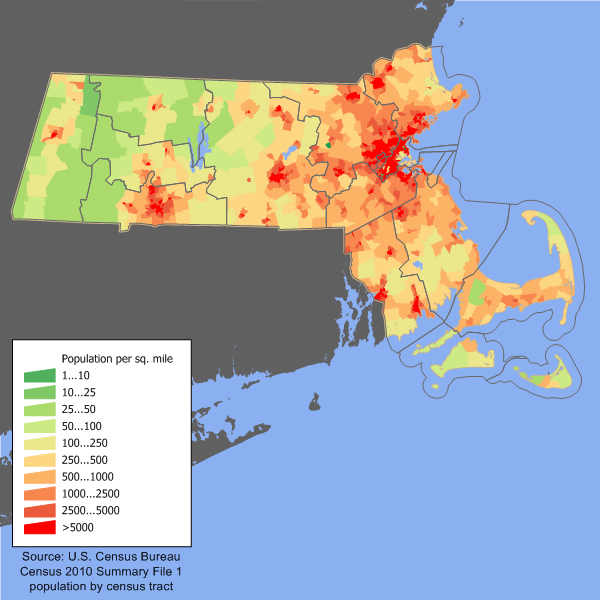
Massachusetts population density map

In each of these metropolitan areas, population is concentrated in a number of densely populated cities and towns. In the Boston MSA, for example, the City of Boston and a cluster of densely populated inner suburbs within the Route 128 belt account for more than half of the population of the metropolitan area. The older cities of Lawrence, Lowell, and Brockton lie outside this urban core but are also densely populated.

However, population is growing fastest in the outer peripheries of the state's metropolitan areas, where new housing construction is adding dwelling units. While the state as a whole shows little population growth, or even a population decline in some years due to a net loss from migration, the belt of towns along Interstate 495, near the western edge of the Boston MSA, shows steady population growth.

The Springfield and Worcester MSAs include some very thinly populated rural areas. In the Berkshires and in the hills west of Worcester are a number of towns with population densities below 40 per square mile (compared with the state average of 810 per square mile).

Although the U.S. Census Bureau prepares population estimates for MSAs, these statistical units are defined by county borders. Because Massachusetts counties are relatively large and may contain several urban centers, MSAs are an imprecise way to describe the state's urban clusters. For example, Lawrence, Lowell, and Brockton all have closer economic ties with neighboring towns than they do with one another. The Lowell region draws commuters from nearby New Hampshire who might not consider commuting all the way to Boston. Yet these areas are all part of the Boston MSA. Similarly, the cities of Leominster and Fitchburg form the core of a distinct urban cluster. Because they lie within Worcester County, however, they are considered part of the Worcester MSA.

=== Economic geography ===
A finer-grained statistical unit than the MSA is the New England City and Town Area, or NECTA. NECTAs take advantage of the administrative subdivision of the entire territory of Massachusetts and other New England states into towns and cities. (No part of Massachusetts is unincorporated county territory.) Each NECTA consists of a cluster of cities and towns defined by commuting patterns, which therefore correspond roughly to local labor markets. While the U.S. Census Bureau defines metropolitan areas by county boundaries, the U.S. Bureau of Labor Statistics (BLS) offers data on employment by NECTA.

By far the largest NECTA in Massachusetts is the Boston-Cambridge-Quincy (Greater Boston) NECTA, which covers eastern Massachusetts and extends into southern New Hampshire. This NECTA consists of a central Boston-Cambridge-Quincy NECTA Division, including the City of Boston and the surrounding cities and suburbs. The other satellite NECTA divisions in the Greater Boston NECTA are the Brockton-Bridgewater-Easton NECTA Division, the Framingham NECTA Division, the Haverhill-North Andover-Amesbury NECTA Division (extending well into southeastern New Hampshire), the Lawrence-Methuen-Salem NECTA Division (extending into southern New Hampshire), the Lowell-Billerica-Chelmsford (or Lowell) NECTA Division (extending into southern New Hampshire), the Lynn-Peabody-Salem NECTA Division, the Nashua NECTA Division (mainly in New Hampshire but including a few Massachusetts towns), and the Taunton-Norton-Raynham NECTA Division.

The other Massachusetts metropolitan NECTAs are the Barnstable Town NECTA (covering most of Cape Cod), the Leominster-Fitchburg-Gardner NECTA (in north central Massachusetts), the New Bedford NECTA (in southeastern Massachusetts), the Pittsfield NECTA (in far western Massachusetts), the Springfield NECTA (in the Pioneer Valley and extending into northern Connecticut), and the Worcester NECTA (in central Massachusetts, extending into northeastern Connecticut).

According to the BLS, total nonfarm employment in Massachusetts in 2005 was about 3.2 million. About half of these jobs were located in the Boston-Cambridge-Quincy NECTA Division, which lies entirely within Massachusetts, although this NECTA accounted for only about 43% of the state's population, according to 2005 Census estimates. This indicates either a higher labor participation rate in central Greater Boston or a surplus of commuters traveling to work from other parts of Massachusetts or neighboring states. Clearly, Greater Boston dominates the employment and economy of Massachusetts.

The other major centers of employment in Massachusetts are the Springfield and Worcester NECTAs. The Springfield NECTA accounts for slightly more than 10% of the jobs in Massachusetts, while the Worcester NECTA accounts for slightly less than 10% of the state's jobs. (Although both of these NECTAs extend into Connecticut, the towns that they include in Connecticut account for only a small portion of their population and, probably, of their employment).

In every Massachusetts NECTA, service-sector jobs far outnumber goods-producing (natural resources, construction, and manufacturing) jobs. Beyond this generalization, there are some differences in the employment and economic structures of the state's NECTAs and NECTA divisions.

In the far southeastern corner of Massachusetts, the Barnstable Town NECTA, nearly coterminous with the summer resort region of Cape Cod, has an atypical employment structure. It has the lowest share of employment in goods-producing jobs, which account for only 9.5% of its employment. Most of these jobs are in the construction sector. Manufacturing jobs account for only 3.3% of employment, compared with 9.6% for the state as a whole. On the other hand, the Cape Cod NECTA has the state's highest percentages of employment in retail trade (17.9%, versus 11.1% for the state) and in leisure and hospitality (16.9%, versus 9.1% for the state). These numbers reflect the continuing importance to Cape Cod of summer tourism.

The central Boston-Cambridge-Quincy division of the larger NECTA with the same name also has a relatively low percentage (6.7%) of manufacturing employment. Although this division accounts for about half of the state's total employment, it has only about a third of the state's manufacturing jobs. Its largest manufacturing subsector is the production of computers and electronic products (28% of the division's manufacturing jobs). This subsector is centered not in Boston's urban core, but in the suburbs to the north and west, along Route 128. The economy of central Greater Boston is even more biased toward service provision than that of the rest of the state.

The particular economic strength of central Greater Boston is knowledge-intensive activities. It accounts for 62.2% of the state's information sector jobs, and 66.0% of the jobs in the software-publishing subsector. Central Greater Boston has 68.8% of the state's financial sector jobs, and 92.5% of the jobs in the investment subsector. It has 69.3% of the state's jobs in management and technical consulting. Greater Boston is noted nationwide for its prestigious institutions of higher education, such as Harvard University and MIT, and the region is home to 77.8% of the state's higher-education employment. Together, the knowledge-intensive information, financial, professional and business services, and education sectors account for 36.6% of the jobs in central Greater Boston, compared with 28.8% of the jobs in Massachusetts as a whole and 23.2% for the United States as a whole.

The satellite NECTA divisions that lie on the periphery of the Greater Boston NECTA all have higher percentages of employment in manufacturing than central Greater Boston or than Massachusetts as a whole. Many of these satellite NECTA divisions are centered on historic manufacturing cities, such as Haverhill, Lawrence, Lowell, Lynn, and Brockton. The BLS breaks down manufacturing employment only for the Framingham and Lowell NECTA divisions, to the west and northwest of Boston, respectively. In both of these divisions, computer and electronics manufacturing accounts for well over half of manufacturing employment. Except for Lowell, these satellite NECTA divisions also have higher shares of employment in retail trade than central Greater Boston or Massachusetts as a whole. These divisions, located along the major highways radiating from Boston, are particularly rich in shopping centers and wholesalers. The Lowell and Framingham divisions have even higher shares of employment in the information sector than central Greater Boston. This reflects the strength of these regions in the software publishing and telecommunications subsectors. On the other hand, these satellite divisions have lower shares of employment in financial services and in health and education services than the state average, reflecting the regional dominance of central Greater Boston in these areas. The Framingham division, however, has the state's highest percentage of jobs in professional and business services (18.5% of employment versus 14.4% statewide), reflecting that region's strength in technology.

The New Bedford NECTA has the state's second-highest percentage (16.6%) of manufacturing employment. It has the state's lowest percentages of employment in the financial sector (3.1%) and in professional and business services (6.25%).

The Leominster-Fitchburg-Gardner NECTA has the state's highest percentage (17.8%) of manufacturing employment. It has by far the state's lowest percentage of employment (1.0%) in the information sector and the second-lowest rate of employment in professional and business services (6.73%). On the other hand, this NECTA has the state's highest percentage of employment (16.4%) in government.

The Worcester NECTA has a relatively high percentage (12.0%) of employment in manufacturing. Next to the Barnstable Town NECTA, it has a high percentage (14.9%) of employment in the healthcare sector. It has the lowest percentage of employment (8.7%) in the leisure and hospitality sector, reflecting the relative underdevelopment of its tourism industry.

The Springfield NECTA also has relatively high (12.9%) manufacturing employment. It has the state's largest percentage of employment in the transportation and utilities subsector (4.5%, versus 2.6% for the state as a whole). It has the second-highest percentage (16.3%) of jobs in government.

Despite the small size of the Pittsfield NECTA, its employment by sector is similar to that of Massachusetts as a whole for most sectors. However, it has the state's highest percentage of employment (20.4%) in the education and healthcare sector. It also has the second-highest share of employment (13.2%) in the leisure and hospitality sector. This reflects the importance of tourism in the Berkshires to the region's economy.

=== Watersheds ===
Major river systems in Massachusetts include:

- Hudson River (mostly in New York State)
  - Hoosic River
  - Kinderhook River
  - Bash Bish Brook
- Housatonic River
- Connecticut River
  - Westfield River
  - Deerfield River
  - Millers River
  - Chicopee River
  - Farmington River (mostly in Connecticut)
- Thames River (Connecticut)
  - Quinebaug River
    - French River
- Blackstone River
- Ten Mile River
- Taunton River
- Mystic River
- Charles River
- Neponset River
- Merrimack River
  - Nashua River
  - Concord River
  - Shawsheen River

Short streams and rivers and underground flows drain the coastal areas and islands on the Atlantic Ocean and Narragansett Bay.

== See also ==
- List of mountains in Massachusetts
- List of Massachusetts rivers
- Massachusetts#Geography
- Northern boundary of Massachusetts
