= Mount Ward =

Mount Ward may refer to:

- Mount Ward (Antarctica), mountain at the northeast end of Steeple Peaks, in western Palmer Land
- Mount Ward (Massachusetts), small summit in Marlboro, Massachusetts
- Mount Ward (New Zealand), mountain in the Southern Alps
- Mount Ward (North Masson Range), isolated peak in the southern part of the North Masson Range, Antarctica
- Mount Ward (Dominion Range) in the Dominion Range, Antarctica
