= Mount Pisgah (Massachusetts) =

Mountain in Massachusetts, United States

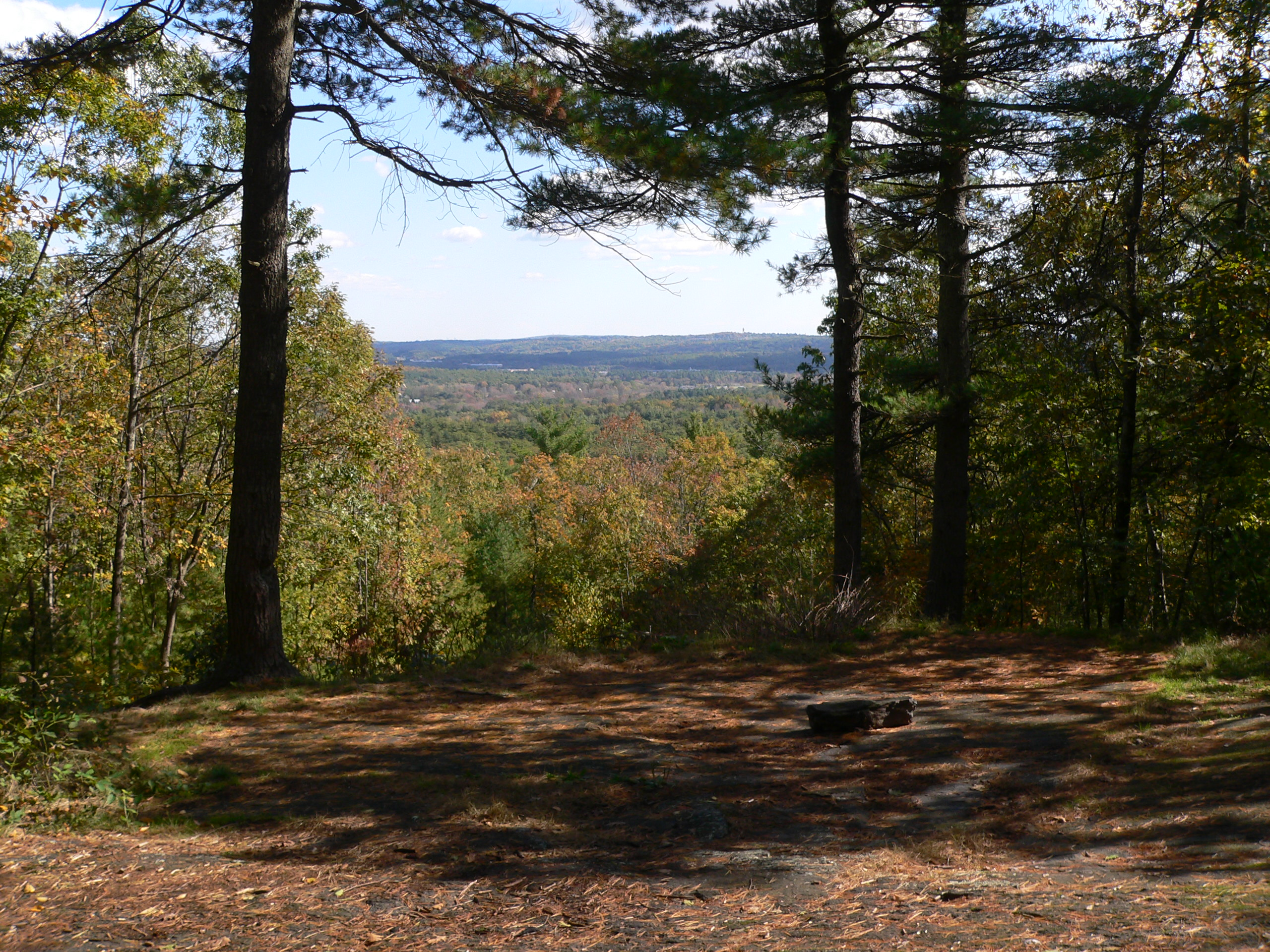
- View from the summit

Highest point
- Elevation: 715 ft (218 m)
- Coordinates: 42°21′55″N 71°39′28″W

Geography
- Location: Northborough, MA, U.S.
- Parent range: n/a
- Topo map: USGS Marlborough

Climbing
- Easiest route: Summit Trail via Mentzer Trail

Mount Pisgah is the highest point in Northborough, Massachusetts.

Features of the land include:

- Hardwood forest on former farmland
- Two scenic vistas to the east and Boston, MA skyscrapers visible on a clear day
- Connection to trails in Berlin, MA
- 92 acres (370,000 m^{2}) of land owned by MassWildlife

== Trails ==
Triangulation station at summit

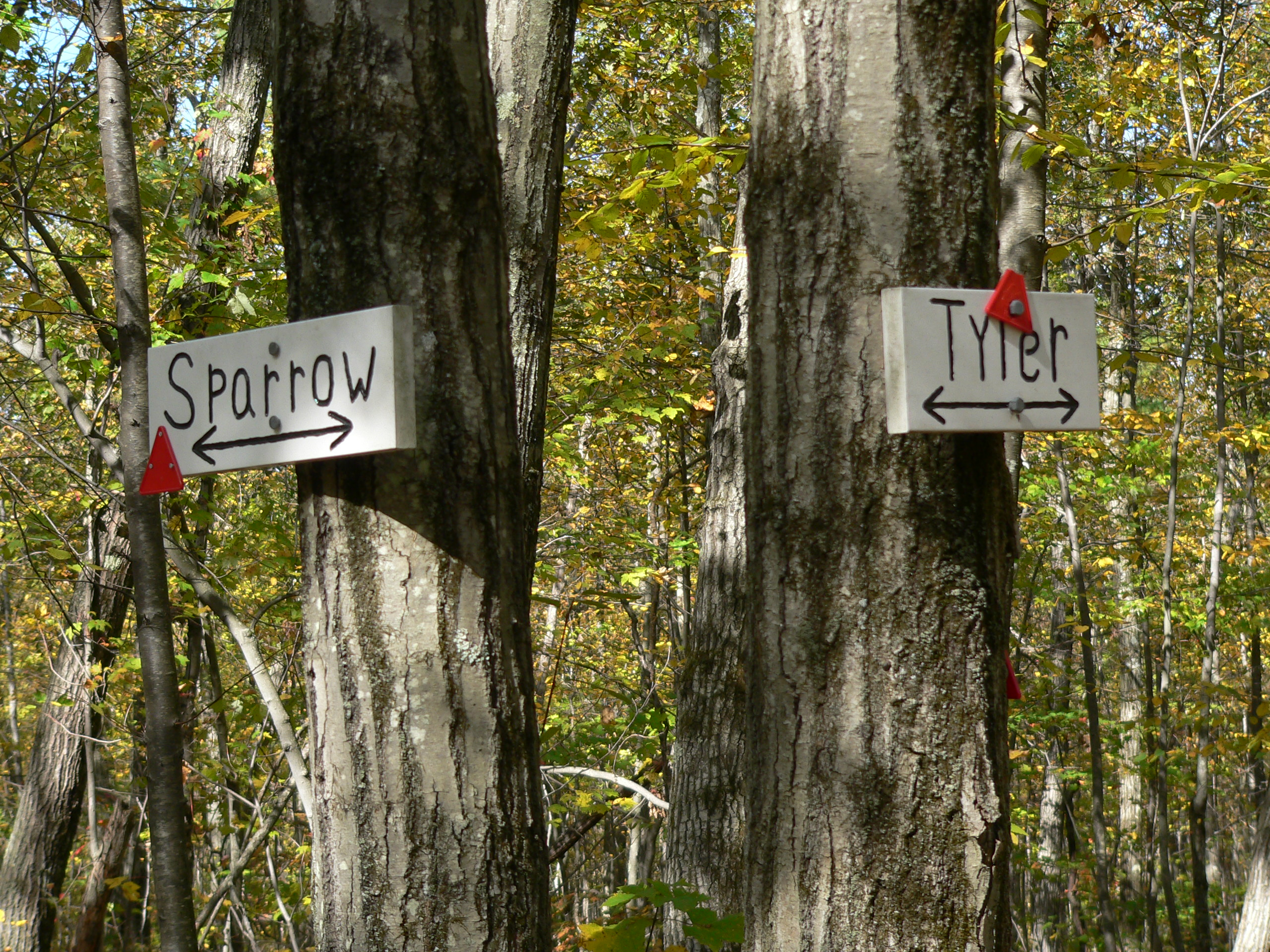

The summit is marked at the intersection of the Summit Trail and the Tyler Trail. Look for the cairn, the marker is to the right.

In June 2005, under a stewardship agreement with MassWildlife, the Northborough Trails committee took over maintenance of about three miles (5 km) of recently developed trails on the MassWildlife property located on the south end of Mt. Pisgah. The Fisher Trail and a small portion of the Vernal Pool Trail are on private property, and those land owners have agreed to allow the public's continued use of those trails, publication on a new map, and maintenance of the trails. All motorized vehicles, including ATVs, are prohibited from MassWildlife property.

In 2006 a new map of the Mt. Pisgah Conservation Area was completed by the Sudbury Valley Trustees. The map shows all the trails open to the public's use from the MassWildlife land on the south side of Mt. Pisgah to Linden Street in Berlin on the north side.

== Directions ==
From Northborough take Church Street at Mobil Station. Turn right onto Howard Street after the church on the hill. Bear left onto Green Street and continue to the top of Ball Hill. Turn right onto Smith Road. Conservation sign on right designates parking area for trails. About four miles (6 km) from center of town.
