= Berkshire Botanical Garden =

Botanical garden in Stockbridge, Massachusetts

- Location within Massachusetts
- Interactive map of Berkshire Botanical Garden
- Type: Botanical garden
- Location: Stockbridge, Massachusetts
- Coordinates: 42.3004°N 73.3364°W
- Area: 15 acres (6.1 ha)
- Established: 1934
- Website: berkshirebotanical.org

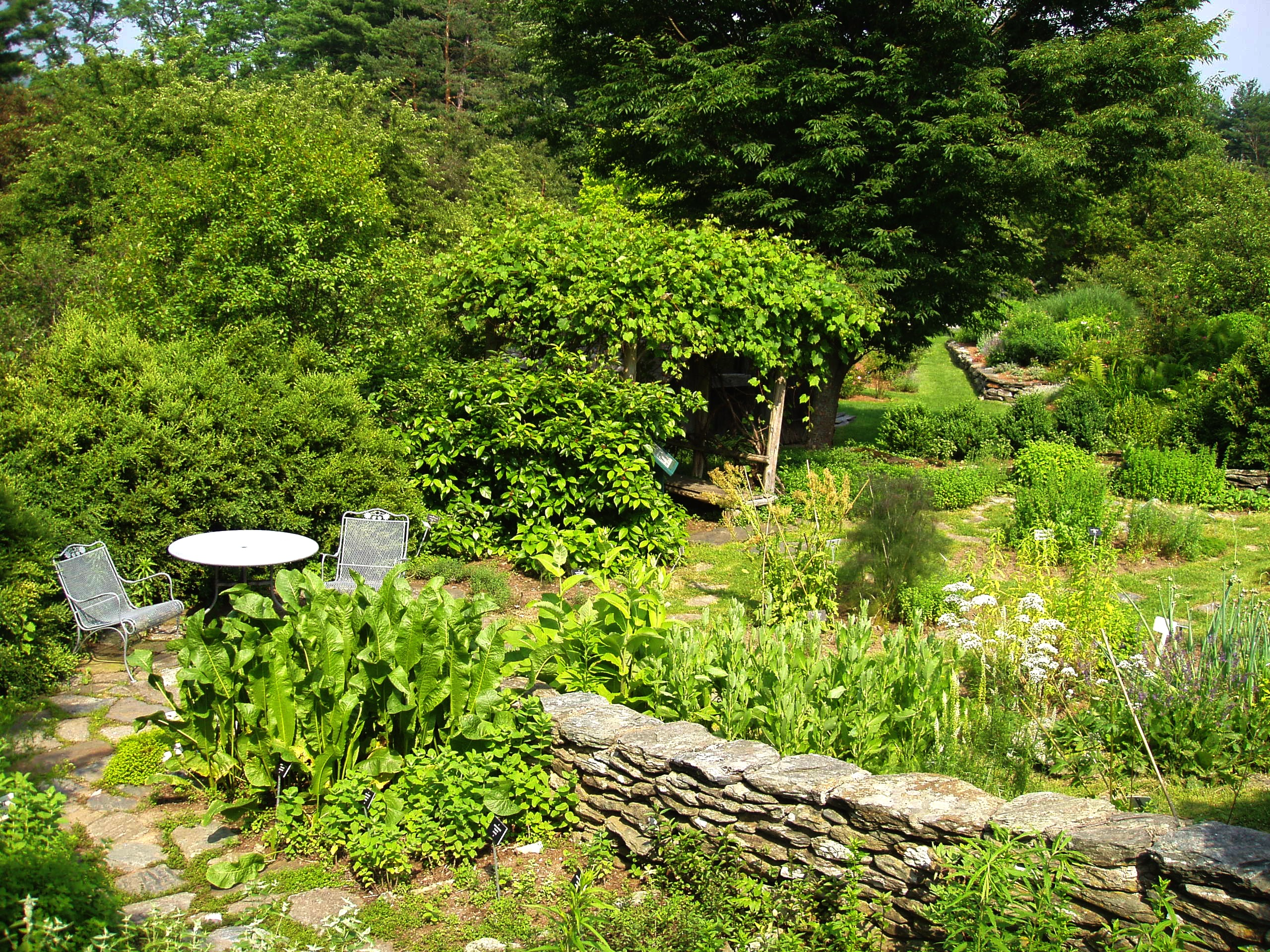
Berkshire Botanical Garden, view of the herb garden.

The Berkshire Botanical Garden, is a 24-acre (9.7 ha) botanical garden in Stockbridge, Massachusetts, United States. Its collections contain over 3,000 species and varieties, with an emphasis on plants that thrive in the Berkshires.

The Garden was founded in 1934 as the Berkshire Garden Center, and its public display gardens are among the oldest in the United States.

== See also ==
- List of botanical gardens in the United States
