= List of National Park Service areas in Massachusetts =

This list of National Park Service areas in Massachusetts describes the regions and properties of the state of Massachusetts in which the United States National Park Service (NPS) has an interest. Some of the sites are owned an operated by the NPS, while others, especially those covering significant geographic areas or involving multiple properties, may be only owned or operated in part by the NPS. In some cases, the NPS acts strictly in an advisory or coordinating capacity, and does not provide a services in the form of rangers, visitor centers, or maintenance that it normally provides for the properties it owns or operates.

Name	Type	Location	Description	Date established	Notes
Adams	National Historical Park	Quincy		1998	Most properties owned and operated by NPS.
Appalachian Trail	National Scenic Trail	Berkshire County		1968	Managed by NPS and other organizations.
Blackstone River Valley	National Heritage Corridor	Worcester County		1986	Extends into Providence County, Rhode Island. Visitor Center operated by Massachusetts Department of Conservation and Recreation; NPS operates in advisory capacity.
Boston African American	National Historic Site	Boston		1980	NPS acts in advisory role, and provides rangers.
Boston Harbor Islands	National Recreation Area	Boston and other nearby communities		1996	Most properties are state or private; NPS acts in advisory and coordinating role.
Boston	National Historical Park	Boston		1974	Some properties owned and operated by NPS.
Cape Cod	National Seashore	Barnstable County		1961	Property owned and operated by NPS.
Essex	National Heritage Area	Essex County		1996	Some properties owned and operated by NPS.
John F. Kennedy	National Historic Site	Brookline		1967	Property owned and operated by NPS.
Longfellow House–Washington's Headquarters	National Historic Site	Cambridge		1972	Property owned and operated by NPS.
Lowell	National Historical Park	Lowell		1978	Property owned and operated by NPS.
Minute Man	National Historical Park	Concord, Lincoln, and Lexington		1959	Property owned and operated by NPS.
New Bedford Whaling	National Historical Park	New Bedford		1996	Most properties are not owned or operated by NPS.
Frederick Law Olmsted	National Historic Site	Brookline		1979	Property owned and operated by NPS.
Quinebaug and Shetucket Rivers Valley	National Heritage Corridor	Worcester and Hampden Counties		1994	Extends into eastern Connecticut. NPS acts in advisory role.
Salem Maritime	National Historic Site	Salem		1938	Property owned and operated by NPS.
Saugus Iron Works	National Historic Site	Saugus		1968	Property owned and operated by NPS.
Springfield Armory	National Historic Site	Springfield			Joint state-NPS administration.
Westfield River	Wild and Scenic River	Berkshires			NPS acts in advisory role.
