= Saddle Ball Mountain =

Mountain in Massachusetts, United States

Highest point
- Elevation: 3,238 ft (987 m)
- Prominence: 207 ft (63 m)
- Coordinates: 42°37.059′N 73°11.379′W

Geography
- Location: Berkshire County, Massachusetts
- Parent range: Taconic Range

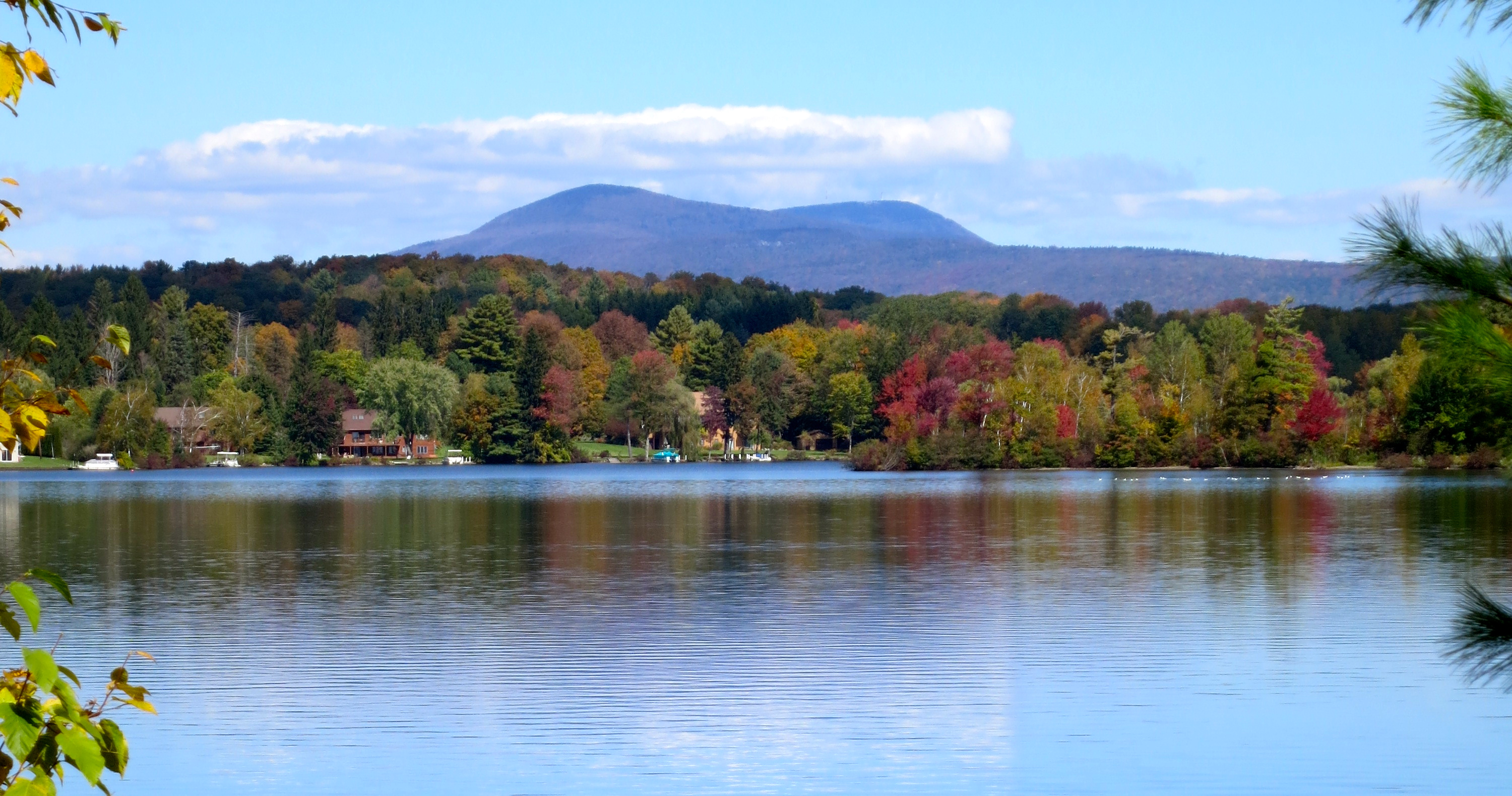
Saddle Ball Mountain from Pontoosuc Lake. The saddle is formed by Saddle Ball Mt. on the left side and Mt. Greylock on the right side of this photo.

Located in Berkshire County, Saddle Ball Mountain is the 2nd highest peak in the Commonwealth of Massachusetts.

Other than the Mount Greylock summit itself, Saddle Ball is the highest in a series of four outcroppings or lobes along the southern ridge of the Mount Greylock Range. The Appalachian Trail (AT) intersects and parallels this ridge as it heads north toward the summit of Mount Greylock.

The Albany 30 x 60 Quadrangle map locates the highest outcropping of Saddle Ball on the Appalachian Trail, about 0.2 to 0.3 miles north of its junction with the Jones Nose Trail.

== History / name ==
Mount Greylock was known to 18th century English settlers as Grand Hoosuc(k). In the early 19th century, Greylock was called Saddleback Mountain because of its appearance when viewed from the south. From this view, Saddle Ball Mountain is the cantle of the saddle and Mount Greylock the pommel. Saddle Ball Mountain itself was formerly known as Mt. Griffin during the early 1800s. By the mid-eighteen hundreds, the name controversy between Greylock versus Saddleback was resolved, leaving Saddle Ball Mountain as a remnant of Greylock’s earlier name. John Bascom’s 1907 monograph suggests its location along the ridge: “Mount Griffin still another two miles to the south and 220 feet lower than Greylock, which is 3,505 [sic]”.

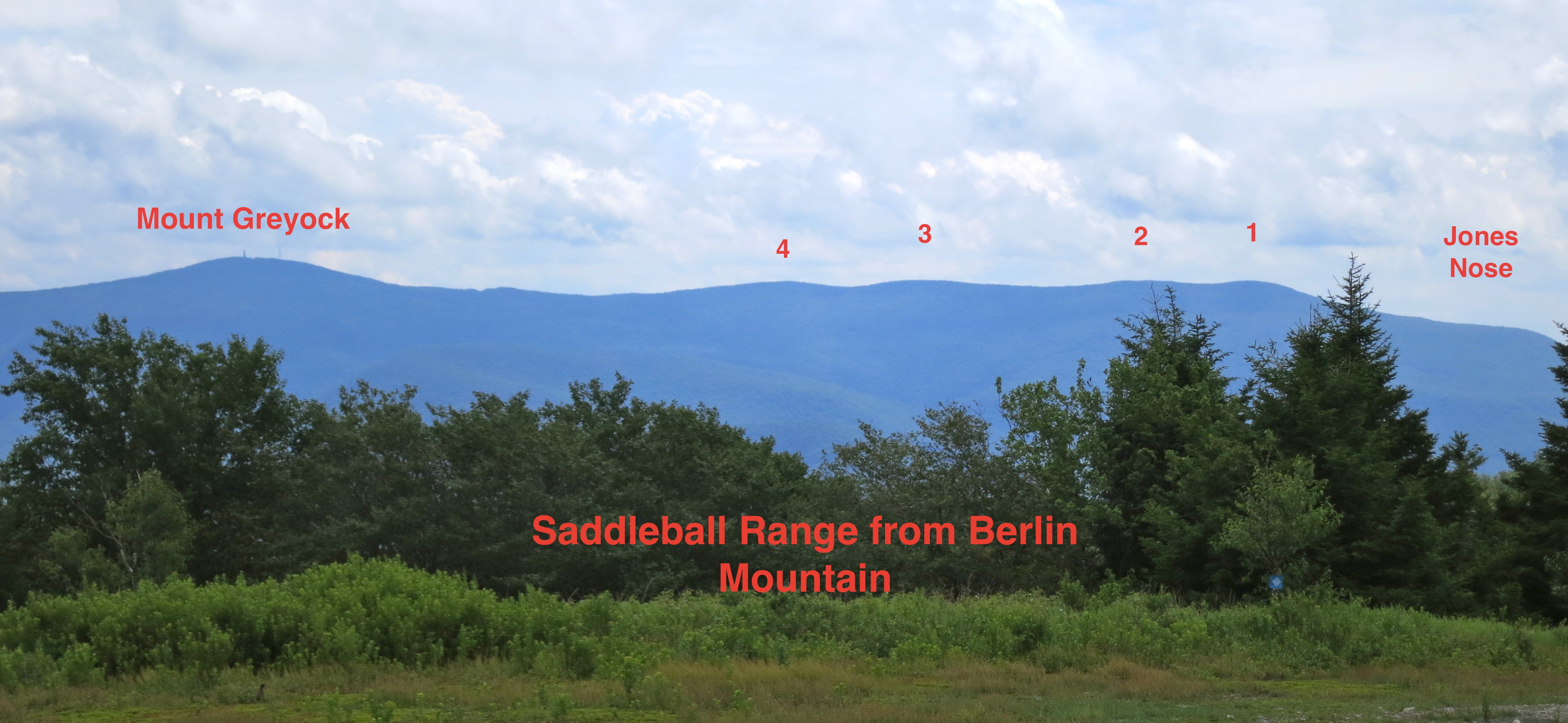
Profile of Saddle Ball Mountain and Mount Greylock, Berkshire County, Massachusetts.

There remains some controversy about the exact location of the highest peak.

- The 1988 Cheshire USGS 7.5 x 15 minute – 1:25,000 scale map locates Saddle Ball Mountain at #3 at 986 meters (3,235 feet) on the photo above.
- The 1989 Albany USGS 30 x 60 Quadrangle - 1:100,000 scale locates Saddle Ball Mountain at #1 at 987 meters (3,238 feet) on the photo above.
- The Mass. DCR Trail Map dated 2012 shows Saddle Ball Mountain at #1 at 3247 feet.
- In June and July 2013, two independent parties collected data using GPS and altimeter readings from all four Saddle Ball outcroppings. That information and historical data indicate that the southernmost Saddleball outcropping is the highest. The cairn on the west side of the Appalachian Trail is close to, if not the actual highpoint on Saddle Ball Mountain.

== Geology ==
Mount Greylock and the neighboring Taconic Mountains are composed predominantly of Ordovician phyllite, a metamorphic rock, overlain on younger layers of metamorphosed sedimentary rock, especially marble. Mount Greylock is the product of thrust-faulting, a tectonic process by which older rock is thrust up and above younger rock during periods of intense mountain building.

== Geography ==
Saddle Ball Mountain and Mount Greylock are part of an 11-mile-long by 4.5-mile-wide island-like range that runs in a north-south direction bordered by the Hoosac Range to the east, the Green Mountains to the north and the Taconic Mountains to the west. During the Pleistocene, 18,000 years ago, Mount Greylock and adjacent peaks were covered by ice sheets up to 1-kilometer in thickness. As the most recent ice cap receded, the Greylock Range was an island in the midst of Lake Bascom.

== Forests and ecology ==
Along the ridgeline of Greylock above 3000 feet between Mount Fitch on the north and the Saddle Ball series on the south is the only place in Massachusetts where a taiga-boreal or subalpine forest flourishes.

The Mount Greylock range is designated as an important bird area. There are a number of species of birds which breed in the taiga or boreal forests at the higher altitudes of the mountain, which are not normally found breeding in Massachusetts. These species include the blackpoll warbler and Bicknell's thrush.

== Recreation ==
Northbound hikers on either the Appalachian Trail or the Jones Nose Trail will pass over the southernmost and highest Saddle Ball about 0.2 to 0.3 miles north of the AT/Jones Nose junction. The high point is in the vicinity of a small cairn on the west side of the AT. The two most northerly Saddle Balls require a short but strenuous easterly bushwhack from the AT to reach the non-descript, forested high points.
