= Gibbs Mountain (Massachusetts) =

Mountain in Massachusetts, United States

Coordinates: 42°19′53″N 71°28′56″W

Gibbs Mountain is a small peak located in Framingham, Massachusetts, with an elevation of 512 feet (156 meters). It is located near Framingham's border with Marlborough. The peak was named after a local homesteader, Micah Gibbs. The summit is located in Callahan State Park and is traversed by the Red Tail Trail and Bay Circuit Trail, as well as the 3.7-mile (6.0 km) Gibbs Mountain Loop Trail. The summit is marked by a small pile of rocks in a small clearing.
