= Mount Surat =

Mountain in Massachusetts, United States

- Location within Massachusetts Location within the United States

Highest point
- Elevation: 154 ft (47 m)
- Coordinates: 41°29′42″N 70°44′26″W

Geography
- Location: Naushon Island, Massachusetts
- Topo map: USGS Naushon Island

Mount Surat is a mountain in Dukes County, Massachusetts, United States. It is located on Naushon Island 1.7 miles (2.7 km) west of Jobs Neck in the Town of Gosnold. Mount Cary is located southwest of Mount Surat.
