= Division of Fisheries and Wildlife (Massachusetts) =

The Massachusetts Division of Fisheries and Wildlife, sometimes referred to as MassWildlife, is an agency of the Massachusetts Department of Fish and Game, within the Executive Office of Energy and Environmental Affairs. The Massachusetts Division of Fisheries and Wildlife (DFW) is responsible for the conservation - including restoration, protection and management - of fish and wildlife resources for the benefit and enjoyment of the public. MassWildlife was founded as a state fisheries commission in 1866 in response to citizen concerns about the loss of Atlantic salmon to dams and pollution. The agency's activities are mainly supported by revenue from the sale of hunting, trapping and fishing licenses, stamps and permits. Returns from federal taxes on hunting and fishing equipment; various bond initiatives (primarily for land purchase. Additional funding is derived from voluntary donations from businesses, conservation organizations, and individuals.

The conservation - including protection, restoration, and management - of Massachusetts' fauna and flora is the statutory responsibility of MassWildlife. Specifically, MassWildlife's charge is the stewardship of all wild amphibians, reptiles, birds, mammals, and freshwater and diadromous fishes in the state, as well as endangered, threatened, and special concern species, including native wild plants and invertebrates. This responsibility is established and articulated in the Constitution and General Laws of Massachusetts. MassWildlife is overseen by a seven-member Fisheries and Wildlife Board appointed by the Governor. Under Chapter 21, the Board supervises and controls the agency, having the authority to make regulations, set policy, and oversees personnel appointments. The Board meets monthly and holds public hearings as part of the regulatory process. All meetings and hearings are posted on the agency website as well as at agency facilities.

MassWildlife manages over 100 Wildlife Management Areas (WMA) and 13 wildlife sanctuaries with responsibility for over 200,000 acres (810 km^{2}) of lands and waters. WMAs are all open to hunting, fishing, trapping and other outdoor recreation activities. Sanctuaries are more restrictive—camping, hunting, fishing and trapping is prohibited.

MassWildlife runs fish hatcheries in Sandwich, Belchertown, Montague and Sunderland. Rainbow, brown, brook and tiger trout are raised to stock various state waters.

Mass Wildlife's website has information on regulations and permits for hunting, fishing, trapping and recreational land use. In addition there are maps of wildlife management locations and information on wildlife viewing. The agency also publishes the quarterly magazine Massachusetts Wildlife which has excellent photos and articles on state flora and fauna. MassWildlife also publishes the following:

- Booklets
  - Field Guide to Animals in Vernal Pools
  - Wildlife Sanctuaries
  - Living Waters
  - Town Core Habitat Reports, 2004
  - Classification of the Natural Communities of Massachusetts Reprinted 2004
- Maps/Atlases
  - Natural Heritage Rare Species & Habitat Atlas
  - Town Core Habitat Maps
  - Aerial Photo Survey of Potential Vernal Pools in Massachusetts (CD Viewer)
  - Pond Maps
  - Wildlife Management Area Maps
- Posters
  - Living Waters Poster
  - BioMap Poster
- Flyers/Lists
  - Landowner Incentive Program
  - Rare Species List
