= Waitt's Mountain =

Summit in Massachusetts

Waitts Mountain
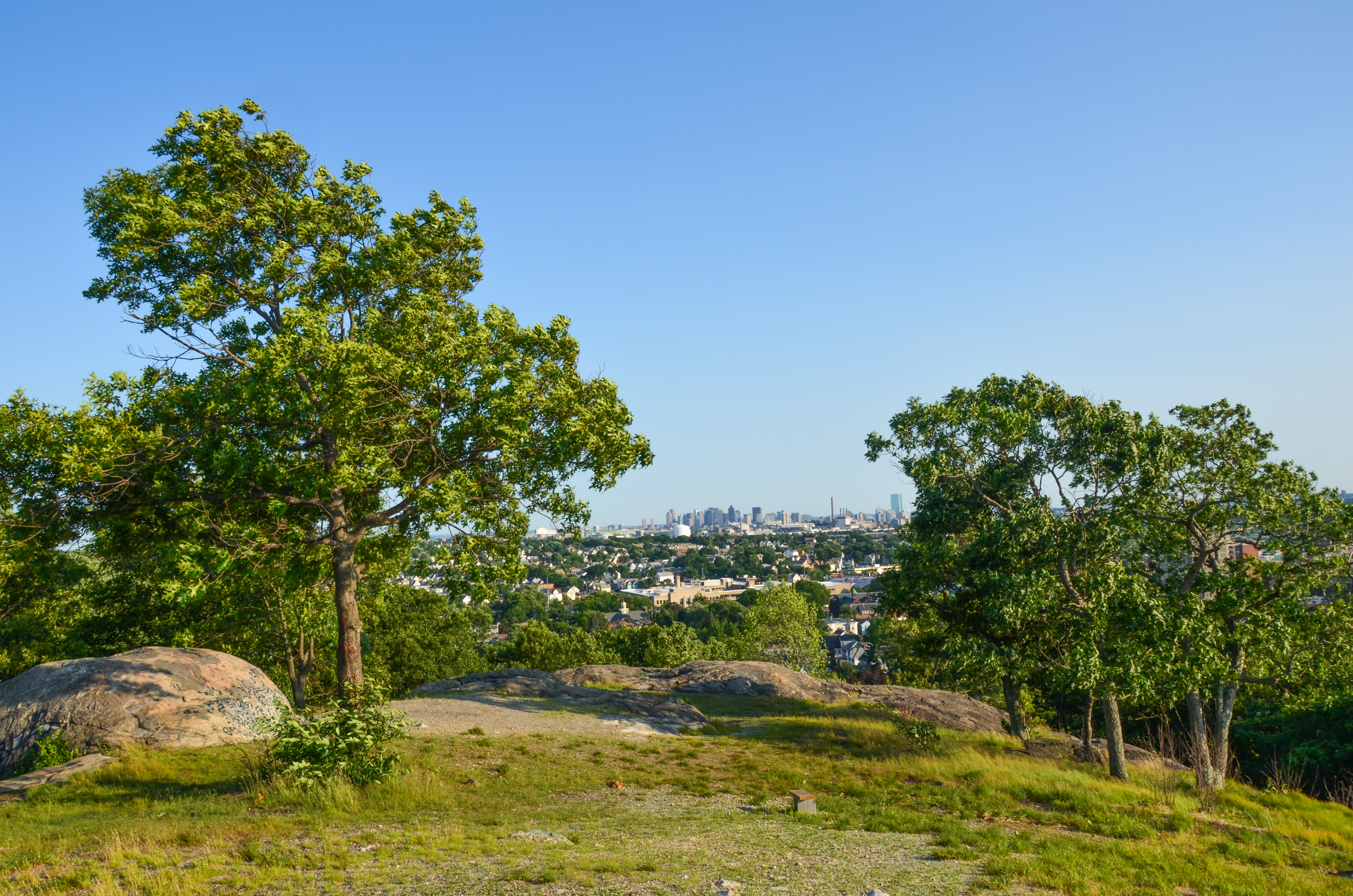
- Boston as seen from Waitt's Mountain

Highest point
- Elevation: 217 ft (66 m) NGVD 29
- Coordinates: 42°26′00″N 71°03′56″W

Geography
- Location: Malden, Middlesex County, Massachusetts, U.S.
- Topo map: USGS Boston North

Climbing
- Easiest route: Hike

Waitts Mountain is a summit in Malden, Middlesex County in the state of Massachusetts. It was named by the United States Geological Survey in 1894.

== Background ==
Waitt's Mountain also has a historic park. It has the tallest point in Malden, with expansive views of the Boston skyline. In World War I it was home to a Fresh Air Camp, and in World War II had gun batteries. During the Battle of Bunker Hill, people observed the battle from Waitt's Mount.
