= Berkshires =

Region in the Northeastern United States

- Berkshire Hills, Berkshire Mountains, The Berks
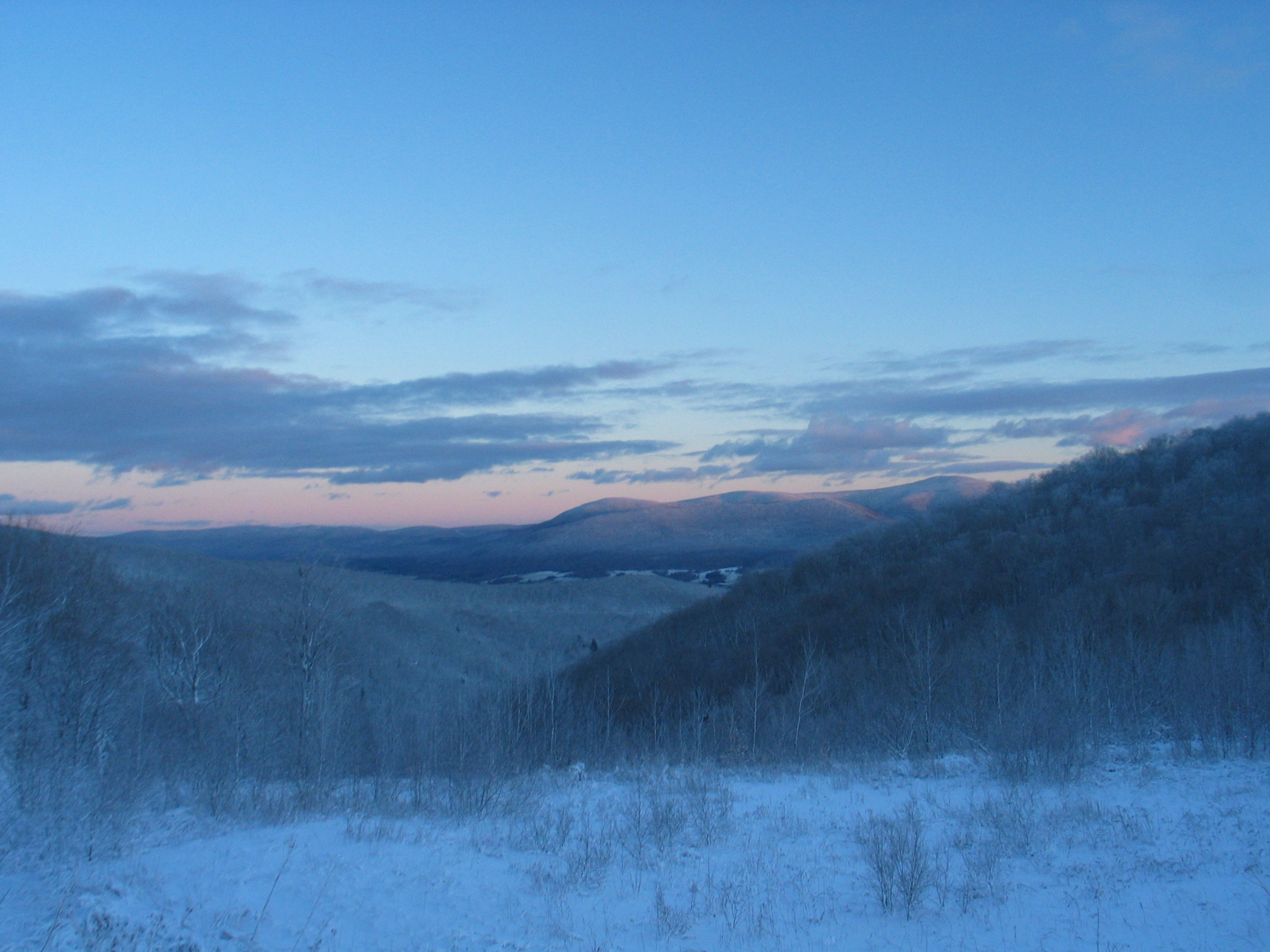

Highest point
- Peak: Mount Greylock
- Elevation: 3,491 ft (1,064 m)
- Coordinates: 42.711111°N 73.019722°W

Dimensions
- Length: 98 mi (158 km) north–south

Geography
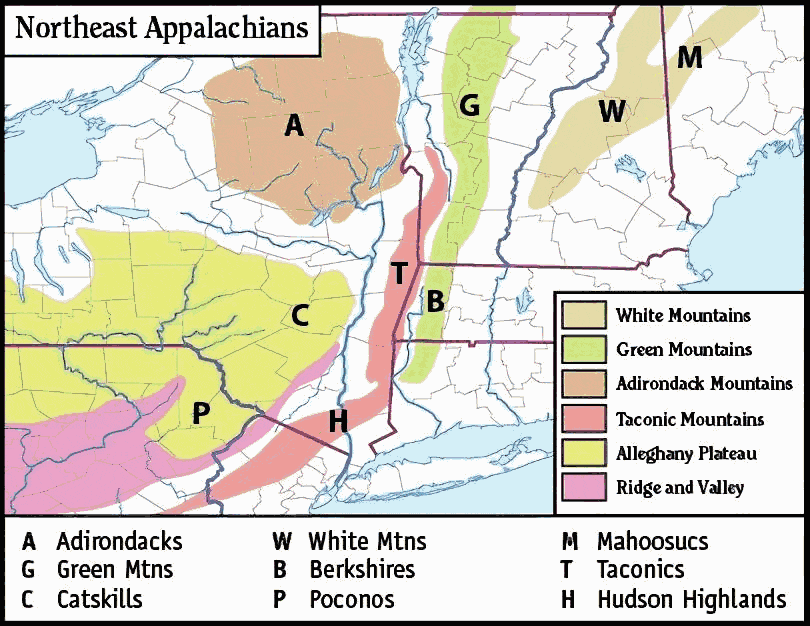
- Berkshires labeled as B
- Country: United States
- States: Massachusetts; Connecticut
- Range coordinates: 42°10′0.325″N 73°8′58.385″W

Geology
- Rock type: Metamorphic

The Berkshires (locally /ˈbɜːrkʃɪərz, -ʃərz/) are highlands located in western Massachusetts and northwestern Connecticut in the United States. Generally, "Berkshires" may refer to the range of hills in Massachusetts that lie between the Housatonic and Connecticut Rivers. Highlands of northwest Connecticut may be seen as part of the Berkshires and sometimes called the Northwest Hills or Litchfield Hills. The segment of the Taconic Mountains in Massachusetts and New York is often considered a part of the Berkshires and considered part of the cultural region, although they are geologically separate and are a comparatively narrow range along New York's eastern border.

Also referred to as the Berkshire Highlands, Berkshire Hills, Berkshire Mountains, and Berkshire Plateau, the region enjoys a vibrant tourism industry based on music, arts, and recreation. Geologically, the mountains are a subrange of the Appalachian Mountains.

Until 1933, the region was served by the Berkshire Street Railway, which once connected most cities and towns of the region to Springfield and all three neighboring states. The Berkshires were named among the 12 Last Great Places by The Nature Conservancy.

== Definition ==
The term "The Berkshires" has overlapping but non-identical political, cultural, and geographic definitions.

=== Political ===
Politically, Berkshire County, Massachusetts, was formed as a governmental unit in 1761. It includes the western extremity of the state, with its western boundary bordering New York and its eastern boundary roughly paralleling the watershed divide separating the Connecticut River watershed from the Housatonic River and Hoosic River watersheds. However, like most other counties in Massachusetts, the active governmental role of Berkshire County has been abolished, so has no legal or governmental function.

=== Cultural ===
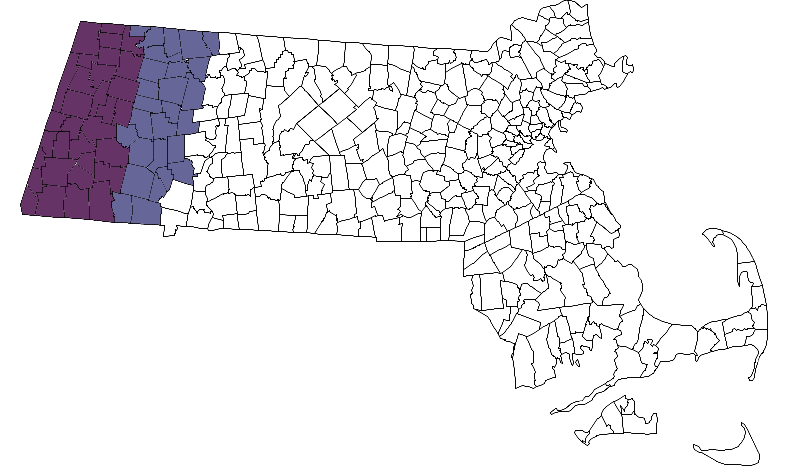
The Berkshires region of Massachusetts, with Berkshire County in dark purple

Culturally, the term "Berkshires" includes all of the highland region in western Massachusetts west of the Connecticut River and lower Westfield River. The cultural region also includes the Taconic Mountains bordering New York, which are geologically distinct from the Berkshires orogeny. Southwest Vermont and the Taconic region of New York are occasionally grouped with the Berkshires cultural region.

Sir Francis Bernard, the royal governor (in office 1760–1769), named the area "Berkshire" to honor his home county in England. In the present, the name of the modern American region is pronounced differently (BERK-sheer, -shər) to the modern English County (BARK-sheer, -shər).

=== Geographic ===
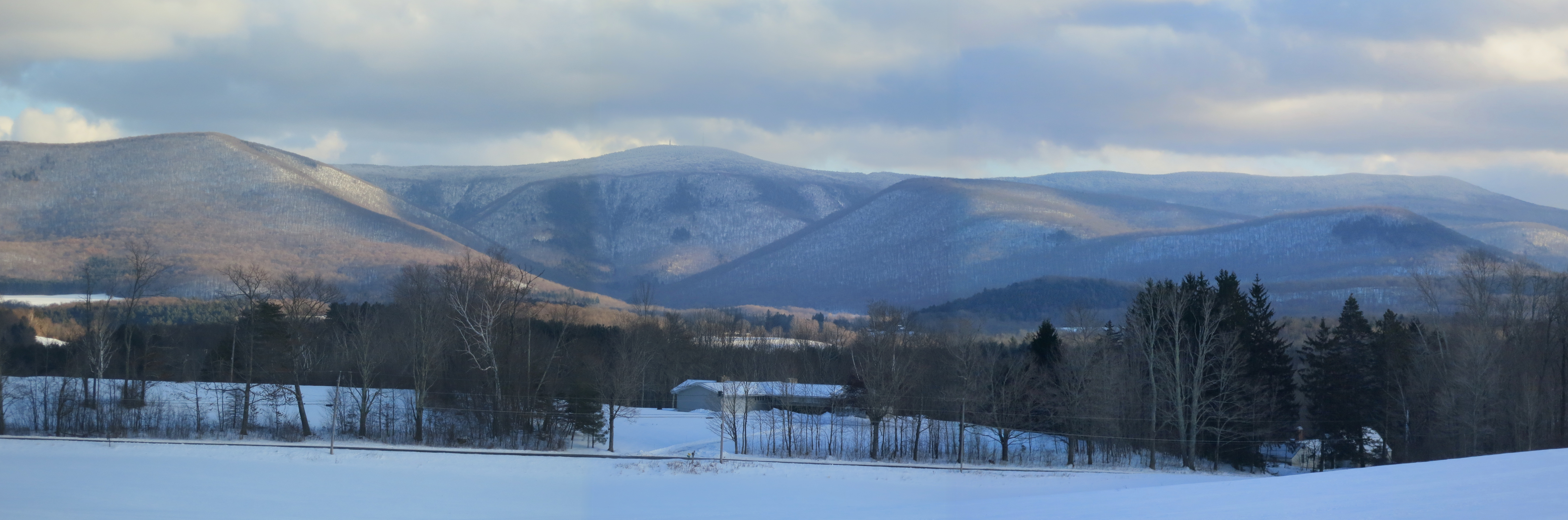
The Mount Greylock massif seen from the west in winter, with the deep valley known as "The Hopper" directly below the summit

Geologically and physically, the Berkshires are the southern continuation of the Green Mountains of Vermont, distinct from them only by their lower average elevation and by virtue of what side of the border they fall on. In physical geography, the Berkshires extend from the Housatonic River and Hoosic River valleys in western Massachusetts, to the Connecticut River valley in north-central Massachusetts, and to the foot of the lower Westfield River valley in south-central Massachusetts. In Connecticut, where they are referred to as the Litchfield Hills, they extend east from the upper Housatonic River valley in the northwest part of the state.

Geologically, the Berkshires are bordered on the west by the Taconic Mountains, the south by the Hudson Highlands, and to the east, they are bordered by the Metacomet Ridge. They are on the average 1,000 ft (300 m) lower and less prominent than the Green Mountains of Vermont, and form a broad, dissected plateau punctuated by hills and peaks and cut by river valleys. The Berkshires topography gradually diminishes in profile and elevation from west to east and from north to south, except where rivers have cut deep gorges and sharp bluff faces into the Berkshire plateau.

==== Formation ====
The Berkshires and related Green Mountains formed over half a billion years ago when Africa collided with what is now North America, pushing up the Appalachian Mountains and forming the bedrock of the Berkshires. Erosion over hundreds of millions of years wore these mountains down to the hills that we see today.

==== Elevation ====
The average regional elevation of the Berkshires ranges from about 700 to 1,200 feet (210 to 370 m). One of the high points is Spruce Mountain, at 2,710 feet (830 m). The highest point in the Berkshires is Mount Greylock, at 3,491 feet (1,064 m).

==== Rivers ====
The Housatonic River, Hoosic River, Westfield River, and Deerfield River watersheds drain the Berkshire region in Massachusetts; in Connecticut the main river drainages are the Farmington River, the Naugatuck River, the Shepaug River, and the Housatonic River.

==== Counties ====
The Berkshire hills run through:

- Berkshire County, Massachusetts (far Western Massachusetts)
- Hartford County, Connecticut (Hartland, Granby)
- Franklin County, Massachusetts (Leyden, Colrain, Shelburne, Conway, Charlemont, Heath, Buckland, Hawley, Ashfield, Rowe, Monroe)
- Hampden County, Massachusetts (Tolland, Chester, Granville, Blandford, Russell, Montgomery)
- Hampshire County, Massachusetts (Chesterfield, Goshen, Williamsburg, Westhampton, Huntington, Worthington, Cummington, Middlefield, Plainfield)
- Litchfield County, Connecticut (County South of Massachusetts border)

==== Municipalities ====
The largest municipalities associated with the Berkshires cultural region include Pittsfield, North Adams, Great Barrington, Williamstown, Stockbridge, Lee, and Lenox, Massachusetts.

== History ==
During the American Revolution a Continental Army force under Henry Knox brought captured cannons from Fort Ticonderoga by ox-drawn sleds south along the west bank of the Hudson River from the fort to Albany, where he then crossed the Hudson. Knox and his men continued east through the Berkshires and finally arrived in Boston. This feat, known as the "Noble train of artillery", was accomplished in the dead of winter, 1775–1776. The Berkshires is also home to Hancock Shaker Village, which is the oldest continuously working farm in the Berkshires of Western Massachusetts. Hancock Shaker Village is a landmark destination of 750 acres (300 ha), 20 historic Shaker buildings, and over 22,000 Shaker artifacts. On the National Historic Register, it is one of the most comprehensively interpreted Shaker sites in the world.

== Ecology ==
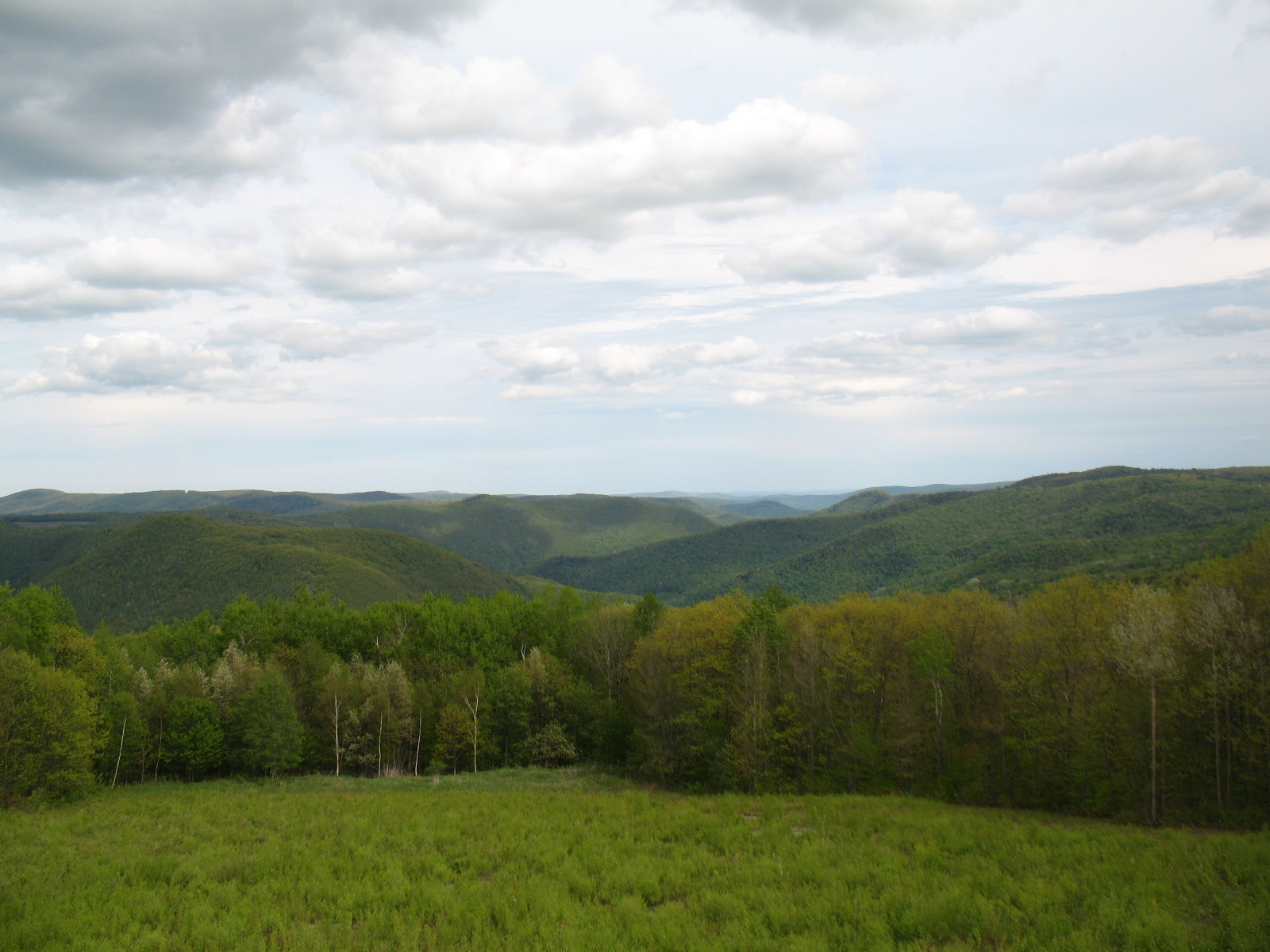
A view of the Berkshires from near North Adams, Massachusetts

The Berkshires lie within the New England/Acadian forests ecoregion.

Similarly, the U.S. Environmental Protection Agency in Massachusetts (Griffith et al. 1994) has defined six ecoregions within this area: Taconic Mountains, Western New England Marble Valleys, Lower Berkshire Hills, Berkshire Highlands, Vermont Piedmont, and Berkshire Transition. Each region is distinct from the others, providing a unique habitat assemblage.

Much of the Hoosic and Housatonic River valleys have underlying bedrock limestone and marble which contribute to calcareous wetlands unique in Massachusetts. The alkaline pH waters support a diversity of plants and animals intolerant of more acidic waters, some of which are state-listed rare or endangered. Combined with the rich mesic forests ranging from the northern hardwood to the taiga or sub-alpine, the Berkshires have a valuable, biologically diverse ecosystem.

The classic study of the vegetation of the Berkshire Highlands was Egler's 1940 monograph, covering the flora of an area stretching roughly from Pittsfield, Massachusetts, in the west to Hatfield, Massachusetts, in the east, and from Goshen, Connecticut, in the south to the Vermont border in the north.

Today, many organizations are making efforts to preserve and manage this region for biological diversity and sustainable human development.

== Tourism ==
The Berkshires have numerous shops, motels, hotels, museums, and trails, including part of the Appalachian Trail, large tracts of wilderness and parks Berkshire Botanical Garden and Hebert Arboretum The area includes Bash Bish Falls, the tallest waterfall in Massachusetts.

The Berkshire region is noted as a center for the visual and performing arts, many institutions which are associated with Williams College. The art museums include the Norman Rockwell Museum, the Clark Art Institute, the Massachusetts Museum of Contemporary Art (Mass MoCA), Berkshire Museum, Hancock Shaker Village, and the Williams College Museum of Art (WCMA). Performing-arts institutions in the Berkshires include Tanglewood Music Center and Boston University Tanglewood Institute in Lenox, the summer home of the Boston Symphony Orchestra; the Bang on a Can Summer Festival for contemporary music in North Adams; Shakespeare & Company in Lenox; summer stock theatre festivals such as the Williamstown Theatre Festival in Williamstown, Barrington Stage Company in Pittsfield, the Berkshire Theatre Festival in Stockbridge, and Berkshire Playwrights Lab in Great Barrington; and America's first and longest-running dance festival, Jacob's Pillow, in the town of Becket.

== See also ==
- BerkShares
- Berkshire, England
- Famous Berkshire Cottages:
  - Edith Wharton's The Mount
  - Naumkeag
  - Ventfort Hall Mansion and Gilded Age Museum
- Geography of Massachusetts
- List of mountains in Massachusetts
- Massachusetts College of Liberal Arts
