= Mount Cary =

Mountain in Massachusetts, United States

- Location within Massachusetts Location within the United States

Highest point
- Elevation: 102 ft (31 m)
- Coordinates: 41°29′23″N 70°44′53″W

Geography
- Location: Naushon Island, Massachusetts
- Topo map: USGS Naushon Island

Mount Cary is a mountain in Dukes County, Massachusetts. It is located on Naushon Island 0.8 miles (1.3 km) north of Tarpaulin Cove in the Town of Gosnold. Mount Surat is located northeast of Mount Cary.
