= Mount Fitch (Massachusetts) =

Mountain in Massachusetts, United States

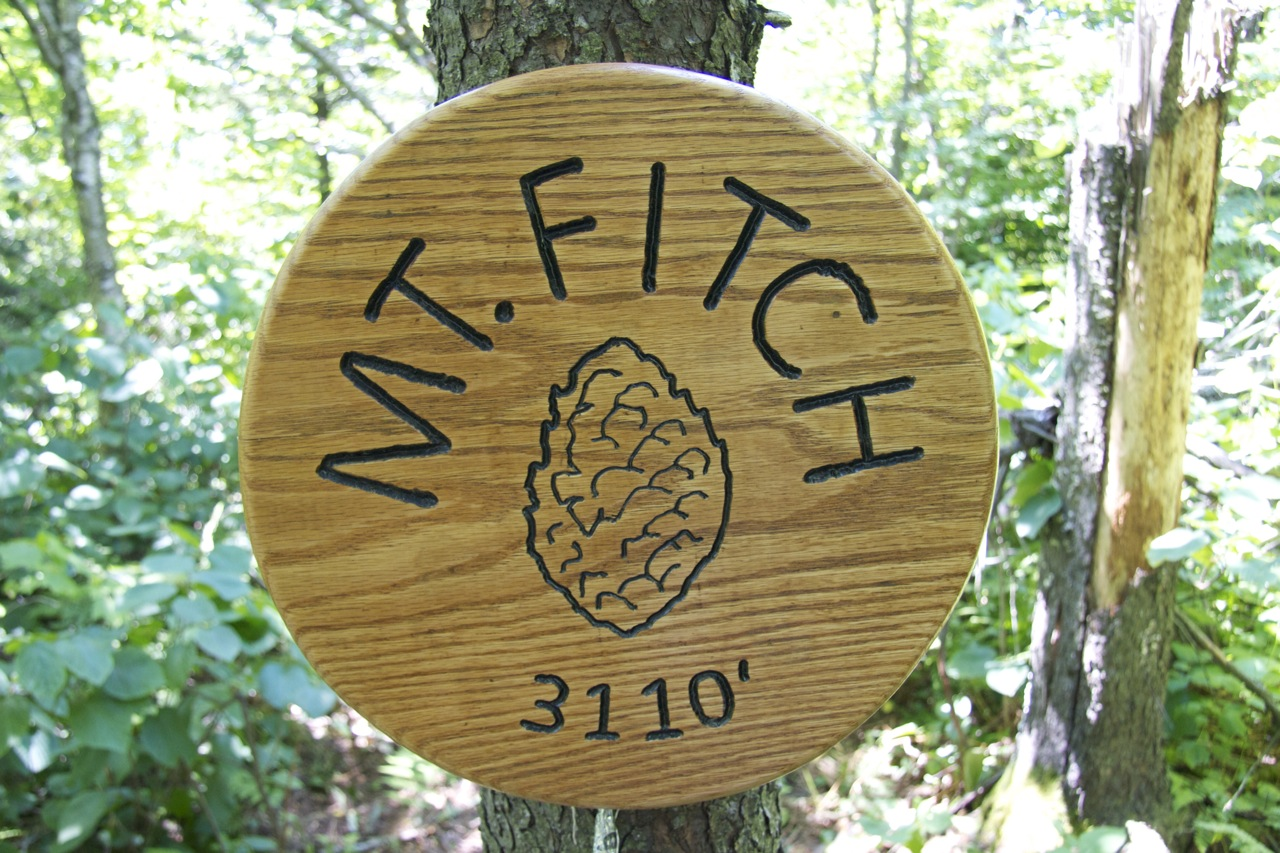
- Sign at the summit of Mount Fitch, photographed in July, 2012

Highest point
- Elevation: 3,104 ft (946 m)
- Prominence: 103 ft (31 m)
- Parent peak: Mount Greylock
- Coordinates: 42°39′20.89″N 73°9′35.83″W

Geography
- Location within Massachusetts
- Location: Berkshire County, Massachusetts, U.S.
- Parent range: Taconic Range
- Topo map(s): USGS Williamstown, Massachusetts

Mount Fitch is the third-highest peak in the Commonwealth of Massachusetts at 3,104 feet (946 m). It is located on the ridge between Mount Greylock at 3,489 feet (1,063 m) to its south and Mount Williams at 2,951 feet (899 m) to its north. The peak sits in the northwest corner of the Town of Adams (originally known as the Town of East Hoosac) in Berkshire County. The forested summit is approximately 123 yards (112 m) due west of a local high-point on the Appalachian Trail. Mount Fitch does not meet the Appalachian Mountain Club's prominence criterion of 200 vertical feet of separation from adjacent peaks as outlined in New England's Four-thousand footers list. Currently there is no side-spur trail or signage directing a hiker to the summit of Mt. Fitch from the Appalachian Trail; however, there is a wooden placard at the summit itself (pictured at right). The top is infrequently visited by hikers due to its anonymity, the bushwhack necessary to reach the top and the viewless summit.

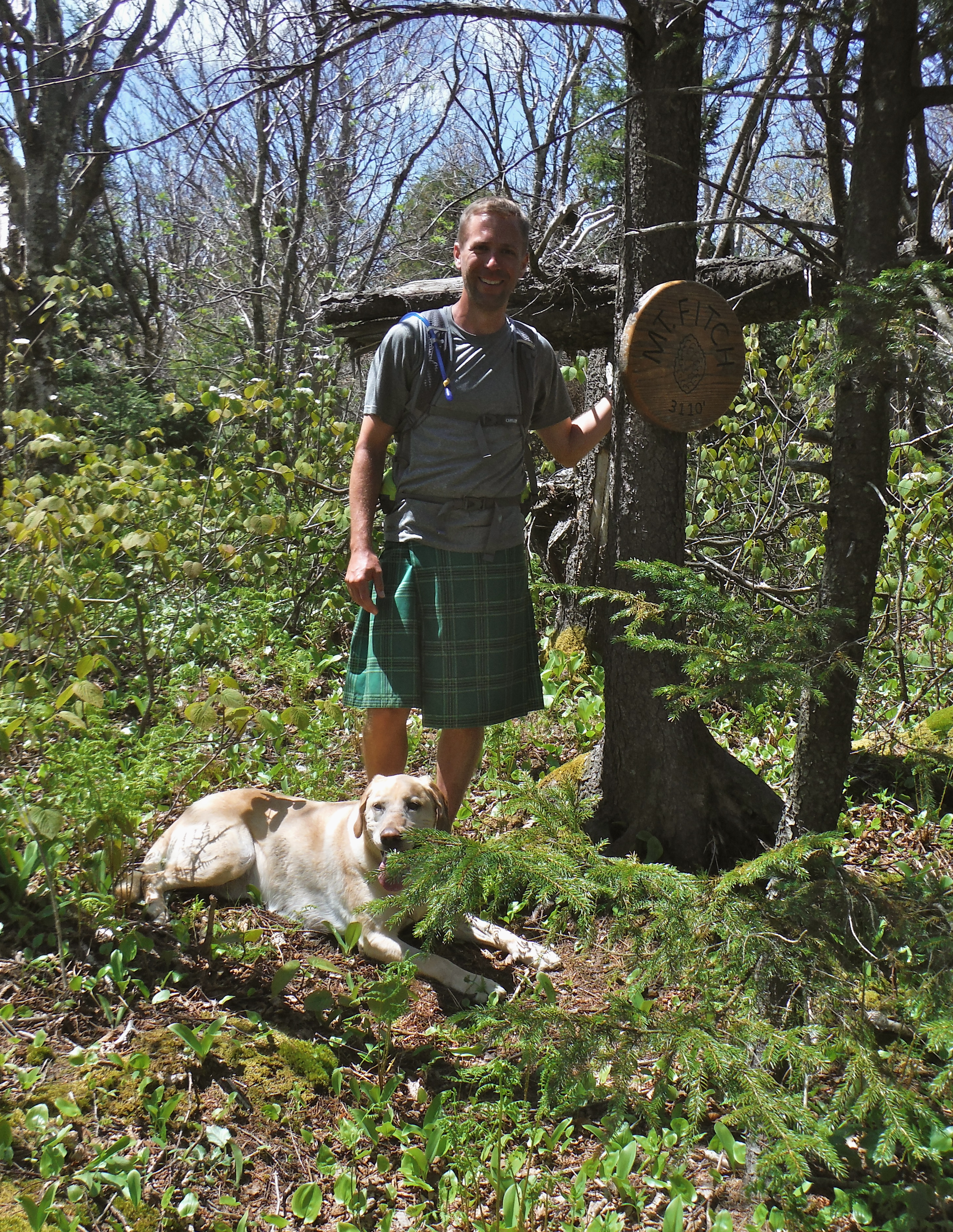
An occasional hiker reaches the top amongst the pucker brush

The peak is named for Ebenezer Fitch, who served as president of Williams College in nearby Williamstown, Massachusetts from 1793–1815. The name and geographic significance of the peak were disparaged by R.R.R. Brooks in his 1953 history of Williamstown, "[I]t is doubtful whether more than one resident in ten knows Mt. Williams from Mt. Fitch".

In 1947, local residents Dr. Joseph Wilk and Bartlett Hendricks terminated clear cutting the summit of Mount Fitch, which remains overgrown to this date.

== Geography, geology and ecology ==
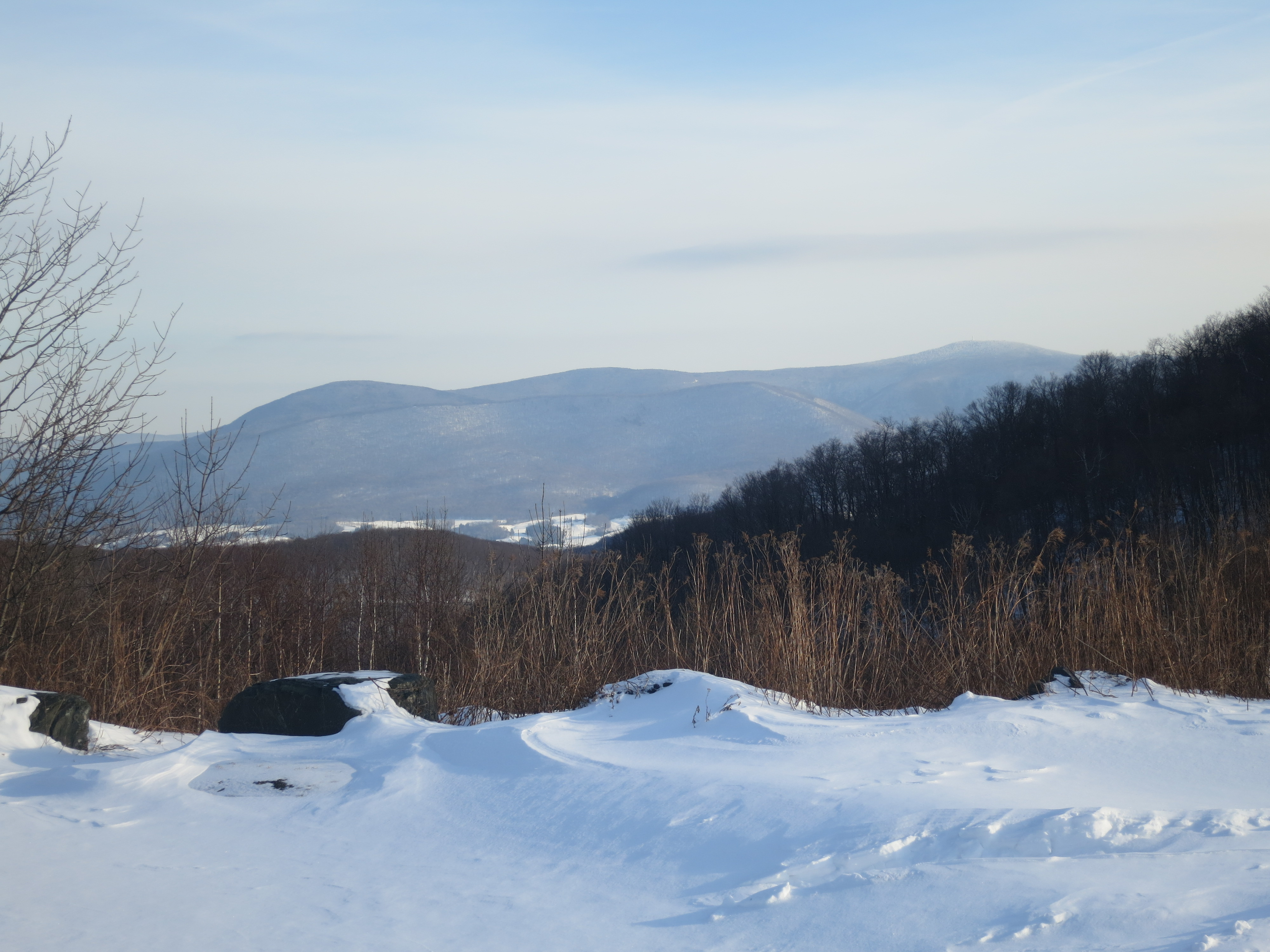
The northern section of the Greylock Range seen from Petersburg Pass includes (from left to right): Mt. Williams (2,951 ft.), Mt. Fitch (3,110 ft.), Mt. Prospect (2,677 ft. - below the horizon in this view), and Mt. Greylock (3,491 ft.)
