= Mount Ward (Massachusetts) =

Summit in Marlboro, Massachusetts, U.S.

Coordinates: 42.3558°N 71.4972°W

Mount Ward is a small summit in Marlborough, Massachusetts. The summit rises to an elevation of 126 meters or 413 feet. The hill is located east of the city. The summit is located within a dedicated conservation area, Marlborough's Mount Ward Conservation Land. The summit can be reached via a dedicated trail, where a large maple tree graces the summit. The tree is estimated to be over 100 years old.
