= Pine Cobble Mountain =

Mountain in Massachusetts, United States

Coordinates: 42°43′15″N 73°09′58″W

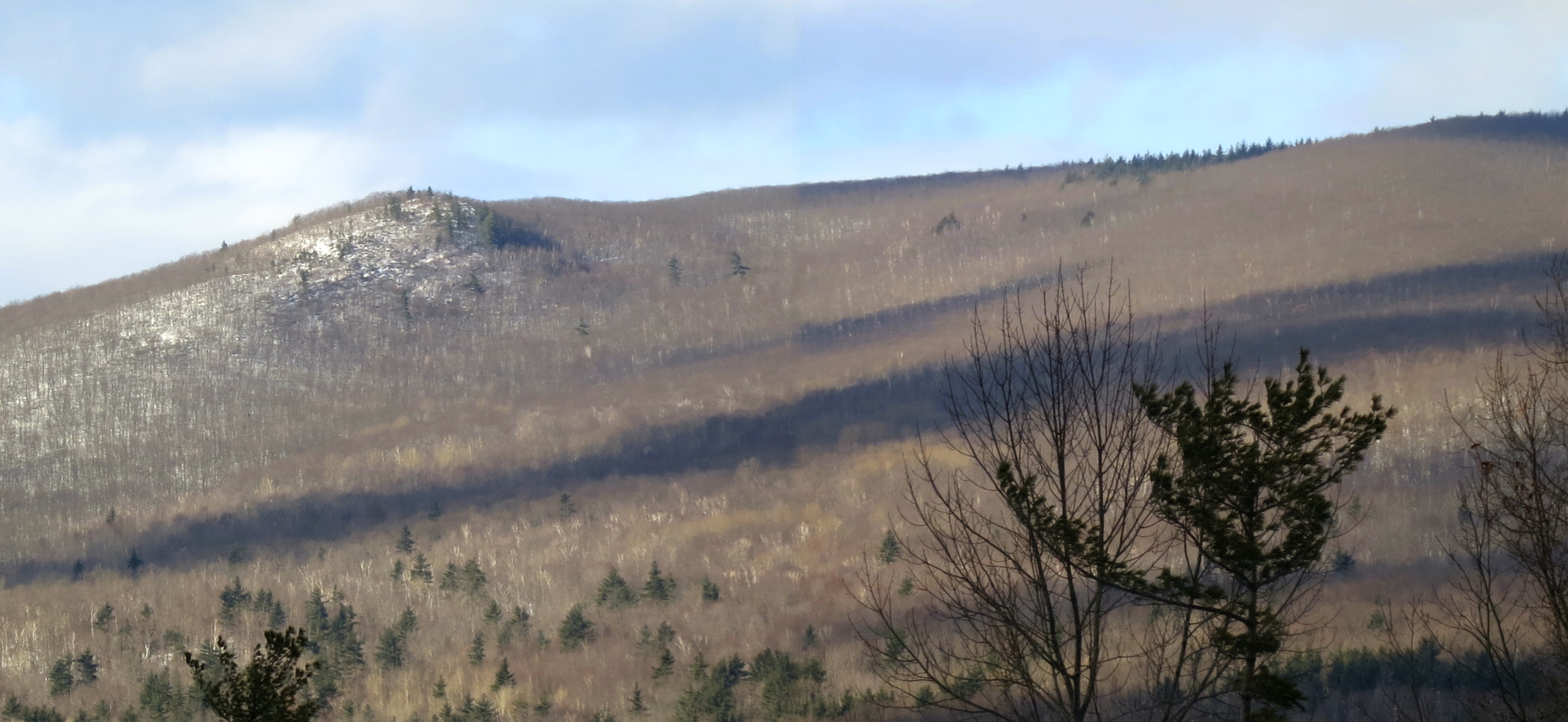
Pine Cobble is the outcropping on the left in this photo of East Mountain, whose summit resides within Clarksburg State Forest.

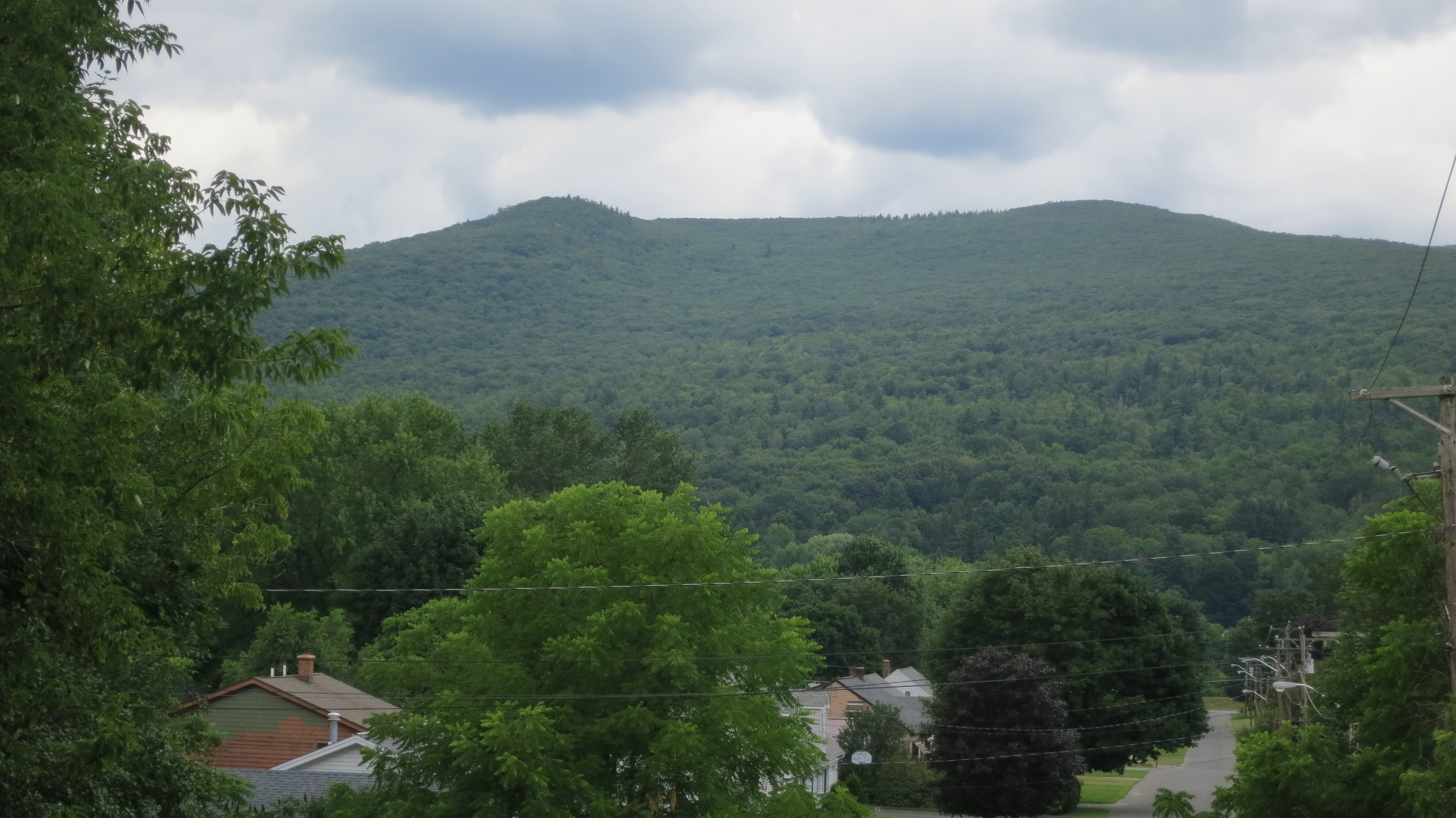
East Mountain in the background (right) rises above the Pine Cobble outcropping (left) in this photo taken from the valley.

Pine Cobble Mountain, located in Williamstown, Massachusetts, is a sub-summit of East Mountain in the Clarksburg State Forest. This outcropping is best known as a popular hiking destination, where an outlook encompasses panoramic views of Williamstown, the Mount Greylock Range, and North Adams.

The USGS benchmark at the summit is 577 meters or 1,894 feet above sea level.

The 1.6-mile hiking trail to the Pine Cobble summit is located on land owned by the Massachusetts Department of Conservation and Recreation, Williams College and Williamstown Rural Lands Foundation, Inc. The latter organization, in conjunction with the Williams College Outing Club, maintains this trail.

== Recreation ==
The Pine Cobble Trail is also an approach to the Appalachian Trail, which is intercepted 0.5 miles beyond the Pine Cobble outcropping. It also serves as an access to Vermont's Long Trail, which begins at the Massachusetts/Vermont border where these two converged trails enter the Green Mountain National Forest.
