= South Taconic Trail =

Hiking trail in the United States

Coordinates: 42°02′39″N 73°29′33″W

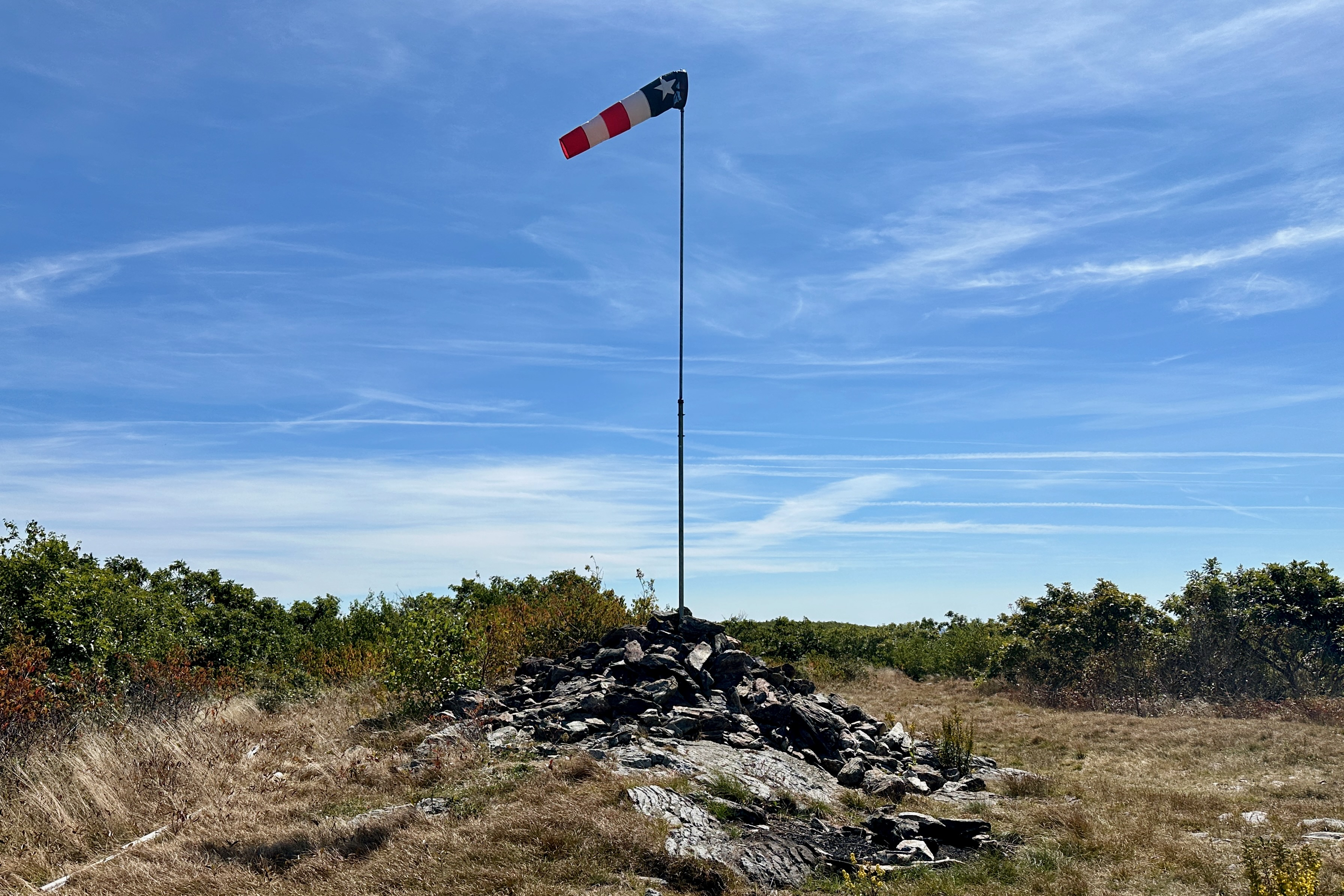
- Summit of Brace Mountain, highest point on the trail
- Length: 21.3 mi (34.3 km)
- Location: Dutchess County / Columbia County, New York; Berkshire County, Massachusetts
- Use: hiking, backpacking, snowshoeing
- Highest point: Brace Mountain, 2,311 ft (704 m)
- Lowest point: Bash Bish Brook, 732 ft (223 m)
- Difficulty: Moderately difficult
- Season: easiest mid-May through early October
- Hazards: deer ticks, poison ivy, weather

The South Taconic Trail is a 21.3 mi (34.3 km) hiking trail in the Taconic Mountains of southwest Massachusetts and adjacent New York. The trail extends from Shagroy Road in Millerton, New York, north along the ridgecrest of the southern Taconic Range and the border of New York and Massachusetts, and ends north of the Catamount Ski Area on Massachusetts Route 23 700 feet (210 m) east of the New York border in Egremont, Massachusetts. The Appalachian Trail, which traverses an adjacent ridgeline in the same mountain range, parallels the South Taconic Trail 3 mi (4.8 km) to the east. The trails are connected to one another via shorter trails.

== Description ==
The South Taconic Trail passes through the New York towns of Millerton and Copake and the Massachusetts towns of Mount Washington and Egremont. it passes through Taconic State Park, Mount Washington State Forest, and Bash Bish Falls State Park. The trail, marked with white blazes, follows a series of high, open summits and ridgeline overlooking the Hudson River Valley to the west. Overnight camping is allowed on the trail at designated locations on Alander Mountain and at the Copake Falls Campground in Taconic State Park. The trail is maintained by the Berkshire Chapter of the Appalachian Mountain Club, the mid-Hudson chapter of the Adirondack Mountain Club, the New York - New Jersey Trail Conference, and the Sierra Club.

Forest types of the South Taconic Trail are mixed oak-hickory forest and northern hardwood forest with microclimate summit balds and alkaline-loving plant communities. The geology is thrust faulted metamorphic rock over younger sedimentary rock.

Features along the route include the summits of Brace Mountain, Alander Mountain, Sunset Rocks, Mount Fray, and perhaps Massachusetts' most famous waterfall, Bash Bish Falls.

In 2015, the South Taconic Trail Extension was completed, a six-mile section of trail that connects Brace Mountain to Rudd Pond State Park to the South.

== See also ==
- The Appalachian Trail
- Taconic Trails
