= Brace Mountain =

Mountain in New York, United States

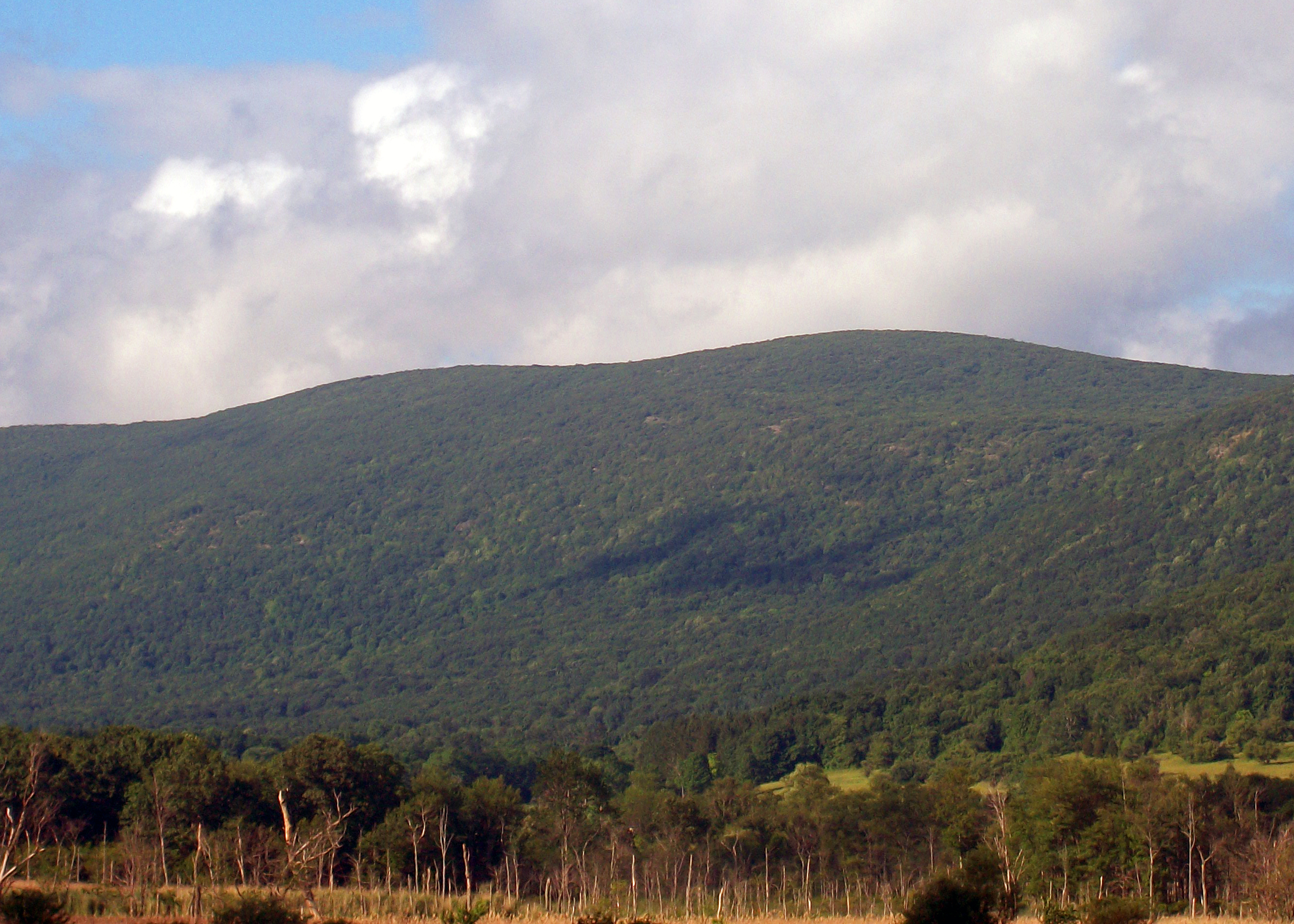
- Mountain from southwest

Highest point
- Elevation: 2,311 ft (704 m)
- Prominence: 100 ft (30 m)
- Parent peak: Mount Frissell
- Listing: New York County High Points 21st
- Coordinates: 42°02′39″N 73°29′33″W

Geography
- Location within New York
- Location: North East, New York and Salisbury, Connecticut
- Parent range: Taconic Mountains
- Topo map(s): USGS Ashley Falls, Copake

Geology
- Rock age: Ordovician
- Mountain type(s): Thrust fault; metamorphic rock

Climbing
- Easiest route: South Taconic Trail

Brace Mountain is the peak of a ridge in the southern Taconic Mountains, near the tripoint of the U.S. states of New York, Connecticut and Massachusetts. Its 2,311-foot (704 m) main summit is located in New York; it is the highest point in that state's Dutchess County.

The New York and Massachusetts portions of the mountain are within protected areas; Taconic State Park and Mount Washington State Forest respectively. The Connecticut portions are privately owned and conserved.

It is a challenging yet popular hike since its summit, along with 2,304-foot (702 m) subpeak South Brace Mountain, are along the 15.7 mi (25.3 km) South Taconic Trail. Hikers approach the mountain either from the New York side on the west via the South Taconic or from another trail following the Connecticut-Massachusetts state line on the east, a route that allows them to visit both the tristate marker and the highest point in Connecticut, near the summit of Mount Frissell, along the way. Brace's bald summit, marked by a large cairn, offers views in all directions, particularly to the Hudson Valley and Catskills to the west. It has become a popular site for launching hang gliders and paragliders.

== Geography ==
Brace is near the south end of an escarpment roughly paralleling the Connecticut and Massachusetts state lines, which runs north–south east of the summit, in North East, New York, at the northeast corner of a narrow northward extension of Dutchess County. To its east is the largely undeveloped, privately owned Riga Plateau, with Riga Lake, Connecticut's highest at 1,749 ft (533 m), to the south in the town of Salisbury, Connecticut. Due east, on the other escarpment, is 2,316-foot (706 m) Bear Mountain, Connecticut's highest summit. There is a 100-foot (30 m) drop into the col between Brace and South Brace, a quarter-mile (250 m) to the south. The ridge continues to the south for several miles past the lower Mount Riga and Thorpe Mountain before ending where U.S. Route 44 crosses the state line.

One mile (1.6 km) to the northeast is the nearest other summit, 2,453-foot (748 m) Mount Frissell, located just over Connecticut's northern border in Mount Washington, Massachusetts. A short distance from the summit, the state line reaches 2,370 feet (720 m), the highest elevation in Connecticut. To its east is 2,296-foot (700 m) Round Mountain, in Connecticut.

Approximately 0.3 miles (0.48 km) north-northeast of Brace's summit is the tripoint where New York, Connecticut and Massachusetts meet. The ridge continues north-northwest to 2,250-foot (690 m) Alander Mountain, in the western corner of Massachusetts, where the highest point in New York's Columbia County is located at the state line below the summit. Beyond that it continues to Catamount Ski Area, straddling the state line.

The west slope of the ridge drops steeply 1,300 feet (400 m) to the narrow floor of the north end of the Harlem Valley, the northern terminus of the Oblong, a narrow strip of land along easternmost today's Westchester, Putnam, and Dutchess Counties claimed by both New York and Connecticut during the Colonial era. Here there are some farms and houses, with New York State Route 22 and the Harlem Valley Rail Trail running through. Across the valley, in the town of Ancram, rises 1,346-foot (410 m) Fox Hill.

Four miles (6.4 km) to the south is the village of Millerton, New York, the nearest large settlement. The small hamlet of Copake, New York, is three miles (4.8 km) to the north-northwest. In Connecticut, Lakeville is to the southwest of the Riga Plateau area.

The west side of Brace Mountain drains into the Noster Kill, then into Bash Bish Brook, the Roeliff Jansen Kill, thence the Hudson River and the Atlantic Ocean. The southwest side drains into Webatuck Creek, Ten Mile River, thence the Housatonic River and Long Island Sound. The southeast side drains into Riga Lake and South Pond, then into Wachocostinook Brook, Salmon Creek, and the Housatonic River. The north side drains into Ashley Hill Brook, thence Bash Bish Brook, and the Roeliff Jansen Kill.

== Access ==
The white-blazed South Taconic Trail traverses the summit. It provides for both access from the west, via its southern terminus, and the east via the connecting Mt. Frissell trail along the Connecticut-Massachusetts state line. An old, unmarked dirt road also connects to the South Taconic north of the summit from more directly east of the mountain. Other access routes that once approached from the Riga Lake area at the southeast have been closed in Connecticut by the landowner, their blazes removed in New York.

Approaching via the South Taconic from the west, entirely within New York, is a common route to the summit but also entails the greatest vertical ascent. The trailhead for the South Taconic is located on Quarry Hill Road, a long dead-end street in the northern section of North East, at an elevation just under 1,000 feet (300 m). After passing along the edge of an old meadow, it enters the woods, crosses into Taconic State Park and then climbs steeply past a series of cascades on the south side, at some points requiring that hikers scramble. It levels off at 1,700 feet (520 m), where the first of many views over Dutchess and Columbia counties to the Catskill Escarpment on the other side of the Hudson River open up. At that point it turns north and goes through some private lands over South Brace to Brace. The total distance from the trailhead is 1.9 miles (3.1 km) with a 1,300-foot (400 m) vertical gain.

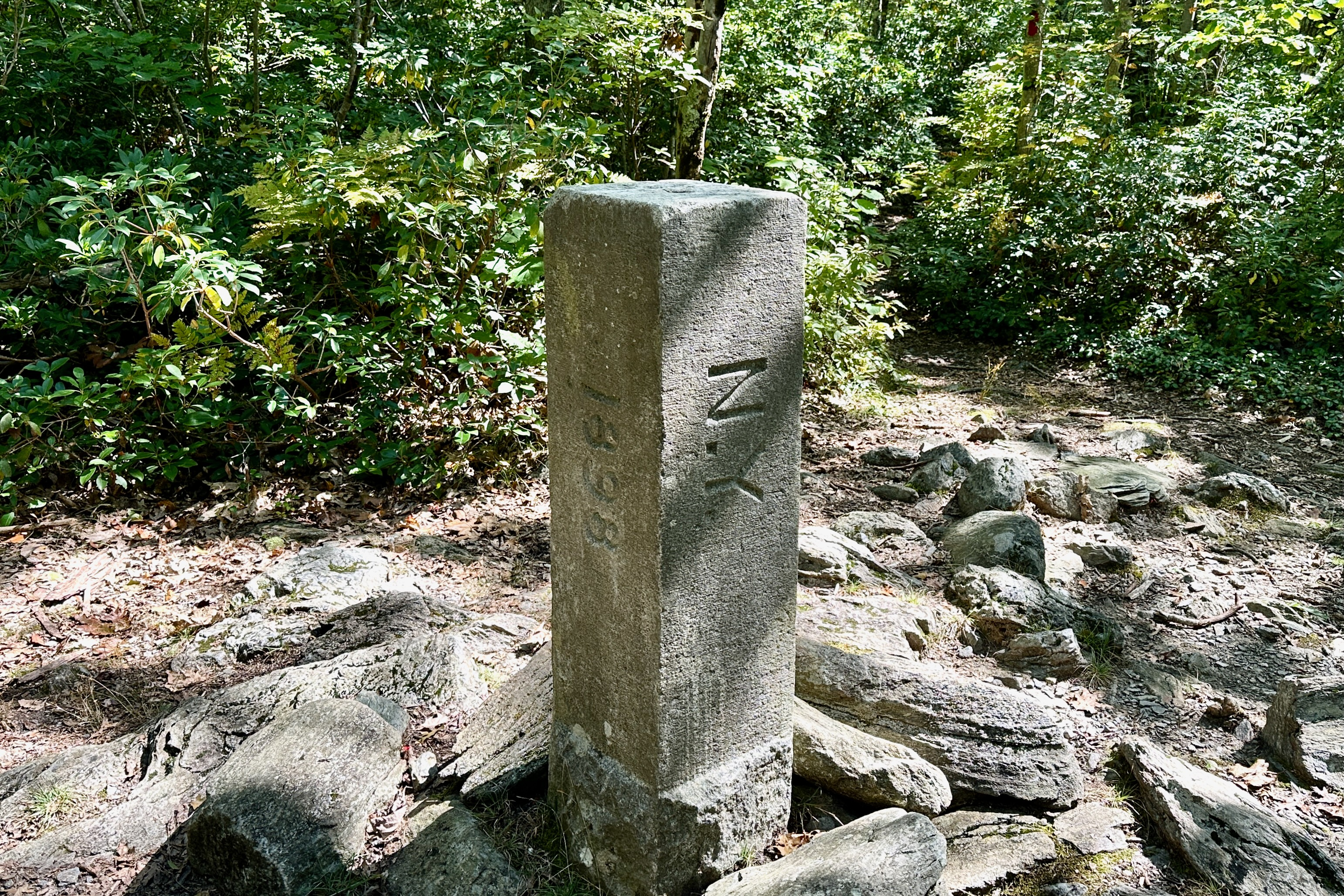
Mount Frissell Trail passing the Connecticut–Massachusetts–New York tri-state marker

On the west the Mount Frissell Trail starts following red blazes at a trailhead on the state line, on an unpaved road known as East Street in Mount Washington and Mt. Washington Road in Salisbury. From an elevation of 1,830 feet (560 m) It first bends into Massachusetts, then returns to Connecticut where it climbs to the open summit of Round Mountain, where Frissell and Brace can be seen ahead. Descending into the woods, it re-enters Massachusetts and makes a short but steep climb to the summit of Frissell. A register for visitors to the Connecticut high point hangs from a tree; the highpoint itself is marked by a small survey stake a short distance further along the trail, after it descends slightly and follows the state line. From the highpoint it drops gently to pass the tri-state marker. Its western terminus, 2.2 miles (3.5 km) from the trailhead, is on the South Taconic approximately 0.3 miles (480 m) north of Brace's summit. It is thus 2.5 miles (4.0 km) via this approach, with a vertical gain of roughly 1,000 ft (300 m) due to the ascents of Round and Frissell required by the route.

The approach via the unofficial Brace Mountain Trail is the gentlest and shortest, but less used due to the limited parking and minimal maintenance of the trail, entirely on private land in Connecticut. The unblazed, gated road starts from a small parking area on Mount Washington Road two miles (3.2 km) north of the dam at South Pond in Lakeville, just south of where the road, the highest in Connecticut, crosses the shoulder of Gridley Mountain. From this 1,900-foot (580 m) elevation it descends slightly to cross an unnamed tributary of Monument Brook, after which an overgrown ascends gently to the state line marker, 1.3 miles (2.1 km) from the parking area. From there it is a more sustained climb 0.2 miles (320 m) to the South Taconic and an equivalent distance to the summit. The total distance for this approach is 1.7 miles (2.7 km) with a 460-foot (140 m) vertical gain from the brook crossing.

There are also two long approaches from the north. On the New York side, the red-blazed Robert Brook Trail leaves the blue-blazed Alander Brook Trail 450 feet (140 m) from that trail's head along Under Mountain Road in Ancram. From there it climbs 1,050 feet (320 m) in 1.1 miles (1.8 km) to the South Taconic Trail just west of the state line, 2.6 miles (4.2 km) north of Brace's summit. In Massachusetts, the blue-blazed Ashley Hill Trail leaves the Alander Mountain Trail west of the Mount Washington State Forest headquarters at the junction of East and West streets. Two possible forks allow for a 4-mile (6.4 km) route to Brace via the Mount Frissell Trail.

== Summit ==
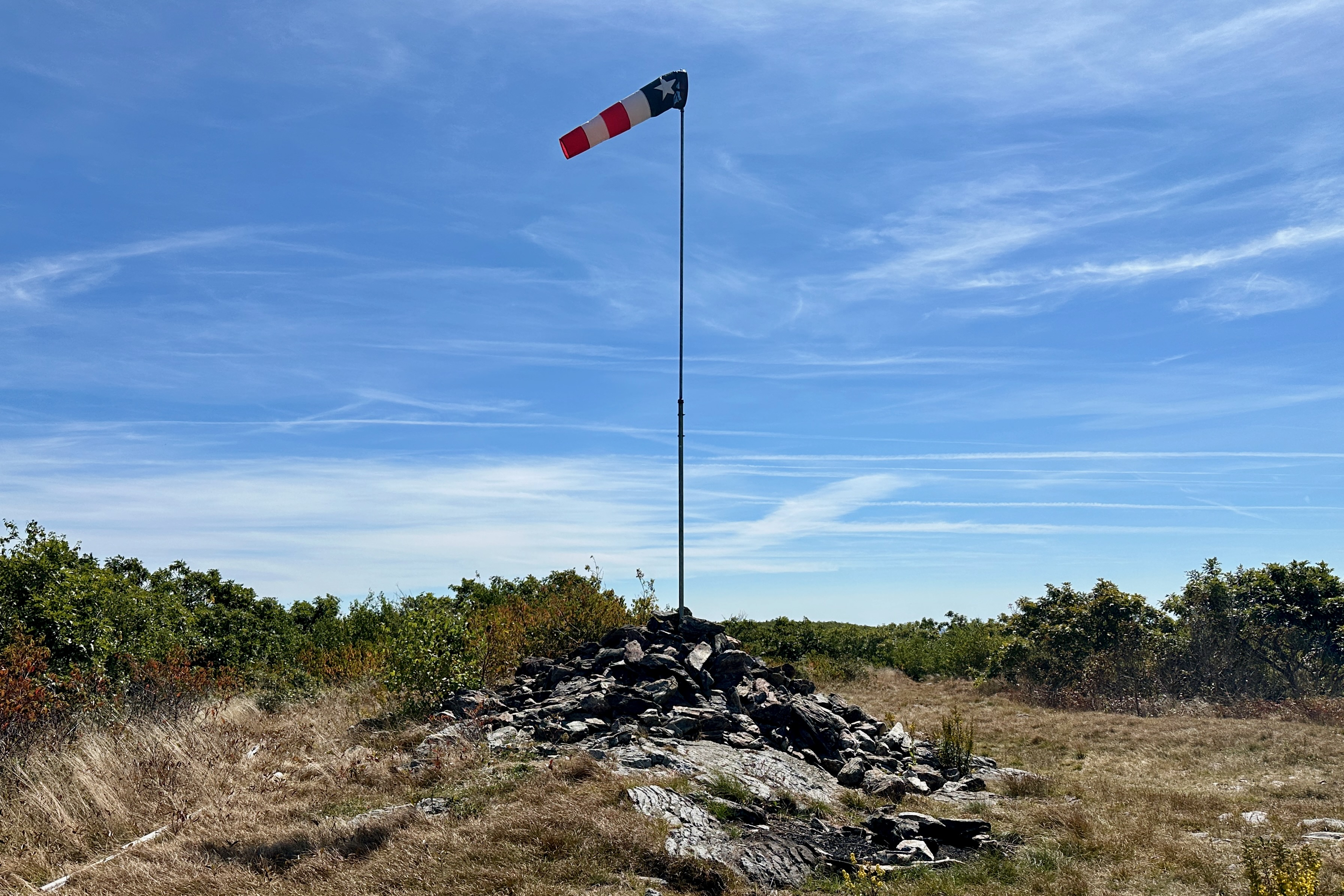
Cairn and windsock atop Brace Mountain

The summit of Brace is an open area with scrubby forest on the slopes. A cairn several feet high, with a small windsock attached, sits on the highest ground. There are views available in all directions.

To the west are the highest mountains visible from Brace, the Catskills. The dominant visible feature is the long Escarpment to the north, with 4,040-foot (1,230 m) Hunter Mountain, the highest point of Greene County, high above the peaks of the Devil's Path beyond it. Further south are the peaks of Ulster County, including Slide, the highest in that county and the Catskills at 4,180 feet (1,270 m).

Northwest the Helderberg Escarpment is visible, south of Albany. Closer to the mountain, the lower hills of Columbia and Dutchess counties are below. In the latter, Stissing Mountain and its fire tower, south of Pine Plains stand out. The Hudson Highlands are in the distant southwest.

To the east the landscape falls away into the Riga Plateau, with Gridley and Bear rising across it. Riga Lake can be seen to the south of them. The higher peaks of the vicinity, Frissell and Round, are visible on the northeast, although the former blocks the view of Mount Everett, the 2,602-foot-high (793 m) peak of the south Taconics. Next to Frissell, in the distance on clear days, Mount Greylock, Massachusetts' 3,491-foot (1,064 m) highest peak, can be seen. Due north is Alander.

== Hang gliding and paragliding ==
The Mount Brace Outdoor Club, based in the valley below the mountain, operates the landing zone for hang gliding and paragliding from the summit. All such foot-launched aircraft pilots must sign in at the club, whether or not they are members. This is done under permit with the state Office of Parks, Recreation and Historic Preservation; pilots who do not check in with the club can be cited and fined.

Pilots must obey some other rules as well. They must be current United States Hang Gliding and Paragliding Association (USHPA) members with a rating of at least P3/H2 to fly without instructor supervision; P2/H2-rated pilots must have a minimum of 10 mountain flights from more than a thousand feet (300 m) above ground level, witnessed by an instructor, in their logbooks in order to fly unsupervised, since the launch area at the summit is steep and narrow. No flights are permitted on days with winds of more than 26 miles per hour (42 km/h).

The windsock on the summit cairn was placed to allow the pilots to judge conditions. They hike in either from the east via the old road or up the South Taconic from its southern trailhead. There are some other lower launch areas lower on the mountain, on private land. It is one of the more popular locations for hang gliding and paragliding in the Northeast due to the gradual geography of the area and the thermals allowing smooth flight down the 1,600 feet (490 m) to the LZ at the club facilities.

== See also ==
- List of mountains in New York
