= Bish =

Bish may refer to:

== Music ==
- Bish (album), by singer/songwriter Stephen Bishop
- Bish (group), a Japanese idol group

== People ==
- Clover Bish (born 1998), Spanish drag queen
- Diane Bish (born 1941) American organist and composer
- Matt Bish (born 1975), Ugandan filmmaker
- Milan D. Bish (1929–2001), American diplomat
- Molly Bish (1983–2000), American murder victim
- Randy Bish, American editorial cartoonist working for the Pittsburgh Tribune-Review
- Stanley Bish (born 1951), Dutch former professional footballer
- Bishan Singh Bedi (1946–2023), Indian cricketer, nicknamed Bish

== Other uses ==
- St. Joseph's Patrician College (slang "The Bish"), a secondary school in Ireland
- Bishōnen or "Bish", a Japanese term literally meaning "beautiful youth (boy)"
- Bishōjo or "Bish", a Japanese term used to refer to young and pretty girls

== See also ==
- Bash Bish Falls, a waterfall
- Bash Bish Falls State Park
- Bishop (disambiguation)
- Bisht (surname)
