= Mount Everett State Reservation =

State reservation in Mount Washington and Sheffield, Massachusetts, U.S.

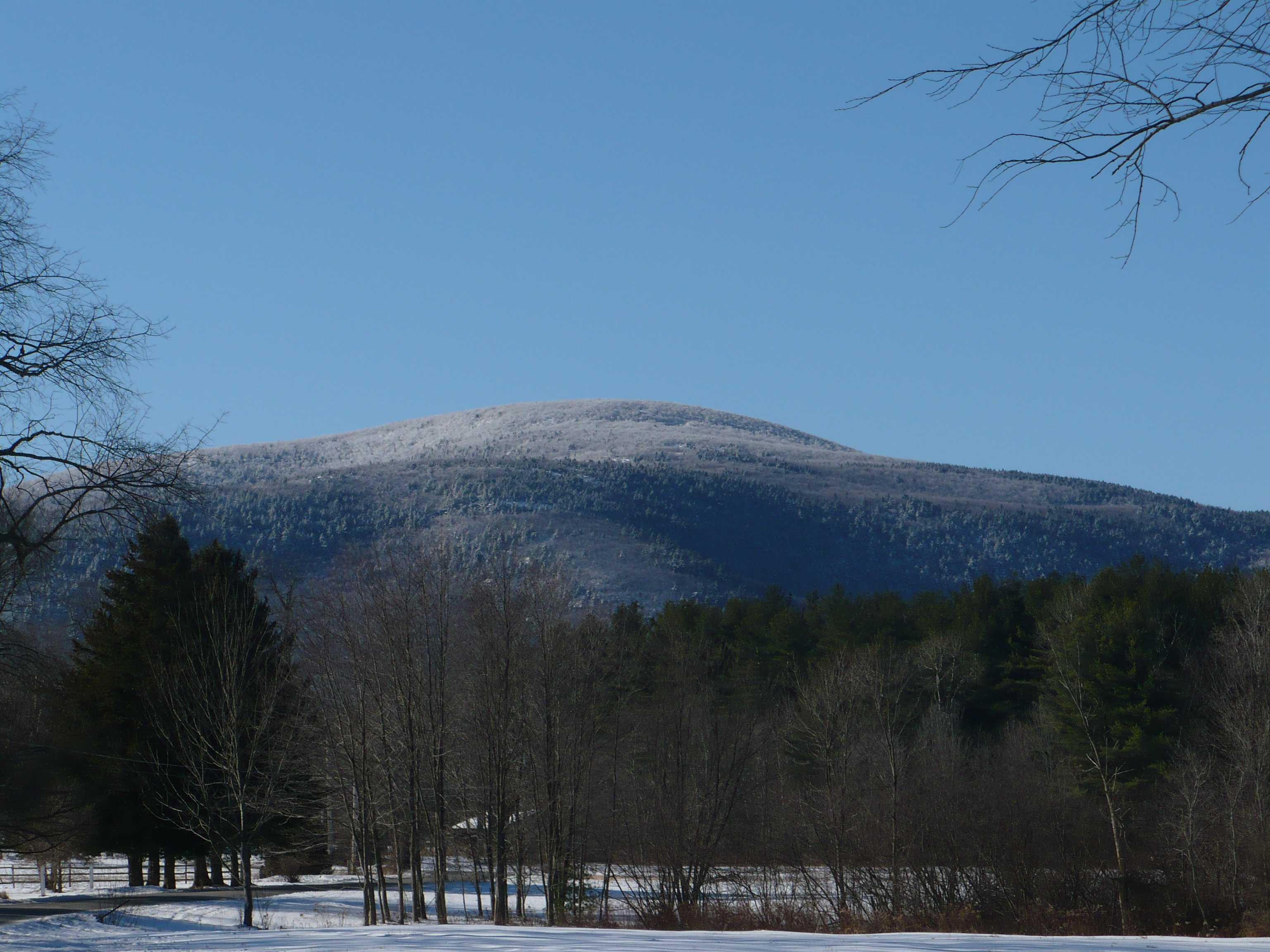
- Mount Everett

- Location within Massachusetts Location within the United States
- Location: Mount Washington and Sheffield, Massachusetts, United States
- Coordinates: 42°06′07″N 73°25′57″W
- Area: 2,492 acres (10.08 km^{2})
- Elevation: 2,602 ft (793 m)
- Established: 1908
- Administrator: Massachusetts Department of Conservation and Recreation
- Website: Official website

Mount Everett State Reservation is a public recreation area in the towns of Mount Washington and Sheffield, Massachusetts, that offers panoramic views of Massachusetts, Connecticut, and New York from the summit of 2,624-foot (800 m) Mount Everett. The reservation abuts Jug End State Reservation and Wildlife Management Area; Bash Bish Falls State Park and Mount Washington State Forest lie to the west. All are managed by the Massachusetts Department of Conservation and Recreation.

== History ==
The state legislature established the Mount Everett Reservation Commission in 1908. The commission was provided a fund of $5000 to purchase land in the towns of Mount Washington and Sheffield that would become the Mount Everett State Reservation. By 1912, a little over half of the appropriation had been used to purchase 815 acres. The commission was abolished in 1975 when management of the reservation was transferred to the Department of Natural Resources.

== Old growth forest ==
The reservation has about 530 acres (210 ha) of old-growth forest, most of which is found on the east side of Mount Everett. The forest contains eastern hemlock, eastern white pine, and hardwoods such as sugar and red maple, white and northern red oak, American beech, and sweet and yellow birch. Old-growth forest with a similar composition occurs around Guilder Pond. Mount Everett's summit supports a dwarf forest of pitch pine and bear oak that, aside from clearing for a fire tower and trails, has not been disturbed for centuries.

== Activities and amenities ==
The Appalachian Trail traverses the entire length of the reservation from south to north, crossing the summit of Mount Everett as it does. Additional trails are available for hiking and cross-country skiing. Picnicking and canoeing are found at Guilder Pond.
