= Mount Fray =

Mountain in New York, United States

- Location within Massachusetts

Highest point
- Elevation: 1,893 ft (577 m)
- Coordinates: 42°09′25″N 73°28′53″W

Geography
- Location: Copake, New York and southwest Berkshire County, Massachusetts
- Parent range: Taconic Mountains

Geology
- Rock age: Ordovician
- Mountain type(s): Thrust fault; metamorphic rock

Climbing
- Easiest route: South Taconic Trail

Mount Fray, 1,893 feet (577 m), also known as Catamount because of the Catamount Ski Area located on its north slope, is a prominent peak of the south Taconic Mountains, located in southwest Massachusetts and adjacent New York. The summit is open and covered in scrub oak; it offers views west over the Hudson River Valley. The sides of the mountain are wooded with northern hardwood tree species. The 15.7 mi (25.3 km) South Taconic Trail passes over the summit of Mount Fray.

== Details ==
The south and west sides of the mountain are within Taconic State Park, while the north side is part of the Catamount Ski area. Other parcels are privately owned or are in conservation easement. The summit and northeast side of the mountain are within Egremont, Massachusetts; the southeast side is part of the town of Mount Washington, Massachusetts. The west side falls within Copake, New York.

The east side of Mount Fray drains into Kenner Brook, Hubbard Brook, thence the Housatonic River and Long Island Sound. The west side drains into the Roeliff Jansen Kill, thence the Hudson River and Long Island Sound.
