= Benjamin Osborn House =

Historic house in Massachusetts, United States

- U.S. National Register of Historic Places
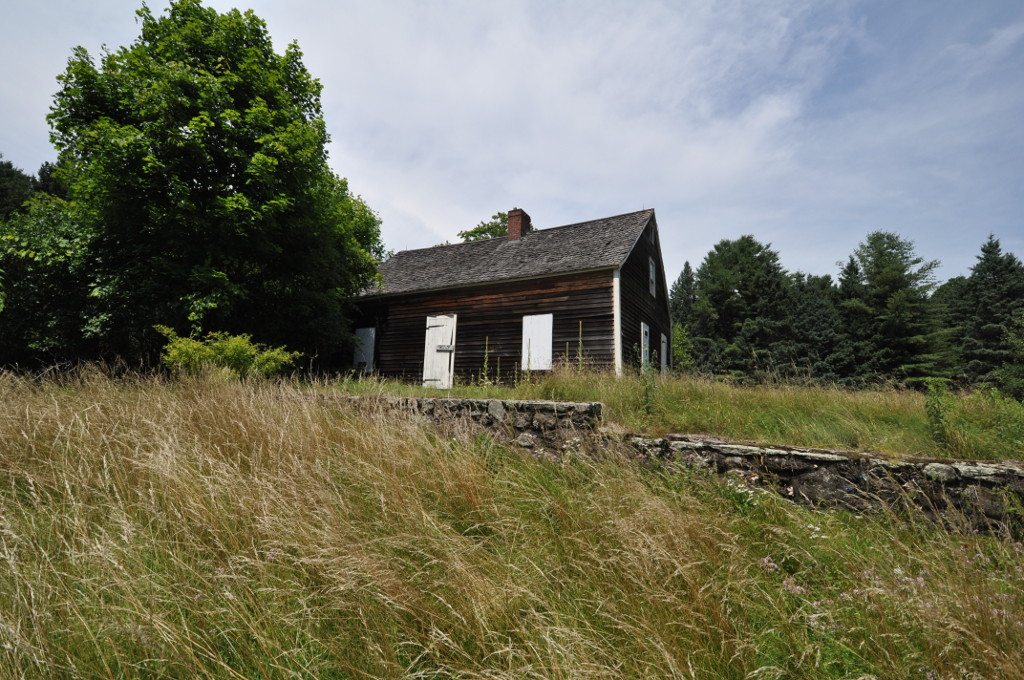
- 2016 photo

- Location within Massachusetts Location within the United States
- Location: Mount Washington, Massachusetts
- Coordinates: 42°7′2″N 73°28′12″W
- Built: 1759
- Architectural style: Colonial
- NRHP reference No.: 87001758
- Added to NRHP: October 1, 1987

The Benjamin Osborn House was a historic house off West Street in Mount Washington, Massachusetts. Built about 1759, it was a modest vernacular Georgian Cape style house. It was notable as a site where Shaker founder Mother Ann Lee stayed in 1781. The house was listed on the National Register of Historic Places in 1987. It was owned by the state, and located in Mount Washington State Forest.

== Description and history ==
The Osborn House was located down a long, wooded (and now abandoned) drive on the east side of West Road in Mount Washington, just to the east of a more modern, abandoned house. It was a 1 1/2-story wood-frame structure, three bays wide, with a side-gable roof, clapboard siding, and a central chimney. Its exterior was devoid of significant stylistic elements. The interior had mainly 20th-century finishes, although the building's post and beam structure was visible. Its original two fireplaces had been replaced by a single one. The property includes an unmaintained orchard with trees estimated to be over 150 years old, and the Osborn family cemetery, located near West Street.

The house was probably built not long after Benjamin Osborn bought a large tract of land here in 1759. Shaker founder Mother Ann Lee stayed at the farmhouse during her May 1781 missionary journey to Tucconack Mountain (renamed Mount Washington, following the American victory in the American Revolutionary War). She is reported to have stayed in the area for about ten days, attracting large numbers of both sympathizers and detractors.

The house was acquired by the state in 1958, and was part of Mount Washington State Forest.

The Osborn House, and the other nearby building, were struck by fire on December 15, 2019, as was a private residence in the vicinity. The historic Osborn House was totally destroyed, and the fires are regarded by the state Fire Marshal's office as suspect.

== See also ==
- National Register of Historic Places listings in Berkshire County, Massachusetts
