= Alander Mountain =

Mountain in the United States

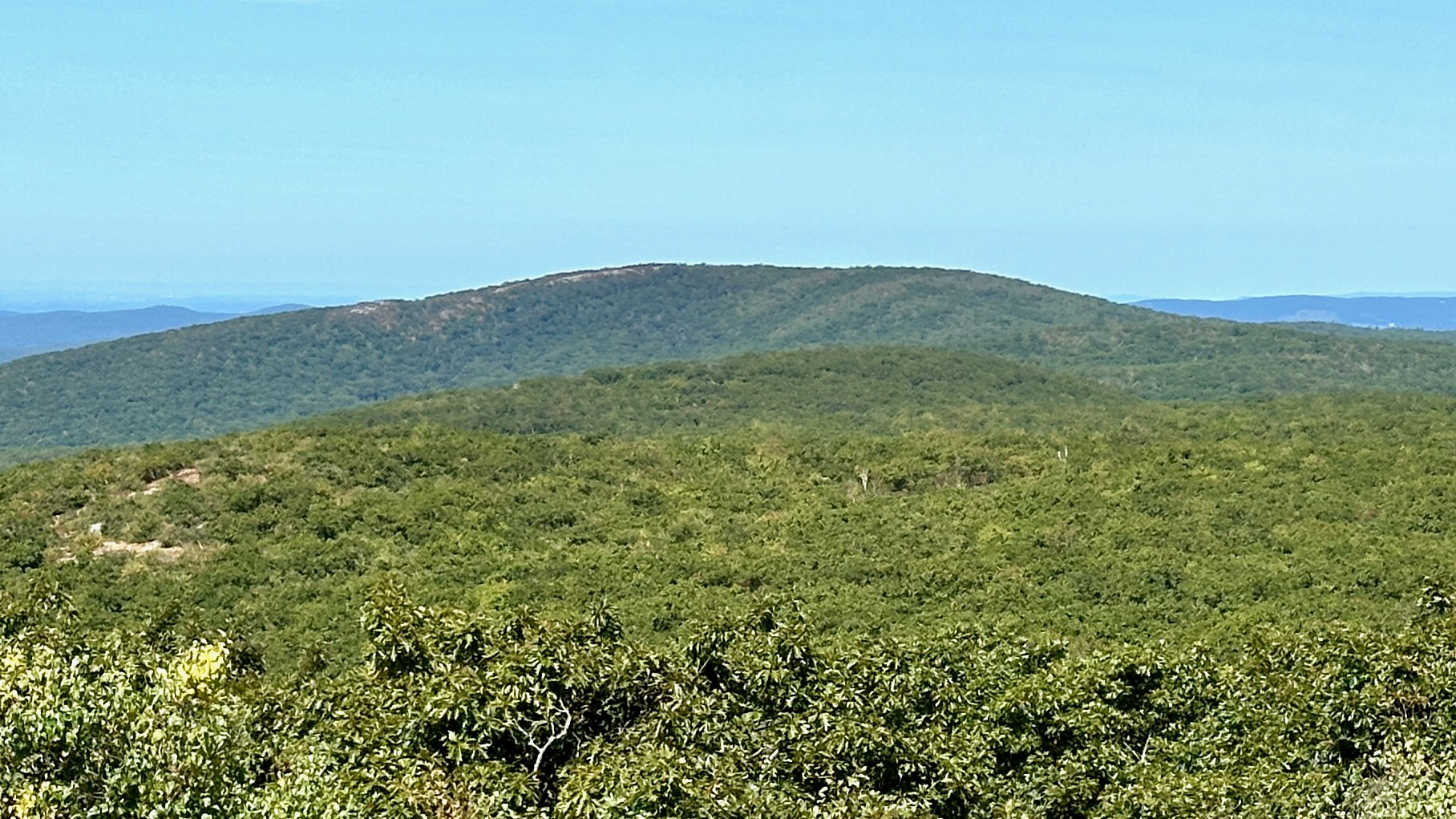
- Alander Mountain, viewed from Brace Mountain

Highest point
- Elevation: 2,241 ft (683 m)
- Prominence: 272 ft (83 m)
- Listing: New York County High Points 30th
- Coordinates: 42°05′16″N 73°30′16″W, 42°05′15″N 73°29′57″W

Geography
- Location within Massachusetts
- Location: Copake, New York and Mount Washington, Massachusetts
- Parent range: Taconic Mountains
- Topo map(s): USGS Copake, Bash Bish Falls

Geology
- Rock age: Ordovician
- Mountain type(s): Thrust fault; metamorphic rock

Climbing
- Easiest route: Alander Mountain Trail and Alander Loop Trail

Alander Mountain is a 2,241-foot-tall (683 m) part of the south Taconic Mountains in southwest Massachusetts and adjacent to New York. The summit is grassy and covered with scrub oak and shrubs; the sides of the mountain are heavily forested. Several trails traverse Alander Mountain, most notably is the 15.7 mi (25.3 km) South Taconic Trail, which passes just beneath the summit.

Much of the mountain is located within Taconic State Park and Mount Washington State Forest; other parcels are privately held.

The west slope of Alander is within Copake, New York. The point where the state line crosses the ridge next to the South Taconic Trail is, at 2,115 feet (645 m), the highest elevation in Columbia County. The summit and east side are within the town of Mount Washington, Massachusetts. The west side of Alander Mountain drains into the Preachy Hill Brook, then into the Noster Kill, Bash Bish Brook, the Roeliff Jansen Kill, thence the Hudson River and Long Island Sound. The east side drains into Ashley Hill Brook, then Bash Bish Brook and the Roeliff Jansen Kill.

== History ==
In 1926, the Taconic State Park Commission determined that a station on Alander Mountain would be useful, not just within the park, but also for large adjacent areas. In early 1927 state forest rangers supervised the erection a 60-foot-tall (18 m) Aermotor LS40 steel fire lookout tower on the mountain. Approximately three miles (4.8 km) of telephone line was constructed to connect the tower with the New York telephone system. Initially, the tower was intended for spotting fires in the park, but later on, arrangements were made with the TSPC so that fires on State land or private land outside the park would be reported as well. In August 1930, the Conservation Commission received a notice from Mr. William A. Miles of Salisbury, Connecticut that he was terminating the lease to the part of his property being used as the site for the tower. In response, the park had the tower dismantled by the end of the year.

The parts were placed in storage at High Valley Farm, the home of then-Commissioner Francis R. Masters until it was decided where the tower would be rebuilt. In 1932, the Conservation Department agreed to accept a transfer of the tower from the TSPC. In late 1932, the tower was rebuilt on private lands on Washburn Mountain and became operational in 1933. The tower remained on Washburn Mountain until 1964 when it was moved to Beebe Hill, where it still remains today.

== See also ==
- List of mountains in Massachusetts
- List of old growth forests in Massachusetts
