= Bash Bish Falls =

Waterfall in southwestern Massachusetts

Coordinates: 42°6′47″N 73°29′43″W

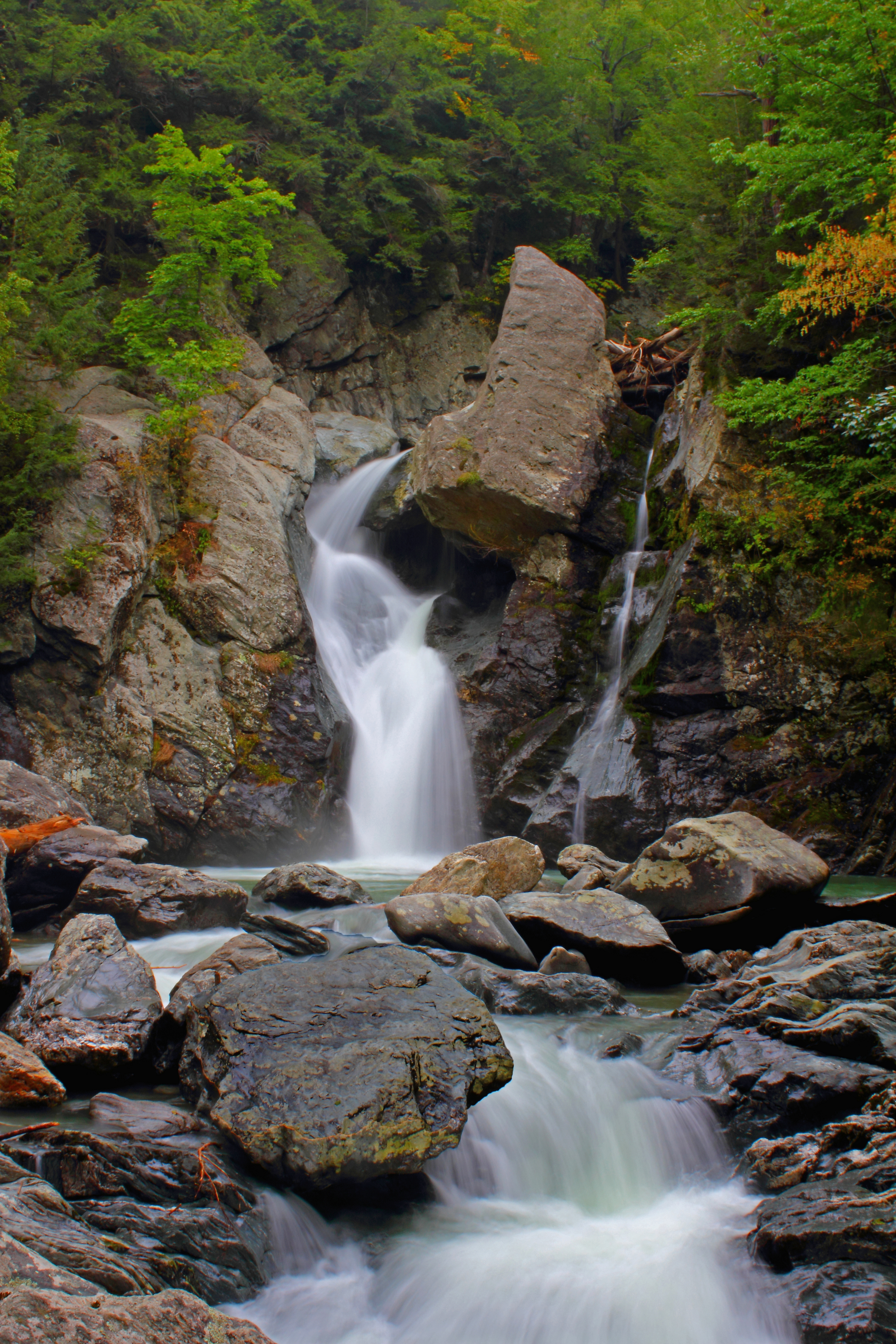
- Location: Mount Washington, Massachusetts, US
- Type: Cascade
Total height:	60 feet (18 m)		

Bash Bish Falls, a waterfall in Bash Bish Falls State Park in the Taconic Mountains of southwestern Massachusetts (Berkshire County), is the highest waterfall in the state. The falls are made up of a series of cascades, nearly 200 feet (61 m) in total. The final cascade is split into twin falls by a jutting rock, dropping in a 59-foot (18 m) "V" over boulders to a serene pool below.

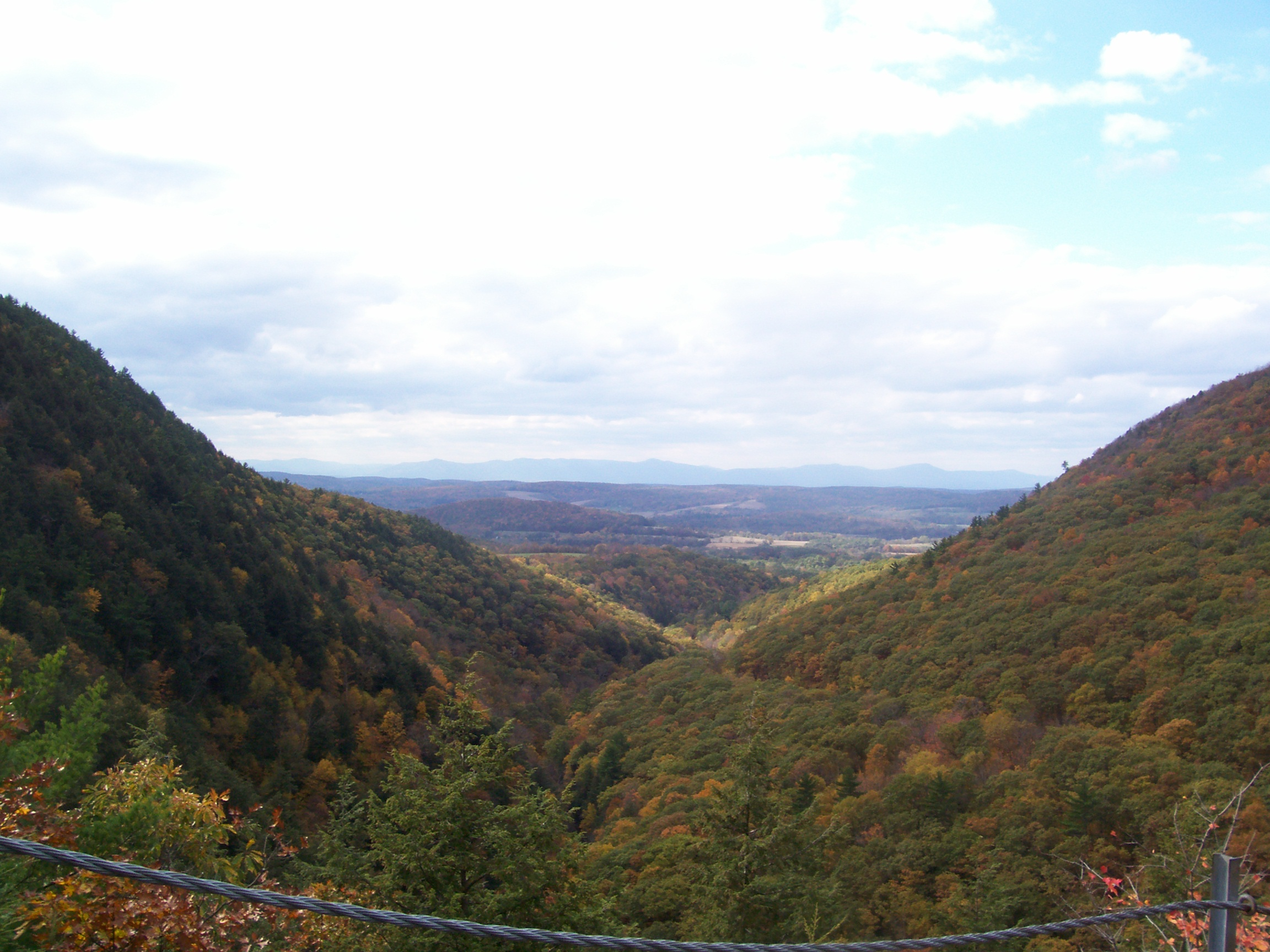
View from the summit atop Bash Bish Falls

The waters of Bash Bish Falls begin at a spring in Mount Washington and after the falls, Bash Bish Brook has cut a 1,000-foot deep valley on its way westward to adjacent New York State. The brook cuts between Bash Bish Mountain (elevation 1890) and Cedar Mountain (elevation 1883) creating a dramatic gorge that frames the falls.

Bash Bish Falls State Park is located next to both Massachusetts' 4,000-acre (16 km^{2}) Mount Washington State Forest and New York's 5,000-acre (20 km^{2}) Taconic State Park.

== Access ==
Although Bash Bish Falls are located in Mt. Washington, MA, they are more easily accessed from Copake Falls, NY. From Highway 344 in Copake Falls, Falls Road veers off, leading to the park's two parking areas. These are the two main access points for viewing Bash Bish Falls. From the lower parking area (the New York side of the state border), there is a .75 mile gentle uphill trail to the falls. From the upper parking area (on the Massachusetts side), the trail is shorter, but goes more steeply down to the falls. Additionally, from the Massachusetts parking lot, a short trail leads up to a viewpoint from which one can see all the way across the Hudson Valley to the Catskill Mountains.

== Tourism and recreation ==
Bash Bish Falls has been a popular destination for visitors to the region since the 1800s, when a Swiss-style chalet was perched atop the falls. Famed visitors include writers Herman Melville, Henry Longfellow, and Henry David Thoreau, Hudson River School artist John Frederick Kensett, and baseball legend, Babe Ruth.

In 2020, fueled by social media photographs and the COVID-19 pandemic (which increased use of outdoor spaces, especially those close to metropolitan areas), visitation to the falls increased exponentially, with published reports and photographs of crowds numbering an estimated 1000 to 1500 people at a time.

As a result both the Massachusetts and New York conservation park officers increased patrolling, closed or limited use of the parking area to the falls, and even closed the park for a time.

Recently the Massachusetts Department of Conservation and Recreation installed railings to prevent falls, More than 25 deaths have occurred at the Falls in the past century. Some were due to drowning, but most were due to rock climbing, rock jumping, and falls. This is a very dangerous area as rocks are slick, the gorge is deep, and pools are shallow. Swimming is not allowed. AOL Travel named Bash Bish Falls as one of the most dangerous tourist destinations in Massachusetts.

In addition to the falls themselves, other recreation attractions in the immediate area include Taconic State Park (camping, cabin rentals, fishing, swimming, hiking, cross country skiing, and hunting), a network of hiking trails including the South Taconic Trail (day hiking and overnight hiking), and the Hudson Valley Rail Trail (walking, bicycling).

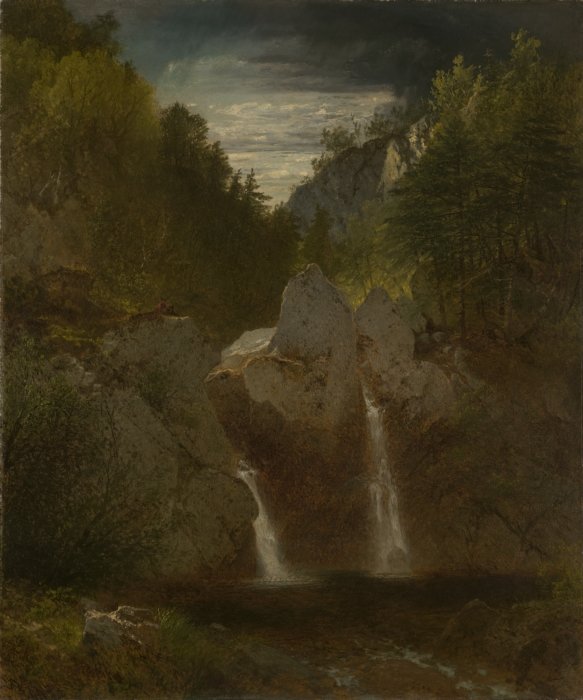
Rocky Pool Bash-Bish Falls by John Frederick Kensett, 1865

== See also ==
- List of Massachusetts State Parks
- List of old growth forests in Massachusetts
- List of waterfalls
