= Washburn Mountain =

Mountain in New York, United States

- Location within New York Location within the United States

Highest point
- Elevation: 1,496 feet (456 m)
- Coordinates: 42°06′04″N 73°31′03″W

Geography
- Location: SSE of Copake Falls, Columbia County, New York, U.S.
- Topo map: USGS Copake

Washburn Mountain is a 1,496-foot-tall (456 m) mountain in New York. It is located south-southeast Copake Falls in Columbia County. From 1932 to 1964, the mountain was the location of a 60-foot-tall (18 m) steel fire lookout tower now located on Beebe Hill. Alander Mountain is located southeast of Washburn Mountain.

== History ==
In August 1930, the Conservation Commission received a notice from Mr. William A. Miles of Salisbury, Connecticut that he was terminating the lease to the part of his property being used as the site for the tower on nearby Alander Mountain. In response the park had the tower dismantled by the end of the year. The parts were placed in storage at High Valley Farm, the home of then Commissioner Francis R. Masters, until it was decided where the tower would be rebuilt. In late 1932, the tower was rebuilt on private lands on Washburn Mountain and became operational in 1933. The tower remained on Washburn Mountain until 1964, when it was moved to Beebe Hill, where it remains today.
