= Catamount Mountain Resort =

Ski resort in New England

Catamount Ski Area
- Winter Aerial View

- Location within New York Location within the United States
- Location: Egremont, Massachusetts / Hillsdale, New York, USA
- Nearest city: Great Barrington, Massachusetts (7.5 Miles), Albany, New York (51 Miles), New York, New York (129 Miles), Boston, Massachusetts (145 Miles)
- Coordinates: 42.171457°N 73.477764°W
- Status: Operating
- Vertical: 1,000 ft (300 m)
- Top elevation: 2,000 ft (610 m)
- Skiable area: 119 acres (0.48 km^{2})
- Trails: 44
- Longest run: Ridge Run To Upper And Lower Promenade 2.5mil
- Lift system: 8 Lifts, 3 surface lifts, 2 Quads, and 3 Triples
- Terrain parks: 3
- Snowfall: 75"
- Website: Catamount Ski Area

Catamount Ski Area is a ski resort located on Mount Fray of the Taconic Mountains in Hillsdale, New York and South Egremont, Massachusetts. Catamount is one of three ski areas in the southern Berkshires; the others are Butternut in Great Barrington, and Otis Ridge in Otis. It is one of the few remaining family-owned ski areas in New England. In addition, Catamount is home to one of the largest youth ski race programs in the Northeast.

== History ==
Fray Mountain was discovered as a potential ski area by John (Jack) Falconer Fisher in 1937/38. After earning his pilot’s license at the age of 16, Fisher flew over mountains in the region, imagining where he might create either a golf course or a ski area. Jack was from nearby Salisbury, CT, and had helped bring Lime Rock Race Track and the Salisbury Ski Jump to fruition. He had many Scandinavian friends who were ski jumpers and skiers. After talking with his friends he decided to buy a farm (Fray), and called it Catamount. In 1937/38 Jack and his friends camped out for the summer at the base of the mountain, creating trails and deciding on a vision for what would become one of the first ski areas in the country.

Catamount opened for business in 1939, with three rope tows, run by a car engine with a bull wheel attached and a rope around it, pulling skiers up the hill.

Many skiers came up from New York City on the train that then ran to Hillsdale, New York. When the skiers arrived, trucks with hay bales in them for seating met the arriving skiers and delivered them to Catamount.

In 1953 Jack married Florence (Flukie) Kendall from New York City and they had two children, Katherine and Barrie. In 1958 Florence started the ski shop.

The lodge was decorated with two large fireplaces, a gravel floor, and picnic bench tables. Additions over the next 20 years included the Ski Cat Club (modeled after "Club 10" at Sugarbush Ski Area), a racing trail with a race shed for the racers, snowmaking, four chairlifts, one T-Bar, and one J-Bar.

Brothers Bill Gilbert, Sandy Gilbert, and business partner Don Edwards purchased Catamount in 1974 and took over management, adding more trails and increasing snowmaking by 25 to 98 percent. After they retired, their sons, Tom Gilbert and Rich Edwards took over management. In 2006, the summit double chairlift was replaced with a fixed-grip quad chairlift from Belleayre Mountain Ski Center.

In May 2018 the Schaefer family of Charlemont MA, longtime owners/managers of Berkshire East Mountain Resort, purchased Catamount Ski Area. During the 2018-19 season, the main Berkshire Lodge was renovated and a new triple chair was installed on the Massachusetts side. In the summer of 2018, Catamount introduced the Zip Tour on its Catamonster, the longest zipline in America.

In the 2019-20 ski season, the new Catamount Lodge opened, with additional seating, a store, and ticketing operations. Four new trails (with snowmaking) also opened with varying difficulty.

During the 2020-21 season, the new Catamount Lodge began offering food services, with additional seating in its second floor. The old Glade double chair was removed, making way for a used triple chair in its place. Construction of this new chairlift began construction in the summer of 2021. A new trail called "Lookout" rated as a blue square/intermediate also opened.

In addition to the new Glade triple, a new quad chair called the Catamount Quad replaces the old "Catamount Double" during the 2021/2022 season. Other additions include more snowmaking, a new snow tubing park, a redesigned learning area, and more dining options.

== Ticketing and Season Passes ==
In 2018, RFID gates from Axess were installed and the Catamount Direct card was introduced. Catamount is one of the first smaller ski areas in the northeast to install this technology.

=== Catamount Season Passes ===
Type	Description
AIM High Season Pass	Unlimited access to both Catamount and Berkshire East with no blackout dates; Two days at Burke Mountain and two days at Smugglers' Notch, plus 50% off additional days at both; Unlimited mid-week skiing at Burke during March.; 25% off non-holiday lodging at Burke Mountain Hotel and 25% off non-holiday lodging at Smugglers' Notch
Midweek Season Pass	Monday through Friday - day and night - at both Catamount and Berkshire East. Not valid on Saturdays or Sundays; Two (2) Midweek days at Burke, plus 50% off additional days; Two (2) Midweek days at Smugglers' Notch, plus 50% off additional days; 25% off non-holiday lodging stays at Burke Mountain Hotel; 25% off non-holiday lodging stays at Smugglers' Notch
Night	Wednesday and Thursday nights from 3pm to 8pm and Friday and Saturday nights from 3pm until 9pm. Access to Catamount and Berkshire East.; Night skiing is typically available in late December and ends in early March.
College	Same privileges as the AIM High Season Pass, only for college students.

Catamount is also part of the Indy Pass which is an affordable multi-mountain pass that promotes visitation to smaller resorts around the U.S.

== Summer ==
Catamount offers three summer activities: an aerial adventure park, zipline tour, and scenic chairlift rides.

The Catamount aerial adventure park is one of the largest aerial parks in New England. It features 9 courses of varying difficulty with over 150 elements ranging from bridges, ladders, ziplines, and more. Tickets are valid for 3 hours.

The Catamount "Catamonster" zipline tour is one of the longest dual span ziplines in the United States, at just over 1 mile long. The tour includes three dual-zipline spans and a chairlift ride up the mountain. The zipline features a braking system to control the speed of the zipline, which can reach up to 55+ mph. The speed record for the Catamonster is 93.6 mph set by a staff member.

Catamount also sells 3 packs of aerial adventure park tickets and combo tickets for the aerial adventure park and zipline tour.

Scenic chairlift rides take the Ridge Quad up to the summit, which has views of the Berkshires and Hudson Valley.

== Trails ==
- Skiable area: 119 acres (0.48 km^{2})
- 44 trails
- Longest trail – 2.5 miles (4.0 km) Ridge Run to Upper Promenade to Lower Promenade

36 of the 44 trails have snowmaking.

Easier	More Difficult	Most Difficult	Expert
Ali's Alley (n)	Upper Alley Cat (n)	Expressway (ns)	Catapult (m)
Birch Cathedral (ns)	Bobcat (n, tp)	Lower Alley Cat (n, rs)	Christopher's Leap
Cat's Meow (n)	Birch Glade (ns)	Lower Glade (m)	Lynx (m, ns)
Colonel's Caper (n, night skiing only on the upper part)	Catamount (n)	Marty's Run	Ripper
Echo's Run	Chute (n)	Off Stage (m)	
Esplanade (n)	Fisher's Fluke	Upper Glade	
Holiday (n)	Lookout (ns)		
Homeward Bound (n)	Lower Sidewinder		
Kelli's Run (n)	Mountain View (n)		
Lauren's Run	On Stage (n)		
Lower Promenade (n)	Pop-Up Park (n, tp)		
Ridge Run (n)	Toni Matt (n, rs)		
Ridge Run Ext. (n)	Shawenon		
Snow Sports Learning Area (n)	Sunrise (ns)		
Spencer's Way (ns)	Turnpike (ns)		
Upper Promenade (n)	Upper Bobcat (n)		
	Upper Sidewinder (n)		
	Walter's Way (n)		

- (n) – Night skiing (on Wed, Thu, Fri, Sat, and some holidays)
- (ns) – No snowmaking
- (tp) – Terrain park
- (m) – Normally has moguls when open
- (rs) - Race slope

== History of trails ==
Season	Easier	Easier-More Difficult	More Difficult	More Difficult-Most Difficult	Most Difficult	Expert
2025-2026	Ali's Alley, Birch Cathedral, Cat's Meow, Colonel's Caper, Echo's Run, Esplanade, Holiday, Homeward Bound, Kelli's Run, Lauren's Run, Lower Promenade, Ridge Run, Ridge Run Extension, Snow Sports Learning Area, Spencer's Way, Upper Promenade		Bobcat, Birch Glade,Catamount, Chute, Fisher's Fluke, Lookout, Lower Sidewinder, Mountain View, On Stage, Pop-Up Park, Shawenon, Sunrise, Toni Matt, Upper Alley Cat, Upper Bobcat, Upper Sidewinder, Walter's Way		Expressway, Lower Alley Cat, Lower Glade, Marty's Run, Off Stage, Upper Glade	Catapult, Christopher's Leap, Lynx, Ripper
2024-2025	Ali's Alley, Birch Cathedral, Cat's Meow, Colonel's Caper, Echo's Run, Esplanade, Holiday, Homeward Bound, Kelli's Run, Lauren's Run, Lower Promenade, Ridge Run, Ridge Run Extension, Snow Sports Learning Area, Spencer's Way, Upper Promenade		Bobcat, Birch Glade, Catamount, Chute, Fisher's Fluke, Lookout, Lower Sidewinder, Mountain View, On Stage, Panther Park, Shawenon, Sunrise, Toni Matt, Turnpike, Upper Alley Cat, Upper Bobcat, Upper Sidewinder, Walter's Way		Expressway, Lower Alley Cat, Lower Glade, Marty's Run, Off Stage, Upper Glade	Catapult, Christopher's Leap, Lynx, Ripper
2023-2024	Ali's Alley, Birch Cathedral, Cat's Meow, Colonel's Caper, Echo's Run, Esplanade, Holiday, Homeward Bound, Kelli's Run, Lauren's Run, Lower Promenade, Ridge Run, Ridge Run Extension, Snow Sports Learning Area, Spencer's Way, Upper Promenade		Bobcat, Birch Glade, Catamount, Chute, Fisher's Fluke, Lookout, Lower Sidewinder, Mountain View, On Stage, Panther Park, Race Slope, Shawenon, Sunrise, Turnpike, Upper Alley Cat, Upper Bobcat, Upper Sidewinder, Walter's Way		Expressway, Lower Alley Cat, Lower Glade, Marty's Run, Off Stage, Upper Glade	Catapult, Christopher's Leap, Lynx, Ripper
2022-2023	Ali's Alley, Birch Cathedral, Cat's Meow, Colonel's Caper, Echo's Run, Esplanade, Holiday, Homeward Bound, Kelli's Run, Lauren's Run, Lower Promenade, Ridge Run, Ridge Run Extension, Snow Sports Learning Area, Spencer's Way, Upper Promenade		Bobcat, Birch Glade, Catamount, Chute, Fisher's Fluke, Lookout, Lower Sidewinder, Mountain View, On Stage, Panther Park, Race Slope, Shawenon, Sunrise, Turnpike, Upper Alley Cat, Upper Bobcat, Upper Sidewinder, Walter's Way		Expressway, Lower Alley Cat, Lower Glade, Marty's Run, Off Stage, Upper Glade	Catapult, Christopher's Leap, Lynx, Ripper
2021-2022	Ali's Alley, Birch Cathedral, Cat's Meow, Colonel's Caper, Echo's Run, Esplanade, Holiday, Kelli's Run, Lauren's Run, Lower Promenade, Ridge Run, Ridge Run Extension, Snow Sports Learning Area, Spencer's Way, Upper Promenade		Bobcat, Birch Glade, Catamount, Chute, Fisher's Fluke, Lookout, Lower Sidewinder, Mountain View, On Stage, Panther Park, Race Slope, Shawenon, Sunrise, Turnpike, Upper Alley Cat, Upper Sidewinder, Walter's Way		Expressway, Lower Alley Cat, Lower Glade, Marty's Run, Off Stage, Upper Glade	Catapult, Christopher's Leap, Lynx, Ripper
2020-2021	Ali's Alley, Birch Cathedral, Colonel's Caper, Echo's Run, Esplanade, Holiday, Kelli's Run, Lauren's Run, Lower Promenade, Ridge Run, Ridge Run Extension, Snow Sports Learning Area, Spencer's Way, Upper Promenade		Bobcat, Birch Glade, Catamount, Chute, Fisher's Fluke, Lookout, Lower Sidewinder, Mountain View, On Stage, Panther Park, Race Slope, Shawenon, Sunrise, Turnpike, Upper Alley Cat, Upper Sidewinder, Walter's Way		Expressway, Lower Alley Cat, Lower Glade, Marty's Run, Off Stage, Upper Glade	Catapult, Christopher's Leap, Lynx, Ripper
2019-2020	Ali's Alley, Birch Cathedral, Cat's Meow, Colonel's Caper, Echo's Run, Esplanade, Holiday, Kelli's Run, Kid Cats, Lauren's Run, Lower Promenade, Ridge Run, Ridge Run Extension, Snow Sports Learning Area, Spencer's Way, Upper Promenade		Bobcat, Birch Glade, Catamount, Chute, Fisher's Fluke, Lower Sidewinder, Mountain View, On Stage, Panther Park, Race Slope, Shawenon, Sunrise, Turnpike, Upper Alley Cat, Upper Sidewinder, Upper Turnpike, Walter's Way		Expressway, Lower Alley Cat, Lower Glade, Marty's Run, Off Stage, Upper Glade	Catapult, Christopher's Leap, Lynx, Ripper
2018-2019	Ali's Alley, Birch Cathedral, Cat's Meow, Colonel's Caper, Echo's Run, Esplanade, Holiday, Kelli's Run, Kid Cats, Lauren's Run, Lower Promenade, Ridge Run, Ridge Run Extension, Snow Sports Learning Area, Spencer's Way, Upper Promenade		Bobcat, Birch Glade, Catamount, Chute, Fisher's Fluke, Lower Sidewinder, Mountain View, On Stage, Panther Park, Race Slope, Sunrise, Turnpike, Upper Alley Cat, Upper Sidewinder, Upper Turnpike, Walter's Way		Expressway, Lower Alley Cat, Lower Glade, Off Stage, Upper Glade	Catapult, Lynx
2017-2018	Ali's Alley, Birch Cathedral, Cat's Meow, Colonel's Caper, Esplanade, Holiday, Kelli's Run, Kid Cats, Lower Promenade, Ridge Run, Ridge Run Extension, Snow Sports Learning Area, Upper Promenade		Bobcat, Birch Glade, Catamount, Chute, Fisher's Fluke, Lower Sidewinder, Mountain View, On Stage, Panther Park, Race Slope, Sunrise, Turnpike, Upper Alley Cat, Upper Sidewinder, Upper Turnpike, Walter's Way		Expressway, Lower Alley Cat, Lower Glade, Off Stage, Upper Glade	Catapult, Lynx
2016-2017	Ali's Alley, Birch Cathedral, Cat's Meow, Colonel's Caper, Esplanade, Holiday, Kelli's Run, Kid Cats, Lower Promenade, Ridge Run, Ridge Run Extension, Snow Sports Learning Area, Upper Promenade		Bobcat, Birch Glades, Catamount, Chute, Fisher's Fluke, Lower Sidewinder, Mountain View, On Stage, Panther Park, Race Slope, Sunrise, Turnpike, Upper Alley Cat, Upper Sidewinder, Upper Turnpike, Walter's Way		Expressway, Lower Alley Cat, Lower Glade, Off Stage, Upper Glade	Catapult, Lynx
2015-2016	Ali's Alley, Birch Cathedral, Bobcat, Cat's Meow, Colonel's Caper, Esplanade, Holiday, Kelli's Run, Kid Cats, Lower Promenade, Snow Sports Learning Area, Upper Promenade	Ridge Run, Ridge Run Extension	Birch Glades, Catamount, Fisher's Fluke, Lower Sidewinder, Mountain View, On Stage, Panther Park, Race Slope, Sunrise, Upper Sidewinder, Walter's Way	Chute, Turnpike, Upper Turnpike	Expressway, Lower Alley Cat, Lower Glade, Off Stage, Upper Alley Cat, Upper Glade	Catapult, Lynx
2014-2015	Ali's Alley, Birch Cathedral, Bobcat, Cat's Meow, Colonel's Caper, Esplanade, Holiday, Kelli's Run, Kid Cats, Lower Promenade, Snow Sports Learning Area, Upper Promenade	Ridge Run	Catamount, Chute, Fisher's Fluke, Lower Sidewinder, Mountain View, On Stage, Panther Park, Race Slope, Sunrise, Upper Sidewinder, Walter's Way	Turnpike, Upper Turnpike	Expressway, Lower Alley Cat, Lower Glade, Off Stage, Terrain Park, Upper Alley Cat, Upper Glade	Catapult, Lynx
2013-2014	Ali's Alley, Birch Cathedral, Bobcat, Cat's Meow, Colonel's Caper, Esplanade, Holiday, Kelli's Run, Kid Cats, Lower Promenade, Snow Sports Learning Area, Upper Promenade		Catamount, Chute, Lower Sidewinder, Mountain View, On Stage, Panther Park, Race Slope, Ridge Run, Sunrise, Upper Sidewinder, Walter's Way	Turnpike, Upper Turnpike	Expressway, Lower Alley Cat, Lower Glade, Off Stage, Terrain Park, Upper Alley Cat, Upper Glade	Catapult, Lynx
2011-2012	Ali's Alley, Birch Cathedral, Cat's Meow, Colonel's Caper, Esplanade, Holiday, Kelli's Run, Lower Promenade, Snow Sports Learning Area, Upper Promenade		Catamount, Chute, Junior Jib Park, Lower Sidewinder, Mountain View, On Stage, Race Slope, Ridge Run, Sunrise, Upper Sidewinder, Walter's Way	Turnpike, Upper Turnpike	Expressway, Halfpipe, Lower Alley Cat, Lower Glade, Off Stage, Terrain Park, Upper Alley Cat, Upper Glade	Catapult
2009-2010	Ali's Alley, Birch Cathedral, Cat's Meow, Colonel's Caper, Esplanade, Holiday, Kelli's Run, Lower Promenade, Snow Sports Learning Area, Upper Promenade		Catamount, Chute, Junior Jib Park, Lower Sidewinder, Mountain View, On Stage, Race Slope, Ridge Run, Sunrise, Upper Sidewinder, Walter's Way	Turnpike, Upper Turnpike	Expressway, Halfpipe, Lower Alley Cat, Lower Glade, Off Stage, Terrain Park, Upper Alley Cat, Upper Glade	Catapult
2008-2009	Ali's Alley, Cat's Meow, Colonel's Caper, Esplanade, Holiday, Kelli's Run, Kid Cats, Lower Promenade, Snow Sports Learning Area, Upper Promenade		Catamount, Chute, Lower Sidewinder, Mountain View, On Stage, Race Slope, Ridge Run, Upper Sidewinder, Walter's Way	Turnpike, Upper Turnpike	Expressway, Halfpipe, Junior Jib Park, Lower Alley Cat, Lower Glade, Off Stage, Sunrise, Terrain Park, Upper Alley Cat, Upper Glade	Catapult
2006-2007	Ali's Alley, Cat's Meow, Colonel's Caper, Esplanade, Holiday, Kelli's Run, Kid Cats, Lower Promenade, Snow Sports Learning Area, Upper Promenade		Catamount, Chute, Lower Sidewinder, Mountain View, On Stage, Race Slope, Ridge Run, Upper Sidewinder, Walter's Way	Turnpike, Upper Turnpike	Expressway, Halfpipe, Junior Jib Park, Lower Alley Cat, Lower Glade, Off Stage, Sunrise, Terrain Park, Upper Alley Cat, Upper Glade	Catapult
2005-2006	Ali's Alley, Cat's Meow, Colonel's Caper, Esplanade, Holiday, Kelli's Run, Lower Promenade, Upper Promenade		Catamount, Chute, Lower Sidewinder, Mountain View, On Stage, Race Slope, Ridge Run, Sunrise, Upper Sidewinder, Walter's Way	Turnpike, Upper Turnpike	Expressway, Halfpipe, Lower Alley Cat, Lower Glade, Off Stage, Terrain Park, Upper Alley Cat, Upper Glade	Catapult
2002-2003	Ali's Alley, Cat's Meow, Colonel's Caper, Esplanade, Holiday, Kelli's Run, Promenade, Pussy Cat, Ski Wee		Chute, Lower Sidewinder, Mountain View, Off Stage, On Stage, Race Slope, Ridge Run, Upper Sidewinder, Walter's Way		Catamount, Half Pipe, Lower Alley Cat, Lower Glade, Snowboard Megaplex, Terrain Park, Upper Alley Cat, Upper Glade	Catapult
1999-2000	Ali's Alley, Cat's Meow, Colonel's Caper, Esplanade, Holiday, Kelli's Run, Molasses Hill, Promenade, Pussy Cat, Ski Wee		Chute, Mountain View, Off Stage, On Stage, Race Slope, Ridge Run, Upper Alley Cat, Walter's Way, Wax Run		Catamount, Lower Alley Cat, Lower Glade, Snowboard Park, Turnpike, Upper Glade	Catapult
1994-1995	Ali's Alley, Cat's Meow, Colonel's Caper, Esplanade, Holiday, Kelli's Run, Promenade, Pussy Cat		Chute, Mountain View, NASTAR, Off Stage, On Stage, Ridge Run, Upper Alley Cat, Walter's Way, Wax Run		Catamount, Lower Alley Cat, Lower Glade, Snowboard Park, Turnpike, Upper Glade	Catapult
1985-1986	Birch Cathedral, Cat's Meow, Colonel's Caper, Esplanade, Holiday, Kelli's Run, Meadows, Promenade, Pussycat		Cake Walk, Catamount, Fisher's Fluke, Mountain View, Nastar, Off Stage, On Stage, Ridge Run, Wax Run		Dipper, Flipper, Lower Glade, Turnpike, Upper Glade	Rifle Barrel
1980-1981	Birch Cathedral, Cat's Meow, Colonel's Caper, Esplanade, Holiday, Meadows, Promenade, Pussycat		Cake Walk, Catamount, Easy Street, Fisher's Fluke, Nastar, Off Stage, On Stage, Ridge Run, Wax Run		Chute, Dipper, Escalator, Flipper, Lower Glade, Upper Glade	Rifle Barrel
1970-1971	Birch Cathedral, Colonel's Caper, Esplanade, Holiday, Promenade		Catamount, Escalator, Fisher's Fluke, Ridge Run		Chute, Dipper, Glade, On Stage, Rifle Barrel	
1969-1970	Birch Cathedral, Colonel's Caper, Esplanade, Holiday, Promenade		Catamount, Escalator, Fisher's Fluke, Ridge Run		Chute, Dipper, Glade, On Stage, Wax Run	Rifle Barrel
1968-1969	Birch Cathedral, Colonel's Caper, Esplanade, Holiday, Promenade		Catamount, Escalator, Fisher's Fluke, Ridge Run		Chute, Dipper, Glade, On Stage, Wax Run	Rifle Barrel
1964-1965		Birch Cathedral, Colonel's Caper	Dipper, Escalator, Fisher's Fluke, Ridge Run	Chute, Rifle Barrel, Wax Run	Steeple	

== Lifts ==
There are eight total lifts at Catamount, all of which range in age, length, and value. Catamount was home to two of the last remaining SLI double chairlifts in the world, and the only two in the northeast. However, these chairlifts have been replaced with an all new triple and quad chairlift in the 2021/2022 season.

Surface Lifts
Name	Notes
Learning Area Carpet 1	Connect to fixed-grip triple pair.
Mountain Cats Carpet	Used for the Mountain Cats program.
Learning Area Carpet 2	Leaves access to Holiday on the left and one of the Snow Sports Learning Area trails on the right.

Fixed Grip Triples
Name	Manufacturer	Year Installed	Notes
Meadows Triple	CTEC-Thiokol	2006	Mid-station, from Solitude
Promenade Triple	Poma	2019	From Berkshire East then Magic Mountain
Glade Triple	Poma	2021	Brand new for 2021/2022 season!

Fixed Grip Quads
Name	Manufacturer	Year Installed	Notes
Ridge Quad	Garaventa-CTEC	2008	From Belleayre
Catamount Quad	Garaventa-CTEC	2021	Brand new for 2021/2022 season!

== Lodges ==
- Berkshire Lodge: The lodge is the original lodge and includes food services, tavern, restrooms, rentals, and seating. It is located to the left side of the Catamount Quad.
- Catamount Lodge: Opened in 2019, this is the new lodge that houses food services, offices, ticketing, shop, restrooms, and seating. It is located in front of the Mountain Cats carpet.
- Taconic Lodge: This is a temporary lodge with a shop, restrooms, and seating. It is located at the bottom of the mountain near the Ridge Quad.

== Snow sports school ==
Catamount operates a snow sports school that offers ski and snowboard instruction through daily lessons and season-long programs. According to the resort, its snow sports school includes instructors affiliated with the Professional Ski Instructors of America and the American Association of Snowboard Instructors (PSIA/AASI).

=== Seasonal children's programs ===
The resort advertises multiple season-long programs for children that are grouped by ability rather than age.

- Mountain Scouts – ages 5–10; introductory skiing/riding focused on chairlift use and linking turns
- Mountain Explorers – ages 5–13; ability to ride the Meadows Triple chairlift and navigate green terrain with controlled turns
- Mountain Adventurers – ages 5–13; ability to ride the Ridge Quad and Catamount Quad and navigate blue terrain
- Development Race Program – ages 6–11; for skiers interested in racing who can ride the Ridge Quad/Catamount Quad and ski blue terrain
- Freestyle – season-long freestyle-focused program for intermediate and expert participants
- Junior Instructor Training – ages 12–15; season-long program for aspiring ski/snowboard instructors

=== Daily lessons and packages ===
Catamount lists daily lesson options that include group lessons, private lessons, and children’s lessons, as well as packaged offerings such as a learn-to-ski/ride package and an adaptive program branded “STRIDE”. The resort also advertises a “Ski with an Olympian” program.

=== Adult programs and clinics ===
Adult-focused clinics advertised by the resort include “Weekend Warriors” and “Women’s Wednesdays”, along with a “Ski with an Olympian” option.

== Snow tubing ==
Catamount operates a snow tubing park during the winter season. The resort states that the tubing area includes multiple tubing lanes and uses a conveyor (“magic carpet”) lift to return riders to the top. Tickets are sold in timed sessions with limited capacity, and the resort recommends purchasing in advance online. Catamount also requires participants to complete a waiver before arrival and lists eligibility and safety rules for riders (including minimum height and single-rider tube restrictions).

== Alpine racing ==
Catamount operates an alpine race team program for children focused on ski racing training and competition. The program is led by former Slovenian Olympic alpine skier Urška Rabič. The resort lists multiple race-team tracks, including an interclub program and a tri-state program, and also advertises race-related experiences and camps offered through the program.

=== Programs ===
Sources:

- Interclub Race Program
- Tri-State Race Program
- Ski With an Olympian Program
- Mt. Hood Camps
- Loveland Camps
- Zermatt Switzerland Camps

== Uphill travel ==
Catamount permits uphill travel (such as skinning and snowshoeing) on designated routes during the winter season, subject to resort rules and operating restrictions. The resort states that uphill users must follow a published policy, including route guidance, timing limitations, and safety requirements intended to separate uphill traffic from active downhill operations and grooming.

== Seasonal lockers ==
Catamount offers seasonal locker rentals for winter guests. The resort states that lockers are available in multiple sizes and are located in on-mountain locker facilities, with rentals offered for the duration of the ski season and access governed by resort policies and availability.

== Equipment rentals ==
Catamount operates an on-site equipment rental program for winter guests. According to the resort, rental offerings include skis, snowboards, and related equipment, with rental packages available for different ability levels and age groups. The resort also provides fitting and pickup services through its rental shop and advises guests to reserve rentals in advance during peak periods.

== Tuning and repair ==
Catamount offers ski and snowboard tuning and repair services through its winter operations. The resort advertises shop services such as edge and base work, waxing, and equipment repairs, with service availability and turnaround times varying by season and demand.

== Lodging ==
Catamount promotes nearby lodging options for visitors, including partner accommodations in the surrounding Berkshire and Hudson Valley region. The resort’s lodging information is presented as a guide for guests planning multi-day trips, with reservations typically handled through the individual lodging providers rather than the resort.

== Food and beverage ==
Catamount operates on-site food and beverage service for guests during the winter season and for select events. The resort advertises dining options located at the base area and in on-mountain facilities, along with bar service and event catering as part of its group and private-event offerings.

== Weddings and private events ==
Catamount hosts weddings and private events as part of its group sales and events offerings. According to the resort, wedding services can include use of on-site venues for ceremonies and receptions, along with event coordination and food-and-beverage service arranged through Catamount.
