= Bash Bish Falls State Park =

State park in Massachusetts, United States

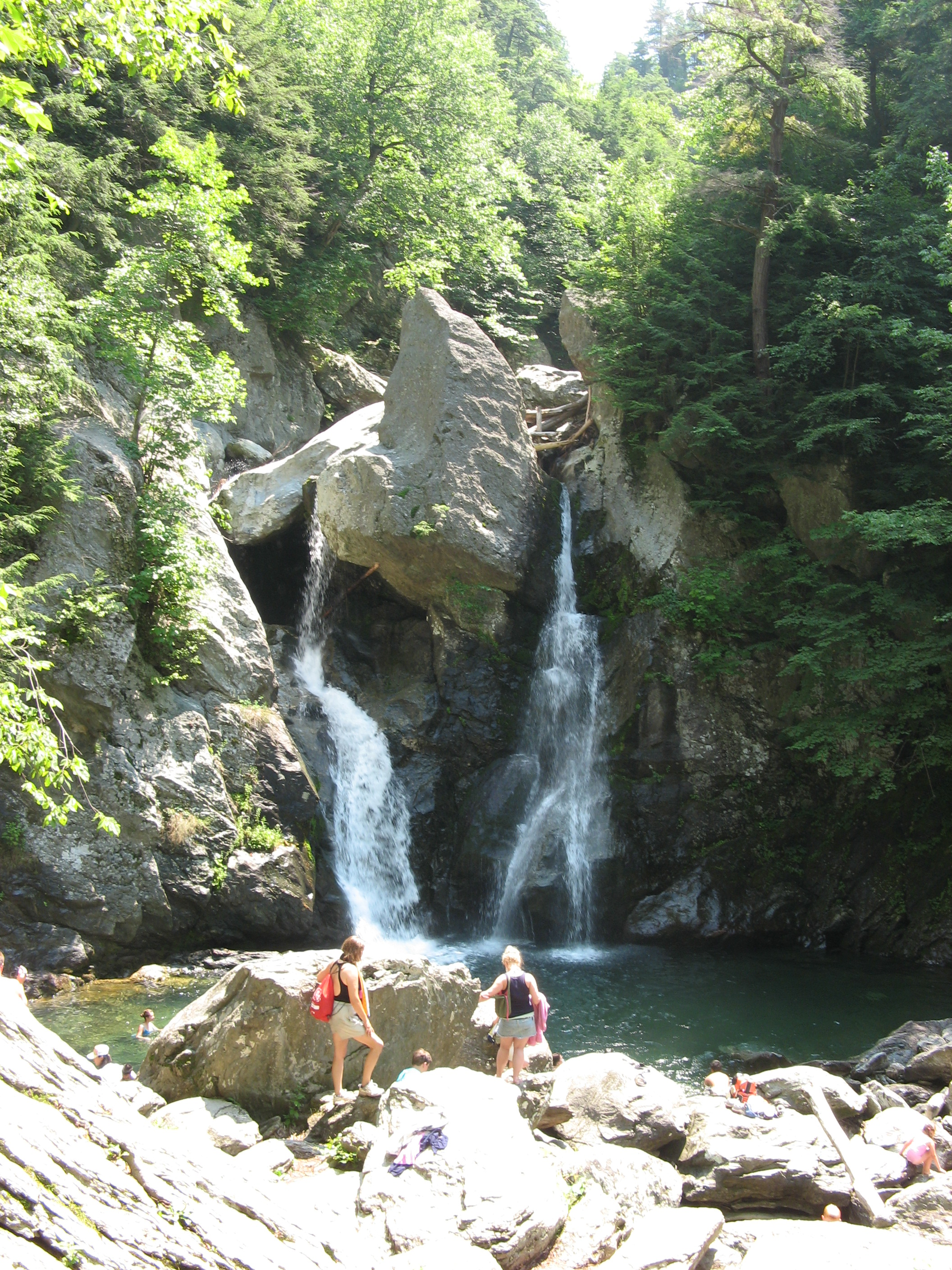

- Location within Massachusetts Location within the United States
- Interactive map of Bash Bish Falls State Park
- Location: Mount Washington, Massachusetts, United States
- Coordinates: 42°06′53″N 73°29′34″W
- Area: 424 acres (172 ha)
- Elevation: 1,132 ft (345 m)
- Established: 1924
- Administrator: Massachusetts Department of Conservation and Recreation
- Website: Official website

Bash Bish Falls State Park is a Massachusetts state park located in the town of Mount Washington. The park is named after Bash Bish Falls, Massachusetts' highest single-drop waterfall (60 feet (18 m)), which lies within its borders. The park is managed by the Department of Conservation and Recreation and is one of several nature preserves in the extreme southwestern corner of Massachusetts noted for their scenery. It is adjacent to the 4,000-acre (1,600 ha) Mount Washington State Forest, as well as New York's 5,000-acre (2,000 ha) Taconic State Park.

Bash Bish State Park consists of numerous gorges and an eastern hemlock ravine forest. The slopes around the waterfall are covered by forests of trees such as maple, oak, and beech. Wildlife includes the timber rattlesnake, the peregrine falcon, bobcats, black bears, and porcupines.

== Activities and amenities ==
The park's recreational opportunities include scenic viewing, hiking, and fishing. To ensure public safety entering the water, swimming and rock climbing are prohibited. Leashed dogs are allowed on the trail and at the falls. The falls can be reached via a moderately strenuous, half-mile, downhill trail. In all, there are three parking areas with trails of different lengths that provide access to the falls. The park is open from dawn to dusk.
