= Mount Washington, Massachusetts =

- Town
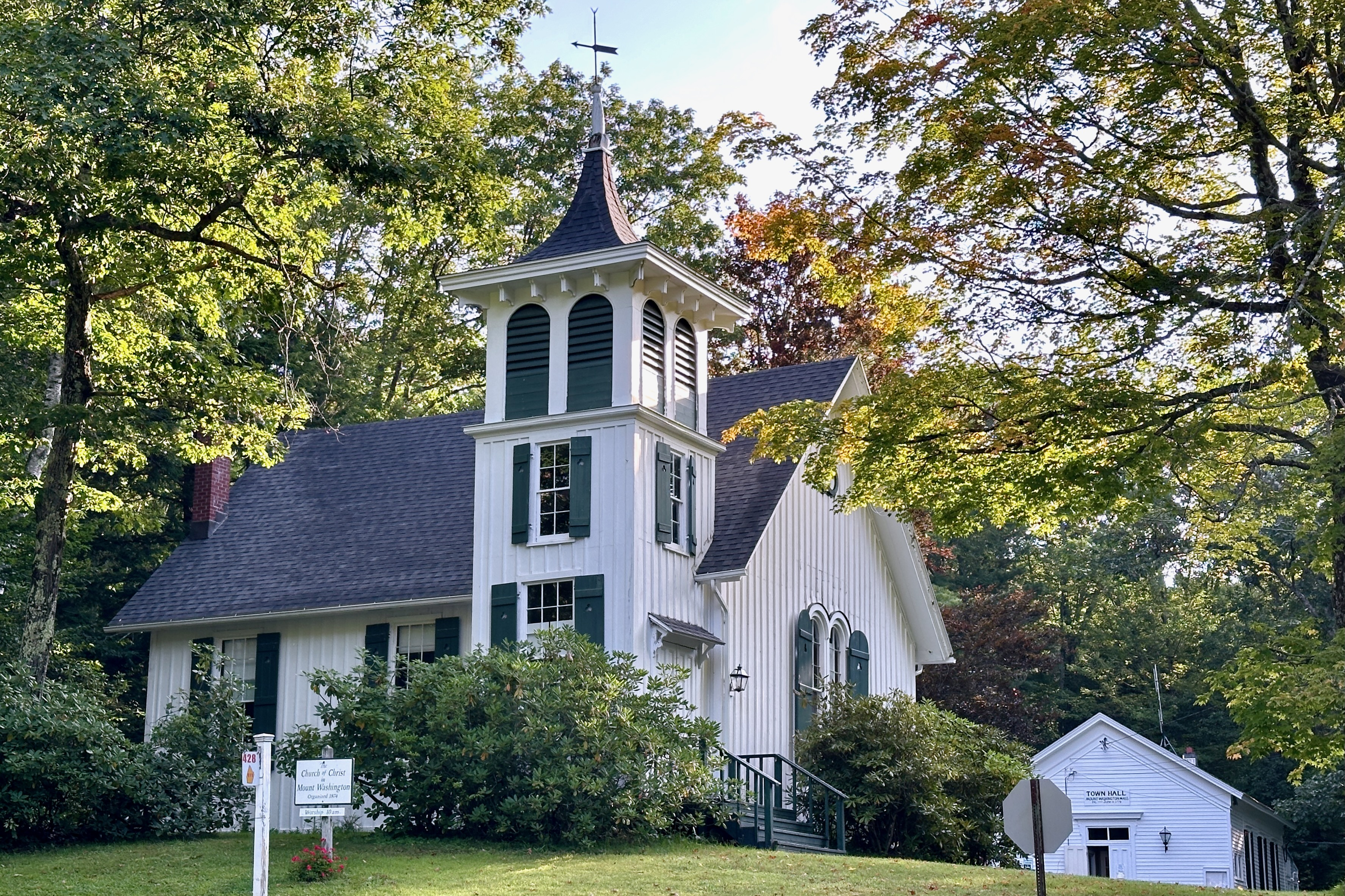
- The town church and town hall

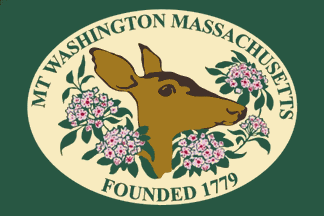
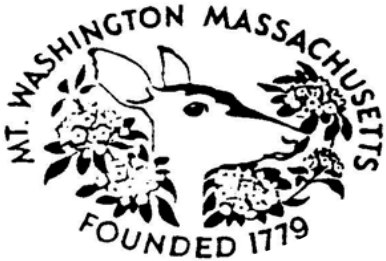
- Flag Seal
- Nickname: The Town Among the Clouds
- Location in Berkshire County and Massachusetts.
- Coordinates: 42°05′00″N 73°27′00″W
- Country: United States
- State: Massachusetts
- County: Berkshire
- Settled: 1692
- Incorporated: 1779

Government
  - Type: Open town meeting

Area
  - Total: 22.4 sq mi (57.9 km^{2})
  - Land: 22.2 sq mi (57.5 km^{2})
  - Water: 0.15 sq mi (0.4 km^{2})
- Elevation: 1,631 ft (497 m)

Population (2020)
  - Total: 160
  - Density: 7.2/sq mi (2.8/km^{2})
- Time zone: UTC-5 (Eastern)
  - Summer (DST): UTC-4 (Eastern)
- ZIP code: 01258
- Area code: 413
- FIPS code: 25-43300
- GNIS feature ID: 0618271
- Website: mountwashington-ma.gov

Mount Washington is a town in Berkshire County, Massachusetts, United States. It is part of the Pittsfield, Massachusetts Metropolitan Statistical Area. It lies at the very southwestern corner of Massachusetts, bordering New York State and Salisbury, Connecticut.

The population was 160 at the 2020 census, making it the least populous town in Berkshire County and, after Gosnold and Monroe, the third least populous in Massachusetts. The name of the town is a tribute to George Washington, who at the time of incorporation was Commander-in-Chief of the Continental Army during the American Revolutionary War.

== History ==
Mount Washington was first settled by Europeans in 1692 and was officially incorporated in 1779.

== Geography ==
According to the United States Census Bureau, the town has a total area of 22.4 square miles (57.9 km^{2}), of which 22.2 square miles (57.5 km^{2}) is land and 0.15 square miles (0.4 km^{2}), or 0.67%, is water.

Mount Washington is the westernmost and southwesternmost town in Massachusetts. The district of Boston Corner, to the southwest of Mount Washington, was formerly the southwesternmost location in Massachusetts, but it was ceded to New York in 1855 due to its geographical inaccessibility from the rest of Massachusetts.

The town is bordered on the west by Columbia County, New York, on a half-mile portion of its southern border by Dutchess County, New York, and on the rest of the southern border by Litchfield County, Connecticut. It is bordered on the north by Egremont, on the east by Sheffield, on the south by Salisbury, Connecticut, on the southwest by the Whitehouse Crossing section of North East, New York, and on the west by Ancram and Copake, New York. Mount Washington is 33 miles (53 km) south-southwest of Pittsfield, 58 miles (93 km) west of Springfield, and 148 miles (238 km) west-southwest of Boston.

Mount Washington is located on a plateau in the Taconic Mountains. To the east, Mount Everett, the highest point in town and the highest point in the southern Taconic Mountains, rises 2,602 feet (793 m) near the town's eastern border. To the north, several mountains and hills lie along the Egremont town line. Alander Mountain and the western escarpment of the southern Taconic Mountains lie along the western border of Mount Washington at the Columbia County, New York line. To the south, along the Connecticut border, stands another series of peaks including Mount Frissell. Although the summit of this mountain rests within the town of Mount Washington, its southern slope is located in Connecticut and is that state's highest elevation. Many brooks lie within the town, most of which feed into Roeliff Jansen Kill in Copake, New York. Mount Washington State Forest makes up a large portion of the town, as does Mount Everett State Reservation. The town is also home to Bash Bish Falls State Park, which is centered around its eponymous falls. The Appalachian Trail enters Massachusetts in Mount Washington, coming from Bear Mountain, then turning east before following near the eastern town border, over Mount Race and Mount Everett, before heading into Egremont.

Mount Washington is remote, with only four roads that lead out of the town, and only one, East Street, connected to the rest of Massachusetts via Egremont. There are no state roads within the town, with only New York State Route 344 entering the town, primarily as access to Bash Bish Falls from Route 22. The nearest state route in Massachusetts accessible to the town is Route 23 in Egremont. The nearest interstate, Interstate 90 (the Massachusetts Turnpike), is several miles north of the town, with the nearest exit, the "turn-around" exit 1, being in West Stockbridge. The nearest rail, bus and small airplane service are in Great Barrington, and the nearest national air service is at Bradley International Airport in Windsor Locks, Connecticut.

== Demographics ==
Historical population
Year	Pop.	±%
1790	261	—
1850	351	+34.5%
1860	321	−8.5%
1870	256	−20.2%
1880	205	−19.9%
1890	418	+103.9%
1900	122	−70.8%
1910	110	−9.8%
1920	73	−33.6%
1930	60	−17.8%
1940	57	−5.0%
1950	34	−40.4%
1960	34	+0.0%
1970	52	+52.9%
1980	93	+78.8%
1990	135	+45.2%
2000	130	−3.7%
2010	167	+28.5%
2020	160	−4.2%
2024*	157	−1.9%
* = population estimate. Source: United States census records and Population Estimates Program data.

As of the census of 2000, there were 130 people, 64 households, and 36 families residing in the town. The town is the smallest town of the 32 cities and towns in Berkshire County, and the third-smallest of the 351 cities and towns in Massachusetts (only Monroe and Gosnold are smaller). The population density was 5.8 people per square mile (2.3/km^{2}), the most sparsely populated town in the county and Commonwealth. There were 128 housing units at an average density of 5.8 per square mile (2.2/km^{2}). The racial makeup of the town was 100.00% White.

There were 64 households, out of which 15.6% had children under the age of 18 living with them, 48.4% were married couples living together, 4.7% had a female householder with no husband present, and 42.2% were non-families. 37.5% of all households were made up of individuals, and 10.9% had someone living alone who was 65 years of age or older. The average household size was 2.03 and the average family size was 2.70.

In the town, the population was spread out, with 16.9% under the age of 18, 2.3% from 18 to 24, 21.5% from 25 to 44, 43.8% from 45 to 64, and 15.4% who were 65 years of age or older. The median age was 52 years. For every 100 females, there were 109.7 males. For every 100 females age 18 and over, there were 103.8 males.

The median income for a household in the town was $53,125, and the median income for a family was $55,750. Males had a median income of $40,417 versus $31,250 for females. The per capita income for the town was $50,149. the highest in Berkshire County and the highest of any town in the four counties that make up Western Massachusetts. There were 4.5% of families and 8.2% of the population living below the poverty line, including no under eighteens and none of those over 64.

== Government ==
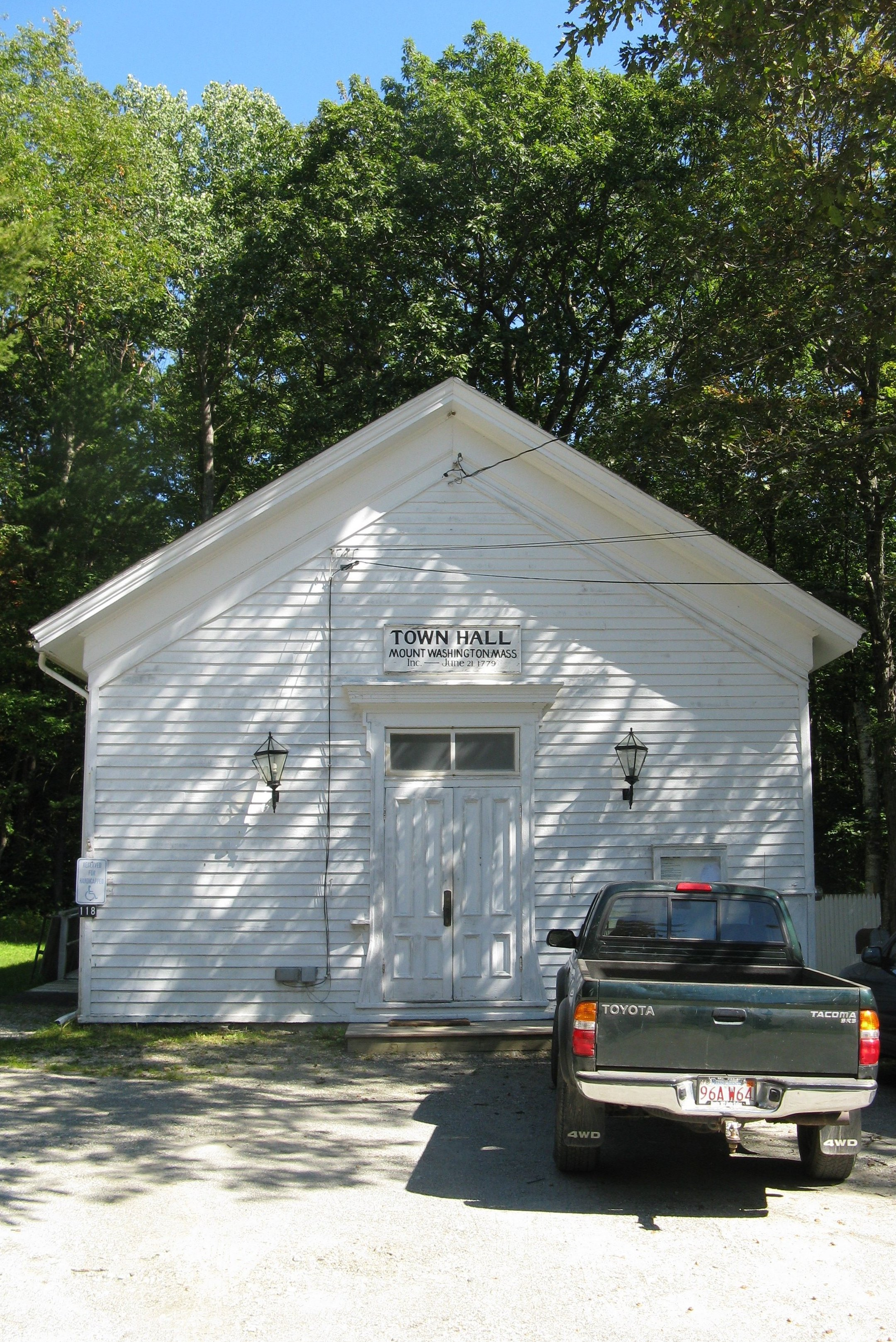
Town hall

Mount Washington employs the open town meeting form of government, and is led by a board of selectmen and administrative assistant. The town has no post office (it is served by the Egremont post office). The town has a small library which is connected to the regional library system.

On the state level, Mount Washington is represented in the Massachusetts House of Representatives by the Third Berkshire district, which covers southern Berkshire County. In the Massachusetts Senate, the town is represented by the Berkshire, Hampden, Franklin and Hampshire district. The town is patrolled by Troop B (B-1 Lee) of the Massachusetts State Police.

On the national level, Mount Washington is represented in the United States House of Representatives as part of Massachusetts's 1st congressional district, and has been represented by Richard Neal of Springfield since January 2013. Massachusetts is currently represented in the United States Senate by senior Senator Elizabeth Warren and junior senator Ed Markey.

Mount Washington presidential election results
Year	Democratic	Republican	Third parties	Total Votes	Margin
2024	76.86% 93	19.01% 23	4.13% 5	121	57.85%
2020	81.60% 102	12.80% 16	5.60% 7	125	68.80%
2016	71.70% 76	17.92% 19	10.38% 11	106	53.77%
2012	76.85% 83	17.59% 19	5.56% 6	108	59.26%
2008	77.78% 91	17.95% 21	4.27% 5	117	59.83%
2004	71.03% 76	23.36% 25	5.61% 6	107	47.66%
2000	68.67% 57	22.89% 19	8.43% 7	83	45.78%
1996	53.42% 39	28.77% 21	17.81% 13	73	24.66%
1992	47.73% 42	27.27% 24	25.00% 22	88	20.45%
1988	34.33% 23	59.70% 40	5.97% 4	67	25.37%
1984	22.58% 14	75.81% 47	1.61% 1	62	53.23%
1980	12.73% 7	60.00% 33	27.27% 15	55	47.27%
1976	27.59% 16	72.41% 42	0.00% 0	58	44.83%
1972	23.40% 11	76.60% 36	0.00% 0	47	53.19%
1968	12.90% 4	64.52% 20	22.58% 7	31	51.61%
1964	60.61% 20	39.39% 13	0.00% 0	33	21.21%
1960	34.29% 12	65.71% 23	0.00% 0	35	31.43%
1956	15.38% 4	84.62% 22	0.00% 0	26	69.23%
1952	17.65% 6	82.35% 28	0.00% 0	34	64.71%
1948	26.32% 10	73.68% 28	0.00% 0	38	47.37%
1944	21.62% 8	78.38% 29	0.00% 0	37	56.76%
1940	23.81% 10	76.19% 32	0.00% 0	42	52.38%

== Education ==
Mount Washington has its own non-operating school district although its children are educated in the Southern Berkshire Regional School District consisting of Alford, Egremont, Monterey, New Marlborough, and Sheffield. Students in Alford, Egremont and Mount Washington attend the Appalachian School for kindergarten and first grades, with second through sixth grades attending the Undermountain Elementary School in Sheffield, and Mount Everett Regional High School in Sheffield for grades 7–12. Additionally, there are private schools in Sheffield, Great Barrington and Salisbury, Connecticut.

The nearest community college is the South County Center of Berkshire Community College in Great Barrington. The nearest state college is Westfield State University. The nearest private college is Williams College in Williamstown.

== Notable events ==
An ongoing tradition taking place in Mount Washington for more than eighty-five years is its annual Church Fair. On the first Saturday in August, the townspeople of Mount Washington have come together for decades to work as a community to raise money for charity.
