= Mount Washington State Forest =

Protected area in Massachusetts, United States

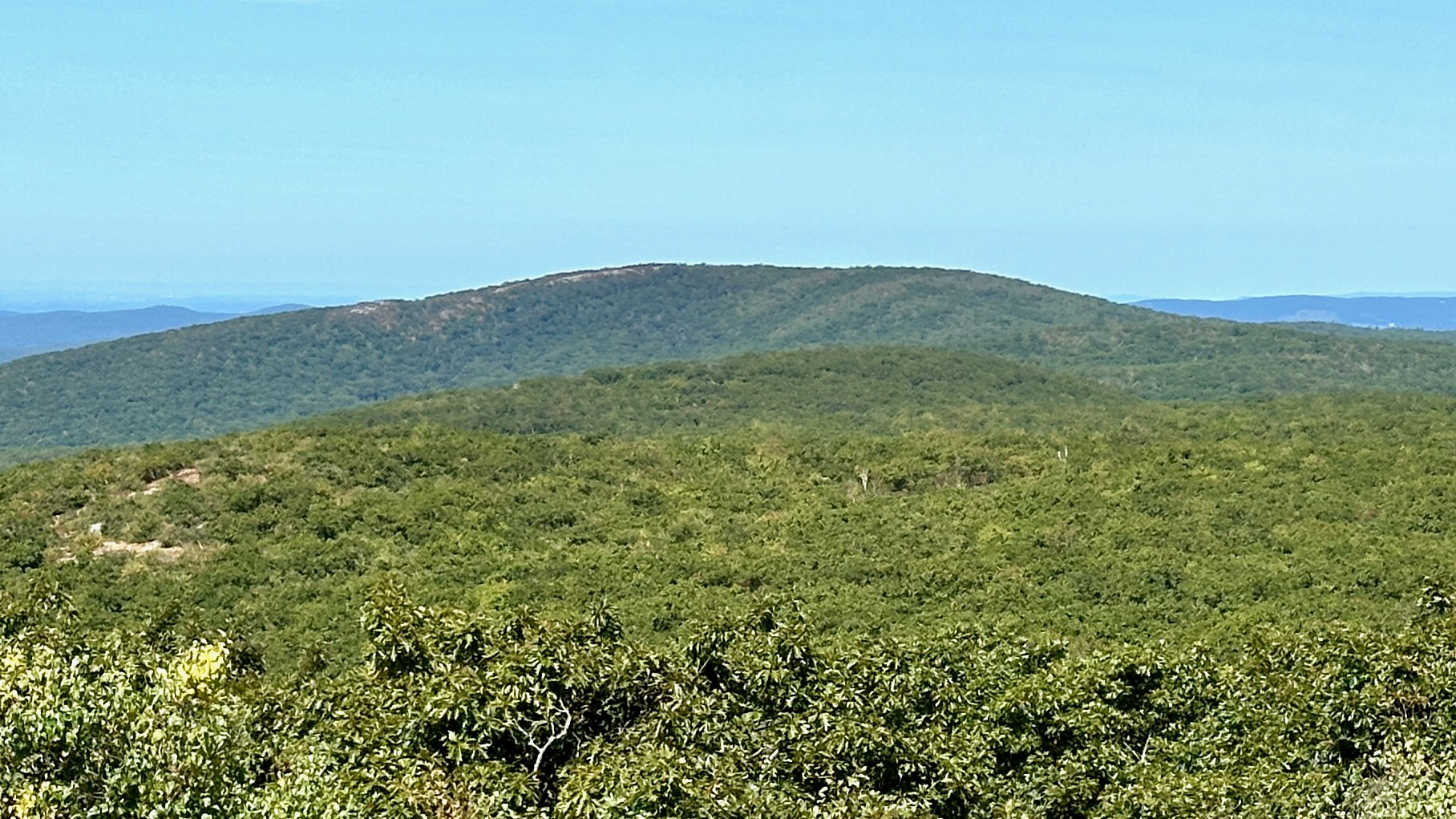
- Alander Mountain in Mount Washington State Forest

- Location within Massachusetts Location within the United States
- Location: Mount Washington, Massachusetts, United States
- Coordinates: 42°05′16″N 73°30′16″W
- Area: 4,619 acres (18.69 km^{2})
- Elevation: 2,241 ft (683 m)
- Established: 1958
- Administrator: Massachusetts Department of Conservation and Recreation
- Website: Official website

Mount Washington State Forest is a 4,619-acre (1,869 ha) state forest in Mount Washington, Massachusetts. The forest conjoins with New York state and the state of Connecticut in the southern Taconic Mountains of the southwestern Berkshire region of Massachusetts. In addition to offering recreational and scenic opportunities, the forest lies adjacent to Bash Bish Falls State Park. It is managed by the Massachusetts Department of Conservation and Recreation.

== History ==
The forest was acquired by the state through gifts of Alfred F. Intemann (1897–1986) and his wife Cornelia Van der Smissen Intemann (who died in 1963) conveyed in 1958, 1959, 1961, and 1968.

== Features ==
The forest protects 300 acres (120 ha) of old growth northern hardwood forest in separate areas. The tri-state boundary stone on the Mount Frissell Trail marks Massachusett's southwest and Connecticut's northwest corners. The names of Massachusetts and New York are engraved in the stone, while Connecticut is "graffitied" on the granite.

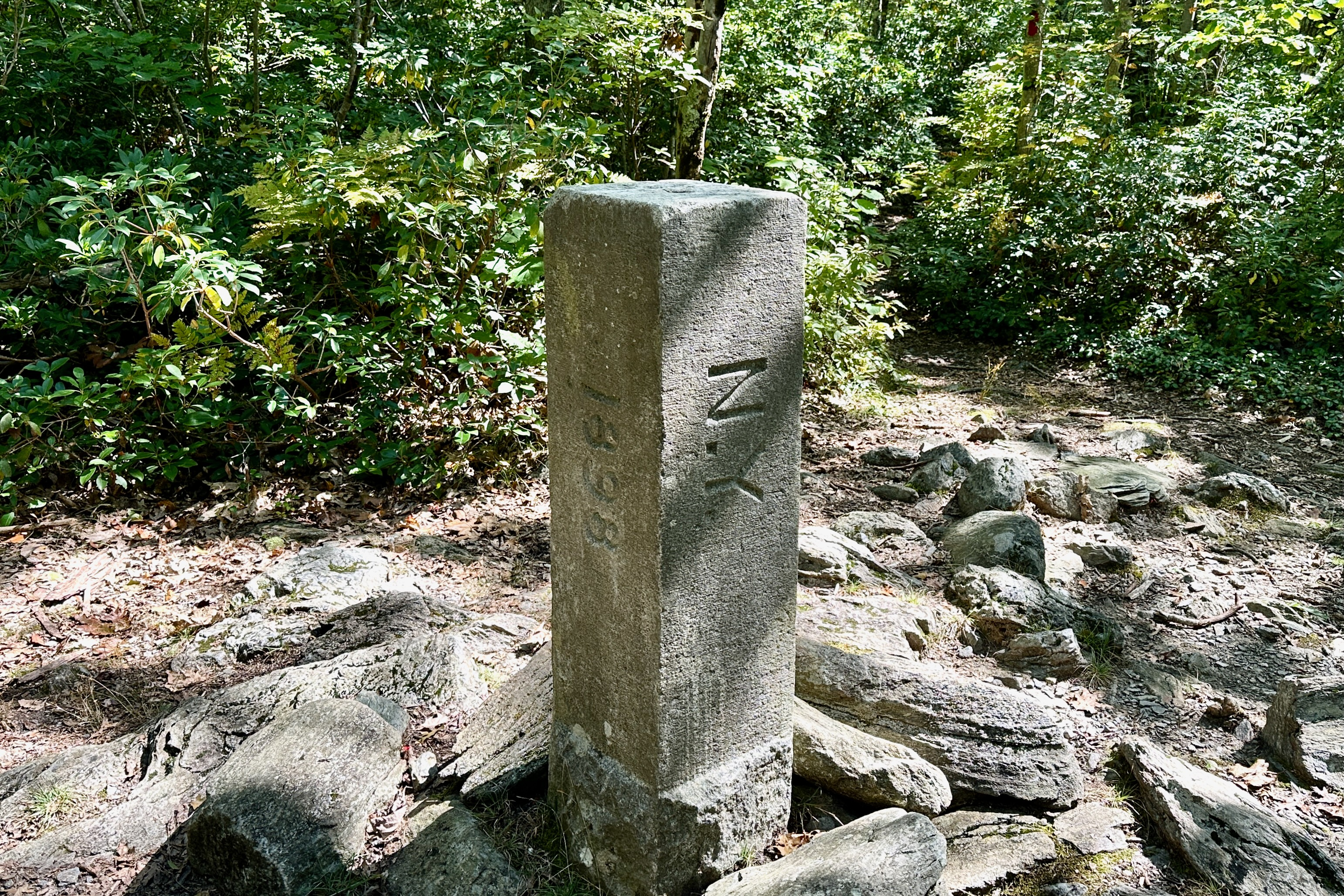
The Mount Frissell Trail passing the Connecticut–Massachusetts–New York tri-state monument

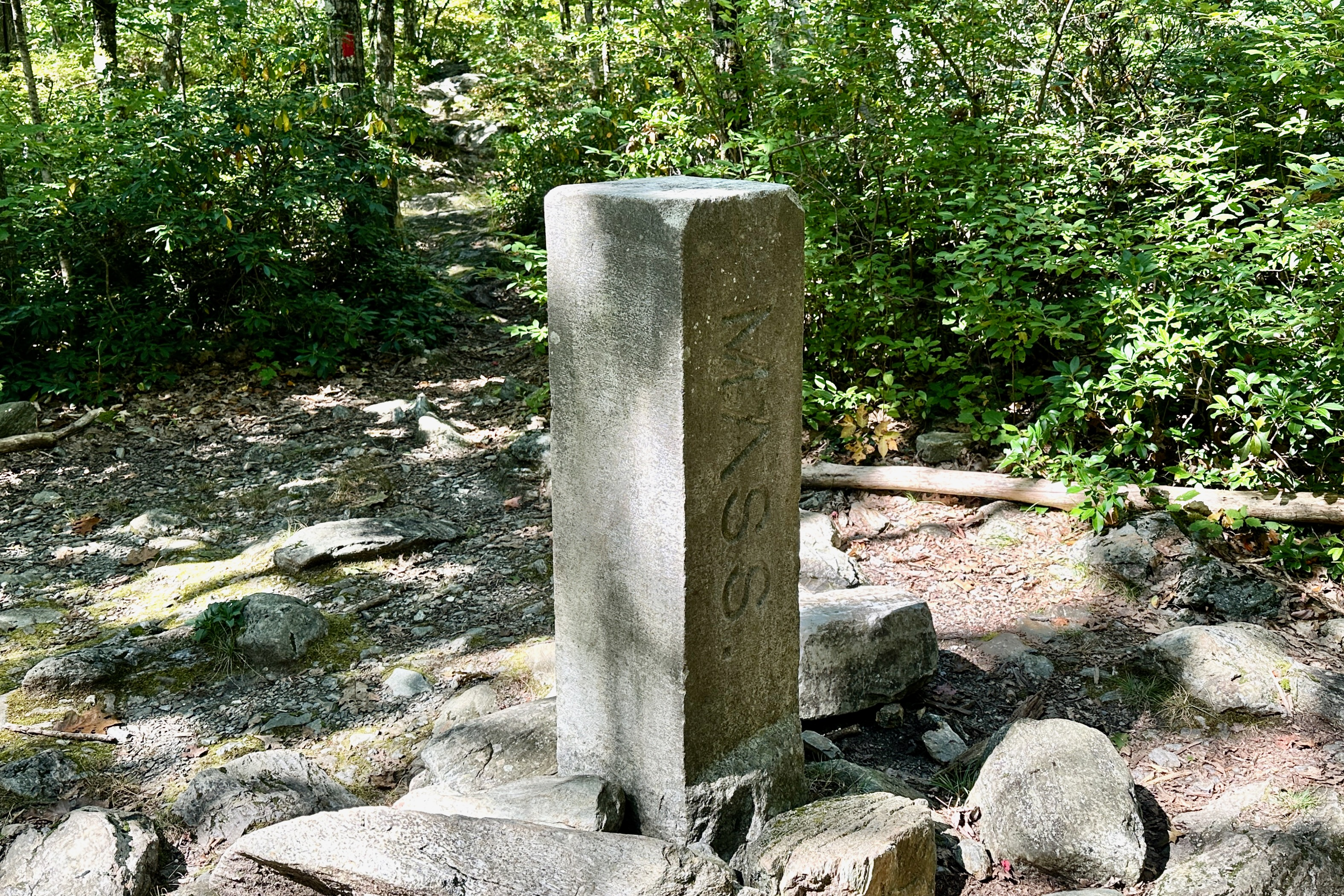
Other side of the monument with a blank face for Connecticut

== Activities and amenities ==
The forest has 30 miles of trails including portions of the Appalachian Trail and the South Taconic Trail, which ascends Alander Mountain. Trails are used for hiking, horseback riding, mountain biking, and cross-country skiing. The forest also offers restrooms, picnicking, fishing, restricted hunting, and primitive wilderness camping.
