= Berry Mountain =

Mountain in Berkshire County, Massachusetts, U.S.

Highest point
- Elevation: 2,203 ft (671 m)
- Coordinates: East peak 42.50216°N 73.31533°W; West peak, 42.50403°N 73.32254°W

Geography
- Location: Berkshire County, Massachusetts
- Parent range: Taconic Mountains

Geology
- Rock age: Ordovician
- Mountain type(s): Thrust fault; metamorphic rock and sedimentary rock

Climbing
- Easiest route: Taconic Crest Trail and Taconic Skyline Trail

Berry Mountain, east peak 2,203 feet (671 m) and west peak 2,188 feet (667 m), is a prominent mountain in the Taconic Mountains of western Massachusetts. The mountain is located in Pittsfield State Forest. The west peak is traversed by the 35 mi (56 km) Taconic Crest hiking trail and the east peak is traversed by the 12.1 mi (19.5 km) multi-use Taconic Skyline Trail. The summits are mostly wooded with northern hardwood forest species, but also support a 65-acre (260,000 m^{2}) field of wild azaleas. A microwave tower stands on the east peak. A park loop automobile road and a campground, maintained for summer use, are located just to the north of the summits. Berry Pond, 2,150 feet (660 m), presumed the highest natural pond in the state of Massachusetts, is located on the ridge between Berry Mountain and Berry Hill to the north.

The west side and summits of Berry Mountain are located within Hancock, Massachusetts; the east slopes are located within Pittsfield. The ridgeline continues south from Berry Mountain as Pine Mountain and Tower Mountain; it continues north as Berry Hill. Berry Mountain is bordered by West Hill to the west across the Wyomanock Creek valley. The west side of the mountain drains into Berry Pond Creek, then Wyomanock Creek, thence into Kinderhook Creek, the Hudson River and Long Island Sound. The east side drains into Lulu Creek and Parker Brook, thence into Onota Lake, the Housatonic River, and Long Island Sound.
