= Berry Hill (Taconic Mountains) =

Mountain in Massachusetts, United States

Highest point
- Elevation: 2,200 ft (670 m)
- Parent peak: N 42.50941 W 73.31803
- Coordinates: 42.50941°N 73.31803°W

Geography
- Location: Berkshire County, Massachusetts
- Parent range: Taconic Mountains

Geology
- Rock age: Ordovician
- Mountain type(s): Thrust fault; metamorphic rock and sedimentary rock

Climbing
- Easiest route: Park loop road and short trail

Berry Hill, 2,200 feet (670 m), is a prominent mountain in the Taconic Mountains of western Massachusetts. The mountain is located in Pittsfield State Forest and is traversed by a short spur trail from a park automobile road. The Taconic Crest hiking trail and the multi-use Taconic Skyline Trail are located nearby. The mountain is known for its wild azalea fields. Its slopes are wooded with northern hardwood forest species. A park loop automobile road nearly encircles the summit, and a campground, maintained for summer use, is located just to the south of the summit. Berry Pond, 2,150 feet (660 m), presumed the highest natural pond in the state of Massachusetts, is located on the ridge between Berry Hill and Berry Mountain to the south.

The mountain is located within Hancock, Massachusetts. The ridgeline continues south from Berry Hill as Berry Mountain; it continues north as Honwee Mountain. Berry Hill is bordered by West Hill to the west across the Wyomanock Creek valley. The west side of the mountain drains into Berry Pond Creek, then Wyomanock Creek, thence into Kinderhook Creek, the Hudson River and Long Island Sound. The east side drains into Lulu Creek, thence into Onota Lake, the Housatonic River, and Long Island Sound.
