= Honwee Mountain =

Mountain in Massachusetts, U.S.

Highest point
- Elevation: 2,313 ft (705 m)
- Prominence: 371 ft (113 m)
- Coordinates: East summit 42.51080°N 73.30657°W; West summit 42.51713°N 73.31520°W

Geography
- Location: Berkshire County, Massachusetts
- Parent range: Taconic Mountains

Geology
- Rock age: Ordovician
- Mountain type(s): Thrust fault; metamorphic rock and sedimentary rock

Climbing
- Easiest route: Park loop road, Lulu Trail, and Honwee Circuit Trail

Honwee Mountain, east summit 2,313 feet (705 m) and west summit 2,280 feet (690 m), is a prominent mountain in the Taconic Mountains of western Massachusetts. The mountain is located in Pittsfield State Forest. The east (highest) summit is traversed by the Honwee Circuit multi-use trail. The west summit is crossed by the 35 mi (56 km) Taconic Crest hiking trail and the 12.1 mi (19.5 km) multi-use Taconic Skyline Trail. The mountain is wooded with northern hardwood forest species.

The east peak of Honwee mountain is located within the town of Lanesborough and the west peak in the town of Hancock. A shorter, middle summit 2,200 feet (670 m), is located between the east and west peaks, but it lacks significant prominence over the connecting ridge it occupies. A prominent spur peak called The Pinnacle, 1,710 feet (520 m), is located to the west of the main ridgeline.

The Taconic Range ridgeline continues north from Honwee Mountain as Poppy Mountain, south as Berry Hill, and west across the Wyomanock Creek valley as West Hill. The southwest side of the mountain drains into Berry Pond Creek, then Wyomanock Creek, thence into Kinderhook Creek, the Hudson River and Long Island Sound. The northwest side drains into Kinderhook Creek. The east side drains into Lulu Creek and Churchill Brook, thence into Onota Lake, the Housatonic River, and Long Island Sound.
