= Poppy Mountain =

Mountain in Massachusetts, United States

- Pease Ridge
- Location within Massachusetts

Highest point
- Elevation: 2,311 ft (704 m)
- Parent peak: N 42.52361 W 73.30975
- Coordinates: 42°31′25″N 73°18′35″W

Geography
- Location: Berkshire County, Massachusetts
- Parent range: Taconic Mountains

Geology
- Rock age: Ordovician
- Mountain type(s): Thrust fault; metamorphic rock and sedimentary rock

Climbing
- Easiest route: Taconic Crest Trail

Poppy Mountain, 2,311 feet (704 m), sometimes identified as Pease Ridge, its northwest descending crest, is a prominent peak in the Taconic Mountains of western Massachusetts. The mountain is located in Pittsfield State Forest and is traversed by the 35 mi (56 km) Taconic Crest hiking trail. The overgrown summit is wooded with northern hardwood forest species.

The summit and west side of Poppy Mountain is located within the town of Hancock and the eastern slopes within Lanesborough. It has several sub-peaks: Pease Ridge, a descending northwest ridgeline with a prominent knob 1,870 feet (570 m), two low spurs off the main summit 1,930 feet (590 m) and 2,250 feet (690 m), and an eastern summit 2,150 feet (660 m), occasionally confused with nearby Potter Mountain in older hiking guidebooks.

The Taconic Range ridgeline continues north from Poppy Mountain as Potter Mountain (also known as Jiminy Peak), south as Honwee Mountain, and west across the Wyomanock Creek valley as Rounds Mountain. The west side of the mountain drains into Kinderhook Creek, the Hudson River and Long Island Sound. The east side drains into Daniels Brook and Churchill Brook, thence into Onota Lake, the Housatonic River, and Long Island Sound.
