= Holy Mount =

Mountain in New York, United States

Highest point
- Elevation: 1,968 ft (600 m)
- Parent peak: N 42.45098 W 73.35357
- Coordinates: 42.45098°N 73.35357°W

Geography
- Location: Hancock, Massachusetts and New Lebanon, New York
- Parent range: Taconic Mountains

Geology
- Rock age: Ordovician
- Mountain type(s): Thrust fault; metamorphic rock and sedimentary rock

Climbing
- Easiest route: Shaker Trail

Holy Mount, 1,968 feet (600 m), is a prominent peak in the Taconic Mountains of western Massachusetts, formerly used as the location of religious ceremonies by a nearby Shaker community.

== Geography ==
The mountain is located in Pittsfield State Forest and is traversed by the 5 mi (8.0 km) loop Shaker Trail which begins at the historic Hancock Shaker Village. The mountain is wooded with northern hardwood tree species. In addition to the main summit, the mountain has two other peaks, a western spur called Mount Lebanon 1,750 feet (530 m) and an unnamed northern peak 1,920 feet (590 m).

Most of Holy Mount is located within Hancock, Massachusetts, but the lower western slopes are within the town of New Lebanon, New York. The Taconic ridgeline continues north from Holy Mount as Doll Mountain, south as an unnamed mountain, and to the east as Shaker Mountain. It is bordered by The Knob to the west across the Wyomanock Creek valley. The west side of the mountain drains into Wyomanock Creek, then into Kinderhook Creek, thence into the Hudson River and Long Island Sound. The east side drains into Shaker Brook, thence to the Housatonic River and Long Island Sound. Twin Ponds and Cranberry Pond, two highland water bodies, located on the southwest shoulder of the mountain and are visited by the Taconic Skyline Trail and Taconic Crest Trail.
