= Pine Mountain (Taconic Mountains) =

Mountain in Massachusetts, United States

Highest point
- Elevation: 2,221 ft (677 m)
- Prominence: 213 ft (65 m)
- Parent peak: N 42.49416 W 73.32022
- Coordinates: 42.49416°N 73.32022°W

Geography
- Location: Berkshire County, Massachusetts
- Parent range: Taconic Mountains

Geology
- Rock age: Ordovician
- Mountain type(s): Thrust fault; metamorphic rock and sedimentary rock

Climbing
- Easiest route: Pine Mountain Trail

Pine Mountain, 2,221 feet (677 m), is a prominent peak in the Taconic Mountains of western Massachusetts. The mountain is located in Pittsfield State Forest and is traversed by the Pine Mountain Trail, which connects to the 35 mi (56 km) Taconic Crest hiking trail and the 12.1 mi (19.5 km) multi-use Taconic Skyline Trail.

The summit and west side of Pine Mountain are located within Hancock, Massachusetts; the east side is within Pittsfield, Massachusetts. Pine Mountain shares the summit ridge with Tower Mountain to the west; Smith Mountain is located south along the ridgeline, and Berry Mountain to the north. Tilden Swamp, a highland bog, is located just below the summit to the northwest. The mountain drains into Hawthorne Brook, Parker Brook, and Onota Lake, thence to the Housatonic River and Long Island Sound.
