= Tower Mountain (Massachusetts) =

Mountain in Massachusetts, United States

Highest point
- Elevation: 2,193 ft (668 m)
- Coordinates: 42.49840°N 73.33166°W

Geography
- Location: Berkshire County, Massachusetts
- Parent range: Taconic Mountains

Geology
- Rock age: Ordovician
- Mountain type(s): Thrust fault; metamorphic rock and sedimentary rock

Climbing
- Easiest route: Taconic Crest Trail

Tower Mountain, 2,193 feet (668 m), is a prominent peak in the Taconic Mountains of western Massachusetts. The mountain is located in Pittsfield State Forest and is traversed by the 35 mi (56 km) Taconic Crest hiking trail and the 12.1 mi (19.5 km) multi-use Taconic Skyline Trail. The summit is partially open with views to the west; the slopes are wooded with northern hardwood tree species.

Tower Mountain is located within Hancock, Massachusetts; it shares the summit ridge with Pine Mountain to the east; Smith Mountain is located south along the ridgeline, and Berry Mountain to the north. It is bordered by West Hill to the west across the Wyomanock Creek valley. Tilden Swamp, a highland bog, is located just below the summit to the northeast. The west side of the mountain drains into Wyomanock Creek, then into Kinderhook Creek, thence into the Hudson River and Long Island Sound. The east side drains into Smith Brook, Parker Brook, and Onota Lake, thence to the Housatonic River and Long Island Sound.
