= Smith Mountain (Taconic Mountains) =

Mountain in Massachusetts, United States

Highest point
- Elevation: 2,170 ft (660 m)
- Prominence: 232 ft (71 m)
- Parent peak: N 42.48261 W 73.33537
- Coordinates: 42.48261°N 73.33537°W

Geography
- Location: Berkshire County, Massachusetts
- Parent range: Taconic Mountains

Geology
- Rock age: Ordovician
- Mountain type(s): Thrust fault; metamorphic rock and sedimentary rock

Climbing
- Easiest route: Taconic Skyline Trail

Smith Mountain, 2,170 feet (660 m), is a prominent peak in the Taconic Mountains of western Massachusetts, USA. The mountain is located in Pittsfield State Forest and is traversed by the 12.1 mi (19.5 km) multi-use Taconic Skyline Trail. The summit is known for its extensive stand of wild azalea and is wooded with northern hardwood tree species.

Most of Smith Mountain is located within Hancock with lower east slopes within Pittsfield. West Mountain, 1,950 feet (590 m), a spur of Smith Mountain, is located along the mountain's south ridgeline. The Taconic ridgeline continues north from Smith Mountain as Pine Mountain and Tower Mountain, and south as Doll Mountain. It is bordered by West Hill to the west across the Wyomanock Creek valley. The west side of the mountain drains into Wyomanock Creek, then into Kinderhook Creek, thence into the Hudson River and Long Island Sound. The east side drains into Smith Brook, thence to the Housatonic River and Long Island Sound.

== See also ==
- Disappearance of Katherine E. Hull
