= Misery Mountain (Taconic Mountains) =

Mountain in Massachusetts, United States

Highest point
- Elevation: 2,671 ft (814 m)ridge high point
- Parent peak: 42° 39' 20"N, 73° 17' 56"W (NAD83/WGS84)
- Coordinates: High point: 42°36′52″N 73°18′40″W Ridgeline: 42°35′11″N 73°19′57″W to 42°39′20″N 73°17′56″W

Geography
- Location: Berkshire County, Massachusetts and Rensselaer County, New York
- Parent range: Taconic Mountains

Geology
- Rock age: Ordovician
- Mountain type(s): Thrust fault; metamorphic rock

Climbing
- Easiest route: Taconic Crest Trail

Misery Mountain, 2,671 feet (814 m), with at least ten well-defined summits, is a prominent 6 mi (9.7 km) long ridgeline in the Taconic Mountains of western Massachusetts and adjacent New York. The west side of the mountain is located in New York; the east side and high point lie within Massachusetts. The summit ridge is part meadow and part wooded with red spruce, balsam fir, and northern hardwood tree species. It is notable for its views of the Hudson River Valley to the west. The 35 mi (56 km) Taconic Crest Trail traverses the crest of the ridgeline but does not cross the summit.

== Geography ==
The subordinate summits of Misery Mountain do not have names except the southernmost peak, 2,440 feet (740 m) referred to as Bill's Lunch in popular hiking guides. The Taconic Crest Trail crosses the highest parts of Misery Mountain, including an unnamed northern summit at 2,646 feet (807 m) and a false summit at 2,611 feet (796 m), situated about 3,800 feet (1,200 m) west of the ridge’s highest point. Portions of the upper slopes and summit are within protected conservation land.

Misery Mountain is located within the New York towns of Stephentown and Berlin and the Massachusetts towns of Hancock and Williamstown. The Taconic ridge continues south as Rounds Mountain and north as Berlin Mountain. Misery Mountain is flanked to the east by Brodie Mountain. The northwest side of Misery Mountain drains into the Little Hoosic River, thence into the Hoosic River, the Hudson River, and New York Harbor. The southwest side drains into West Brook, Kinderhook Creek, thence the Hudson River; the southeast side into Kinderhook Creek. The northeast side drains into the West Branch of the Green River, the Green River, thence the Hoosic River.
