= Disappearance of Katherine E. Hull =

1936 missing person case in the United States

Katherine E. Hull
- Born: Katherine E. Hull c. 1914; New York, U.S.
- Disappeared: April 2, 1936 (aged 22) (Note: An online photo (here) of the Hull family headstone in New Lebanon shows "1911 – 1936" listed for Katherine, which suggests she may have been 24 or 25 at the time of her disappearance.); Lebanon Springs, New York, U.S.
- Status: Remains tentatively identified—found in December 1943 in Hancock, Massachusetts, U.S.
- Resting place: New Lebanon, New York, U.S. (Note: The noted remains were cremated in October 1944 and subsequently buried in New Lebanon.)
- Height: 5 ft 6 in (1.68 m) (approximate)

Katherine E. Hull (c. 1914 – disappeared April 2, 1936) was a 22-year-old American woman from Syracuse, New York, who disappeared in 1936 while visiting her grandmother in Lebanon Springs, New York, a hamlet within the town of New Lebanon. Hull set out for a walk and did not return. Human remains found in December 1943, a few miles from where Hull had last been seen, were tentatively identified as hers.

== Early life ==
Katherine Hull was the daughter of Harry and Florence Hull. She grew up in Saranac Lake, New York, where her father was the village's civil engineer. Her parents apparently separated in 1926, and Katherine lived with her mother, older sister, and maternal grandmother in Syracuse, New York. Like her older sister, Marjorie, Katherine was trained as a stenographer.

== Disappearance ==
On April 2, 1936, Hull and her father had just arrived in the Lebanon Springs section of New Lebanon, New York, to visit her paternal grandmother. (Note: Initial reports said the relative was an aunt or great-aunt, while later reports are clear that it was her paternal grandmother, Wilhelmina "Minnie" McGonagle, also referred to in newspapers as Mrs. J. C. McGonagle. Harry Hull had been born in Lebanon Springs in 1885.) After lunch, Hull set out alone on a stroll. She planned to return by evening, but when she did not return by dark, her father contacted police. She was initially described as 5 feet 6 1/2 inches (1.689 m) tall and weighing 140 pounds (64 kg) with light brown hair, light complexion, and a recent operation scar on her neck. (Note: A subsequent description gave her height as 5 feet 6 inches (1.68 m) and weight as 142 pounds (64 kg).) She was last seen wearing a blue dress, grey sweater, low black shoes with galoshes, black stockings, a green coat with a grey fur collar, and a brown hat.

That Hull was missing was reported the next day by the Associated Press as published in area newspapers. (Note: Initial newspaper reports gave her first name as Marguerite and then as Catherine.) Initial searching was conducted by the New York State Police with assistance from local Boy Scouts. On April 11, the State Police requested help from "all police agencies" in locating Hull. It was noted that "her parents said she might have planned to enter a convent", and it was later reported that her father said she had expressed a desire, on many occasions, to join an order of Episcopalian nuns. Several tips or reported sightings failed to locate Hull or add meaningful insight into her disappearance:

- On April 16, Hull's mother received an anonymous phone call from a woman who said Hull was in Utica, New York. (Note: Utica is approximately 100 miles (160 km) northwest of New Lebanon.)
- A diner employee in North Tarrytown, New York, was certain he had served Hull on May 19. (Note: North Tarrytown (now known as Sleepy Hollow) is approximately 100 miles (160 km) north of New Lebanon.)
- On May 23, Hull's mother was shown, and discounted, a photograph that had been submitted by a man in Richmond Hill who felt a woman renting a room from his mother looked like Hull. (Note: It is unclear if this was a reference to Richmond Hill, Queens, which is approximately 125 miles (201 km) south of New Lebanon, or elsewhere.)

In early May, Civilian Conservation Corps (CCC) campers helped with search efforts; the local sheriff "believed Miss Hull wandered into dense woods ... and may have died of exposure." Newspapers also reported that a reward was being offered, while printed posters about Hull's disappearance suggested that she may have amnesia. Thereafter, Hull's disappearance faded from the news, although in August, it was reported that the reward was $1,000 ($23,201 in 2025).

The possibility that Hull may have tried to leave the area by hitchhiking was suggested in at least two newspaper reports. In April 1936, an article published days after she went missing stated "she was seen getting into an automobile with a man and woman" of the afternoon of her disappearance, "headed toward Troy, which is on the route to Syracuse." (Note: Troy is approximately 25 miles (40 km) northwest of New Lebanon.) In January 1944, an article recounting her disappearance noted that a salesman had "identified pictures of Miss Hull as being those of a girl to whom he gave a ride in the vicinity of Pittsfield" at an unspecified time around her disappearance. (Note: Pittsfield is approximately 8 miles (13 km) east of New Lebanon.)

== Discovery of remains ==
In early December 1943, human remains were discovered on the western slope of West Mountain in the Pittsfield State Forest in Hancock, Massachusetts. (Note: West Mountain is a spur peak of Smith Mountain.) A hunter discovered a skull in a tree on Thursday, December 9. Another hunter of the same party stated that he had found the skull earlier—sources indicate either on Monday, December 6, or on Wednesday, December 8—and had placed it in the tree. Initial news reports indicated that a thigh bone and a bone tentatively identified as a rib had also been located, along with "a fancy coat button". These items were discovered "little more than a mile up the mountain from Lebanon Springs." Additional searching found the lower jaw of the skull with many teeth, part of the spine, several ribs, a clavicle, and arm and leg bones. Also found was "a piece of a garment."

The human remains were brought to a pathologist in Boston, while the button and piece of cloth were examined by a chemist with the Massachusetts State Police. The pathologist determined that the bones were that of a young woman of height between 5 feet 3 inches (1.60 m) and 5 feet 6 inches (1.68 m). The garment cloth was found to be wool and light brown in color, although it could have originally been green or khaki.

While Hull's height had been reported at 5 feet 6 1/2 inches (1.689 m) at the time of her disappearance, officials noted that a missing person flyer distributed in her home county had given her height as 5 feet 6 inches (1.68 m). However, anthropologist Wilton M. Krogman at the University of Chicago felt the thigh bone, at 17 1/2 inches (44 cm) long, corresponded to a height of 5 feet 5 1/2 inches (1.664 m), thus casting doubt that the remains were Hull. Identification via dental records was hampered by the determination that Hull's dentist was deceased. A tentative confirmation that the remains were Hull was announced, based on the presence of a gold filling covered by silver, which "resembled" her dental records. (Note: Some newspapers ran concise variants of the story, without noting the tentative or unofficial nature of the identification.)

In April 1944, officials returned to the site where the remains were discovered, at the request of Hull's family, "in hopes of making the identification more positive." Hull's disappearance again faded from the news, as no additional findings were reported. Although the identification had been reported as tentative, officials seemingly concluded the remains were Hull's and closed her missing person case, although apparently without filing a death certificate. Authorities could not determine a cause of death; the remains were cremated in October 1944 and buried in New Lebanon.

A 1972 recap in The Berkshire Eagle concluded with "to this day it's not known definitively who died in the mountain forest long ago."

== Legacy ==
In 1996, Hull's older sister, Marjorie, willed $350,000 ($718,491 in 2025) to Clarkson University in Potsdam, New York, upon her death. This was used to establish a scholarship fund in honor of her parents and sister. The Harry and Florence P. Hull and Katherine E. Hull Endowed Scholarship Fund was created to award scholarships to qualified undergraduate students in the college's engineering program.

== Similar cases ==
Disappearance locations of Welden (Bennington in 1946), Hull (Lebanon Springs in 1936), and Smith (Lakeville in 1952)

Other females later disappeared under similar circumstances within the New England region during the same era and there has been speculation that all three might have been victims of an unidentified serial killer. In addition to Hull:

- Paula Jean Welden, an 18-year-old college sophomore at Bennington College in North Bennington, Vermont, vanished on December 1, 1946, while hitchhiking to the Long Trail a few miles from the campus and has never been found.
- Constance Christine "Connie" Smith, a 10-year-old girl, ran away from Camp Sloane in Lakeville, Connecticut, on July 16, 1952, and was last seen hitchhiking along U.S. Route 44. Her disappearance has never been solved.

Lebanon Springs, New York, is located 40 miles (64 km) south of Bennington, Vermont, and 46 miles (74 km) north of Lakeville, Connecticut. Since Connie Smith appeared to be older than she actually was, one author speculated that she might have been a victim of a serial killer with a preference for young women in their late teens, such as Welden, or early twenties, such as Hull.

== See also ==
- List of solved missing person cases (pre-1950)
