= Shaker Mountain =

Mountain in Massachusetts, United States

- Location within Massachusetts

Highest point
- Elevation: 1,835 ft (559 m)
- Coordinates: 42°26′45″N 73°20′13″W

Geography
- Location: Berkshire County, Massachusetts, U.S.
- Parent range: Taconic Mountains
- Topo map: USGS Pittsfield West

Geology
- Rock age: Ordovician
- Mountain type(s): Thrust fault; metamorphic rock and sedimentary rock

Climbing
- Easiest route: Shaker Trail

Shaker Mountain, 1,835 feet (559 m), is a prominent peak in the Taconic Mountains of western Massachusetts. The mountain is located in Pittsfield State Forest and is named after the nearby Hancock Shaker Village, a former Shaker religious colony and now a historic site. The summit is wooded and is traversed by the 5 mi (8.0 km) Shaker Trail, a loop trail that begins at the historic site. The mountain is wooded with northern hardwood tree species.

Shaker Mountain is located within Hancock, Massachusetts. The Taconic ridgeline continues north from Shaker Mountain as Doll Mountain and west as Holy Mount The mountain drains into Shaker Brook and Lily Brook, thence to the Housatonic River and Long Island Sound.
