= Taconic Trails =

Trails in the Taconic Mountains, USA

Taconic Trails or Taconic Trail may refer to any or all of three long distance recreational trails and associated networks of shorter trails within the Taconic Mountains of Massachusetts, New York, Connecticut, and Vermont.

The three main trails are:

- The South Taconic Trail, a 15.7 mi (25.3 km) ridgeline hiking trail located in the southwest corner of Massachusetts and adjacent parts of New York.
- The Taconic Crest Trail, a 35 mi (56 km) ridgeline hiking trail located north of Pittsfield, Massachusetts. Its southern third is located in Pittsfield State Forest of Massachusetts, its middle third traverses the border of Massachusetts and New York, and its northern third is located along the New York-Vermont border.
- The Taconic Skyline Trail a 12.1 mi (19.5 km) multi-use ridgeline trail located entirely within the Massachusetts Taconics, east of the Taconic Crest Trail. This trail is primarily used by all-terrain vehicle users and snowmobilers and is maintained as such.

Trail networks in the northern Taconic region (northwest Massachusetts, southwest Vermont, and adjacent New York) are sometimes referred to as the "North Taconic Trails."

In the late 1990s, the Taconic Crest Trail and Taconic Skyline Trail were re-designated, lengthening the former by 6 miles (9.7 km) and shortening the latter by 9 miles (14 km). This redesignation also resulted in the Taconic Crest Trail marked as non-motorized and the Taconic Skyline trail as motorized/ multi-use.

The Taconic Trails are supported by Massachusetts' Commonwealth Connections greenway initiative, as well as the efforts of various conservation and recreation non-profit organizations in the four-state Taconic region.
