= Williams Ephs =

Collegiate sports club in the United States

- University: Williams College
- Nickname: Ephs
- NCAA: Division III
- Conference: NECAC (primary); EISA (skiing)
- Athletic director: Lisa Melendy
- Location: Williamstown, Massachusetts
- Varsity teams: 16 men's, 16 women's
- Football stadium: Weston Athletic Complex
- Basketball arena: Chandler Gymnasium
- Baseball stadium: Bobby Coombs Field
- Softball stadium: Williams Softball Complex
- Soccer stadium: Cole Field
- Lacrosse stadium: Weston Athletic Complex
- Other venues: Lasell Gymnasium
- Colors: Purple and gold
- Mascot: Ephelia the Purple Cow
- Website: ephsports.williams.edu
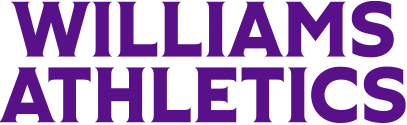

The Williams Ephs (/ˈiːfs/ EEFS) are the varsity intercollegiate athletic programs of Williams College in Williamstown, Massachusetts.

The school sponsors 32 varsity sports, most of which compete in the NCAA Division III as members of the New England Small College Athletic Conference (NESCAC). The school's men's and women's ski teams and men's and women's squash teams compete in Division I. The Ephs' nickname (which rhymes with "chiefs") is a shortened form of the name of Ephraim Williams, the college's founder. The Ephs' mascot is a purple cow, and their colors are purple and gold. The school's athletic director is Lisa Melendy.

Williams, along with fellow NESCAC members Amherst and Wesleyan, is part of the Little Three rivalry, one of the oldest continually contested rivalries in college athletics. It dates to 1899, when the three schools formed the Triangular League for athletic competitions. Today, the majority of the three schools' sports contest the Little Three championship, in which the school with the best record in games among the three is awarded the Little Three title for its sport. Williams's rivalry with Amherst is particularly heated, dating back to 1821, when then-Williams president Zephaniah Swift Moore abandoned Williams to found Amherst College. The football game played between the two is known as "The Biggest Little Game in America" and hosted College GameDay in 2007.

Williams has consistently won the NACDA Directors' Cup, an annual award for the most successful athletic program in each NCAA division. Since 1996, the year of the award's inception, Williams has won the Division III Directors' Cup 22 out of 24 years (the exceptions being 1998 and 2012). For sixteen of the past seventeen years (2004–2011, 2013–2020), the college has held a dual #1 ranking in both athletics and academics by winning the Directors' Cup and placing first in the U.S. News & World Report liberal arts college rankings. Alumni of the athletic program include two Nobel Prize winners, 33 Olympians, 19 Rhodes Scholars, four Marshall Scholars, and 44 Fulbright Scholars.

== History ==
Varsity intercollegiate sports began at the school on July 1, 1859, when Williams was defeated by Amherst 73–32 in the first-ever college baseball game. On May 3, 2009, Williams's baseball team played Amherst at Wahconah Park in Pittsfield, Massachusetts to commemorate the 150th anniversary of the 1859 game. Williams won the game, 8–5, which was televised live on ESPN 360 and on tape delay on ESPNU.

Williams was one of the 39 institutions that founded the National Collegiate Athletic Association (NCAA) in 1905. Three other NESCAC schools, Amherst, Tufts, and Wesleyan, were also part of the founding group.

Women's varsity athletics began at Williams after the college became coeducational in the 1970–1971 school year. As a result, most of the college's 16 women's sports programs began varsity play during the 1970s, with three exceptions (softball in 1987, ice hockey in 1993, and golf in 2004–2005).

== Varsity sports ==
Men's sports	Women's sports
Baseball	Basketball
Basketball	Cross country
Cross country	Field hockey
Football	Golf
Golf	Ice hockey
Ice hockey	Lacrosse
Lacrosse	Rowing
Rowing	Skiing
Skiing	Soccer
Soccer	Softball
Squash	Squash
Swimming	Swimming
Tennis	Tennis
Track and field	Track and field
Wrestling	Volleyball

=== Men's ===
==== Baseball ====
The baseball team is coached by Bill Barrale, who has held the position since the start of the 2007 season. The team plays at Bobby Coombs Field on campus. The program has had four players selected to the Division III All-America Team since 1971. In rivalry play against Amherst (beginning in 1859), the team holds a 139–217–2 record, as of the end of the 2018 season. In games against Wesleyan (beginning in 1892), the team holds a 158–134–1 record, as of the end of the 2018 season.

On July 1, 1859, the team played in the first-ever college baseball game, losing to Amherst 73–32 in a game that lasted 25 innings. The two teams played a game on May 3, 2009, to celebrate the first game's 150th anniversary. Williams won the game 8–5.

Six Williams alumni who played baseball for the program went on to play in the major leagues: Artie Clarke, Edward M. Lewis, Jack Mills, Bill Otis, Iron Davis, and Mark Filley. Three others who played for the program but did not graduate from Williams also played in the major leagues: Henry Clarke, Alex Burr, and Charlie Perkins.

The team has won the following honors:

- Little Three Titles (since 1990): 1997, 1998, 2001, 2004, 2006, 2007, 2010
- NESCAC Championships: 2001, 2007
- NCAA Tournament Appearances: 1999, 2001, 2007

==== Basketball ====
The men's basketball team is coached by Kevin App, who has held the position since the start of the 2014–15 season. The team plays at Chandler Gymnasium on campus. The program holds the record for the longest home win streak in men's Division III history, having won 64 consecutive games at Chandler Gymnasium from January 16, 2001, to January 4, 2005. The team has had 14 players named to the Division III All-America Team since 1971, including three two-time and two three-time selections. The individual honorees include Harry Sheehy III (1974, 1975), Garcia Major (1990), Rob Bice (1994), Noah Clarke (1995), Geoff Chapin (1996), Michael Nogelo (1996, 1997, 1998), Matt Hunt (1999), Ben Coffin (2004), Michael Crotty (2003, 2004), Blake Schultz (2010), Troy Whittington (2011), James Wang (2010, 2011), Michael Mayer (2013, 2014), Duncan Robinson (2014), and James Heskett (2018). The team has also had two players named National Players of the Year, Michael Nogelo in 1998 and Blake Schultz in 2010.

Basketball was first recognized as a varsity sport in the 1900–01 season. Williams was retroactively named as the top team for the 1906–07 and 1909–10 seasons by the Premo-Porretta Power Poll. The 1954–55 team made the NCAA basketball tournament in 1955, losing in the First Round. In rivalry play against Amherst (beginning in 1901), the team holds a 120–102 record, as of the end of the 2017–18 season. In games against Wesleyan (beginning in 1902), the team holds a 141–86 record, as of the end of the 2017–18 season. In 2003, the team won the Division III National Championship.

The team reached the quarterfinals of the 1961 College Division Tournament, where it lost to Wittenberg 64–51. As a result of Wittenberg students' unruly celebrations after the game, Williams administrators decided to ban teams from participating in national tournaments. The ban was lifted for the 1993–94 academic year.

For the 2012–13 season, the team ranked 26th in Division III in average game attendance, averaging 825 spectators per home game.

The team has won the following honors:

- Little Three Titles (since 1990): 1990, 1992, 1993, 1995, 1996, 2009, 2010, 2020, 2023 (outright); 1994, 1997, 1998, 2000, 2002–2004, 2011, 2022, 2024 (ties)
- NESCAC Championships: 2003, 2004, 2007, 2010, 2018
- NCAA Tournament Appearances: 1994–1998, 2000, 2002–2004, 2007, 2010, 2011, 2013, 2014, 2017–2019, 2022–2024
- Final Fours: 1997, 1998, 2003, 2004, 2010, 2011, 2014, 2017
- National Runners-up: 2004, 2010, 2014
- National Championships: 2003

==== Crew ====
The men's crew team is coached by Marc Mandel, who has held the position since the start of the 2017–18 season. The team rows on Lake Onota in Pittsfield, Massachusetts, approximately 30 minutes from campus. The program began varsity competition in 1869 but withdrew in 1879. It was brought back for a short time in the 1930s until the start of World War II. In 1968, Williams alumnus John A. Shaw revived the team, which has competed continually since then. The program has had one alumnus go on to compete in the Olympics.

The team has won the following honors:

- Little Three Titles (since 1990): 1992, 1994–1998, 2000–2006, 2008–2016, 2018, 2021, 2022, 2023, 2025
- NESCAC Championships: 2004, 2009–2014, 2016, 2021, 2022, 2023
- ECAC National Invitational Championships: 2010, 2012–2014
- Head of the Charles Collegiate Eights Championships: 1997, 2008, 2009, 2011
- New England Championships: 1994–1996, 2009–2012, 2014, 2022
- IRA Division 3 National Championship: 2022, 2023

==== Cross country ====
The men's cross country team is coached by Peter Farwell, who has held the position since the start of the 1979 season. The team's home course is located near Mount Greylock High School in Williamstown, approximately five minutes from campus. The team has had numerous runners named to the Division III All-America Team and two individual national champions (Jeremie Perry in 1994 and Neal Holtschulte in 2005) since beginning varsity competition in 1912.

The team has won the following honors:

- Little Three Titles (since 1988): 1988–2016, 2019–2021
- NESCAC Championships: 1992, 1994–2000, 2006–2009, 2011, 2013–2016, 2019
- NCAA Tournament Appearances: 1975, 1977, 1993–2004, 2006–2018
- NCAA Tournament 5th Place: 1996, 2000, 2013
- NCAA Tournament 4th Place: 1993
- NCAA Tournament 3rd Place: 1998, 2008, 2019
- National Runners-up: 2009, 2015
- National Champions: 1994, 1995

==== Football ====
The football team is coached by Mark Raymond, who has held the position since the start of the 2016 season. The team plays at Weston Field on campus. The team has had 16 players named to the Division III All-America Team since 1974. The program began varsity play in 1881. As a NESCAC football team, the program is not permitted to play non-conference games or to participate in the NCAA Tournament.

The team's annual rivalry game against Amherst is known as the Biggest Little Game In America. It is traditionally the final game of each season. The 2007 game between Williams and Amherst, won by Williams 20–0, hosted College GameDay at Weston Field (Williamstown). As of the end of the 2013 season, Williams leads the all-time series 71–52–5.

The team has won the following honors:

- Little Three Titles (since 1990): 1990–1994, 1996, 1998, 2001, 2003, 2005–2008, 2010, 2021 (outright); 1995, 1997, 1999, 2017 (ties)
- NESCAC Championships (since 2000): 2001, 2006, 2010, 2021 (outright); 2002 (tie)
- Perfect seasons: 1989, 1990, 1994, 1998, 2001, 2006, 2010, 2021

==== Golf ====
The men's golf team is currently coached by Josh Hillman, who has held the position since the start of the start of the 2013 spring season. The team plays at the Taconic Golf Club in Williamstown, located next to campus. The program has had eight players, including one two-time selection, named to the Division III All-America Team since varsity competition began in 1903.

The team has won the following honors:

- Little Three Titles (since 1990): 1992, 1993, 1995, 1998–2011, 2013–2016
- NESCAC Championships: 1984, 1986, 1994, 1996, 2000–2002, 2004, 2005, 2008, 2013–2016
- NCAA Tournament appearances: 1996–2003, 2005, 2008, 2013, 2017
- NCAA Tournament individual champion: Sam Goldenring (2019)

==== Ice hockey ====
The men's ice hockey team is coached by Bill Kangas, who has held the position since the start of the 1989–1990 season. The team plays at Lansing Chapman Rink on campus. Prior to the construction of Lansing Chapman in the 1950s, the team played outdoors on a pond near the current location of Cole Field, the Williams soccer facility. The program has had seven players, including one two-time and one three-time selection, named to the Division III All-America Team since varsity play began in 1902. In rivalry play against Amherst (beginning in 1909), the team holds an 89–36–3 record, as of the end of the 2013–2014 season. In games against Wesleyan (beginning in 1958), the team holds a 40–6–7 record, as of the end of the 2013–2014 season.

The program has won the following honors:

- Little Three Titles (since 1989): 1990–1994, 1996–1999, 2001–2005, 2013 (outright); 1989, 2006 (ties)

==== Indoor track & field ====
The men's indoor track & field team is coached by David Thompson, who has held the position since the start of the 2013–2014 season. The team competes at the Towne Field House on campus. It has had numerous athletes named to the Division III All-America Team since varsity play began. The indoor program does not compete in either the Little Three Meet (held in the spring) or the NESCAC Championships (sponsored only in the outdoor season). Thus, the team's postseason play consists only of regionals and nationals. It has had three individual national champions: Bobby Walker in the 35 lb. Weight Throw in 1995, Ethan Brooks in the 35 lb. Weight Throw in 1996, and Creaghan Trainor in the 800 Meter in 1996.

The team has won the following honors:

- NCAA Championships 3rd Place: 1996

==== Lacrosse ====
The men's lacrosse team is coached by George McCormack, who has held the position since the start of the 2004 season. The team plays at Renzie Lamb Field on campus. The program has had numerous players named to the Division III All-America Team since varsity play began in 1928. In rivalry play against Amherst (beginning in 1955), the team holds a 36–26 record, as of the end of the 2014 season. In games against Wesleyan (beginning in 1960), the team holds a 38–19 record, as of the end of the 2014 season.

The program has won the following honors:

- Little Three Titles (since 1990): 1990–1996, 1999, 2009, 2023 (outright); 2000, 2002, 2006, 2008, 2010 (ties)

==== Outdoor track & field ====
The men's outdoor track & field team is coached by David Thompson, who has held the position since the start of the 2014 season. The team competes at the Tony Plansky Track on campus. It has had numerous athletes named to the Division III All-America Team since varsity play began in 1884. It has had nine individual national champions.

The team has won the following honors:

- Little Three Titles (since 1989): 1989–2014
- NESCAC Championships: 1995–1999, 2001–2011
- National Runners-up: 1995, 1996

==== Skiing ====
The men's Nordic ski team is coached by Jason Lemieux, who has held the position since the 2014–2015 season. The men's alpine ski team is coached by Kelsey Levine, who has held the position since the 2014–2015 season. The Nordic ski team competes at Prospect Mountain in Woodford, Vermont, approximately 30 minutes from campus. The alpine ski team competes at Jiminy Peak in Hancock, Massachusetts, approximately 20 minutes from campus. The teams have had numerous skiers named to the Division I All-America Team since varsity competition began in 1974.

The team has won the following honors:

- NCAA Tournament Appearances: 1990–2016

==== Soccer ====
The men's soccer team is coached by Mike Russo, who has held the position since the start of the 1979 season and been named National Coach of the Year four times. The team plays at Cole Field on campus. The team has had numerous players named to the Division III All-America Team, including four named National Players of the Year, since varsity play began in 1922. In rivalry play against Amherst (beginning in 1922), the team holds a 40–45–14 record, as of the end of the 2013 season. In games against Wesleyan (beginning in 1924), the team holds a 53–32–11 record, as of the end of the 2013 season. The team won the 1995 National Championship.

The team has had 13 players go on to play professional and international soccer, including Mike Masters, Stephen Danbusky, Dan Calichman, Josh Bolton, Charlie Romero, and Khari Stephenson.

The team has won the following honors:

- Little Three Titles (since 1990): 1993, 1994, 1996, 1998–2001, 2003–2005, 2009 (outright); 1990, 1995, 1997, 2002, 2010, 2012 (ties)
- NESCAC Championships: 2001–2004, 2006, 2009
- NCAA Tournament Appearances: 1993–1996, 1998–2007, 2009, 2010, 2012–13
- NCAA Third Place: 1998, 2009, 2012, 2013
- National Runners-up: 1993
- National Championships: 1995

==== Squash ====
The men's squash team is coached by Hesham Aly, who has held the position since the start of the 2024–2025 season. The team plays at the Simon Squash Center on campus. The team has had numerous players named to the Division I All-America Team since varsity play began in 1939. In rivalry play against Amherst (beginning in 1940), the team holds a 54–21 record, as of the end of the 2013–2014 season. In matches against Wesleyan (beginning in 1939), the team holds a 69–0 record, as of the end of the 2013–2014 season.

The team has won the following honors:

- Little Three Titles (since 1990): 1990, 1991, 1993, 1994, 2000–2014
- Appearances in Potter Division (Top 8 Teams) at National Championships: 1997, 1998, 1999, 2001, 2002, 2006, 2007, 2008

==== Swimming & diving ====
The men's swimming & diving team is coached by Steve Kuster, who has held the position since the start of the 1999–2000 season. The team competes at Samuelson-Muir Pool on campus. The team has had numerous swimmers named to the Division III All-America Team since varsity competition began in 1907–1908. In rivalry meets against Amherst (beginning in 1909), the team holds a 68–34–2 record, as of the end of the 2013–2014 season. In meets against Wesleyan (beginning in 1916), the team holds a 73–15–1 record, as of the end of the 2013–2014 season. The team has won 16 individual and one relay national championship.

The team has won the following honors:

- Little Three Titles (since 1990): 1990–1993, 1995–2002, 2005, 2006, 2010, 2013
- NESCAC Championships: 2001, 2003–2014
- NCAA Tournament Appearances: 1982–2014
- National Runners-up: 1982

==== Tennis ====
The men's tennis team is coached by Dan Greenberg, who has held the position since the start of the 2010 season. The team plays at the Torrence M. Hunt Tennis Center on campus. It also has four indoor courts in Lansing Chapman Rink. The team has had numerous players named to the Division III All-America Team since varsity play began in 1884, including one National Player of the Year (Josh Lefkowitz in 2002). In rivalry play against Amherst (beginning in 1899), the team holds a 71–36–3 record, as of the end of the 2014 season. In matches against Wesleyan (beginning in 1910), it holds an 87–4–3 record, as of the end of the 2014 season. The team has won four national championships, in 1999, 2001, 2002, and 2013.

The team has won the following honors:

- Little Three Titles (since 1990): 1995–2008
- NESCAC Championships: 1983, 1985, 1987, 1993–2003, 2013
- NCAA Tournament Appearances: 1995–2014
- NCAA Third Place: 2012
- National Runners-up: 1998, 2003, 2004
- National Championships: 1999, 2001, 2002, 2013

==== Wrestling ====
The men's wrestling team is coached by head coach Scott Honecker, who was named to the position prior to the 2013–2014 season, having served as interim head coach for the 2012–2013 season. Historically, the team competed for the Little Three Championship, but the Little Three Meet was discontinued in 1991. The team has had eight wrestlers named to the Division III All-America Team, including one two-time and three three-time selections, since varsity play began in 1925.

The team has won the following honors:

- Little Three Championships (since 1990): 1990
- NECCWA Co-Championships: 1995
- NEWA Championships: 2009, 2010
- NCAA Tournament Appearances: 2000, 2003–2009, 2013–2014

=== Women's ===
==== Basketball ====
The women's basketball team is coached by Pat Manning, who has held the position since the start of the 1989–1990 season and is the winningest coach in program history. The team plays at Chandler Gymnasium on campus. It has had three players named to the Division III All-America Team since 1974. The team began varsity play in the 1973–1974 school year. In rivalry play against Amherst (beginning in 1977), the team holds a 44–35 record, as of the end of the 2013–2014 season. In games against Wesleyan (beginning in 1974), the team holds a 54–26 record, as of the end of the 2013–2014 season.

The team has won the following honors:

- Little Three Titles (since 1990): 1991, 1996, 1997, 1999, 2002, 2007 (outright); 1994, 1995, 1998, 2003–2006, 2013 (ties)
- NCAA Tournament Appearances: 1997, 1999, 2006, 2007, 2010, 2011, 2013, 2014
- NCAA Tournament Third Place: 2013

==== Crew ====
The women's crew team is coached by Kate Maloney, who has held the position since the start of the 2012 season. The team rows on Lake Onota in Pittsfield, Massachusetts, approximately 30 minutes from campus. The team has had numerous players named to the Division III All-America Team since it began varsity competition in the 1977–1978 school year. The program has had three alumni go on to compete in the Olympics. As of the end of the 2013 season, the program has won eight consecutive national championships, a women's Division III record.

The team has won the following honors:

- Little Three Titles (since 1990): 1990, 1991, 1993, 1994, 1995, 1997, 1998, 2000–2014
- NESCAC Championships: 2002, 2006–2013
- ECAC National Invitational Championships: 2002, 2006–2013
- Head of the Charles Collegiate Eights Championships: 2008, 2010, 2011
- New England Championships: 2000, 2001, 2006–2013
- NCAA Tournament Appearances: 1998–2014
- National Championships: 2002, 2006–2013

==== Cross country ====
The women's cross country team is coached by Peter Farwell, who has held the position since the start of the 2000 season. The team's home course is located near Mount Greylock High School in Williamstown, approximately five minutes from campus. The team has had numerous runners named to the Division III All-America Team and two individual national champions (Jessica Caley in 1995 and Chiara del Piccolo in 2011) since beginning varsity competition in 1976.

The team has won the following honors:

- Little Three Titles (since 1990): 1990–1998, 2000–2002, 2004–2006, 2008–2013
- NESCAC Championships: 1988–1991, 1996, 1997, 2002, 2005, 2011, 2012 (outright); 2004, 2008 (ties)
- NCAA Tournament Appearances: 1990, 1993–2013
- NCAA Tournament 5th Place: 1993, 1996, 2010
- NCAA Tournament 4th Place: 1994, 2003, 2012
- NCAA Tournament 3rd Place: 1990, 1998, 2008, 2011
- National Runners-up: 2000, 2001, 2005, 2013
- National Champions: 2002, 2004, 2015

==== Field hockey ====
The women's field hockey team is coached by Alix Barrale, who has held the position since the start of the 2000 season. The team plays at Renzie Lamb Field on campus. The program has had numerous players named to the Division III All-America Team since 1989. It began varsity play in the 1972 season. In rivalry play against Amherst (beginning in 1977), the team holds a 27–14–1 record, as of the end of the 2013 season. In games against Wesleyan (beginning in 1974), the team holds of 34–8 record, as of the end of the 2013 season.

The team has won the following honors:

- Little Three Titles (since 1990): 1991, 1992, 1994–1996, 2001, 2004, 2006, 2009 (outright); 1990, 1993, 1997, 1999, 2002 (ties)
- NESCAC Championships: 2001, 2002, 2004
- NCAA Tournament Appearances: 1994–1997, 2000–2006

==== Golf ====
The women's golf team has been coached by Tomas Adalsteinsson since 2016. Adalsteinsson replaced coach Bill Kangas, who was serving as interim head coach for the 2014–2015 season after Eika DeSanty left to become the head coach at Princeton. The team plays at the Taconic Golf Club in Williamstown, located next to campus. The program began varsity play in the 2004–2005 season. In 2014, the Ephs' Georgiana Salant won the individual national championship. In 2015, Ephs' Women's Golf won their first Team National Championship, led by sophomore, Sophie Kitchen, who finished third individually.

The team has won the following honors:

- NESCAC Championships: 2007, 2008, 2011–2019
- NCAA Tournament appearances: 2007, 2008, 2010–2019
- National Champions: 2015
- NCAA Tournament individual champion: Cordelia Chan (2019)

==== Ice hockey ====
The women's ice hockey team is coached by Meghan Gillis, who has held the position since the start of the 2011–2012 season. The team plays at Lansing Chapman Rink on campus. The program has had three players named to the Division III All-America Team since the beginning of varsity play in the 1993–1994 season. One of the program's All-Americans, Molly Wasserman, was a four-time selection (2001, 2002, 2003, 2004), who was also named the Division III National Player of the Year in 2004. In rivalry play against Amherst (beginning in 1994), the team holds a 24–15–2 record, as of the end of the 2013–2014 season. In games against Wesleyan (beginning in 1994), the team holds a 29–11–4 record, as of the end of the 2013–2014 season.

The team has won the following honors:

- Little Three Titles (since 1995): 1995, 1997, 2000–2006, 2017 (outright); 1994, 1996 (ties)
- NESCAC Championships: 2014
- NCAA Tournament Appearances: 2003, 2014

==== Indoor track & field ====
The women's indoor track & field team is coached by Nate Hoey, who has held the position since the start of the 2013–2014 season. The team competes at the Towne Field House on campus. It has had numerous athletes named to the Division III All-America Team since varsity play began. The indoor program does not compete in either the Little Three Meet (held in the spring) or the NESCAC Championships (sponsored only in the outdoor season). Thus, the team's postseason play consists only of regionals and nationals. It has had one relay and seven individual national champions and also won the team National Championship in 2007.

The team has won the following honors:

- National Runners-up: 2006
- National Championships: 2007, 2019

==== Lacrosse ====
The women's lacrosse team is coached by Alice Lee. The team plays at Renzie Lamb Field on campus. The program has had numerous players named to the Division III All-America Team since varsity play began in 1974. It has also had one National Defensive Player of the Year (Alyse Clayman in 1996) and one National Offensive Player of the Year (Alana Teutonico in 1997). In rivalry play against Amherst (beginning in 1978), the team holds a 22–19 record, as of the end of the 2014 season. In games against Wesleyan (beginning in 1978), the team holds a 31–6 record, as of the end of the 2014 season.

The team has won the following honors:

- Little Three Titles (since 1990): 1990–1997, 2000, 2010 (outright); 1999, 2009 (ties)
- NCAA Tournament Appearances: 1998, 2000, 2003, 2009, 2010, 2014
- National Runners-up: 1998, 2000

==== Outdoor track & field ====
The women's outdoor track & field team is coached by Nate Hoey, who has held the position since the start of the 2014 season. The team competes at the Tony Plansky Track on campus. It has had numerous athletes named to the Division III All-America Team since varsity play began in 1977. It has had thirteen individual national champions.

The team has won the following honors:

- Little Three Titles (since 1986): 1986–2013
- NESCAC Championships: 1990, 1991, 1994–1999, 2001–2012

==== Skiing ====
The women's Nordic ski team is coached by Jason Lemieux, who has held the position since the 2014–2015 season. The women's alpine ski team is coached by Kelsey Levine, who has held the position since the 2014–2015 season. The Nordic ski team competes at Prospect Mountain in Woodford, Vermont, approximately 30 minutes from campus. The alpine ski team competes at Jiminy Peak in Hancock, Massachusetts, approximately 20 minutes from campus. The teams have had numerous skiers named to the Division I All-America Team since varsity competition began in 1974.

The team has won the following honors:

- NCAA Tournament Appearances: 1990–2014

==== Soccer ====
The women's soccer team is coached by Michelyne Pinard, who has held the position since the start of the 2002 season. The team plays at Cole Field on campus. The team has had numerous players named to the Division III All-America Team since varsity play began in 1978. In rivalry play against Amherst (beginning in 1979), the team holds a 16-16-9 record, as of the end of the 2013 season. In games against Wesleyan (beginning in 1978), the team holds a 33–4–2 record, as of the end of the 2013 season.

The team has won the following honors:

- Little Three Titles (since 1990): 1991, 1993, 1998, 2001, 2007, 2009, 2012, 2013 (outright); 1990, 1995, 1996, 1999, 2002, 2008 (ties)
- NESCAC Championships: 2004, 2007–2010, 2012
- NCAA Tournament Appearances: 1993–1996, 1998, 1999, 2001, 2004, 2007–2015
- National Champions: 2014
- National Runners-up: 2015
- Final Four Appearances: 1999, 2008

==== Softball ====
The softball team is coached by Kris Herman, who has held the position since the 2004 season. The team plays at the Williams Softball Complex on campus. The program has had four players named to the Division III All-America Team since varsity play began in 1987. In rivalry play against Amherst (beginning in 1987), the team holds a 36–14 record, as of the end of the 2014 season. In games against Wesleyan (beginning in 1987), the team holds a 48–14 record, as of the end of the 2014 season.

The team has won the following honors:

- Little Three Titles (since 1990): 1995–1997, 1999–2007, 2009, 2010, 2012, 2014
- NESCAC Championships: 2004–2006
- NCAA Tournament Appearances: 2004–2006, 2014
- Division III World Series Appearances: 2005, 2006

==== Squash ====
The women's squash team is coached by Zafi Levy, who has held the position since the start of the 2002–2003 season. The team plays at the Simon Squash Center on campus. The program has had numerous players named to the Division III All-America Team since varsity play began in the 1974–1975 season. In rivalry play against Amherst (beginning in 1979), the team holds a 31–8 record, as of the end of the 2013–2014 season. In matches against Wesleyan (beginning in 1975), the team holds a 43–1 record, as of the end of the 2013–2014 season.

The team has won the following honors:

- Little Three Titles (since 1990): 1991, 1993–1995, 2000–2014
- Howe Cup Appearances: 1998, 2002–2007, 2009

==== Swimming & diving ====
The women's swimming & diving team is coached by Steve Kuster, who has held the position since the start of the 1999–2000 season. The team competes at Samuelson-Muir Pool on campus. The team has had numerous swimmers named to the Division III All-America Team since varsity competition began in 1977–1978. In rivalry meets against Amherst (beginning in 1977), the team holds a 34–4 record, as of the end of the 2013–2014 season. In meets against Wesleyan (beginning in 1978), the team holds a 35–0 record, as of the end of the 2013–2014 season. It has won every NESCAC Championship since the conference began holding a women's swimming & diving championship in 2001. The team has won 69 individual and 21 relay national championships. Additionally, despite the NESCAC's ban on member schools' competition in national team championships, the program qualified enough swimmers individually to win the 1982 and 1983 National Championships. Kuwaiti Olympian Faye Sultan, who began competing for the team in the 2012–2013 season, is the team's first swimmer to compete in Olympic competition.

The team has won the following honors:

- Little Three Titles (since 1990): 1990–2003, 2005, 2006, 2009–2013
- NESCAC Championships: 2001–2012
- NCAA Tournament Appearances: 1982–2013
- National Runners-up: 1995, 1997, 2003, 2012
- National Championships: 1982, 1983

==== Tennis ====
The women's tennis team is coached by Alison Swain, who has held the position since the start of the 2008 season. The team plays at the Torrence M. Hunt Tennis Center on campus. It also has four indoor courts in Lansing Chapman Rink. It has had numerous players named to the Division III All-America Team since varsity play began in 1973. In rivalry play against Amherst (beginning in 1977), the team holds a 29–39 record, as of the end of the 2014 season. In matches against Wesleyan (beginning in 1972), the team holds a 40–0 record, as of the end of the 2014 season. The team has won eight National Championships (a women's Division III record), in 2001, 2002, 2008, 2009, 2010, 2011, 2012, and 2013. It also has won two National Doubles Championships (the teams of Julie Greenwood and Becky Mallory in 1994 and Julie Greenwood and Porter Harris in 1996).

The team has won the following honors:

- Little Three Titles (since 1990): 1992–1995, 2000, 2002, 2006, 2008, 2010, 2012
- NESCAC Championships: 2001, 2002, 2003, 2011, 2013 (outright); 2004 (tie)
- NCAA Tournament Appearances: 1994–2014
- NCAA Tournament 3rd Place: 2003, 2004, 2014
- National Runners-up: 1994, 1999
- National Championships: 2001, 2002, 2008–2013

==== Volleyball ====
The women's volleyball team is coached by Christi Kelsey, who has held the position since the start of the 2009 season. The team plays at Chandler Gymnasium on campus. It has had numerous players named to the Division III All-America Team since varsity play began in 1976. In rivalry play against Amherst (beginning in 1979), the team holds a 45–27 record, as of the end of the 2013 season. Against Wesleyan (beginning in 1983), the team holds a 35–7 record.

The team has won the following honors:

- Little Three Titles (since 1990): 1990, 1995–1998, 2001–2004, 2006, 2013 (outright); 2009 (ties)
- NESCAC Championships: 1994, 1995, 2001–2004, 2007–2009, 2013
- NCAA Tournament Appearances: 1994, 1995, 1998, 2001–2004, 2007–2009, 2013

== Club teams ==
The Williams Rugby Football Club was established in 1959, starting with a handful of incoming freshmen with experience playing rugby while studying in England, the club was formed and supported by Peter Pearson, the first Williams Rugby coach. The following fall, the WRFC entered the Eastern Rugby Union (ERU) and won the ERU Championship in 1960 with a 5-0-1 record. Following a 1962 tour in England, support and recognition from the college increased dramatically.

== Facilities ==
Most Williams's athletic programs have on-campus home venues, with the exceptions of men's and women's cross country, men's and women's golf, men's and women's crew, and men's and women's skiing.

Facility	Sport
Bobby Coombs Field	Baseball
John Chandler Gymnasium (Note: Part of Williams' John Chandler Athletic Center.)	Basketball; Volleyball
Lake Onota (Note: Facility not owned by Williams College.)	Rowing
Mount Greylock High School Course	Cross Country
Weston Field Athletic Complex	Football; Field Hockey; Lacrosse; Track and field (outdoor)
Taconic Golf Club	Golf
Lansing Chapman Rink	Ice Hockey
Towne Field House	Track and field (indoor)
Lee Track of Weston At. Complex	Track and field (outdoor)
Jiminy Peak	Skiing (alpine)
Prospect Mountain	Skiing (Nordic)
Cole Field	Soccer
Williams Softball Complex	Softball
Simon Squash Center	Squash
Samuelson-Muir Pool	Swimming
Torrence M. Hunt Tennis Center	Tennis
Lasell Gymnasium	Wrestling

=== Weston Field ===
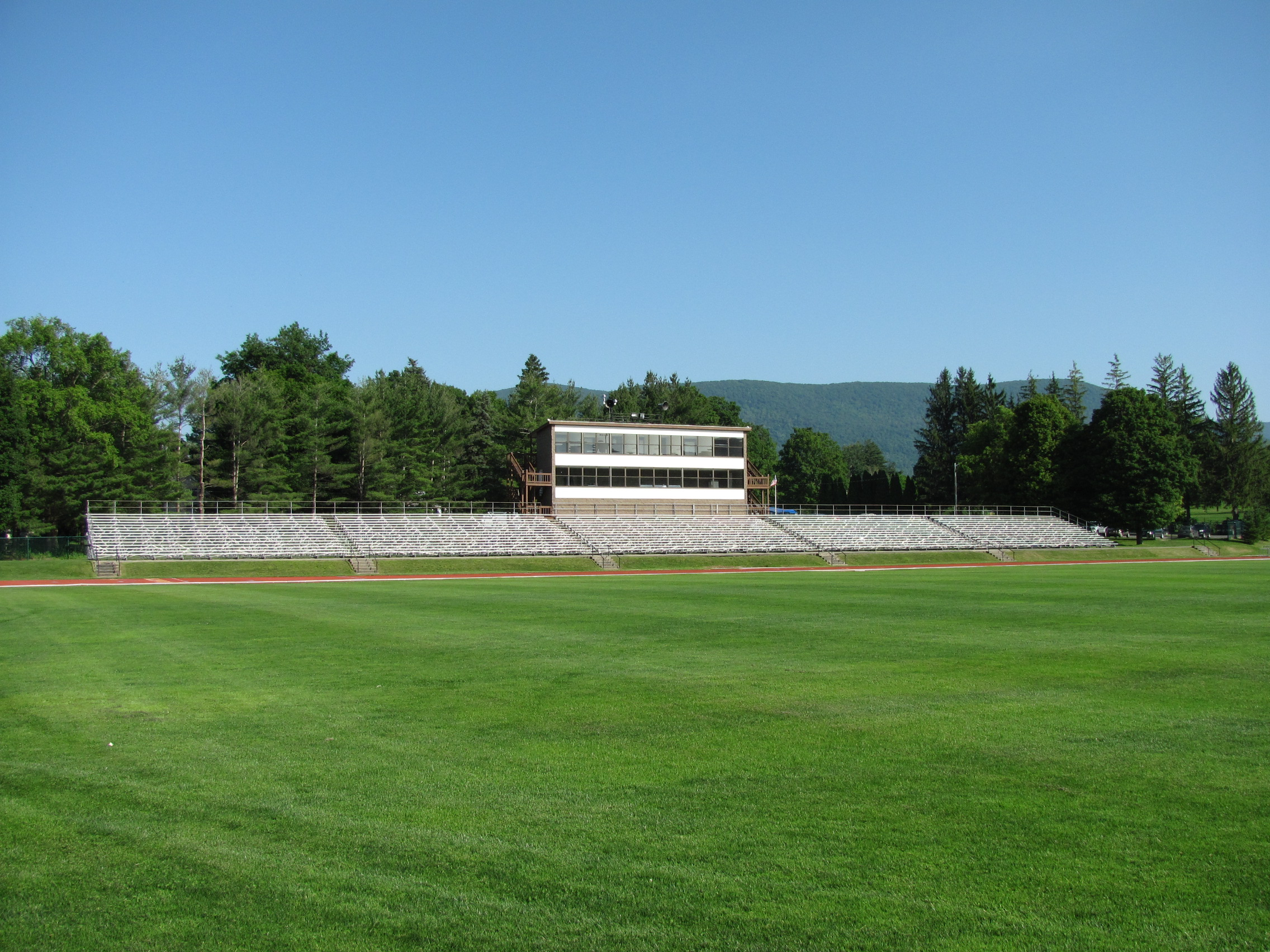
Weston Field Grandstand & Press Box constructed in 1987 and demolished in early 2014 to accommodate a synthetic turf playing field for football and lacrosse

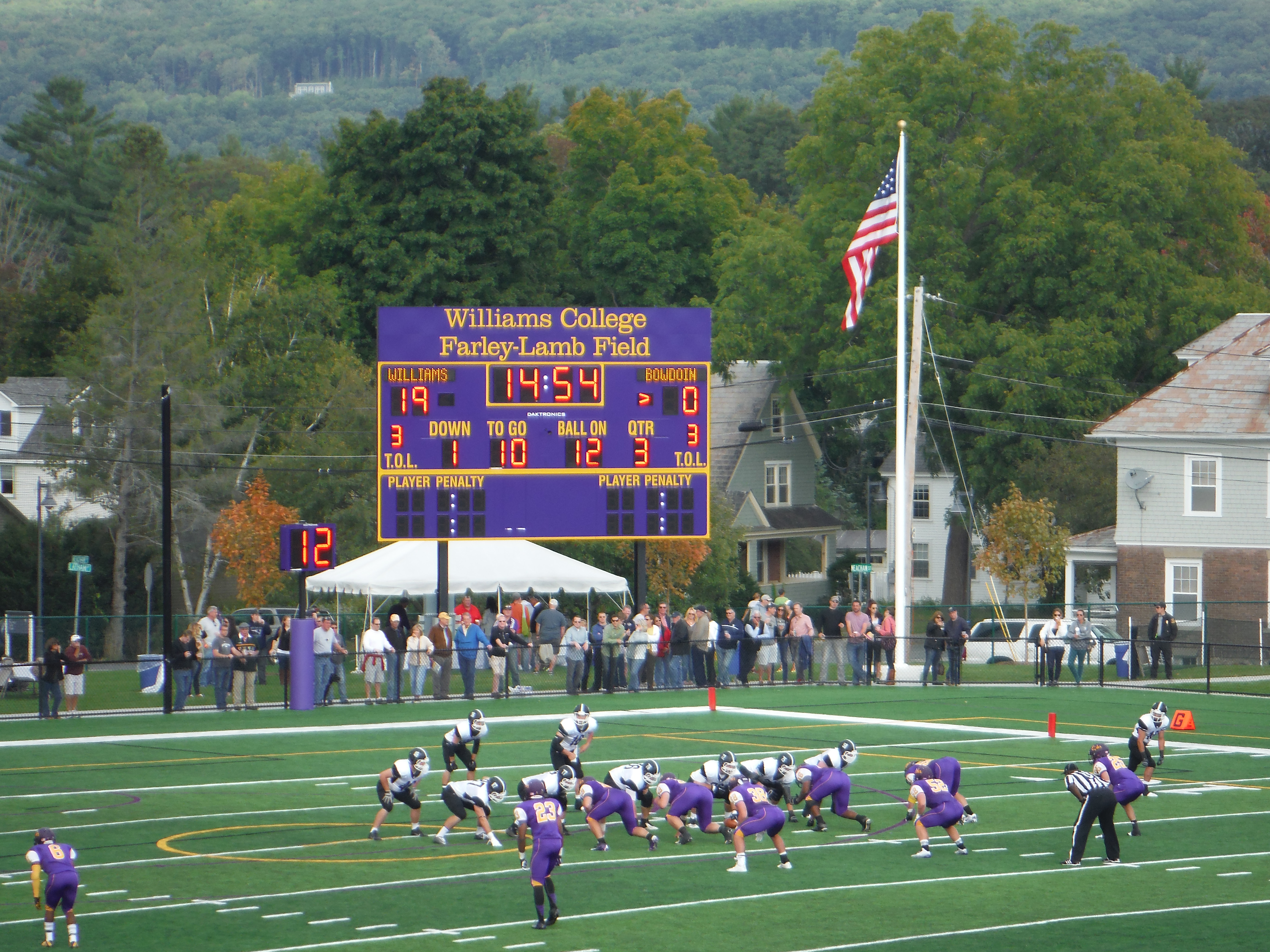
The Farley-Lamb playing field was completed in September 2014. In the image, a Williams Ephs football game

Weston Field is the home of Williams's football team. The field hosted its first football game in November 1883. It has a seated capacity of 10,000 spectators, with additional standing room. In November 1989, the Division III New England football single-game attendance record was set at Weston, when 13,671 spectators attended Williams's 17–14 victory over Amherst. In 2007, the field hosted College GameDay.

The field has undergone several renovations since its opening. In 1953, a press box was added and later upgraded in 1984. The field's bleacher seating areas have been renovated in 1972, 1984, and 1995. An electronic scoreboard was added in 1969. A play clock was installed in 1998. In 2008, the field was scheduled to undergo $17.6 million renovations, in which the playing surface would be reoriented and the locker rooms, training areas, seating areas, and parking lots improved, but those renovations were indefinitely postponed due to the 2008 financial crisis. In October 2012, however, a new, $22 million renovation plan for the field was announced, and was completed in time for the 2014 season. The completed Weston Field Athletic Complex allows year round athletic activity for several sports

=== Chandler Gymnasium ===
Chandler Gymnasium, a part of the larger Chandler Athletic Center, is the home of Williams's men's and women's basketball teams and women's volleyball team. The gym opened in 1987 and is named for Williams's 12th president, John Wesley Chandler. Prior to Chandler's opening, the basketball and volleyball programs played in Lasell Gymnasium. The gym has a capacity of 1,561 spectators. For the 2010–2011 season, the team ranked 20th in Division III in average game attendance, averaging 876 spectators per home game.

In home games between January 16, 2001, and January 4, 2005, Williams's men's basketball team had a 64-game home unbeaten streak, the current NCAA Division III record.

=== Lansing Chapman Rink ===
Lansing Chapman Rink is the home of Williams's men's and women's ice hockey teams and can also be configured for indoor men's and women's tennis. The Williams men's ice hockey team has used the rink since its construction in 1953. Prior to that, the team played on a pond near Cole Field. Despite Lansing Chapman's construction, hockey continued to be an outdoor sport until a canopy was added in 1962. The rink's dimensions are 200 ft. x 85 ft. It has a capacity of 2,500 spectators.

A sound system was added to the rink in 1973. The locker rooms were renovated in 1993, 1995, and 2005.

In addition to Williams athletics, the rink has hosted the figure skating competition of the Winter Bay State Games.

=== Cole Field ===
Cole Field, a part of the larger Cole Field athletic complex, is the home of Williams's men's and women's soccer programs. The field includes two regulations soccer pitches to allow the men's and women's teams to play simultaneously. It hosted the 1993 and 1995 Division III men's soccer finals, along with the 1996 Division III women's soccer finals.

Since its opening, the field has received several improvements. An electronic scoreboard was installed for the men's field in 1969 and upgraded in 1993. The women's field received an electronic scoreboard in 1999. In 2005, the men's field had drainage systems installed and was resodded.

=== Bobby Coombs Field ===
Prior to the 2005 season, $500,000 Bobby Coombs Field was built as part of the Cole Field Athletic Complex. The field features a permanent outfield fence, dugouts, bullpens, and a drainage system. Its dimensions are 330 ft. down the foul lines, 375 ft. in the gaps, and 400 ft. in center field.

In addition to regular season competition, the field hosts high school baseball showcases.

=== Renzie Lamb Field ===
Renzie Lamb Field, the home of the men's and women's lacrosse and women's field hockey programs, is located next to Weston Field. The field, which cost approximately $2 million, was dedicated on October 16, 2004. The field is also used occasionally by the men's and women's soccer programs if Cole Field is unplayable.

=== Williams Softball Complex ===
The Williams Softball Complex, part of the larger Cole Field Athletic Complex, features dugouts, bleacher seating, and a permanent fence. In 1998, a new backstop was installed. The playing surface was renovated in 2000 and 2006. Also in 2006, a new outfield fence was installed.

=== Taconic Golf Club ===
Taconic Golf Club, the home of the men's and women's golf teams, is located next to campus. The college owns the 18-hole, par 71, 6,808-yard course, which was built in 1927. It has been ranked by Golfweek the 2nd best collegiate course and 83rd best classic course in the world.

It has hosted several major tournaments, including the 1956 U.S. Junior Amateur and the 1963 U.S. Women's Amateur. A marker on the 14th hole commemorates Jack Nicklaus's famous hole-in-one there during the 1956 tournament. It has also hosted the 1958 NCAA Division I Men's Golf Championships, the 1972 NCAA Division II Men's Golf Championships, and the 1999 NCAA Division III Men's Golf Championships.

=== Torrence M. Hunt Tennis Center ===
The Torrence M. Hunt Tennis Center, the home of Williams's men's and women's tennis teams, features six tournament courts. Twelve additional courts (four of which are currently tournament-quality) are also used during practices and large tournaments. The Chaffee Tennis House stands at one end of the complex and features a viewing deck for spectators. The venue hosted the 1998 Division III Men's Tennis Championships.

=== Samuelson-Muir Pool ===
Samuelson-Muir Pool, part of the Chandler Athletic Complex, is the home of the men's and women's swimming & diving programs. Opened in 1988, it was dedicated in 2000 to Robert B. Muir and Carl R. Samuelson, both former head coaches of the swimming & diving programs. It has a capacity of 400 spectators.

=== Simon Squash Center ===
The Simon Squash Center, a part of the Chandler Athletic Complex, features 12 glass-backed squash courts. The center was dedicated in 1998 to the family of William E. Simon Jr., a Williams alumnus who captained the squash team in his time at the school.

=== Lasell Gymnasium ===
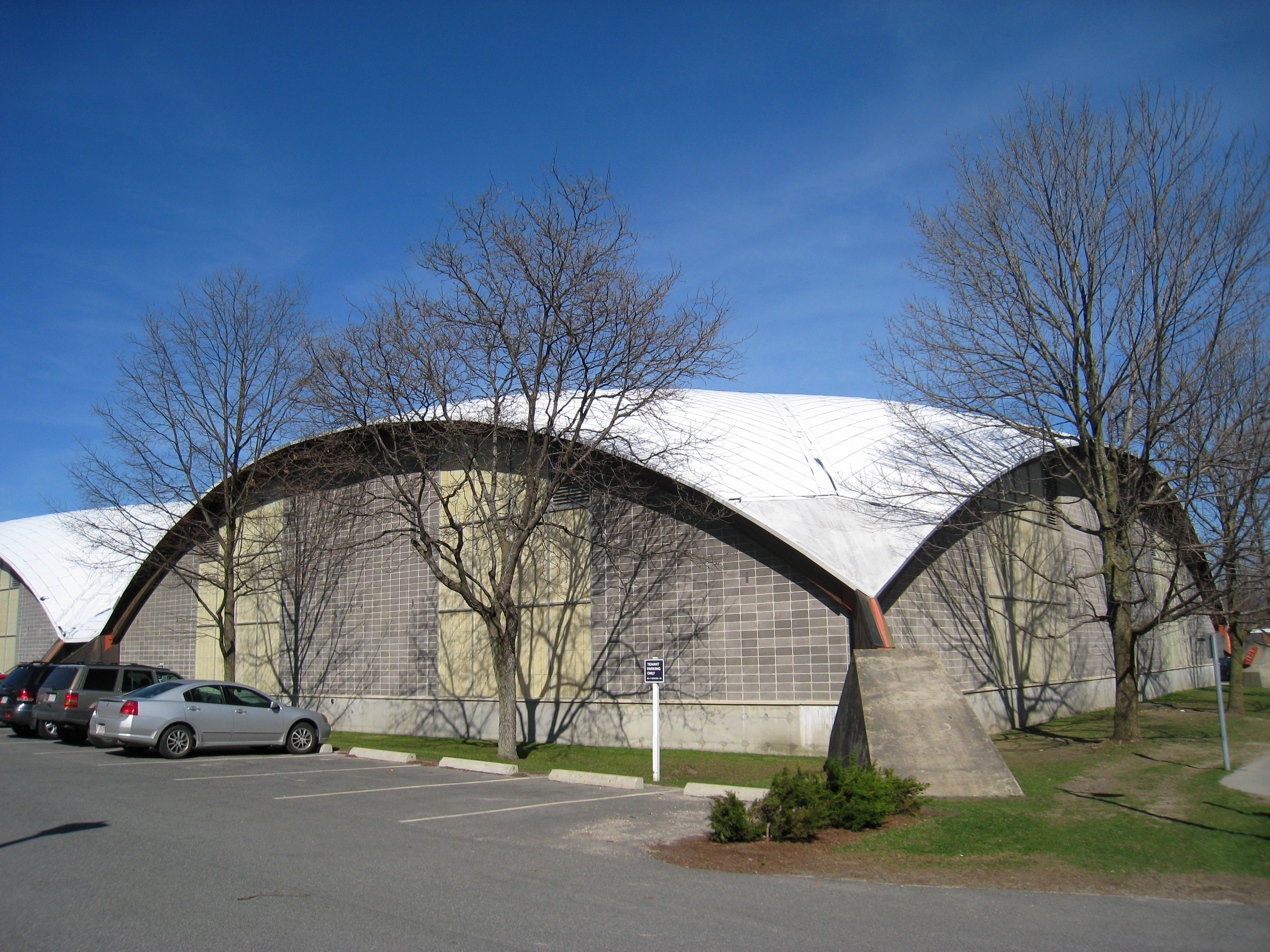
Towne Field House

Lasell Gymnasium, part of the Chandler Athletic Complex, is the home of the college's men's wrestling program. It was built in 1886 and was the home of the men's and women's basketball teams prior to the 1987 opening of Chandler Gymnasium.

The gymnasium also includes a practice area for the golf team.

=== Tony Plansky Track ===
The Tony Plansky Track, used by the men's and women's outdoor track & field programs, rings Weston Field. The 400-meter track was installed in 1987.

=== Towne Field House ===
The Towne Field House is the home of the men's and women's indoor track & field programs and also has indoor practice facilities for a number of outdoor sports. It opened in September 1970.

== Traditions ==
=== Mascot ===
The origin of the college's mascot, the Purple Cow, is believed to be the following 1895 poem by Frank Gelett Burgess:

I never saw a purple cow
I never hope to see one
But I can tell you anyhow
I'd rather see than be one.

In 1907, Williams students began publishing a humor magazine named the Purple Cow, which credited its name to Burgess' poem. Over the following decades, the mascot gained widespread acceptance.

=== "Yard by Yard" ===
The following traditional song was once often sung at Williams sporting events, but its current use is limited.

Yard by yard we'll fight our way
Thro' Amherst's line,
Every man on every play,
Striving all the time.
Cheer on cheer will rend the air,
All behind our men.
And we'll fight for dear old Williams
And we'll win and win again.

=== The Walk ===
The Walk, which began in 1971, is a post-game tradition of the Williams football team. If Williams wins its homecoming football game, played against either Amherst or Wesleyan, the team walks up Spring Street to St. Pierre's Barber Shop. There, they enjoy cold beverages and cigars and subject underclassmen players to embarrassing haircuts. The Walk was named the best post-game tradition in America by Sports Illustrated in 1992.

== National championships ==
From the formation of the NCAA through 1961, Williams allowed its teams to compete in the NCAA postseason. In 1961, the men's basketball program qualified for the College Division tournament. After defeating Rochester (NY) in the first round and Bates in the regional championship, the team advanced to the national quarterfinals against Wittenberg. Williams lost the game, 64–51, and the unruly celebrations of Wittenberg students led Williams administrators to decide the school should no longer compete in national tournaments. When the NESCAC formed in 1971, the league's other ten members adopted Williams's policy. Despite this ban, the women's swimming & diving team won the 1982 and 1983 national championships by qualifying enough individuals to outscore all other teams. The ban was lifted for the 1993–1994 academic year for all sports except football.

The following is a list of Williams's 37 national championships. Williams's total is tied for the most in the NESCAC with Middlebury.

=== Men's ===
Sport	Year(s)
Basketball	2003
Cross country	1994, 1995
Soccer	1995
Tennis	1999, 2001, 2002, 2013

=== Women's ===
Sport	Year(s)
Cross country	2002, 2004, 2015
Golf	2015
Rowing	2002, 2006, 2007, 2008, 2009, 2010, 2011, 2012, 2013
Soccer	2015, 2017, 2018
Swimming & diving	1982, 1983
Indoor track & field	2007, 2019
Tennis	2001, 2002, 2008, 2009, 2010, 2011, 2012, 2013, 2015, 2017

== Notable alumni ==
- Josh Bolton, class of 2006, men's soccer; professional soccer player
- John Bray, class of 1900, men's track & field; bronze medalist in the men's 1500 meters at the 1900 Summer Olympics
- Ethan Brooks, class of 1996, football; National Football League player
- Horace Brown, class of 1919, men's track & field; gold medalist in the men's 3000 meters team and individual races at the 1920 Summer Olympics
- Erin Burnett, class of 1998, field hockey and women's lacrosse; CNN journalist and news anchor
- Dan Calichman, class of 1990, men's soccer; United States men's national soccer team player
- Artie Clarke, class of 1889, baseball; Major League Baseball player for the New York Giants
- Dave Clawson, class of 1989, football and men's basketball; Bowling Green State University football coach
- Stephen Danbusky, class of 1999, men's soccer; professional soccer player
- Iron Davis, class of 1912, baseball; Major League Baseball player
- Jim Duquette, class of 1988, baseball; Major League Baseball general manager and broadcaster
- Pat Duquette, class of 1993, basketball; head coach, UMass Lowell.
- Robert F. Engle, class of 1964, men's lacrosse; 2003 laureate of the Nobel Prize in Economics
- Alexander Fetter, class of 1958, men's soccer and men's skiing; Rhodes Scholar and physicist
- Mark Filley, class of 1933, baseball and men's basketball; Major League Baseball player for the Washington Senators
- Robert Leavitt, class of 1907, men's track & field; gold medalist in the men's 110 meter hurdles at the 1906 Summer Olympics
- Edward M. Lewis, class of 1896, baseball; Major League Baseball player and university president
- James Ross MacDonald, class of 1944, men's swimming & diving; Rhodes Scholar and physicist
- Mike Masters, class of 1989, soccer; United States men's national soccer team player
- Jack Mills, class of 1911, baseball; Major League Baseball player
- Kevin Morris, class of 1986, football and baseball; college football coach, currently the offensive coordinator at Yale
- Bill Otis, class of 1912, baseball; Major League Baseball player for the New York Highlanders
- Dave Paulsen, class of 1987, men's basketball; Bucknell University basketball coach
- Barbara Prey, class of 1979, women's tennis and women's squash; Fulbright Scholar and artist
- Bill Simon, class of 1973, men's squash; businessman and politician, whose family is the namesake of Williams's Simon Squash Center
- George Steinbrenner, class of 1952, football and men's track & field; owner of the New York Yankees
- Hal Steinbrenner, class of 1991, men's track & field; part-owner of the New York Yankees
- Khari Stephenson, class of 2004, men's soccer; former professional soccer player, and member of the Jamaican National team
- Faye Sultan, class of 2016, women's swimming & diving; Kuwaiti Olympic swimmer
- Fay Vincent, class of 1960, football and men's track & field; commissioner of Major League Baseball, 1989–1992
