= Mount Raimer =

Mountain in New York, United States

Highest point
- Elevation: 2,572 ft (784 m)
- Coordinates: 42°42′59″N 73°17′01″W

Geography
- Location: Williamstown, Massachusetts and Rensselaer County, New York
- Parent range: Taconic Mountains

Geology
- Rock age: Ordovician
- Mountain type(s): Thrust fault; metamorphic rock and sedimentary rock

Climbing
- Easiest route: Taconic Crest Trail

Mount Raimer, 2,572 feet (784 m), is a prominent peak in the Taconic Mountains of western Massachusetts and adjacent New York. The west side and summit are located in New York; the east slopes lie within Massachusetts. The summit ridge is part meadow and part wooded with red spruce, balsam fir, and northern hardwood tree species. It is notable for its views of the Hoosic River valley and Hudson River Valley. The 35 mi (56 km) Taconic Crest Trail traverses the mountain. Much of the upper slopes and summit are within protected conservation land. The mountain is the location of a defunct ski area.

== Geography ==
Mount Raimer is located within Williamstown, Massachusetts and the New York towns of Petersburgh and Berlin. The Taconic Mountains continue south from Mount Raimer as Berlin Mountain and north as the White Rock ridgeline. It is flanked to the east by several hills that precede the Hoosic River Valley and the town of Williamstown. The west side of the mountain drains into the Little Hoosic River, thence into the Hoosic River, the Hudson River. The east side drains into the Hoosic River. Petersburg Pass, located on New York Route 2/ Massachusetts Route 2, cuts over the gap between Mount Raimer and the next summit to the north, Smith Hill, at an elevation of 1,650 feet (500 m), just .75 miles (1.21 km) north of the summit of Mount Raimer.

== Alpine skiing ==
Petersburg Pass Ski Area (closed)
- Interactive map of Petersburg Pass Ski Area (closed)
- Location: Petersburgh, New York, US
- Nearest city: Troy
- Trails: 9
- Lift system: 1 double chair, 1 surface lift

Mount Raimer was home to lift served alpine skiing for nearly two decades. Originally known as Petersburg Pass Ski Area, the base lodge and parking lots were located adjacent to the height of land on New York State Route 2.

Started in 1962, the ski area featured a variety of trails served by a Poma double chairlift. A novice surface lift was added below the base area in 1964.

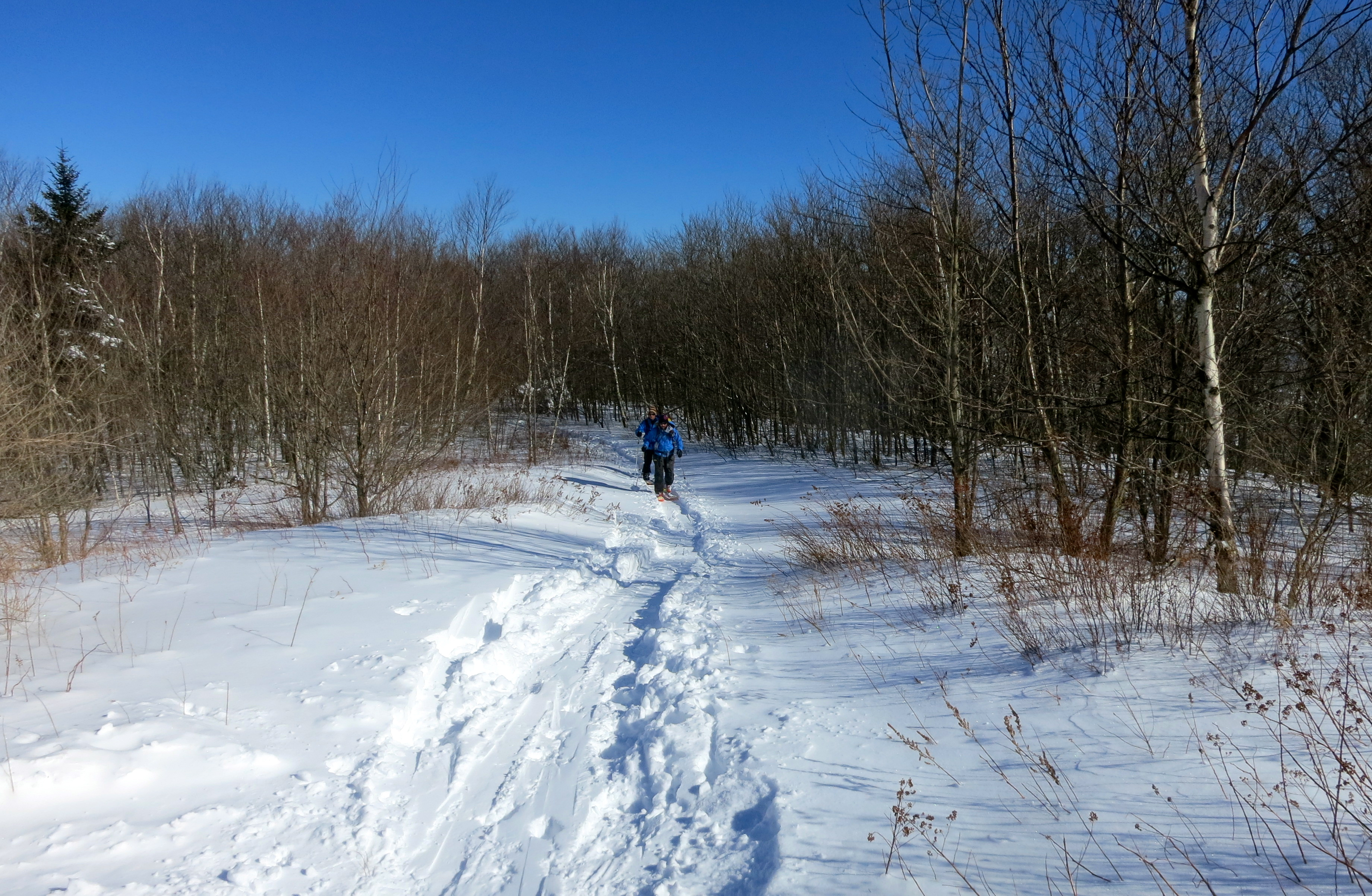
A 2014 photo of one of the backcountry ski trails near the summit of Mount Raimer

Due to a variety of reasons, including the steep ascent up Route 2 and the lack of water for snowmaking, the ski area struggled through much of its existence. As a result, the ski area failed to operate for multiple seasons in the 1970s. In addition, Petersburg Pass Ski Area was renamed twice in order to try to rebrand its image. After a short time as Taconic Trails, the ski area was last known as Mount Raimer. An attempt was made to dramatically expand the ski area during its final years, as trails were cut on the western face of the mountain. This expansion was never completed and the ski area went out of business in 1980. Recently, since about 2010, there has been a renewed interest in the area for backcountry skiing on a couple of the defunct trails and glades.

The double chairlift was later sold to Ski Butternut.
