= Doll Mountain =

Mountain in Massachusetts, United States

Highest point
- Elevation: 1,930 ft (590 m)
- Parent peak: N 42.45962 W 73.34558
- Coordinates: 42.45962°N 73.34558°W

Geography
- Location: Berkshire County, Massachusetts
- Parent range: Taconic Mountains

Geology
- Rock age: Ordovician
- Mountain type(s): Thrust fault; metamorphic rock and sedimentary rock

Climbing
- Easiest route: Doll Mountain Trail and bushwack

Doll Mountain, 1,930 feet (590 m), is a prominent peak in the Taconic Mountains of western Massachusetts. The mountain is located in Pittsfield State Forest. The summit is wooded and trailless, but the multi-use Doll Mountain Trail traverses its northern slopes. The mountain is wooded with northern hardwood tree species.

Doll Mountain is located within Hancock, Massachusetts. The Taconic ridgeline continues north from Doll Mountain as Smith Mountain, south as Holy Mount and its ridge spur called Mount Lebanon, and to the east as Shaker Mountain. It is bordered by West Hill and The Knob to the west across the Wyomanock Creek valley. The west side of the mountain drains into Wyomanock Creek, then into Kinderhook Creek, thence into the Hudson River and Long Island Sound. The east side drains into Lily Brook, thence to the Housatonic River and Long Island Sound.
