= Commonwealth Connections =

Commonwealth Connections logo

Commonwealth Connections is a greenway and conservation initiative co-developed by the Commonwealth of Massachusetts Department of Conservation and Recreation (DCR), the National Park Service, and over fifty trail and land conservation agencies and non-profit organizations. Begun in 1999, the initiative was designed to create "a coordinated greenway and trail network that will help conserve important resources, provide recreation and alternative transportation opportunities close to where people live, and connect communities throughout Massachusetts."

The initiative is loosely based on the grassroots success of the Appalachian Trail and on Frederick Law Olmsted's Emerald Necklace vision of an interconnected greenway linking metropolitan Boston parkland; it includes the development of new trails, maintenance and rehabilitation of existing trails, environmental and experiential education, land conservation, and support for research, stewardship, and regional conservation planning. Emphasis is on both local and multi-regional cooperative projects (rural, suburban, and urban), and includes hiking trails, universal access trails, bicycling and mountain biking trails, river corridors, as well as recreational trails used for motorized vehicles. The Massachusetts DCR contributes to the Commonwealth Connections program by enabling trails projects through providing town agencies and non-profit organizations with information, education, training, and matching grants.

== Priorities ==
Initial efforts (2003) of the Commonwealth Connections initiative produced a teleologic greenway proposal map, a seven part strategy for greenway development, and a series of recommendations based on region.

=== Strategies ===
The seven strategies proposed are:

1. Protect and promote long-distance trail corridors as primary spines of the Massachusetts Greenway and Trail System. This strategy emphasizes increased protection and maintenance of the 600 miles (970 km) of existing long-distance trails in the state of Massachusetts which would serve as "spines" for further and more extensive greenway development. Trails include the Appalachian Trail, Metacomet-Monadnock Trail, Midstate Trail, Warner Trail, Bay Circuit, and Taconic Trails. The strategy proposes earmarking these trails for federal and state funding; working with government, non-profit, and private entities to protect trail corridors; increasing tax break incentives to landowners who allow trail easements through their property; and completing protection of 200 miles (320 km) of these trails by 2010.

2.Protect critical river corridors and their tributaries statewide. This strategy would build on the success of federal and state river protection programs to further conserve river corridors and habitat in Massachusetts. Specific strategies would include earmarking critical corridors and habitat for state and federal funding; enforcing river protection efforts via education and outreach; ensuring the creation and protection of public river access points and walkways; and facilitating the creation of zoning laws to protect river corridors and public access areas.

3.Strategically link important natural and human communities. The purpose of this strategy would be to strengthen the viability of existing recreational areas and habitats by extending them and linking them to each other and to inhabited areas, thereby reducing habitat fragmentation, increasing resource awareness through the proliferation of public contact points, and expanding the recreational value of previously isolated resource islands. Specifics here would include identifying potential links between existing resources and focusing funds on the creation of such links; using such links as a way of connecting resources to population centers; and linking ecologically important areas to greenways as a way of economically combining both ecologic and recreational conservation efforts.

4.Create a cross-state multi-use trail reaching from Boston to the Berkshires. This effort would address the lack of east-west greenway corridors in the state and the strategic difficulty of developing such greenways (most current greenways are north-south corridors). This strategy identifies abandoned railway beds as possible routes. Specific efforts here would include developing state-wide coalitions to address the creation of and east-west greenways. (The goal of securing these east-west corridor trail elements by 2003 was recently met by the development and extension of several rails-to-trails projects in the east, west, and central parts of the state).

5. ‘Trail bank’ unused rail corridors and work to gain public access to utility corridors. Strategies here include forging agreements that would make use of electric, gas, road, and rail right-of-ways as potential linear greenway routes, especially in areas where existing development has isolated open space parcels. This strategy would involve working with the Massachusetts Bay Transportation Authority to identify and transfer surplus utility corridors to towns and cities for the use of greenways at no cost. It would also facilitate the creation of emergency loans for towns and cities for the purchase of defunct utility corridors. Finally, it would establish partnerships with utility companies to address liability and access issues.

6. Assist the greenways and trails development community with technical support and funding needed to establish a coordinated statewide greenway system. This strategy would involve the creation of a "public clearinghouse" of resources: human, technical, and financial; engage in outreach and support initiatives geared toward helping local greenway development efforts; and establish a flow of information between various state, federal, non-profit, and private entities with the aim of increasing overall efficacy.

7. Increase funding for greenways and trails. Efforts here are aimed at: creating legislative opportunities that would increase existing funding and provide new, creative funding possibilities; maximizing the effective use of existing federal transportation funds currently allocated for greenway development; using existing state funded programs such as the Land and Water Conservation Fund and Urban Self-Help programs as greenways development catalysts by ranking greenway initiatives as a high priority.

=== Regional recommendations ===
The Commonwealth Commons plan divides the state into five regions, Berkshires, Connecticut River Valley, Central Massachusetts, Southeast Massachusetts, Metropolitan Boston, and Northeast Massachusetts.

The Berkshires region includes the Berkshire mountains, from the eastern limit of those mountains to the western boundary of the state. Suggested recommendations and projects for this section include securing protection for the area's major long distance trails (the Appalachian Trail, the Taconic Trails, and the Mahican-Mohawk Trail); creating greenway links between the Taconic Trails and Appalachian Trail; creating new greenway corridors that would link open space parcels within the Berkshires; promoting, protecting, and creating a Housatonic River greenway; creating a bikeway that would run from Connecticut to Vermont and include the Ashuwillticook Rail Trail; and creating and protecting a greenway along the federally designated wild and scenic Westfield River.

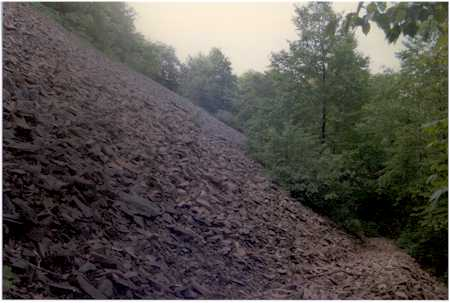
The Metacomet-Monadnock Trail passing along talus slope

The Connecticut River Valley region includes an area from the eastern front of the Berkshires east to western Worcester County. Initiatives in this area would include the protection of the sub-ranges of the Metacomet Ridge; the linking of the trails on the Metacomet Ridge to the Connecticut River; protection of the Connecticut River and its tributaries including the Deerfield, Westfield, and Millers rivers; creating east-west rail trail greenways through the region using the Norwottuck Rail Trail, Northampton Bike Path, Manhan Rail Trail, and the Amherst Bikeway, as well as new trails; developing greenways that would link together areas notable for their biodiversity, natural features, and recreational opportunities; securing and protecting existing long distance trail corridors through the region, including the Metacomet-Monadnock Trail, Robert Frost Trail, Pocumtuck Ridge Trail, and Mahican-Mohawk Trail; and creating a loop trail through the outlying areas of the Quabbin Reservoir watershed.

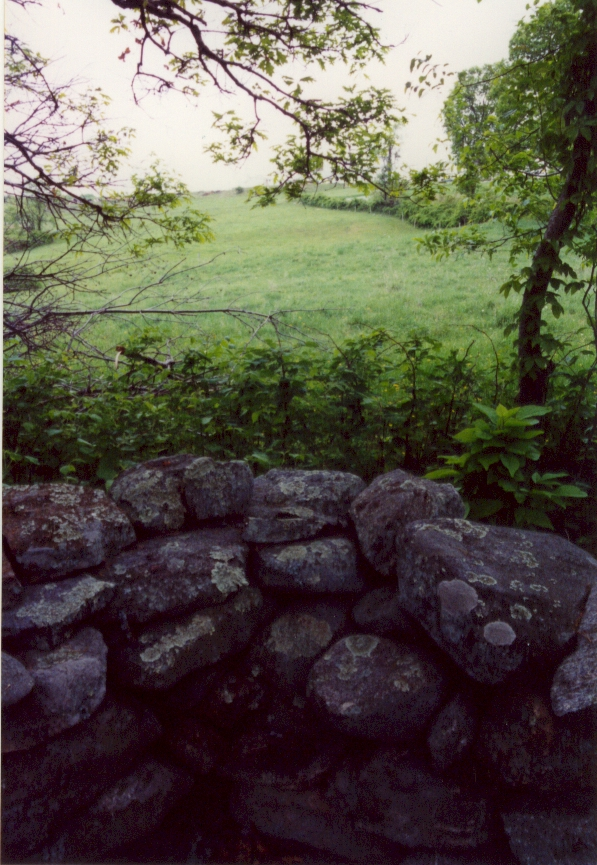
Agrarian view along the Midstate Trail

Central Massachusetts includes most of Worcester County east to the outlying suburbs of Boston between I-495 and Massachusetts Route 128. Recommendations for this region would include securing and protecting the Midstate Trail; the development and support of rail and canal trails such as the Mass Central Rail Trail, East Coast Greenway, Nashua River Rail Trail, and Blackstone River Bikeway; protecting water quality, natural resources and recreational opportunities along major riverways in central Massachusetts such as the Blackstone River, Sudbury River, Nashua River, Squannacook River, Nissitissit River, and others.

Southeast Massachusetts includes the part of the state south of suburban Boston and extending east and south through Cape Cod and the islands of Nantucket and Martha's Vineyard. Initiatives would include the creation of "River Greenways" along the major rivers within this region; the creation an east-west greenway through this area by linking major state parks and other protected open space; the protection and extension of existing greenways such as the Bay Circuit Trail and the Cape Cod Rail Trail; and the creation of a collaborative regional clearing-house of trail and conservation data to more effectively facilitate cooperative efforts between agencies and non-profits.

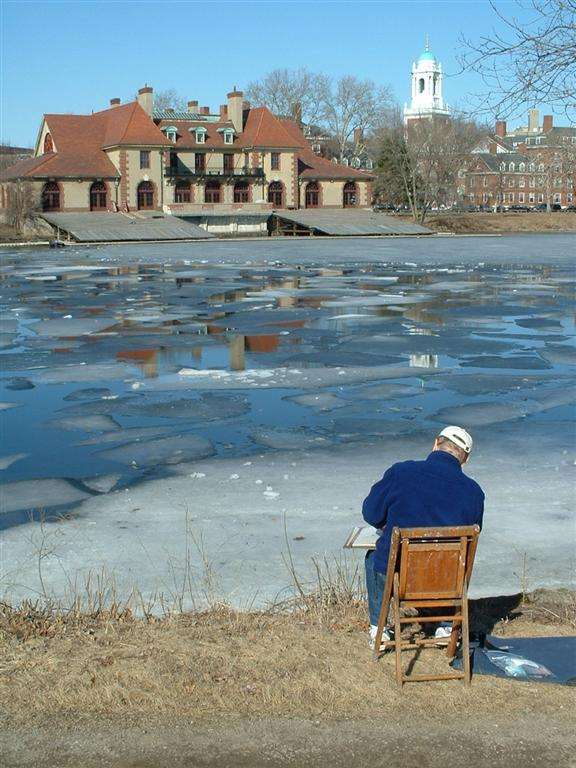
The Charles River

The Metropolitan Boston region includes Boston and its suburbs west toward Massachusetts Route 128. The goals of Commonwealth Connections in this region include protecting water quality, natural resources, and recreational opportunities along major riverways such as the Charles River, Concord River, Mystic River, and Neponset River; the creation of a network of interconnecting bicycle paths and trails through Boston and its suburbs; the completion of the Bay Circuit Trail; permanent protection for the Warner Trail and the creation of a link it to from Boston's Blue Hills Reservation; and support for the creation of a Boston Harborwalk and an East Boston Greenway.

Northeast Massachusetts includes the region north of the Boston suburbs and east of Worcester County. Initiatives in this region would include the protection of unused Massachusetts Bay Transportation Authority corridors for future conversion via rails-to trails programs; the protection of water quality, natural resources and recreational opportunities along major riverways such as the Merrimack River, Shawsheen River, and Ipswich River; creation of a Great Marsh Coastal Greenway linking the Parker River National Wildlife Refuge and Crane Beach; creation of bicycle and pedestrian corridors along Route 22 and Route 133, which would link now isolated scenic areas in the towns of Wenham, Hamilton, Manchester, Beverly, Essex, and Ipswich, Massachusetts; and the completion of the part of the Bay Circuit Trail which passes through the region.

== See also ==
- Appalachian Trail
- Metacomet-Monadnock Trail
- Midstate Trail
- East Coast Greenway
- Emerald Necklace
- Bay Circuit Trail
- Warner Trail
- Taconic Trails
- Mahican-Mohawk Trail
