= Berlin Mountain =

Mountain in New York near the border with Massachusetts, United States

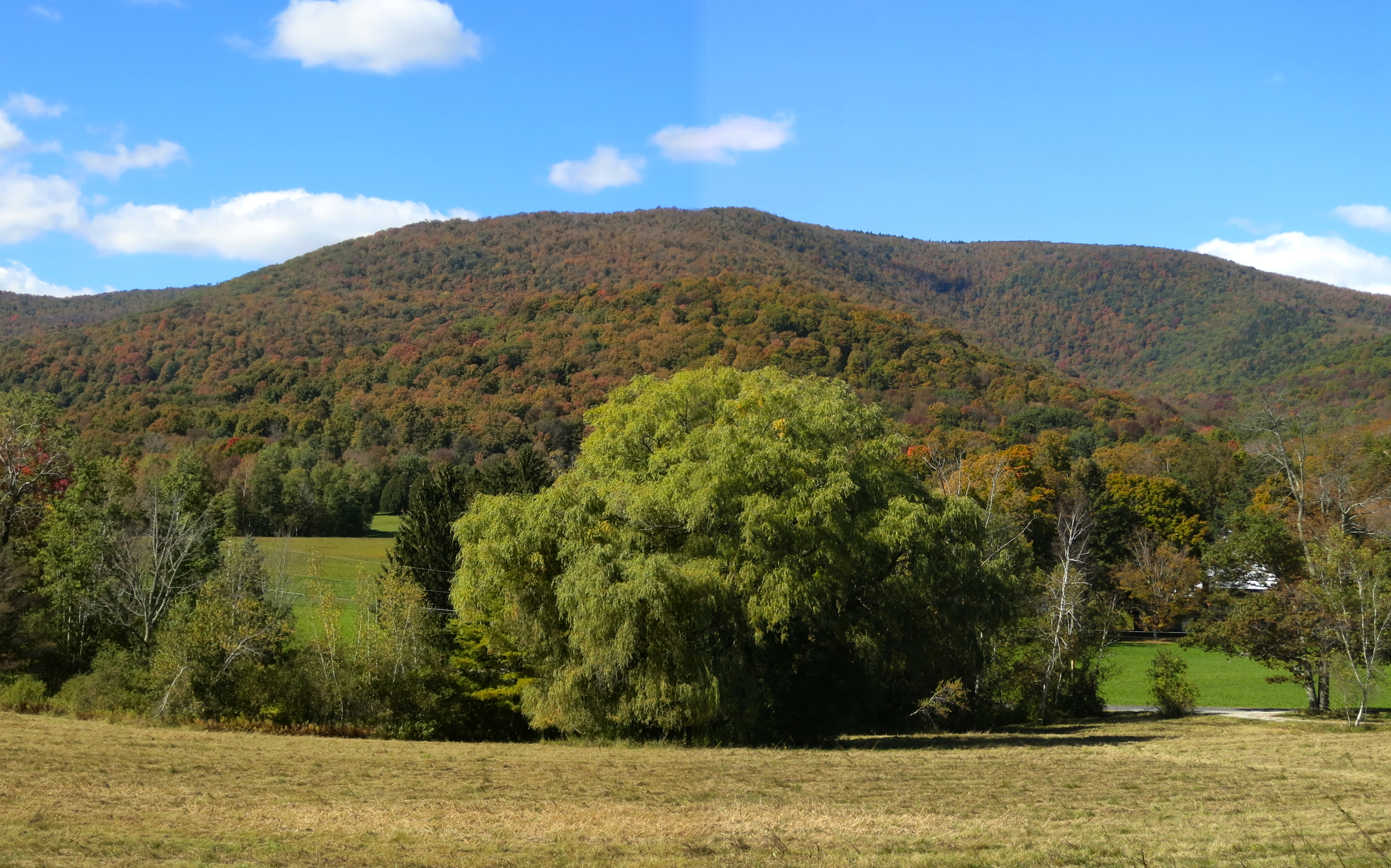
- Berlin Mountain viewed from the east in South Williamstown, Massachusetts

Highest point
- Elevation: 2,818 ft (859 m)
- Coordinates: 42°41′32″N 73°17′09″W

Geography
- Location within New York Location within the United States
- Location: Berlin, New York and Williamstown, Massachusetts
- Parent range: Taconic Mountains
- Topo map: USGS Berlin

Geology
- Rock age: Ordovician
- Mountain type(s): Thrust fault; metamorphic rock and sedimentary rock

Climbing
- Easiest route: '09 Trail

Berlin Mountain is a 2,818-foot-tall (859 m) peak in the Taconic Mountains. Located within the Taconic Ridge State Forest in Berlin, Rensselaer County, New York, it is the highest point in Rensselaer County, and the highest peak of the Taconic Range residing in New York State. The New York/Massachusetts state line lies just east of the summit; this results in the summit and west side of the mountain being located in New York, while the east side lies within Williamstown, Massachusetts. The mountain is notable for its grassy summit. The 37-mile (60 km) Taconic Crest Trail traverses the mountain. Several other hiking trails approach the summit from the east. Much of the upper slopes and summit are within protected conservation land. Historically the lower slopes of the mountain were farmed heavily throughout the 19th Century. In addition to agriculture, there are several remnants of charcoal kilns located on the mountain that produced fuel for iron smelting.

== History ==
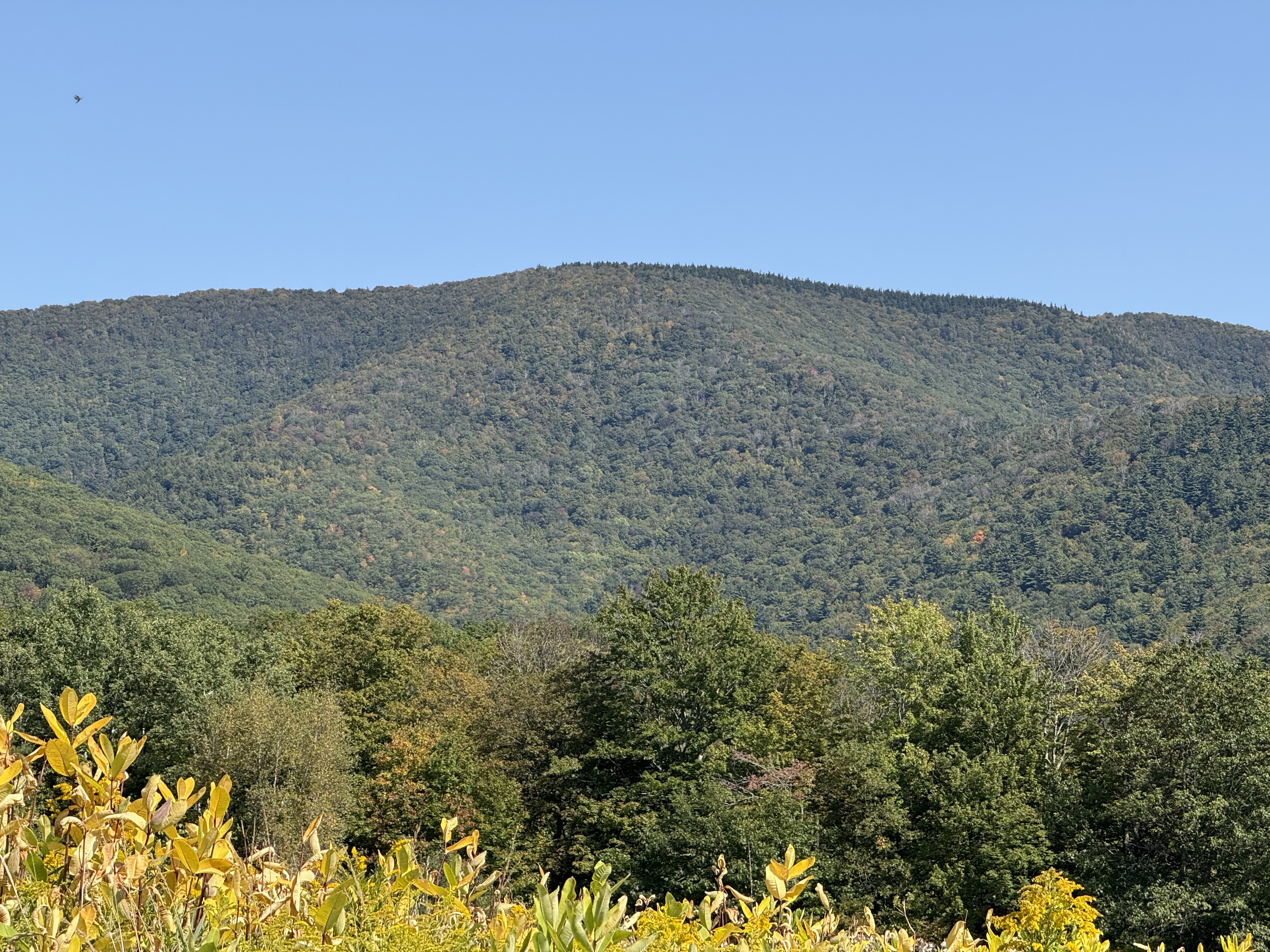
Berlin Mountain seen from Berlin

Around 1915, the Commonwealth of Massachusetts built a 50-foot-tall (15 m) steel fire lookout tower on the mountain. The tower was one of two that were built to replace the tower on Mount Greylock, which had poor visibility. In 1921, New York State expanded its forest fire detection and control responsibilities to the area east of the Hudson River, due to advice from the United States Forest Service. The area included parts of Washington County and all of Rensselaer, Columbia and Dutchess counties, under District Forest Ranger Henry A. Teal. The states of Vermont, New York and Massachusetts shared in the funding of the operation of the tower for about three years. Along this boundary, Massachusetts authorities would use the observation towers on Berlin Mountain, Osceola Mountain and Mount Everett to report fires to the nearest fire warden in New York. Similar agreements were made with the states of Connecticut, New Jersey and Pennsylvania with regard to different new districts that were established by New York. In 1922, the state of New York added forest fire observation stations at Number Seven Hill and Dickinson Hill, which are also both in Rensselaer County. Due to these additions, in late 1923, Massachusetts moved the tower to Brodie Mountain. The towers footings are all that remains from the tower on Berlin Mountain.
