= Taconic Skyline Trail =

Trail in Massachusetts, United States

Coordinates: 42.51°N 73.31°W

- Length: 12.1 mi (19.5 km)
- Location: Berkshire County, Massachusetts
- Use: Multi-use; primarily motorized
- Highest point: Jiminy Peak, 2,392 ft (729 m)
- Lowest point: U.S. Route 20, 1,400 ft (430 m)
- Difficulty: Moderately difficult
- Season: variable, depending on use
- Hazards: deer ticks, poison ivy, weather

The Taconic Skyline Trail is a 12.1 mi (19.5 km) multi-use trail in the Taconic Mountains of Berkshire County, Massachusetts. The trail extends from U.S. Route 20 in Hancock, Massachusetts, less than 1 mi (1.6 km) east of the New York border, north along the ridgecrest of the Taconic Range within Pittsfield State Forest and officially ending at Brodie Mountain Road on the Hancock/ Lanesborough town line.

Originally built as a hiking trail, the Taconic Skyline Trail sees heavy use by all-terrain vehicles and snowmobiles and is now officially maintained for primarily motorized use. The trail is used less frequently for mountain biking but is no longer recommended for hikers, who are encouraged to use the parallel, non-motorized Taconic Crest Trail. However, the trail is still open to hikers. Recent grants through the Massachusetts DCR's Commonwealth Connections project have provided 40,000 dollars to ATV clubs for trail surface rehabilitation.

Forest types the Taconic Skyline Trail are mixed oak-hickory forest and northern hardwood forest with alkaline-loving plant communities, and red spruce/ balsam fir stands on the higher summits. The geology is thrust faulted metamorphic rock over younger sedimentary rock.

== Trail details ==
The Taconic Skyline Trail was blazed in the 1930s by the Civilian Conservation Corps as a hiking trail, 25 miles (40 km) long, extending from Massachusetts Route 41 in Richmond to the northern end of Brodie Mountain in Williamstown. In the 1970s the trail over the northern 1/3 of Brodie Mountain fell into disuse and was soon obscured, shortening the trail to 21 miles (34 km). In the late 1990s, the southern section from Route 41 to Route 20 was officially closed, as was the northern section over the remaining 2/3 of Brodie Mountain. Unsanctioned use of these sections still occurs, however. At the same time, the Taconic Skyline Trail in Pittsfield State Forest was separated into two parallel trails: one retained the name Taconic Skyline and was designated a motorized and multi-use recreation trail by the Department of Conservation and Recreation; the other trail was added on to the southern end of the non-motorized Taconic Crest Trail, extending it by 6 miles (9.7 km).

Features along the trail include the highland Cranberry Pond and Twin Ponds, Doll Mountain, Smith Mountain, Tower Mountain, Berry Pond, 2,150 feet (660 m) (reputed the highest pond in Massachusetts), Poppy Mountain, Jiminy Peak, and Widow White's Peak. A state campground is located at Berry Pond.

== See also ==
- The Appalachian Trail
- Taconic Trails
