= Taconic Crest Trail =

Hiking trail in the north-eastern US

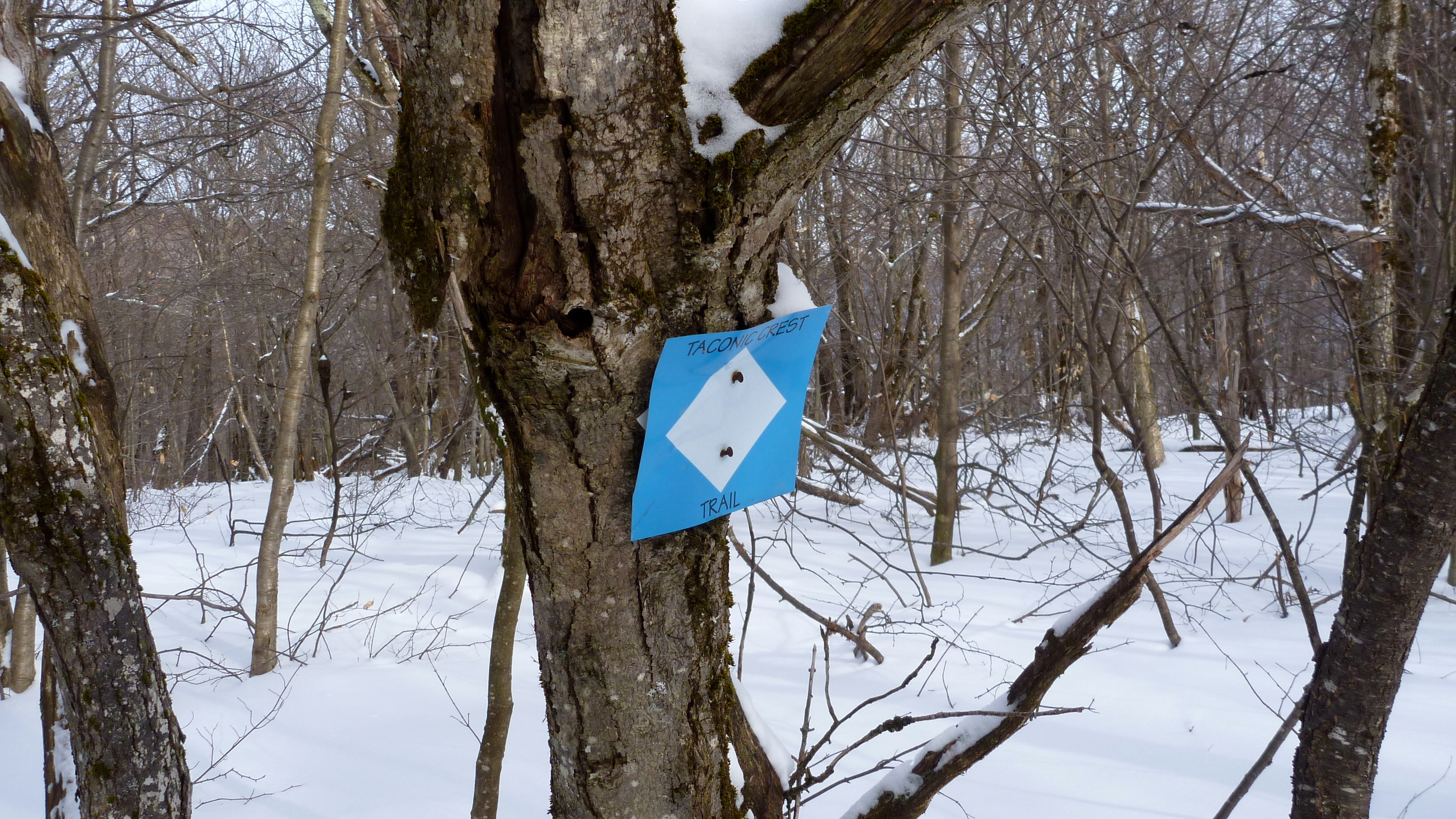
- Taconic Crest Trail marker
- Length: 37 mi (60 km)
- Location: Berkshire County, Massachusetts, Rensselaer County, New York, and Bennington County, Vermont
- Use: Hiking, backpacking, snowshoeing
- Highest point: Berlin Mountain, New York, 2,818 ft (859 m)
- Lowest point: NY Route 346, North Petersburgh, New York, 500 ft (150 m)
- Difficulty: Moderately difficult
- Season: easiest mid-May through early October
- Hazards: deer ticks, poison ivy, weather

The Taconic Crest Trail is a 37 mi (60 km) hiking trail in the Taconic Mountains in the northeastern United States. The trail extends from U.S. Route 20 in Hancock, Massachusetts, less than 1 mi (1.6 km) east of the New York border, north along the ridgecrest of the Taconic Range, first within Massachusetts, then weaving along the border of New York and Massachusetts and New York and Vermont, and ending in Petersburgh, New York, on NY Route 346, near the Vermont border. Much of the route has been conserved as state forest, conservation easement, or forest preserve.

Forest types on the Taconic Crest Trail are mixed oak-hickory forest and northern hardwood forest with microclimate summit balds, alkaline-loving plant communities, and red spruce/ balsam fir stands on the higher summits. The geology is thrust faulted metamorphic rock over younger sedimentary rock.

The Taconic Crest Trail passes through the New York towns of Stephentown, Berlin and Petersburgh; the Massachusetts towns of Hancock and Williamstown; and Pownal, Vermont. It is crossed by New York Route 2, Massachusetts Route 43, the seasonal Pittsfield State Forest Berry Pond Campground access road, and by Lebanon Springs Road in Hancock. The trail is supported by the New York State Department of Environmental Conservation (NYSDEC), the Taconic Hiking Club, the Trust for Public Land, the National Park Service, Williams College, Rensselaer Land Trust, the Massachusetts Department of Conservation and Recreation, and the Williamstown Rural Lands Foundation.

== Trail details ==
The trail utilizes two distinct ridgelines of the Taconic Mountains. From Route 20 north, the trail passes through Pittsfield State Forest in Massachusetts; features include the highland Cranberry Pond and Twin Ponds, Doll Mountain, Smith Mountain, Tower Mountain, and Berry Pond, 2,150 feet (660 m), reputedly the highest pond in Massachusetts. A state campground is located at Berry Pond.

From Berry Pond, the trail descends the ridgeline into the village of Hancock, Massachusetts, then ascends the second ridge, which straddles the New York border. Features along this section include Rounds Mountain, Misery Mountain, Berlin Mountain (the trail's high point), Mount Raimer, White Rock, and a crevasse called the Snow Hole where ice has been known to persist year round. The trail utilizes conservation land and easements including the Taconic Ridge State Forest (NYSDEC) and 2,500 acres (10 km^{2}) Hopkins Memorial Forest, owned and managed by Williams College.

The trail is marked with blue squares containing white blazes throughout its length. All NYSDEC portions of the trail are also posted with blue DEC markers. The trail follows a series of high, open summits and ridgeline overlooking the Hudson River Valley to the west. The entirety of the trail is open to hiking, backpacking, snowshoeing, cross-country skiing, and backcountry skiing, and many sections permit mountain biking, horseback riding and snowmobiling as well. Overnight camping is allowed on the trail; a seasonal campground with facilities is located at Berry Pond.

The Taconic Crest Trail originally extended 29 miles (47 km) from Berry Pond in Pittsfield State Forest to North Pownal, Vermont. In the late 1990s, the Taconic Skyline Trail in Pittsfield State Forest was separated into two parallel trails: one retained the name "Taconic Skyline" and was designated a motorized recreation trail; the other trail was added on to the southern end of the Taconic Crest Trail, extending it by 6 miles (10 km). To the north, in Vermont, the Taconic Crest Trail once extended into North Pownal, but was closed by request of a property owner; the trail terminus was re-routed north to a newly constructed DEC trailhead at NY Route 346 in North Petersburgh, New York. Not visible from the road, the new trailhead shares a driveway with a private residence and with an old, barred forest road, which are visible; box 25, on the south side of 346, marks the trailhead entrance. It is 0.3 miles (0.48 km) west of the "Entering NY" sign and 0.2 miles (0.32 km) from the railroad tracks. A NYSDEC access trail, marked yellow, still leads down to the former terminus of the trail, at the old Prosser Hollow trailhead.

== See also ==
- Appalachian Trail
- Taconic Trails
