= Lake Onota =

Onota Lake
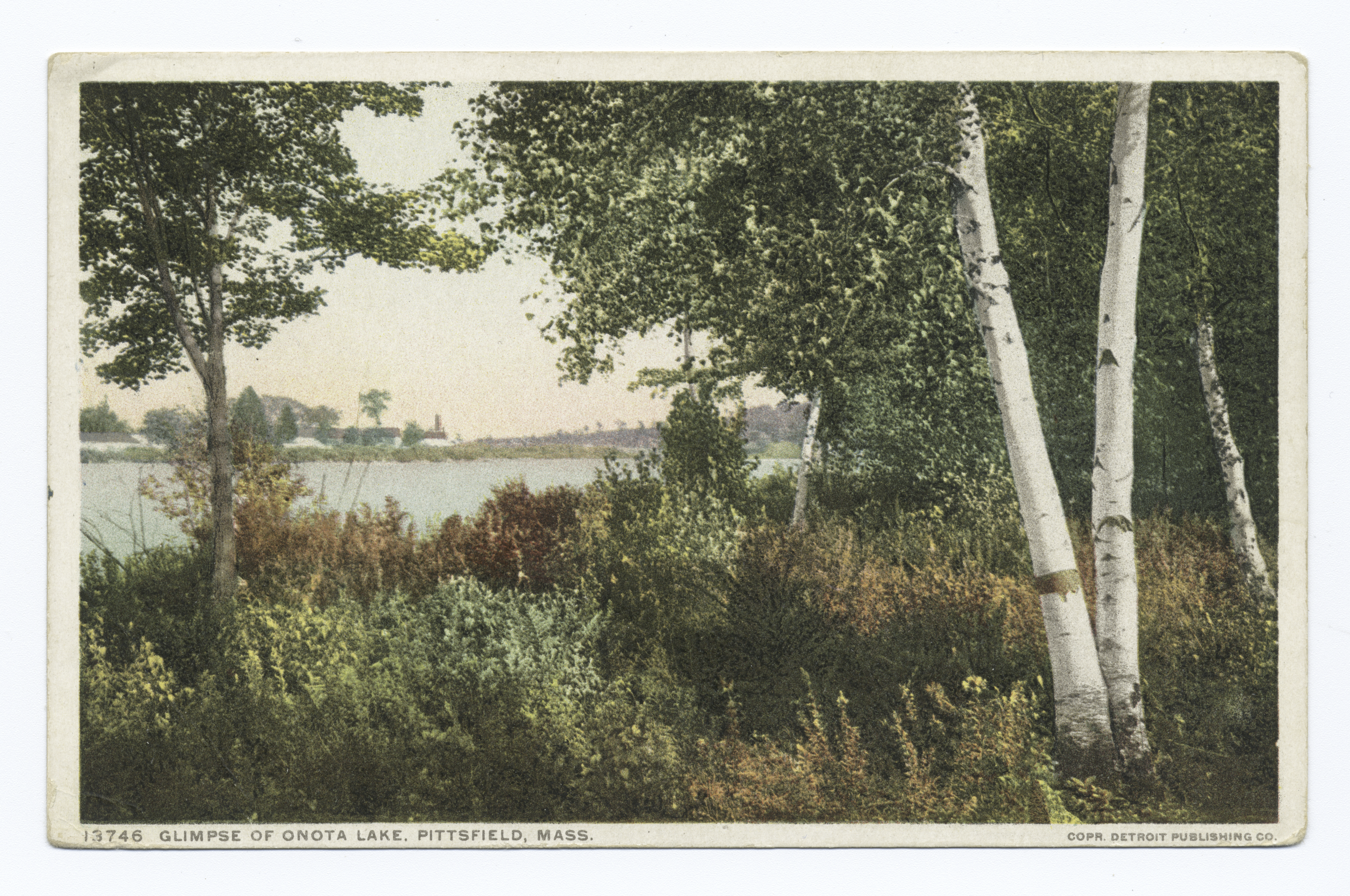

- Location within Massachusetts Location within the United States
- Location: Berkshire County, Massachusetts, U.S.
- Coordinates: 42°28′36″N 73°15′58″W
- Type: Reservoir
- Primary outflows: Onota Brook, Housatonic River
- Catchment area: 6,345 acres (25.68 km^{2})
- Basin countries: United States
- Surface area: 617 acres (250 ha)
- Average depth: 21 ft (6.4 m)
- Max. depth: 72 ft (22 m)
- Surface elevation: 1,076 ft (328 m)
- Dam: Onota Lake Dam
- Settlements: Pittsfield

Onota Lake is located in Pittsfield, Massachusetts. It is 617 acres (2.50 km^{2}) in area, located entirely in the City of Pittsfield and is owned by it. It is divided into north and south basins due to the old roadway that marked to north end with minimal water exchange between them and empties via Onota Brook which flows southeast into the West Branch of the Housatonic River in Pittsfield. The "cottagers" of the late 19th century and early 20th century built large summer mansions along its shores.

Onota Lake is popular for fishing, swimming, water skiing, jet skiing, and sailing. It is home to the famous Pittsfield event "Live on the Lake", a summer concert series consisting of local bands. Camp Winadu is located along its shores. The Williams Ephs men's and women's crews row on the lake.

Fish Populations
Northern Pike	Largemouth Bass	Smallmouth Bass	Brown Trout	Bull Shark
Rainbow Trout (Stocked twice annually)	Chain Pickerel	Yellow Perch	White Perch	
Bluegill	Pumpkinseed	Black Crappie	Rock Bass	
Brown Bullhead	White Sucker	Carp	Golden Shiner	
Common Shiner	Rainbow Smelt	Also a remote possibility of leftover Salmon, which was annually stocked until 2014.		
