= Hancock, Massachusetts =

- Town
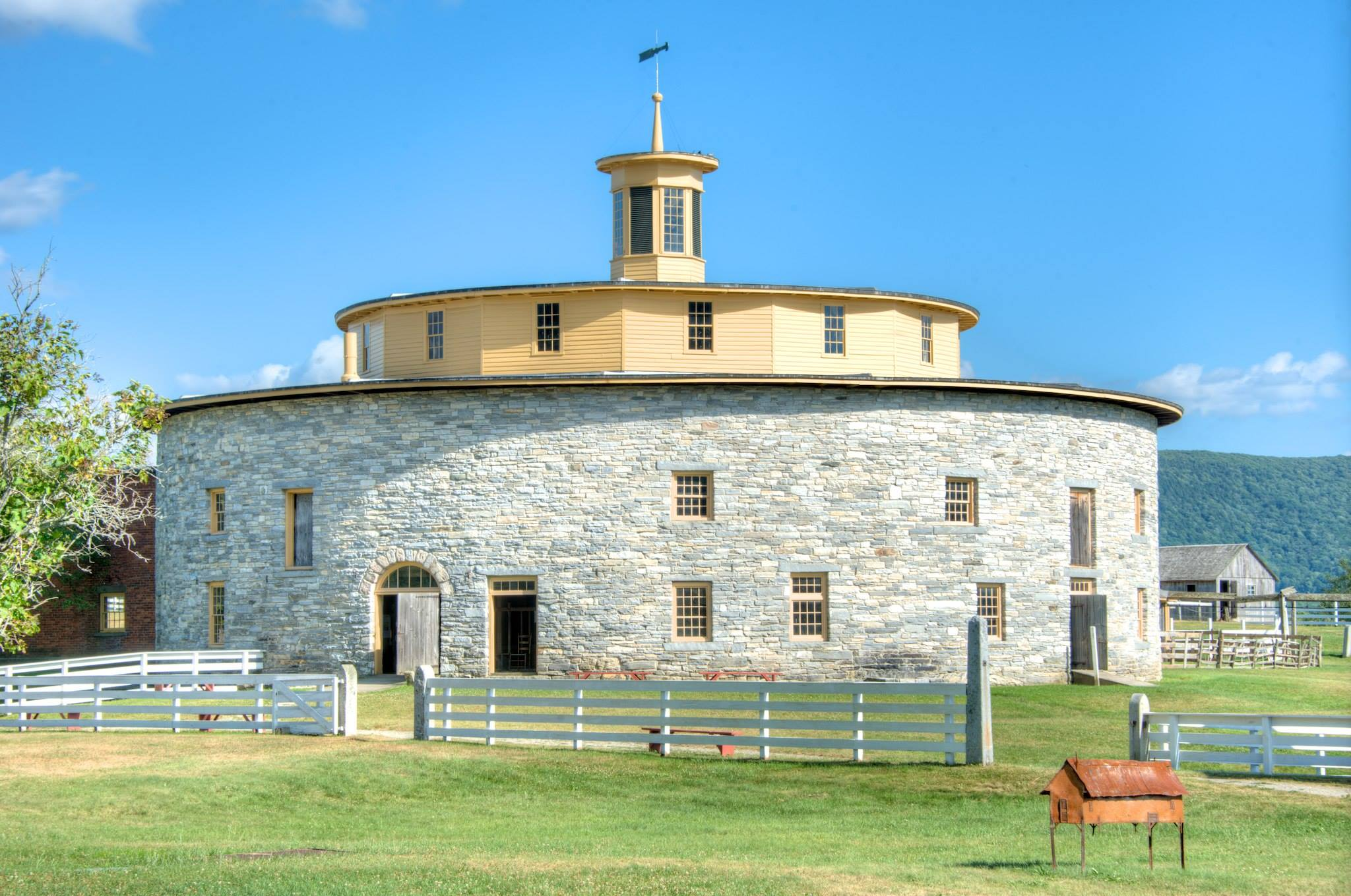
- The Round Barn at Hancock Shaker Village

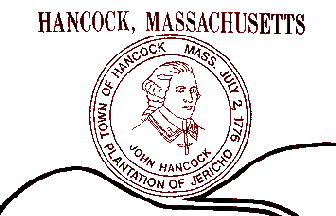
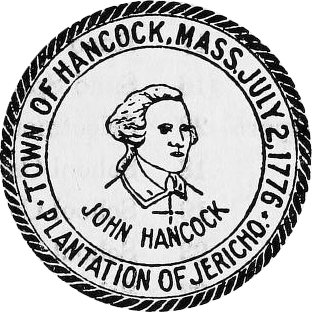
- Flag Seal

- Location in Berkshire County and the state of Massachusetts.
- Coordinates: 42°32′35″N 73°19′27″W
- Country: United States
- State: Massachusetts
- County: Berkshire
- Settled: 1767
- Incorporated: 1776

Government
  - Type: Open town meeting

Area
  - Total: 35.8 sq mi (92.6 km^{2})
  - Land: 35.7 sq mi (92.4 km^{2})
  - Water: 0.077 sq mi (0.2 km^{2})
- Elevation: 1,056 ft (322 m)

Population (2020)
  - Total: 757
  - Density: 21.2/sq mi (8.19/km^{2})
- Time zone: UTC-5 (Eastern)
  - Summer (DST): UTC-4 (Eastern)
- ZIP Codes: 01237 (Lanesborough); 01267 (Williamstown); 01201 (Pittsfield)
- Area code: 413
- FIPS code: 25-28180
- GNIS feature ID: 0619421
- Website: town.hancock.ma.us

Hancock is a town in Berkshire County, Massachusetts, United States. It is part of the Pittsfield, Massachusetts Metropolitan Statistical Area. The population was 757 at the 2020 census.

== History ==
Hancock was first settled in 1762 as the Plantation of Jericho. The town was officially incorporated in 1776, and renamed for John Hancock.

Hancock is one of only three towns in Massachusetts whose local telephone service was not provided by the former Bell System (instead it is part of the Taconic Telephone Corporation, every one of whose other exchanges is situated in neighboring New York). The other two such towns are Richmond, also in Berkshire County, and Granby, in Hampshire County.

=== Hancock Shaker Village ===
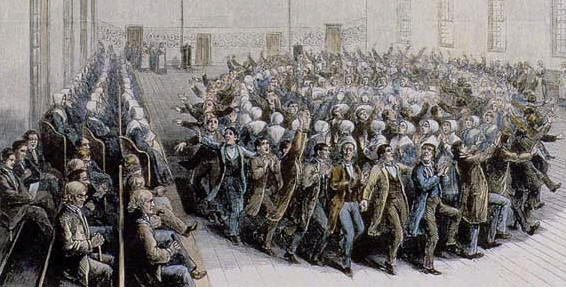
Shaker dance and worship

Around 1780, some families in Hancock converted to the teachings of the Shakers. By 1790, believers in Hancock and Pittsfield established Hancock Shaker Village. The Shakers were a religious order which believed in pacifism, celibacy and communal living. Worship could take the form of singing and ecstatic dance, which is why they were called the "Shaking Quakers", or "Shakers". The utopian sect is renowned today for its plain architecture and furniture. Hancock Shaker Village is famous for its Round Stone Barn, built in 1826. In 1959, the remaining Shakers in Hancock sold the property to a non-profit museum.

== Geography ==
According to the United States Census Bureau, the town has a total area of 35.8 square miles (92.6 km^{2}), of which 35.7 square miles (92.4 km^{2}) is land and 0.077 square miles (0.2 km^{2}), or 0.19%, is water.

Hancock is bordered on the north by Williamstown, on the northeast by New Ashford, on the east by Lanesborough and Pittsfield, on the south by Richmond, and on the west by Canaan, New Lebanon, Stephentown and Berlin, New York.

Most of northern Hancock occupies a valley bound by the Taconic Mountains on each side. The northern half of the valley is drained by the west branch of the Green River, a tributary of the Hoosic River, and the southern half of the valley is drained by the headwaters of Kinderhook Creek, which flows southwest into New York and the Hudson River. To the west, along the New York border, stands the western escarpment of the Taconic Mountains including Misery Mountain and Rounds Mountain, while the northeastern town line is bordered by the eastern Taconic escarpment peaks of Brodie Mountain, Sheeps Heaven Mountain, and Jiminy Peak (home to a ski area of the same name). Southern Hancock, where the Shaker Village is located, is dominated by the Taconic peaks of Pittsfield State Forest, including Tower Mountain, Smith Mountain, Berry Hill, Honwee Mountain, Doll Mountain, and Shaker Mountain. Berry Pond, the highest water body in Massachusetts at over 2,070 feet (630 m) above sea level, sits near the summit of Berry Hill. The highest point in Hancock is a summit of Misery Mountain that reaches 2,671 feet (814 m) above sea level.

U.S. Route 20 passes through the southern end of town, from Pittsfield to the New York state line. Massachusetts Route 43 also passes through town, from the northern border with Williamstown, and is the main route through town, turning along Kinderhook Creek and into New York. There are no roads within the town that connect the two roads, however.

There is no rail, bus or air service within the town. The nearest services are in Pittsfield to the south, and Williamstown and North Adams to the north. The nearest airport with nationally connecting flights is Albany International Airport, approximately 40 miles (64 km) northwest of town.

== Demographics ==
Historical population
Year	Pop.	±%
1790	1,211	—
1850	789	−34.8%
1860	816	+3.4%
1870	882	+8.1%
1880	642	−27.2%
1890	506	−21.2%
1900	451	−10.9%
1910	465	+3.1%
1920	464	−0.2%
1930	361	−22.2%
1940	332	−8.0%
1950	445	+34.0%
1960	455	+2.2%
1970	675	+48.4%
1980	643	−4.7%
1990	628	−2.3%
2000	721	+14.8%
2010	717	−0.6%
2020	757	+5.6%
2024*	740	−2.2%
* = population estimate. Source: United States census records and Population Estimates Program data.

As of the census of 2000, there were 721 people, 296 households, and 209 families residing in the town. Hancock ranks 25th out of the 32 towns in Berkshire County by population, and 335th out of the 351 in Massachusetts. The population density was 20.2 people per square mile (7.8 people/km^{2}), making it the least densely populated town in Berkshire County, and thirteenth-least in the Commonwealth. There were 472 housing units at an average density of 13.2 per square mile (5.1/km^{2}). The racial makeup of the town was 97.36% White, 0.28% African American, 0.55% Asian, 0.14% from other races, and 1.66% from two or more races. Hispanic or Latino of any race were 1.39% of the population.

There were 296 households, out of which 29.7% had children under the age of 18 living with them, 62.2% were married couples living together, 5.4% had a female householder with no husband present, and 29.1% were non-families. 23.3% of all households were made up of individuals, and 7.4% had someone living alone who was 65 years of age or older. The average household size was 2.41 and the average family size was 2.84.

In the town, the population was spread out, with 24.1% under the age of 18, 3.6% from 18 to 24, 29.8% from 25 to 44, 29.7% from 45 to 64, and 12.8% who were 65 years of age or older. The median age was 40 years. For every 100 females, there were 110.8 males. For every 100 females age 18 and over, there were 96.8 males.

The median income for a household in the town was $45,347, and the median income for a family was $50,625. Males had a median income of $35,000 versus $28,750 for females. The per capita income for the town was $22,250. About 6.1% of families and 5.7% of the population were below the poverty line, including 2.4% of those under age 18 and 9.8% of those age 65 or over.

== Government ==
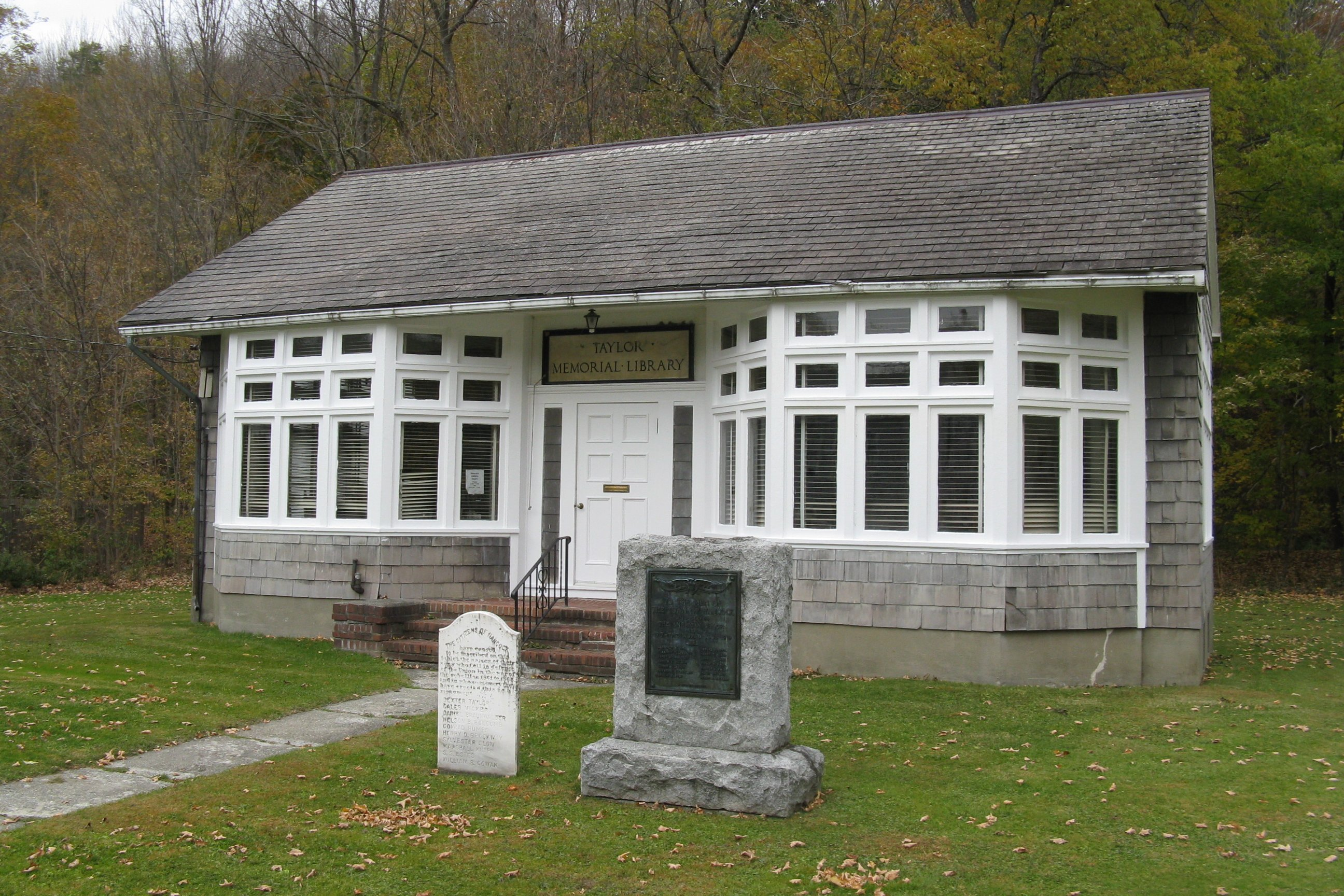
Taylor Memorial Library

Hancock is governed by the open town meeting form of government, and is governed by a board of selectmen. The town has its own volunteer fire department. The town has its own library, Taylor Memorial Library, and other public services.

On the state level, Hancock is represented in the Massachusetts House of Representatives as part of the First Berkshire District, which covers northern and central Berkshire County and has been represented by Gailanne M. Cariddi since January 2013. Prior to the 2010 Massachusetts redistricting of the House and Senate Hancock was in the Second Berkshire District. In the Massachusetts Senate, the town is represented as part of the Berkshire, Hampshire and Franklin district, which includes all of Berkshire County and western Hampshire and Franklin counties, and has been represented by Ben Downing since 2007. The town is patrolled by the Fourth (Cheshire) Station of Troop "B" of the Massachusetts State Police.

On the national level, Hancock is represented in the United States House of Representatives as part of Massachusetts's 1st congressional district, and has been represented by Richard Neal of Springfield since 2013. Massachusetts is currently represented in the United States Senate by senior Senator Elizabeth Warren and junior Senator Ed Markey.

== Education ==
The town has a single school, Hancock Elementary School, which serves students from kindergarten through sixth grade. Upper grades students attend Mount Greylock Regional High School in Williamstown. The nearest private schools are in Williamstown and Pittsfield.

The nearest community college, Berkshire Community College, is in Pittsfield. The nearest state colleges are Westfield State University and Massachusetts College of Liberal Arts in North Adams, and the nearest University of Massachusetts campus is the UMass Amherst. Williams College in Williamstown is the nearest private college.

== See also ==
- Millennial Praises
