= Kinderhook Creek =

Kinderhook Creek East Creek, Kinderhook Brook
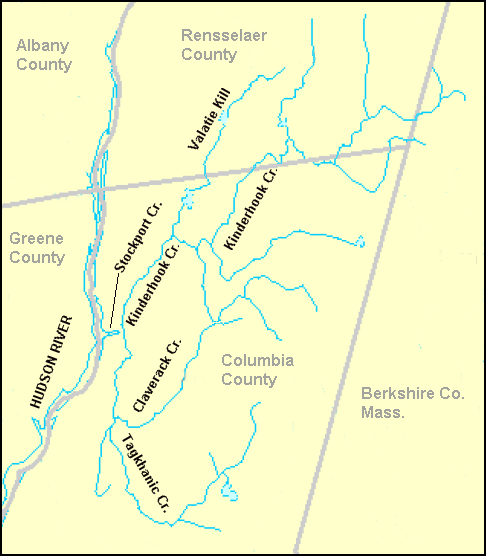
- Main branches of Kinderhook Creek and Claverack Creek
- Native name: Pasanthkack (Mahican)

Location
- Country: United States
- State: New York, Massachusetts
- County: Columbia County, NY, Rensselaer County, NY, Berkshire County, MA
- Towns: , Stottville, New York, Hancock, Massachusetts

Physical characteristics
- Source
  - location: Hancock, Taconic Mountains, Massachusetts
  - coordinates: 42°34′38″N 73°17′52″W
- Mouth: Stockport Creek
  - location: Stockport, New York
  - coordinates: 42°19′03″N 73°44′43″W
  - elevation: 10 ft (3.0 m)
- Length: 49 mi (79 km)

Kinderhook Creek is a 49.0-mile-long (78.9 km) tributary to Stockport Creek, an inlet of the Hudson River in the United States. From its source in Hancock, Massachusetts, the creek runs southwest through the Taconic Mountains into Rensselaer County, New York, and then into Columbia County. It flows through the towns of Stephentown, New Lebanon, Nassau, Chatham, Kinderhook and Stuyvesant to its mouth at Stockport Creek in the town of Stockport.

Kinderhook Creek has a drainage area of over 329 square miles (850 km^{2}).

== History ==
Kinderhook Creek was known as Pasanthkack by the Mahican Native Americans. Prior to 1667 it was known as "Major Abram's (Staats) Kill" and "Third Falls." In 1823 it was called Stuyvesant Falls (now referring to a village on the creek) and after 1845 "Kinderhook Creek".

The name "Kinderhook" has its root in the landing of Henry Hudson in the area around present-day Stuyvesant, where he was greeted by Native Americans with many children. With the Dutch Kinder meaning "child" and Hoeck meaning "bend" or "hook" [in the river], the name literally means "bend in the river where the children are". A figurative translation is "children's point".

The area around Kinderhook Creek was called Machackoesk by the Native American Mahican Tribe.

== Tributaries ==
- Valatie Kill - Native American, Tsat-sa-was-sa or Tack-a-was-ick creek (and lake) are placed in the town of Nassau by the French. The name may refer to a stone mortar.
- Kline Kill - Native American Mahican name Scom-pa-muck or Squampanoc
  - Indian Creek
  - Punsit Creek
- Stony Kill
  - Frisbee Creek
  - Queechy Lake Brook - Mahican name Quis-sich-kook, unknown meaning
- Green Brook
- Tackawasick Creek
  - Cranberry Vly
- Black Brook
  - Huff Brook
- Hollow Brook
- Wyomanock Creek - Native American name for the creek. Also known as Lebanon Creek.
  - South Branch Wyomanock Creek
  - Berry Pond Creek
    - Red Oak Brook
- Taplin Bourn (from Middle English bourne, a brook)
- Black River
- Roaring Brook
- East Brook
  - West Brook
- Bentley Brook
- Whitman Brook
- Jones Brook
- Rathburn Brook

== See also ==
- List of rivers of New York
- List of rivers of Massachusetts
- Kinderhook (town), New York
