= Pittsfield State Forest =

Protected area in Massachusetts, United States

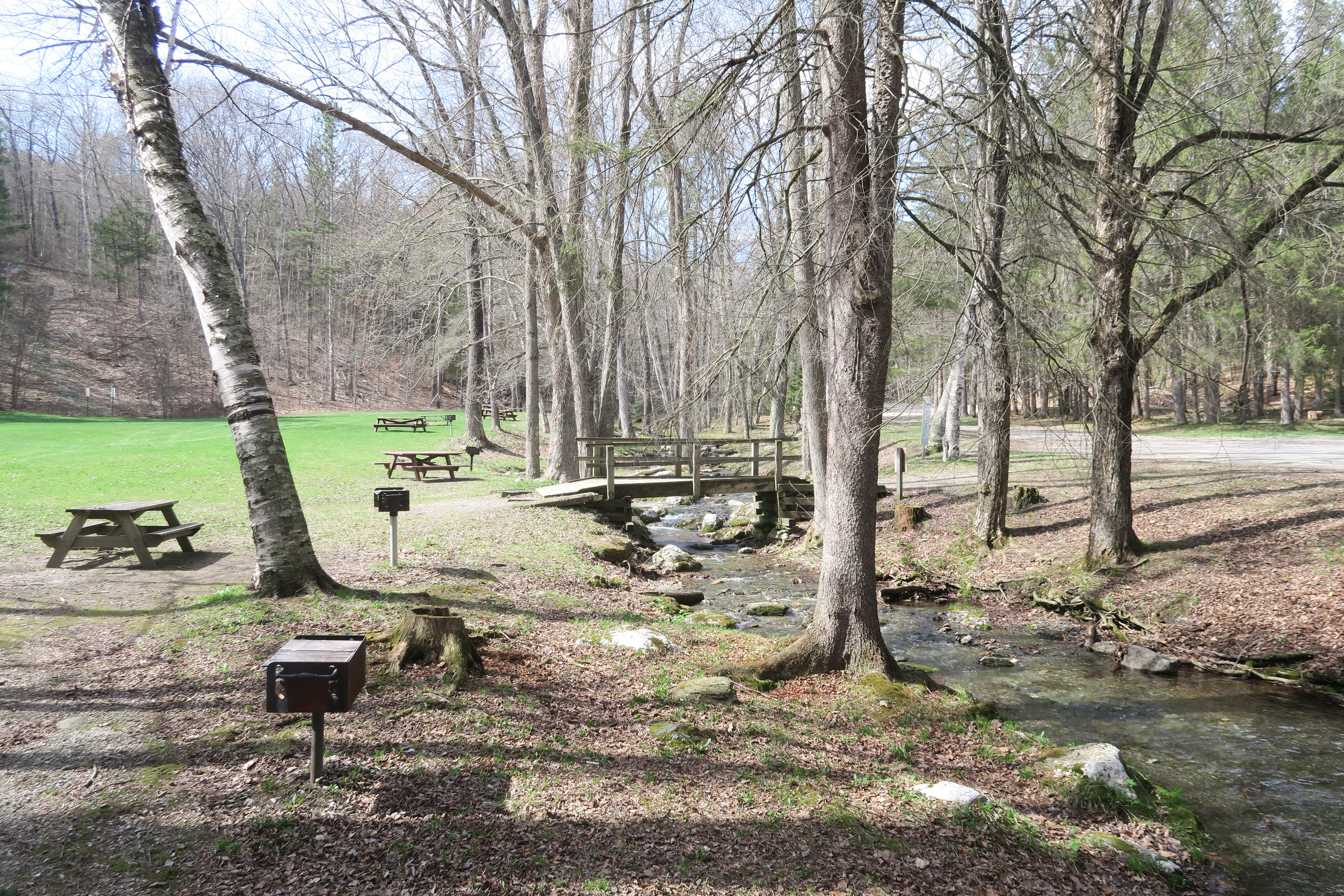
- Lulu Brook

- Location within Massachusetts Location within the United States
- Location: Pittsfield, Massachusetts, United States
- Coordinates: 42°30′08″N 73°18′56″W
- Area: 10,601 acres (4,290 ha)
- Elevation: 2,202 ft (671 m)
- Administrator: Massachusetts Department of Conservation and Recreation
- Website: Official website

Pittsfield State Forest is an 11,000-acre (4,500 ha) Massachusetts state forest located in the town of Pittsfield and managed by the Department of Conservation and Recreation. The forest is the location of Berry Pond, which sitting atop Berry Mountain at an elevation of 2,150 feet (660 m) is the highest natural body of water in the state.

== Activities and amenities ==
- Trails: There are more than 30 miles (48 km) of trails available for hiking, walking, mountain biking, horseback riding, and cross-country skiing. Off-road vehicle usage requires a permit. Trails include the .5-mile (0.80 km), wheelchair-accessible Tranquility Trail as well as access to the 35-mile (56 km) Taconic Crest Trail.
- Camping: There are 32 sites for tents, pop-up, group, and standard non-electric camping.
- The forest also offers non-motorized boating and fishing on Berry Pond and restricted hunting.
