= List of mountains of the Appalachians =

This is a non-exhaustive list of mountains of the Appalachians.

| Name | Sub-range | Type | Administrative location | Highest point | Elevation (meter) | Coordinate location |
|---|---|---|---|---|---|---|
| Adams Mountain | Blue Ridge Mountains | mountain | Caldwell County, North Carolina | | 759 | 35.9311°N 81.7244°W |
| Adstock Mountain | Notre Dame Mountains | mountain | Chaudière-Appalaches, Quebec | | 671 | 46.0292°N 71.2039°W |
| Alander Mountain | Taconic Mountains | mountain | Berkshire County, Massachusetts | | 682 | 42.0881°N 73.5044°W |
| Alcovy Mountain | Appalachian Mountains | mountain | Walton County, Georgia | | 326 | 33.7326°N 83.7446°W |
| Allegheny Mountain | Allegheny Mountains | mountain | West Virginia | | 1,365 | 38.4797°N 79.6936°W |
| Allegheny Mountains | Appalachian Mountains | mountain range | West Virginia | Spruce Knob | 1,482 | 38.6997°N 79.5328°W |
| Anthony's Nose | Hudson Highlands | mountain | Westchester County, New York | | 270 | 41.3195°N 73.9776°W |
| Apple Orchard Mountain | Blue Ridge Mountains | mountain | Botetourt County and Bedford County, Virginia | | 1,287 | 37.5169°N 79.5103°W |
| Arthabaska Mountain | Notre Dame Mountains | mountain | Victoriaville, Quebec | | 305 | 46.0375°N 71.9028°W |
| Ashokan High Point | Catskill Mountains | mountain | Ulster County, New York | | 939 | 41.9248°N 74.2879°W |
| Mount Aylmer | Notre Dame Mountains | mountain | Estrie, Quebec | | 532 | 45.7495°N 71.2958°W |
| Bald Eagle Mountain | Allegheny Mountains | mountain | Pennsylvania | | 612 | 41.1372°N 77.3272°W |
| Bald Mountain | Appalachian Mountains | mountain | Lackawanna County, Pennsylvania | | 695 | 41.4291°N 75.7503°W |
| Bald Mountain | Ramapo Mountains | mountain | Bergen County, New Jersey | | 351 | 41.1209°N 74.2001°W |
| Baldpate Mountain | Longfellow Mountains | mountain | Oxford County, Maine | | 1152 | 44.6092°N 70.8951°W |
| Balsam Cap | Catskill Mountains | mountain | Ulster County, New York | | 1,104 | 41.9770°N 74.3574°W |
| Balsam Lake Mountain | Catskill Mountains | mountain | Ulster County, New York | | 1,137 | 42.0457°N 74.5945°W |
| Balsam Mountain | Catskill Mountains | mountain | Ulster County, New York | | 1,100 | 42.0908°N 74.488°W |
| Bare Mountain | Holyoke Range | mountain | Hampshire County, Massachusetts | | 309 | 42.3037°N 72.5314°W |
| Barn Door Hills | Metacomet Ridge | mountain | Granby, Connecticut | | 177 | 41.9325°N 72.8178°W |
| Barnston Mount | Notre Dame Mountains | mountain | Estrie, Quebec | | 730 | 45.0186°N 71.9281°W |
| Battle Mountain | Blue Ridge Mountains | mountain | Rappahannock County, Virginia | | 354 | 38.6572°N 78.0600°W |
| Beacon Hill | Metacomet Ridge | mountain | Branford, Connecticut | | 40 | 41.2718°N 72.8582°W |
| Beacon Mountain | Hudson Highlands | mountain | Dutchess County, New York | | 467 | 41.4812°N 73.9449°W |
| Bear Mountain | Taconic Mountains | mountain | Salisbury, Connecticut | | 708 | 42.0448°N 73.4548°W |
| Bear Mountain | Hudson Highlands | mountain | Orange County and Rockland County, New York | | 393 | 41.3136°N 74.005°W |
| Bear's Paw | Blue Ridge Mountains | mountain | Watauga County and Avery County, North Carolina | | 1,586 | 36.1536°N 81.8242°W |
| Bearpen Mountain | Catskill Mountains | mountain | Delaware County and Greene County, New York | | 1,103 | 42.2734°N 74.484°W |
| Beartown Mountain | Clinch Mountain | mountain | Russell County, Virginia | | 1,429 | 36.9362°N 81.8865°W |
| Beaucatcher Mountain | Blue Ridge Mountains | mountain | Buncombe County, North Carolina | | 821 | 35.6053°N 82.5381°W |
| Bee Mountain | Blue Ridge Mountains | mountain | Wilkes County, North Carolina | | 898 | 36.0306°N 81.8231°W |
| Beech Mountain | Blue Ridge Mountains | mountain | Avery County and Watauga County, North Carolina | | 1,678 | 36.1839°N 81.8814°W |
| Bellot Mountain | Ramapo Mountains | mountain | Passaic County, New Jersey | | 227 | 41.0993°N 74.2526°W |
| Berlin Mountain | Taconic Mountains | mountain | Rensselaer County, New York, and Berkshire County, Massachusetts | | 859 | 42.6922°N 73.2856°W |
| Berry Hill | Taconic Mountains | mountain | Berkshire County, Massachusetts | | 671 | 42.5094°N 73.318°W |
| Berry Mountain | Taconic Mountains | mountain | Berkshire County, Massachusetts | | 671 | 42.5022°N 73.3153°W |
| Besek Mountain | Metacomet Ridge | mountain | New Haven County and Middlesex County, Connecticut | | 260 | 41.5134°N 72.7459°W |
| Big Bald Mountain | Appalachian Mountains | mountain | New Brunswick | | 672 | 47.195°N 66.4228°W |
| Big Bald Mountain | Blue Ridge Mountains | mountain | Gilmer County, Georgia | | 1,242 | 34.7511°N 84.3208°W |
| Big Indian Mountain | Catskill Mountains | mountain | Ulster County, New York | | 1,128 | 42.0351°N 74.4965°W |
| Big Jay | Green Mountains | mountain | Orleans County and Franklin County, Vermont | | 1,154 | 44.9159°N 72.5404°W |
| Big Level | Long Range Mountains | mountain | Newfoundland and Labrador | | 795 | 49.6894°N 57.7386°W |
| Big Mountain | Allegheny Mountains | mountain | Fulton County and Franklin County, Pennsylvania | | 749 | 39.9504°N 77.9367°W |
| Black Dome | Catskill Mountains | mountain | Greene County, New York | | 1,213 | 42.2701°N 74.1226°W |
| Black Mountain, Nova Scotia | Cape Breton Highlands | mountain | Cape Breton Island, Nova Scotia | | 380 | 46.6275°N 60.939°W |
| Black Mountain | Cumberland Mountains | mountain | Kentucky and Virginia | | 1,263 | 36.9142°N 82.8939°W |
| Blackjack Mountain | Appalachian Mountains | mountain | Carroll County, Georgia | | 471 | 33.4368°N 85.2658°W |
| Blood Mountain | Blue Ridge Mountains | mountain | Union County and Lumpkin County, Georgia | | 1,359 | 34.7397°N 83.9372°W |
| Blue Mountain | Pocono Mountains | mountain | Carbon County, Pennsylvania | | 330 | 40°49′20″N 75°30′48″W |
| Blue Ridge Mountain | Blue Ridge Mountains | mountain | West Virginia and Virginia | | 728 | 39.08167°N 77.8622°W |
| Blue Ridge Mountains | Appalachian Mountains | mountain range | Georgia, North Carolina, South Carolina, Tennessee, and Virginia | Mount Mitchell | 2,037 | 35.7647°N 82.2653°W |
| Bluerock Mountain | Blue Ridge Mountains | mountain | Henderson County and Rutherford County, North Carolina | | 864 | 35.4375°N 82.2781°W |
| Bolton Mountain | Green Mountains | mountain | Chittenden County, Vermont | | 1,122 | 44.4492°N 72.8396°W |
| Bonnet à Amédée | Notre Dame Mountains | mountain | Saint-Fabien-de-Panet, Quebec | | 730 | 46.6581°N 70.2194°W |
| Boott Spur | Presidential Range | mountain | Coos County, New Hampshire | | 1,674 | 44.2522°N 71.295°W |
| Brace Mountain | Taconic Mountains | mountain | Dutchess County, New York | | 704 | 42.0442°N 73.4925°W |
| Bradley Mountain | Metacomet Ridge | mountain | Hartford County, Connecticut | | 207 | 41.6575°N 72.8378°W |
| Brasstown Bald | Blue Ridge Mountains | mountain | Union County, Georgia | | 1,458 | 34.8742°N 83.8107°W |
| Bread Loaf Mountain | Green Mountains | mountain | Addison County, Vermont | | 1,169 | 44.0022°N 72.9413°W |
| Breakneck Ridge | Hudson Highlands | mountain | Putnam County, New York | | 384 | 41.4597°N 73.9589°W |
| Brier Knob | Blue Ridge Mountains | mountain | Avery County, North Carolina | | 1,245 | 36.0811°N 81.8781°W |
| Brodie Mountain | Taconic Mountains | mountain | Berkshire County, Massachusetts | | 799 | 42.5825°N 73.2744°W |
| Brown Mountain | Blue Ridge Mountains | mountain | Caldwell County and Burke County, North Carolina | | 696 | 35.9158°N 81.7458°W |
| Brush Mountain | Allegheny Mountains | mountain | Blair County, Pennsylvania | | 779 | 40.4877°N 78.3522°W |
| Bull Hill | Hudson Highlands | mountain | Putnam County, New York | | 433 | 41.4383°N 73.9556°W |
| Butler Knob | Allegheny Mountains | mountain | Huntingdon County, Pennsylvania | | 707 | 40.2931°N 77.9670°W |
| Buttereau des Pins Rouges | Notre Dame Mountains | mountain | Carleton-sur-Mer, Quebec | | | 48.1472°N 66.1408°W |
| Cadillac Mountain | Appalachian Mountains | mountain | Hancock County, Maine | | 465 | 44.3527°N 68.32251°W |
| Caledonian Highland | Appalachian Mountains | hill | New Brunswick | | 416 | 45.752°N 64.69°W |
| Camel's Hump | Green Mountains | mountain | Chittenden County, Vermont | | 1,244 | 44.3195°N 72.8863°W |
| Camelback Mountain | Pocono Mountains | mountain | Monroe County, Pennsylvania | | 650 | 41.0419°N 75.3458°W |
| Cannon Mountain | White Mountains | mountain | Grafton County, New Hampshire | | 1,244 | 44.1565°N 71.6984°W |
| Canoe Mountain | Allegheny Mountains | mountain | Blair County and Huntingdon County, Pennsylvania | | 664 | 40.5417°N 78.2083°W |
| Cape Breton Highlands | Appalachian Mountains | mountain range | Nova Scotia | White Hill | 535 | 46.7499°N 60.5983°W |
| Caribou Mountain | Longfellow Mountains | mountain | Franklin County, Maine, and Saint-Augustin-de-Woburn, Quebec | | 1,110 | 45.4297°N 70.6231°W |
| Cathole Mountain | Hanging Hills | mountain | Meriden, Connecticut | | 157 | 41.5758°N 72.8006°W |
| Catoctin Mountain | Blue Ridge Mountains | mountain | Frederick County, Maryland | | 580 | 39.6478°N 77.4664°W |
| Catskill Mountains | Appalachian Mountains | mountain range | New York | Slide Mountain | 1,274 | 41.9986°N 74.3864°W |
| Champlain Peak | Notre Dame Mountains | summit | Bas-Saint-Laurent, Quebec | | 346 | 48.3283°N 68.8353°W |
| Chauncey Peak | Metacomet Ridge | mountain | Meriden, Connecticut | | 210 | 41.5586°N 72.7594°W |
| Cheaha Mountain | Blue Ridge Mountains | mountain | Cleburne County, Alabama | | 735 | 33.4855°N 85.8087°W |
| Chestnut Mountain | Blue Ridge Mountains | mountain | Caldwell County, North Carolina | | 1,010 | 35.9617°N 81.8069°W |
| Chic-Choc Mountains | Notre Dame Mountains | mountain range | Bas-Saint-Laurent and Gaspésie–Îles-de-la-Madeleine, Quebec | Mont Jacques-Cartier | 1,270 | 48.92°N 66°W |
| Chilhowee Mountain | Great Smoky Mountains | mountain | Blount County and Sevier County, Tennessee | | 867 | 35.7305°N 83.8199°W |
| Chimney Tops | Great Smoky Mountains | mountain | Sevier County, Tennessee | | 1,440 | 35.6293°N 83.4763°W |
| Mount Chocolat | Massif du Sud | mountain | Chaudière-Appalaches, Quebec | | 854 | 46.6316°N 70.4239°W |
| Christmas Mountains | Appalachian Mountains | mountain | Northumberland County, New Brunswick | | 750 | 47.16033°N 66.71607°W |
| Clinch Mountain | Appalachian Mountains | ridge | Tennessee | | 1,429 | 36.4333°N 82.9667°W |
| Colonels Mountain | Appalachian Mountains | mountain | New Brunswick | | 600 | 47.2036°N 66.3972°W |
| Colvin Mountain | Appalachian Mountains | mountain | Etowah County and Calhoun County, Alabama | | 282 | 33.9486°N 85.8086°W |
| Coolidge Range | Green Mountains | mountain range | Rutland County and Windsor County, Vermont | Killington Peak | 1,291 | 43.5903°N 72.8248°W |
| Coosa Bald | Blue Ridge Mountains | mountain | Union County, Georgia | | 1,305 | 34.7786°N 83.9633°W |
| Cowrock Mountain | Blue Ridge Mountains | mountain | Georgia | | 1,174 | 34.7217°N 83.8567°W |
| Crocker Mountain (Maine) | Longfellow Mountains | mountain | Franklin County, Maine | | 1,289 | 45.0471°N 70.3822°W |
| Cross Mountain | Bear Pond Mountains | mountain | Franklin County, Pennsylvania | | 628 | 39.7283°N 77.9918°W |
| Crossing Knob | Blue Ridge Mountains | mountain | Watauga County, North Carolina | | 1,018 | 36.2619°N 81.8656°W |
| Crow's Nest | Hudson Highlands | mountain | Orange County, New York | | 429 | 41.4087°N 73.9839°W |
| Crum Hill | The Berkshires | mountain | Franklin County, Massachusetts | | 866 | 42.7111°N 73.0197°W |
| Cumberland Mountains | Appalachian Mountains | mountain range | Kentucky, Tennessee, Virginia, and West Virginia | High Knob | 1,287 | 36.6°N 83.67°W |
| Currahee Mountain | Blue Ridge Mountains | mountain | Stephens County, Georgia | | 529 | 34.5292°N 83.3759°W |
| Dans Mountain | Allegheny Mountains | mountain | Allegany County, Maryland | | 882 | 39.5818°N 78.8972°W |
| Devil's Courthouse | Blue Ridge Mountains | mountain | Transylvania County, North Carolina | | 1,743 | 35.3025°N 82.8956°W |
| Dick's Knob | Blue Ridge Mountains | mountain | Rabun County, Georgia | | 1,408 | 34.9856°N 83.5217°W |
| Doll Mountain | Taconic Mountains | mountain | Berkshire County, Massachusetts | | 588 | 42.4596°N 73.3456°W |
| Dorset Mountain | Taconic Mountains | mountain | Rutland County and Bennington County, Vermont | | 1,146 | 43.3092°N 73.0282°W |
| Double Spring Knob | Blue Ridge Mountains | mountain | Towns County and Rabun County, Georgia | | 1,305 | 34.8783°N 83.6567°W |
| Doubletop Mountain | Appalachian Mountains | mountain | Piscataquis County, Maine | | 1,063 | 45.9359°N 69.0612°W |
| Doubletop Mountain | Catskill Mountains | mountain | Ulster County, New York | | 1,177 | 42.0276°N 74.5282°W |
| Drag Hill | Ramapo Mountains | mountain | Bergen County, New Jersey | | 323 | 41.0982°N 74.2093°W |
| Dunderberg Mountain | Hudson Highlands | mountain | Rockland County, New York | | 331 | 41.2856°N 73.9863°W |
| Eagle Mountain | Catskill Mountains | mountain | Ulster County, New York | | 1,100 | 42.0618°N 74.5093°W |
| Eaglenest Mountain | Plott Balsams | mountain | Haywood County, North Carolina | | 1,501 | 35.4961°N 83.0431°W |
| East Mountain | Metacomet Ridge | mountain | Hampden County, Massachusetts | | 237 | 42.2031°N 72.6603°W |
| East Peak | Hanging Hills | mountain | Meriden, Connecticut | | 297 | 41.5575°N 72.8372°W |
| East Peak Mount Osceola | White Mountains | mountain | Grafton County, New Hampshire | | 1,267 | 44.0062°N 71.5206°W |
| East Rock | Metacomet Ridge | mountain | New Haven County, Connecticut | | 112 | 41.3272°N 72.9047°W |
| Elk Hill | Allegheny Plateau | mountain | Susquehanna County, Pennsylvania | | 821 | 41.7150°N 75.5620°W |
| Elk Knob | Blue Ridge Mountains | mountain | Watauga County, North Carolina | | 1,688 | 36.3272°N 81.6767°W |
| Elk Pond Mountain | Blue Ridge Mountains | mountain | Rockbridge County and Nelson County, Virginia | | 1,230 | 37.8127°N 79.1647°W |
| Elk Ridge | Blue Ridge Mountains | mountain | Washington County, Maryland | | 450 | 39.3869°N 77.6896°W |
| Equinox Mountain | Taconic Mountains | mountain | Bennington County, Vermont | | 1,163 | 43.1704°N 73.1112°W |
| Farmington Mountain | Metacomet Ridge | mountain | Farmington, Connecticut | | 153 | 41.7134°N 72.8157°W |
| Fir Mountain | Catskill Mountains | mountain | Ulster County, New York | | 1,103 | 42.0276°N 74.469°W |
| Fire Scale Mountain | Blue Ridge Mountains | mountain | Watauga County, North Carolina | | 1,172 | 36.2331°N 81.4917°W |
| Flattop Mountain | Blue Ridge Mountains | mountain | Avery County, North Carolina | | 1,507 | 36.115°N 81.8617°W |
| Forkston Mountain | Endless Mountains | mountain | Wyoming County, Pennsylvania | | 722 | 41.5120°N 76.0717°W |
| Fowler Mountain | Metacomet Ridge | mountain | Wallingford, Connecticut | | 230 | 41.4442°N 72.7403°W |
| Franconia Range | White Mountains | mountain range | Grafton County, New Hampshire | Mount Lafayette | 1,600 | 44.1608°N 71.6447°W |
| Franey Mountain | Cape Breton Highlands | mountain | Nova Scotia | | 430 | 46.6792°N 60.4919°W |
| Friday Mountain | Catskill Mountains | mountain | Ulster County, New York | | 1,126 | 41.9876°N 74.3621°W |
| Frozen Head | Cumberland Mountains | mountain | Morgan County, Tennessee | | 1,013 | 36.1225°N 84.4578°W |
| Furnace Mountain | Blue Ridge Mountains | mountain | Loudoun County, Virginia | | 272 | 39.2645°N 77.5536°W |
| Glastenbury Mountain | Green Mountains | mountain | Bennington County, Vermont | | 1,142 | 42.9781°N 73.0712°W |
| Glen Mountain | Sutton Mountains | mountain | Estrie, Quebec | | 645 | 45.196°N 72.405°W |
| Goose Eye Mountain | Mahoosuc Range | mountain | Oxford County, Maine | | 1,177 | 44.5026°N 70.9915°W |
| Graham Mountain | Catskill Mountains | mountain | Ulster County, New York | | 1,179 | 42.0393°N 74.5496°W |
| Grandfather Mountain | Blue Ridge Mountains | mountain | North Carolina | | 1,818 | 36.1111°N 81.8114°W |
| Grandmother Mountain | Blue Ridge Mountains | mountain | Avery County, North Carolina | | 1,403 | 36.0597°N 81.8425°W |
| Grass Mountain | Taconic Mountains | mountain | Bennington County, Vermont | | 948 | 43.0529°N 73.2234°W |
| Grays Island | Caledonian Highland | mountain | New Brunswick | | 25 | 45.9364°N 64.645°W |
| Great Smoky Mountains | Blue Ridge Mountains | mountain range | North Carolina and Tennessee | Kuwohi | 2,025 | 35.5628°N 83.4986°W |
| Green Mountains | Appalachian Mountains | mountain range | Vermont and Quebec | Mount Mansfield | 1,339 | 44.7917°N 72.5828°W |
| Gregory Bald | Great Smoky Mountains | mountain | Blount County, Tennessee, and Swain County, North Carolina | | 1,508 | 35.5206°N 83.8661°W |
| Gridley Mountain | Taconic Mountains | mountain | Litchfield County, Connecticut | | 674 | 42.0391°N 73.4670°W |
| Gros Morne | Long Range Mountains | mountain | Newfoundland and Labrador | | 807 | 49.5936°N 57.7836°W |
| Gunters Mountain | Cumberland Plateau | mountain | Marshall County, Alabama | | 421 | 34.5662°N 86.1775°W |
| Halcott Mountain | Catskill Mountains | mountain | Greene County, New York | | 1,073 | 42.1801°N 74.4379°W |
| Hanging Hills | Metacomet Ridge | mountain | Hartford County and New Haven County, Connecticut | West Peak | 312 | 41.5572°N 72.8367°W |
| Hatchett Hill | Metacomet Ridge | mountain | East Granby, Connecticut | | 155 | 41.9281°N 72.7475°W |
| Hawksbill Mountain | Blue Ridge Mountains | mountain | Page County and Madison County, Virginia | | 1,234 | 38.5553°N 78.3953°W |
| Haystack Mountain | Allegheny Mountains | mountain | Allegany County, Maryland | | 520 | 39.6301°N 78.8206°W |
| Haystack Mountain | Green Mountains | mountain | Windham County, Vermont | | 1,050 | 42.914°N 72.9195°W |
| Herman Point | Allegheny Mountains | mountain | Bedford County, Pennsylvania | | 925 | 40.2959°N 78.5737°W |
| Higby Mountain | Metacomet Ridge | mountain | Middlesex County, Connecticut | | 272 | 41.5440°N 72.7423°W |
| High Knob | Cumberland Mountains | mountain | Wise County, Virginia | | 1,287 | 36.8926°N 82.6296°W |
| High Knob | Blue Ridge Mountains | mountain | Warren County and Fauquier County, Virginia | | 728 | 38.8833°N 78.1167°W |
| High Mountain | Ramapo Mountains | mountain | Bergen County and Passaic County, New Jersey | | 337 | 41.0887°N 74.2351°W |
| Hightower Bald | Blue Ridge Mountains | mountain | Towns County, Georgia | | 1,392 | 34.9847°N 83.6203°W |
| Hogback Mountain | Blue Ridge Mountains | mountain | Loudoun County, Virginia | | 204 | 39.0959°N 77.6072°W |
| Hogback Mountain | Green Mountains | mountain | Windham County, Vermont | | 735 | 42.867°N 72.7876°W |
| Holston Mountain | Blue Ridge Mountains | mountain | Tennessee | | 1,305 | 36.4333°N 82.1333°W |
| Holy Mount | Taconic Mountains | mountain | Berkshire County, Massachusetts | | 600 | 42.451°N 73.3536°W |
| Holyoke Range | Metacomet Ridge | mountain | Hampshire County, Massachusetts | Mount Norwottuck | 337 | 42.3042°N 72.5389°W |
| Honwee Mountain | Taconic Mountains | mountain | Berkshire County, Massachusetts | | 705 | 42.5108°N 73.3066°W |
| Hoosac Range | The Berkshires | mountain | Berkshire County, Massachusetts, and Bennington County, Vermont | | 914 | 42.7578°N 73.0261°W |
| Houvenkopf Mountain | Ramapo Mountains | mountain | Bergen County, New Jersey | | 284 | 41.1059°N 74.1751°W |
| Howard Knob | Blue Ridge Mountains | mountain | Watauga County, North Carolina | | 1,340 | 36.2308°N 81.6761°W |
| Humpback Mountain | Blue Ridge Mountains | mountain | Avery County and McDowell County, North Carolina | | 1,294 | 35.9444°N 81.9617°W |
| Humpback Rock | Blue Ridge Mountains | mountain | Augusta County and Nelson County, Virginia | | 939 | 37.9608°N 78.9003°W |
| Hunter Mountain | Catskill Mountains | mountain | Greene County, New York | | 1,231 | 42.1779°N 74.2304°W |
| Jacks Mountain | Allegheny Mountains | mountain | Pennsylvania | | 707 | 40.6286°N 77.6314°W |
| Jay Peak | Green Mountains | mountain | Orleans County, Vermont | | 1,176 | 44.9242°N 72.5256°W |
| Jo-Mary Mountain | Appalachian Mountains | mountain | Piscataquis County, Maine | | 885 | 45.6181°N 69.0620°W |
| Kaaterskill High Peak | Catskill Escarpment | mountain | Greene County, New York | | 1,114 | 42.1622°N 74.0801°W |
| Kennesaw Mountain | Appalachian Mountains | mountain | Cobb County, Georgia | | 551 | 33.9762°N 84.5797°W |
| Killington Peak | Coolidge Range | mountain | Rutland County, Vermont | | 1,289 | 43.6044°N 72.8206°W |
| Kinton Knob | Allegheny Mountains | mountain | Bedford County, Pennsylvania | | 774 | 40.013°N 78.5543°W |
| Kitty Ann Mountain | Ramapo Mountains | mountain | Kinnelon, New Jersey | | 353 | 41.0087223°N 74.4162058°W |
| Knob Mountain | Blue Ridge Mountains | mountain | Page County, Virginia | | 814 | 38.7344°N 78.3447°W |
| Lambs Knoll | South Mountain | mountain | Frederick County and Washington County, Maryland | | 536 | 39.4486°N 77.6275°W |
| Lamentation Mountain | Metacomet Ridge | mountain | Connecticut | | 219 | 41.5742°N 72.7625°W |
| Laurel Hill | Allegheny Mountains | mountain | Pennsylvania | | 913 | 40.1608°N 79.1644°W |
| Laurel Mountain | Allegheny Mountains | mountain | West Virginia | | 962 | 39.1422°N 79.8333°W |
| Levelland Mountain | Blue Ridge Mountains | mountain | Union County and Lumpkin County, Georgia | | 1,183 | 34.7309°N 83.8985°W |
| Lincoln Peak | Green Mountains | mountain | Washington County and Addison County, Vermont | | 1,212 | 44.1273°N 72.9285°W |
| Little Chestnut Mountain | Blue Ridge Mountains | mountain | Burke County and Caldwell County, North Carolina | | 756 | 35.9408°N 81.7767°W |
| Little Haystack Mountain | Franconia Range | mountain | Grafton County, New Hampshire | | 1,451 | 44.1406°N 71.6448°W |
| Little Mountain | Cumberland Plateau | mountain | Bledsoe County, Tennessee | | 630 | 35.5701°N 85.2808°W |
| Lone Mountain | Catskill Mountains | mountain | Ulster County, New York | | 1,134 | 41.9693°N 74.3893°W |
| Long Mountain | Holyoke Range | mountain | Hampshire County, Massachusetts | | 280 | 42.305°N 72.4831°W |
| Long Range Mountains | Appalachian Mountains | mountain range | Newfoundland and Labrador | The Cabox | 814 | 49.33°N 57.8°W |
| Longfellow Mountains | Appalachian Mountains | mountain range | Maine | Sugarloaf Mountain | 1,291 | 45.0314°N 70.3131°W |
| Looking Glass Rock | Blue Ridge Mountains | mountain | Transylvania County, North Carolina | | 1,210 | 35.3037°N 82.7935°W |
| Lookout Mountain | Cumberland Plateau | mountain | Alabama, Georgia, and Tennessee | | 729 | 34.8637°N 85.3925°W |
| Loon Mountain | White Mountains | mountain | Grafton County, New Hampshire | | 934 | 44.0361°N 71.6217°W |
| Loudoun Heights | Blue Ridge Mountains | mountain | Loudoun County, Virginia, and Jefferson County, West Virginia | | 358 | 39.3078°N 77.7386°W |
| Mahoosuc Range | White Mountains | mountain | Oxford County, Maine, and Coos County, New Hampshire | Old Speck Mountain | 1,270 | 44.50°N 71.00°W |
| Maintop Mountain | Blue Ridge Mountains | mountain | Nelson County, Virginia | | 1,235 | 37.8308°N 79.1222°W |
| Manitook Mountain | Metacomet Ridge | mountain | Hartford County, Connecticut | | 194 | 41.995°N 72.7758°W |
| Marble Mountain | Notre Dame Mountains | mountain | Estrie, Quebec, and Oxford County, Maine | | 915 | 45.3342°N 71.0128°W |
| Mars Hill | Appalachian Mountains | mountain | Aroostook County, Maine | | 533 | 46.5211°N 67.8136°W |
| Martin Hill | Allegheny Mountains | mountain | Bedford County, Pennsylvania | | 846 | 39.8479°N 78.5592°W |
| Mary's Rock | Blue Ridge Mountains | mountain | Page County and Rappahannock County, Virginia | | 1,071 | 38.6503°N 78.3178°W |
| Massif du Sud | Notre Dame Mountains | mountain range | Chaudière-Appalaches, Quebec | Mont du Midi | 916 | 46.6079°N 70.4507°W |
| McGerrigle Mountains | Chic-Choc Mountains | mountain range | Gaspésie–Îles-de-la-Madeleine, Quebec | Mont Jacques-Cartier | 1,268 | 48.9264°N 65.9569°W |
| Mendon Peak | Green Mountains | mountain | Rutland County, Vermont | | 1,170 | 43.5951°N 72.8462°W |
| Merrill Mountain | Notre Dame Mountains | mountain | Le Granit, Quebec, and Franklin County, Maine | | | 45.47417°N 70.69222°W |
| Metacomet Ridge | Appalachian Mountains | mountain | Massachusetts and Connecticut | Mount Toby | 387 | 42.4833°N 72.5333°W |
| Miller Mountain | Endless Mountains | mountain | Wyoming County, Pennsylvania | | 675 | 41.489°N 75.9522°W |
| Misery Mountain | Taconic Mountains | mountain | Rensselaer County, New York, and Berkshire County, Massachusetts | | 814 | 42.6144°N 73.3111°W |
| Mont Bellevue | Notre Dame Mountains | mountain | Estrie, Quebec | | 333 | 45.3803°N 71.9142°W |
| Mount Blanc, Gaspé Peninsula | Chic-Choc Mountains | mountain | Bas-Saint-Laurent, Quebec | | 1,063 | 48.777°N 66.883°W |
| Mount Carleton | Chic-Choc Mountains | mountain | Gaspésie–Îles-de-la-Madeleine, Quebec | | 820 | 48.1658°N 66.1022°W |
| Mount Chauve | Sutton Mountains | mountain | Estrie, Quebec | | 599 | 45.3706°N 72.2111°W |
| Mont Chipoudy | Caledonian Highlands | mountain | Albert County, New Brunswick | | 327 | 45.7972°N 64.6389°W |
| Mount Cliche | Notre Dame Mountains | mountain | Estrie, Quebec | | 693 | 45.5239°N 70.8028°W |
| Mount Comi | Notre Dame Mountains | mountain | Bas-Saint-Laurent, Quebec | | 573 | 48.4661°N 68.2111°W |
| Mont Comte | McGerrigle Mountains | mountain | Gaspésie–Îles-de-la-Madeleine, Quebec | | 1,229 | 48.9778°N 65.9647°W |
| Mont D'Urban | Notre Dame Mountains | mountain | Estrie, Quebec, and Coös County, New Hampshire | | 910 | 45.2969°N 71.1028°W |
| Mont de la Passe | McGerrigle Mountains | mountain | Gaspésie–Îles-de-la-Madeleine, Quebec | | 1,231 | 49.0097°N 65.9483°W |
| Mont de la Table | McGerrigle Mountains | mountain | Gaspésie–Îles-de-la-Madeleine, Quebec | | 1,180 | 48.9856°N 66.0053°W |
| Mont Dos de Baleine | McGerrigle Mountains | mountain | Gaspésie–Îles-de-la-Madeleine, Quebec | | 1,249 | 48.9964°N 65.9394°W |
| Mont Dostie | Notre Dame Mountains | mountain | Estrie, Quebec | | 610 | 45.6267°N 70.7078°W |
| Mont du Midi | Massif du Sud | mountain | Chaudière-Appalaches, Quebec | | 916 | 46.6033°N 70.4939°W |
| Mont Écho | Sutton Mountains | mountain | Estrie, Quebec | | 811 | 45.0965°N 72.5035°W |
| Mont Farlagne | Notre Dame Mountains | mountain | Madawaska County, New Brunswick | | 430 | 47.4014°N 68.3908°W |
| Mont Fernald | Chic-Choc Mountains | mountain | Gaspésie–Îles-de-la-Madeleine, Quebec | | 1,066 | 48.9344°N 65.9908°W |
| Mont Flat Top | Notre Dame Mountains | mountain | Estrie, Quebec | | | 45.4853°N 70.7283°W |
| Mont Foster | Sutton Mountains | mountain | Estrie, Quebec | | 701 | 45.23°N 72.398°W |
| Mont Gagnon | Sutton Mountains | mountain | Estrie, Quebec | | 853 | 45.0925°N 72.5272°W |
| Mont Ham | Notre Dame Mountains | mountain | Estrie, Quebec | | 713 | 45.7909°N 71.6363°W |
| Mont Jacques-Cartier | McGerrigle Mountains | mountain | Gaspésie–Îles-de-la-Madeleine, Quebec | | 1,270 | 48.9906°N 65.9425°W |
| Mount Joseph-Fortin | McGerrigle Mountains | mountain | Gaspésie–Îles-de-la-Madeleine, Quebec | | 1,080 | 48.9467°N 66.0194°W |
| Mont Les cônes | McGerrigle Mountains | mountain | Gaspésie–Îles-de-la-Madeleine, Quebec | | 1,200 | 48.9489°N 65.9422°W |
| Mont Logan | Chic-Choc Mountains | mountain | Bas-Saint-Laurent, Quebec | | 1,150 | 48.8939°N 66.6458°W |
| Mont Louise | Notre Dame Mountains | mountain | Estrie, Quebec, and Franklin County, Maine | | 755 | 45.4312°N 70.7812°W |
| Mont McWhirter | Chic-Choc Mountains | mountain | Gaspésie–Îles-de-la-Madeleine, Quebec | | 1,036 | 48.9142°N 65.9461°W |
| Mont Oak | Notre Dame Mountains | mountain | Chaudière-Appalaches, Quebec | | | 45.9904°N 71.3724°W |
| Mont Orford | Sutton Mountains | mountain | Estrie, Quebec | | 853 | 45.3122°N 72.2419°W |
| Mont Richardson | McGerrigle Mountains | mountain | Gaspésie–Îles-de-la-Madeleine, Quebec | | 1,180 | 48.928°N 66.0167°W |
| Mont Rolland-Germain | McGerrigle Mountains | mountain | Gaspésie–Îles-de-la-Madeleine, Quebec | | 1,202 | 49.0208°N 65.9547°W |
| Mont Round Top | Notre Dame Mountains | mountain | Estrie, Quebec | | 700 | 45.5933°N 70.68°W |
| Mont Saint-Magloire | Massif du Sud | mountain | Chaudière-Appalaches, Quebec | | 861 | 46.6067°N 70.4178°W |
| Mont Saint-Michel | Notre Dame Mountains | mountain | Centre-du-Québec, Quebec | | 345 | 46.0544°N 71.8881°W |
| Mont Sainte-Anne, Gaspésie | Chic-Choc Mountains | mountain | Gaspésie–Îles-de-la-Madeleine, Quebec | | 340 | 48.5214°N 64.2397°W |
| Mont Sainte-Cécile | Notre Dame Mountains | mountain | Estrie, Quebec | | 887 | 45.6978°N 70.9628°W |
| Mont Scotch | Notre Dame Mountains | mountain | Estrie, Quebec | | 680 | 45.3845°N 70.9129°W |
| Mont Scotch Cap | Notre Dame Mountains | mountain | Estrie, Quebec | | 560 | 45.4144°N 70.892°W |
| Mont Sugar Loaf | Notre Dame Mountains | mountain | Chaudière-Appalaches, Quebec | | 650 | 46.7422°N 70.1006°W |
| Mont Tom | Appalachian Mountains | mountain | Annapolis County, Nova Scotia | | 180 | 44.347°N 65.3096°W |
| Mont Xalibu | McGerrigle Mountains | mountain | Gaspésie–Îles-de-la-Madeleine, Quebec | | 1,120 | 48.9636°N 66.0136°W |
| Montage Mountain | Pocono Mountains | mountain | Lackawanna County, Pennsylvania | | 600 | 41.3533°N 75.6592°W |
| Montagne aux Érables | Notre Dame Mountains | mountain | Chaudière-Appalaches, Quebec | | 455 | 46.8411°N 70.3914°W |
| Montagne de l'Ours, Estrie | Notre Dame Mountains | mountain | Estrie, Quebec | | 830 | 45.3681°N 71.0225°W |
| Montagne de l'Ours | Chic-Choc Mountains | mountain | Gaspésie–Îles-de-la-Madeleine, Quebec | | | 49.1353°N 66.4203°W |
| Montagne du Fourneau | Notre Dame Mountains | mountain | Saint-Michel-du-Squatec, Quebec | | 370 | 47.70944°N 68.86833°W |
| Montagne du Porc-Épic (Audet) | Notre Dame Mountains | mountain | Le Granit, Quebec | | 713 | 45.6044°N 70.6606°W |
| Montagne Fendue | Notre Dame Mountains | mountain | Montmagny, Quebec | | 520 | 46.7131°N 70.1531°W |
| Monument Mountain | The Berkshires | mountain | Berkshire County, Massachusetts | | 530 | 42.2581°N 73.3499°W |
| Moose Hill | Notre Dame Mountains | mountain | Estrie, Quebec, and Franklin County, Maine | | 865 | 45.5019°N 70.7144°W |
| Mooseleuk Mountain | Appalachian Mountains | mountain | Piscataquis County, Maine | | 746 | 46.4625°N 68.9033°W |
| Morne de Saint-Sébastien | Notre Dame Mountains | mountain | Estrie, Quebec | | 820 | 45.7631°N 70.9197°W |
| Mount Adams | Presidential Range | mountain | Coos County, New Hampshire | | 1,766 | 44.3206°N 71.2914°W |
| Mount Aeolus | Taconic Mountains | mountain | Bennington County, Vermont | | 985 | 43.2406°N 73.0387°W |
| Mount Albert | Chic-Choc Mountains | mountain | Gaspésie–Îles-de-la-Madeleine, Quebec | | 1,151 | 48.9214°N 66.1949°W |
| Mount Ascutney | Green Mountains | mountain | Windsor County, Vermont | | 958 | 43.4445°N 72.4537°W |
| Mount Bigelow | Longfellow Mountains | mountain | Somerset County and Franklin County, Maine | | 1,263 | 45.1473°N 70.2892°W |
| Mount Blue | White Mountains | mountain | Grafton County, New Hampshire | | 1,380 | 44.0309°N 71.8204°W |
| Mount Cammerer | Great Smoky Mountains | mountain | Cocke County, Tennessee, and Haywood County, North Carolina | | 1,502 | 35.7633°N 83.1614°W |
| Mount Carleton | Appalachian Mountains | mountain | Northumberland County, New Brunswick | | 820 | 47.3833°N 66.8833°W |
| Mount Clay | White Mountains | mountain | Coos County, New Hampshire | | 1,686 | 44.2852°N 71.3158°W |
| Mount Collins | Great Smoky Mountains | mountain | Sevier County, Tennessee, and Swain County, North Carolina | | 1,886 | 35.5864°N 83.4728°W |
| Mount Craig | Black Mountains | mountain | Yancey County, North Carolina | | 2,026 | 35.7774°N 82.2618°W |
| Mount Davis | Presidential Range | mountain | Coos County, New Hampshire | | 1,164 | 44.2042°N 71.3106°W |
| Mount Davis | Allegheny Mountains | mountain | Somerset County, Pennsylvania | | 979 | 39.7862°N 79.1759°W |
| Mount Defiance | Ramapo Mountains | mountain | Passaic County, New Jersey | | 317 | 41.124°N 74.2293°W |
| Mount Defiance | Appalachian Mountains | hill | Essex County, New York | | 260 | 43.8314°N 73.4067°W |
| Mount Doublehead | White Mountains | mountain | Carroll County, New Hampshire | | 931 | 44.1677°N 71.1301°W |
| Mount Eisenhower | Presidential Range | mountain | Coos County, New Hampshire | | 1,451 | 44.2407°N 71.3503°W |
| Mount Ellen | Green Mountains | mountain | Washington County, Vermont | | 1,244 | 44.1598°N 72.9288°W |
| Mount Everett | Taconic Mountains | mountain | Berkshire County, Massachusetts | | 793 | 42.1019°N 73.4325°W |
| Mount Field | White Mountains | mountain | Grafton County, New Hampshire | | 1,319 | 44.1962°N 71.4345°W |
| Mount Flume | White Mountains | mountain | Grafton County, New Hampshire | | 1,319 | 44.1090°N 71.6279°W |
| Mount Franklin | Presidential Range | mountain | Coos County, New Hampshire | | 1,524 | 44.2495°N 71.3306°W |
| Mount Fray | Taconic Mountains | mountain | Berkshire County, Massachusetts, and Columbia County, New York | | 577 | 42.1569°N 73.4814°W |
| Mount Frissell | Taconic Range | mountain | Berkshire County, Massachusetts | | 748 | 42.0506°N 73.4822°W |
| Mount Garfield | White Mountains | mountain | Grafton County, New Hampshire | | 1,366 | 44.187°N 71.6109°W |
| Mount Gosford | Notre Dame Mountains | mountain | Saint-Augustin-de-Woburn, Quebec | | 1,193 | 45.3017°N 70.8678°W |
| Mount Greylock | Taconic Mountains | mountain | Berkshire County, Massachusetts | | 1,064 | 42.6375°N 73.1667°W |
| Mount Guyot | White Mountains | mountain | Grafton County, New Hampshire | | 1,396 | 44.1681°N 71.534°W |
| Mount Guyot | Great Smoky Mountains | mountain | Sevier County, Tennessee, and Haywood County, North Carolina | | 2,018 | 35.705°N 83.2575°W |
| Mount Hancock | White Mountains | mountain | Grafton County, New Hampshire | | 1,342 | 44.0837°N 71.4937°W |
| Mount Hereford | Notre Dame Mountains | mountain | Estrie, Quebec | | 864 | 45.0822°N 71.6014°W |
| Mount Holyoke | Holyoke Range | mountain | Hampshire County, Massachusetts | | 285 | 42.3008°N 72.5869°W |
| Mount Isolation | Presidential Range | mountain | Coos County, New Hampshire | | 1,220 | 44.2148°N 71.3092°W |
| Mount Jackson | Presidential Range | mountain | Coos County, New Hampshire | | 1,235 | 44.1945°N 71.3887°W |
| Mount Jefferson | Catskill Mountains | mountain | Schoharie County, New York | | 835 | 42.4584°N 74.6196°W |
| Mount Jefferson | Presidential Range | mountain | Coos County, New Hampshire | | 1,741 | 44.3042°N 71.3168°W |
| Mount Katahdin | Appalachian Mountains | mountain | Piscataquis County, Maine | | 1,606 | 45.9044°N 68.9213°W |
| Mount Kephart | Great Smoky Mountains | mountain | Sevier County, Tennessee, and Swain County, North Carolina | | 1,895 | 35.6310°N 83.3899°W |
| Mount Kineo | Appalachian Mountains | mountain | Piscataquis County, Maine | | 545 | 45.6997°N 69.7339°W |
| Mount Lafayette | Franconia Range | mountain | Grafton County, New Hampshire | | 1,600 | 44.1607°N 71.6444°W |
| Mount Le Conte | Great Smoky Mountains | mountain | Sevier County, Tennessee | | 2,010 | 35.6542°N 83.4367°W |
| Mount Liberty | Franconia Range | mountain | Grafton County, New Hampshire | | 1,359 | 44.1158°N 71.6421°W |
| Mount Lincoln | Franconia Range | mountain | Grafton County, New Hampshire | | 1,551 | 44.149°N 71.6445°W |
| Mount Madison | Presidential Range | mountain | Coos County, New Hampshire | | 1,636 | 44.3283°N 71.2783°W |
| Mount Mansfield | Green Mountains | mountain | Chittenden County and Lamoille County, Vermont | | 1,339 | 44.5436°N 72.8142°W |
| Mount Megunticook | Camden Hills | mountain | Knox County, Maine | | 422 | 44.2413°N 68.0674°W |
| Mount Mitchell | Blue Ridge Mountains | mountain | Yancey County, North Carolina | | 2,037 | 35.7647°N 82.2653°W |
| Mount Monroe | Presidential Range | mountain | Coos County, New Hampshire | | 1,637 | 44.2556°N 71.3225°W |
| Mount Moosilauke | White Mountains | mountain | Grafton County, New Hampshire | | 1,464 | 44.0245°N 71.8309°W |
| Mount Musgrave | Long Range Mountains | mountain | Newfoundland and Labrador | | 546 | 48.93°N 57.8339°W |
| Mount Nittany | Allegheny Mountains | mountain | Centre County, Pennsylvania | | 633 | 40.8277°N 77.7731°W |
| Mount Nonotuck | Mount Tom Range | mountain | Hampden County, Massachusetts | | 252 | 42.2799°N 72.6203°W |
| Mount Norwottuck | Holyoke Range | mountain | Hampshire County, Massachusetts | | 337 | 42.3056°N 72.5100°W |
| Mount Oglethorpe | Blue Ridge Mountains | mountain | Pickens County, Georgia | | 1,002 | 34.4861°N 84.3303°W |
| Mount Osceola | White Mountains | mountain | Grafton County, New Hampshire | | 1,315 | 44.0016°N 71.5356°W |
| Mount Passaconaway | White Mountains | mountain | Grafton County, New Hampshire | | 1,232 | 43.9547°N 71.3814°W |
| Mount Pierce | Presidential Range | mountain | Coos County, New Hampshire | | 1,314 | 44.226°N 71.366°W |
| Mount Pinacle | Sutton Mountains | mountain | Coaticook, Quebec | | 712 | 45.0236°N 71.8969°W |
| Mount Pinnacle | Sutton Mountains | mountain | Estrie, Quebec | | 665 | 45.0467°N 72.7394°W |
| Mount Pisgah | Endless Mountains | mountain | Bradford County, Pennsylvania | | 689 | 41.8098°N 76.7159°W |
| Mount Pisgah | Blue Ridge Mountains | mountain | Buncombe County and Haywood County, North Carolina | | 1,744 | 35.4255°N 82.7569°W |
| Mount Pisgah | Notre Dame Mountains | mountain | Le Granit, Quebec, and Franklin County, Maine | | 1,023 | 45.3789°N 70.6614°W |
| Mount Pisgah | Green Mountains | mountain | Orleans County, Vermont | | 849 | 44.7297°N 72.0308°W |
| Mount Pisgah | Appalachian Mountains | mountain | Carbon County, Pennsylvania | | 415 | 41.80984°N 76.71591°W |
| Mount Pleasant Caldera | Appalachian Mountains | mountain | New Brunswick | | 248 | 45.7378°N 67.3306°W |
| Mount Race | Taconic Mountains | mountain | Berkshire County, Massachusetts | | 721 | 42.0825°N 73.4322°W |
| Mount Raimer | Taconic Mountains | mountain | Rensselaer County, New York | | 784 | 42.7164°N 73.2836°W |
| Mount Rogers | Blue Ridge Mountains | mountain | Smyth County and Grayson County, Virginia | | 1,746 | 36.6598°N 81.5446°W |
| Mount Sanford | Metacomet Ridge | mountain | Bethany, Connecticut | | 270 | 41.4617°N 72.9486°W |
| Mount Snow | Green Mountains | mountain | Windham County, Vermont | | 1,093 | 42.9589°N 72.9236°W |
| Mount Toby | Metacomet Ridge | mountain | Franklin County, Massachusetts | | 387 | 42.4878°N 72.5375°W |
| Mount Tom | Mount Tom Range | mountain | Hampden County and Hampshire County, Massachusetts | | 366 | 42.2417°N 72.6481°W |
| Mount Tom Range | Metacomet Ridge | mountain range | Hampden County and Hampshire County, Massachusetts | Mount Tom | 366 | 42.2417°N 72.6481°W |
| Mount Tremper | Catskill Mountains | mountain | Ulster County, New York | | 835 | 42.0742°N 74.2775°W |
| Mount Wachusett | Appalachian Mountains | mountain | Worcester County, Massachusetts | | 611 | 42.4889°N 71.8875°W |
| Mount Washington | White Mountains | mountain | Coos County, New Hampshire | | 1,917 | 44.2708°N 71.3035°W |
| Mount Webster | Presidential Range | mountain | Coos County and Carroll County, New Hampshire | | 1,192 | 44.1948°N 71.3882°W |
| Mount Wilkinson | Appalachian Mountains | mountain | Cobb County, Georgia | | 299 | 33.8687°N 84.4666°W |
| Mount Wilson | Green Mountains | mountain | Addison County, Vermont | | 1,152 | 44.0048°N 72.9259°W |
| Negro Mountain | Allegheny Mountains | mountain | Somerset County, Pennsylvania, and Garrett County, Maryland | | 979 | 39.7861°N 79.175°W |
| Neighbor Mountain | Blue Ridge Mountains | mountain | Page County, Virginia | | 796 | 38.6961°N 78.3575°W |
| North Brother | Appalachian Mountains | mountain | Piscataquis County, Maine | | 1,260 | 45.9573°N 68.9854°W |
| North Dome | Catskill Mountains | mountain | Greene County, New York | | 1,100 | 42.1738°N 74.3488°W |
| North Eaglenest Mountain | Plott Balsams | mountain | Haywood County, North Carolina | | 1,547 | 35.5006°N 83.0417°W |
| North Mountain | Allegheny Mountains | mountain | Pennsylvania | | 788 | 41.3194°N 76.5539°W |
| North Mountain | Allegheny Mountains | mountain | Virginia and West Virginia | | 510 | 39.4206°N 78.0889°W |
| North Mountain | Catskill Escarpment | mountain | Greene County, New York | | 969 | 42.2175°N 74.0492°W |
| Notre Dame Mountains | Appalachian Mountains | mountain range | Quebec, New Brunswick, and Maine | Mont Jacques-Cartier | 1,270 | 48.75°N 66°W |
| Old Black | Great Smoky Mountains | mountain | North Carolina and Tennessee | | 1,942 | 35.7147°N 83.2553°W |
| Old Rag Mountain | Blue Ridge Mountains | mountain | Madison County, Virginia | | 1,001 | 38.5518°N 78.3145°W |
| Old Speck Mountain | Mahoosuc Range | mountain | Oxford County, Maine | | 1,271 | 44.5712°N 70.9537°W |
| Osterhout Mountain | Appalachian Mountains | mountain | Wyoming County, Pennsylvania | | 573 | 41.5362°N 75.8986°W |
| Overlook Mountain | Catskill Mountains | mountain | Ulster County, New York | | 957 | 42.0863°N 74.0934°W |
| Owl's Head | White Mountains | mountain | Grafton County, New Hampshire | | 1,227 | 44.1444°N 71.605°W |
| Pain de Sucre | Cape Breton Highlands | mountain | Inverness County, Nova Scotia | | 420 | 46.422°N 60.93°W |
| Panther Mountain | Catskill Mountains | mountain | Ulster County, New York | | 1,134 | 42.0564°N 74.395°W |
| Paris Mountain | Blue Ridge Mountains | mountain | Clarke County and Loudoun County, Virginia | | 587 | 39.0327°N 77.9273°W |
| Parnell Knob | Allegheny Mountains | mountain | Franklin County, Pennsylvania | | 616 | 39.9179°N 77.8612°W |
| Peak Mountain | Metacomet Ridge | mountain | East Granby, Connecticut | | 113 | 41.9593°N 72.7393°W |
| Peak Mountain (North Carolina) | Blue Ridge Mountains | mountain | Avery County, North Carolina | | 1,500 | 36.1308°N 81.8336°W |
| Peaked Mountain | Appalachian Mountains | mountain | Aroostook County, Maine | | 679 | 46.5700°N 68.8140°W |
| Peaks of Otter | Blue Ridge Mountains | mountain | Bedford County and Botetourt County, Virginia | | 1,177 | 37.4469°N 79.5836°W |
| Peck Mountain | Metacomet Ridge | mountain | Cheshire, Connecticut | | 113 | 41.5217°N 72.9208°W |
| Peekamoose Mountain | Catskill Mountains | mountain | Ulster County, New York | | 1,171 | 41.953°N 74.3982°W |
| Peter's Rock | Metacomet Ridge | mountain | North Haven, Connecticut | | 114 | 41.3419°N 72.8531°W |
| Petit Mont Sainte-Anne | McGerrigle Mountains | mountain | Gaspésie–Îles-de-la-Madeleine, Quebec | | 1,147 | 49.0103°N 66.0075°W |
| Petticoat Hill | The Berkshires | mountain | Hampshire County, Massachusetts | | 360 | 42.3817°N 72.7447°W |
| Pic a Tenerife | Long Range Mountains | mountain | Newfoundland and Labrador | | 545 | 49.4361°N 57.9231°W |
| Pic de l'Aurore | Appalachian Mountains | mountain | Le Rocher-Percé, Quebec | | 836 | 48.5344°N 64.23°W |
| Pic du Vieillard | McGerrigle Mountains | mountain | Gaspésie–Îles-de-la-Madeleine, Quebec | | 1,020 | 48.9942°N 65.8956°W |
| Pico Peak | Coolidge Range | mountain | Rutland County, Vermont | | 1,206 | 43.6393°N 72.8363°W |
| Pignut Mountain | Blue Ridge Mountains | mountain | Rappahannock County, Virginia | | 773 | 38.7178°N 78.2642°W |
| Pine Knob | Allegheny Mountains | mountain | Blair County, Pennsylvania | | 824 | 40.3322°N 78.515°W |
| Pine Log Mountain | Appalachian Mountains | mountain | Bartow County and Cherokee County, Georgia | | 713 | 34.3217°N 84.6371°W |
| Pine Mountain | Taconic Mountains | mountain | Berkshire County, Massachusetts | | 677 | 42.4942°N 73.3202°W |
| Pine Mountain | Cumberland Mountains | mountain range | Kentucky, Tennessee, and Virginia | | 998 | 37.0514°N 82.8736°W |
| Pinnacle Mountain | Blue Ridge Mountains | mountain | Pickens County, South Carolina | | 1,041 | 35.0336°N 82.7414°W |
| Pinnacle Rock | Metacomet Ridge | mountain | Hartford County, Connecticut | | 183 | 41.6897°N 72.8328°W |
| Pistapaug Mountain | Metacomet Ridge | mountain | Durham, Connecticut | | 210 | 41.4333°N 72.7369°W |
| Pixie Mountain | Blue Ridge Mountains | mountain | Avery County, North Carolina | | 1,237 | 36.0617°N 81.8767°W |
| Pochuck Mountain | New York–New Jersey Highlands | mountain | Sussex County, New Jersey, and Orange County, New York | | 364 | 41.2111°N 74.5306°W |
| Pocono Mountains | Appalachian Mountains | mountain range | Pennsylvania | Camelback Mountain | 650 | 41.2486°N 75.2486°W |
| Pocumtuck Range | Metacomet Ridge | mountain | Franklin County, Massachusetts | Pocumtuck Rock | 258 | 42.5333°N 72.5917°W |
| Pohatcong Mountain | Appalachian Mountains | mountain | Warren County, New Jersey | | 264 | 40.7303°N 75.0175°W |
| Poor Mountain | Blue Ridge Mountains | mountain | Pulaski County and Montgomery County, Virginia | | 1,197 | 37.1796°N 80.1628°W |
| Popolopen | Hudson Highlands | mountain | Orange County, New York | | 287 | 41.3269°N 74.0103°W |
| Poppy Mountain | Taconic Mountains | mountain | Berkshire County, Massachusetts | | 704 | 42.5236°N 73.3098°W |
| Potter Mountain | Taconic Mountains | mountain | Berkshire County, Massachusetts | | 741 | 42.5473°N 73.2761°W |
| Presidential Range | White Mountains | mountain range | Coos County, New Hampshire | Mount Washington | 1,916 | 44.2708°N 71.3035°W |
| Promontory of Quebec | Appalachian Mountains | hill | Sainte-Foy–Sillery–Cap-Rouge, Quebec City, Quebec | | 105 | 46.772°N 71.302°W |
| Prospect Mountain | Green Mountains | mountain | Bennington County, Vermont | | 835 | 42.8744°N 73.0669°W |
| Provin Mountain | Metacomet Ridge | mountain | Hampden County, Massachusetts | | 183 | 42.0847°N 72.7039°W |
| Purcell Knob | Blue Ridge Mountains | mountain | Loudoun County, Virginia | | 368 | 39.2582°N 77.7497°W |
| Puzzle Mountain | Longfellow Mountains | mountain | Oxford County, Maine | | 955 | 44.5443°N 70.7933°W |
| Quirauk Mountain | South Mountain | mountain | Washington County, Maryland | | 654 | 39.6963°N 77.5127°W |
| Rabun Bald | Blue Ridge Mountains | mountain | Rabun County, Georgia | | 1,431 | 34.9656°N 83.3000°W |
| Ragged Mountain | Metacomet Ridge | mountain | Hartford County, Connecticut | | 232 | 41.6175°N 72.8228°W |
| Ragged Mountain | Appalachian Mountains | mountain | Merrimack County, New Hampshire | | 690 | 43.4681°N 71.8294°W |
| Ramapo Mountains | New York–New Jersey Highlands | mountain range | New Jersey and New York | | 355 | 41.1723°N 74.1001°W |
| Rattlesnake Mountain | Metacomet Ridge | mountain | Farmington, Connecticut | | 229 | 41.6997°N 72.8328°W |
| Raven Rocks | Blue Ridge Mountains | mountain | Jefferson County, West Virginia | | 443 | 39.1401°N 77.8347°W |
| Rays Hill | Allegheny Mountains | mountain | Pennsylvania | | 745 | 39.9056°N 78.2661°W |
| Red Rock Mountain | Appalachian Mountains | mountain | Pennsylvania | | 746 | 41.3086°N 76.3094°W |
| Rendezvous Mountain | Blue Ridge Mountains | mountain | Wilkes County, North Carolina | | 753 | 36.1338°N 81.1734°W |
| Rich Mountain | Blue Ridge Mountains | mountain | Watauga County, North Carolina | | 1,445 | 36.2356°N 81.7058°W |
| Rich Mountain Bald | Blue Ridge Mountains | mountain | Watauga County, North Carolina | | 1,634 | 36.3122°N 81.7167°W |
| Ritchey Knob | Allegheny Mountains | mountain | Blair County, Pennsylvania | | 873 | 40.3446°N 78.5192°W |
| River Knobs | Allegheny Mountains | mountain | Pendleton County, West Virginia | | 870 | 38.7369°N 79.4347°W |
| Rocky Mountain | Appalachian Mountains | mountain | Aroostook County, Maine | | 618 | 47.1918°N 69.2816°W |
| Rocky Mountain | Blue Ridge Mountains | mountain | Rockbridge County and Amherst County, Virginia | | 1,241 | 37.7955°N 79.1808°W |
| Rocky Mountain | Catskill Mountains | mountain | Ulster County, New York | | 1,069 | 41.9727°N 74.3732°W |
| Rocky Mountain | Ramapo Mountains | mountain | Bergen County, New Jersey | | 322 | 41.0918°N 74.2151°W |
| Rossiter Hill | Caledonian Highland | mountain | New Brunswick | | 385 | 45.6163°N 65.0489°W |
| Round Mountain | Taconic Mountains | mountain | Litchfield County, Connecticut | | 700 | 42.0489°N 73.4764°W |
| Round Mountain | Holyoke Range | mountain | Hampshire County, Massachusetts | | 238 | 42.3023°N 72.5251°W |
| Round Top | Sutton Mountains | mountain | Estrie, Quebec | | 962 | 45.08111°N 72.5475°W |
| Rounds Mountain | Taconic Mountains | mountain | Rensselaer County, New York | | 688 | 42.5692°N 73.3369°W |
| Roundtop Hill | Allegheny Mountains | mountain | Washington County, Maryland | | 410 | 39.6779°N 78.2345°W |
| Rusk Mountain | Catskill Mountains | mountain | Greene County, New York | | 1,125 | 42.2006°N 74.2769°W |
| Saddle Hill | Notre Dame Mountains | mountain | Estrie, Quebec, and Oxford County, Maine | | 972 | 45.3442°N 71.0014°W |
| Saltonstall Mountain | Metacomet Ridge | mountain | New Haven County, Connecticut | | 98 | 41.3246°N 72.7995°W |
| Sandy Bay Mountain | Longfellow Mountains | mountain | Somerset County, Maine, and Saint-Ludger, Quebec | | 950 | 45.7543°N 70.3938°W |
| Sassafras Mountain | Blue Ridge Mountains | mountain | Pickens County, South Carolina, and Transylvania County, North Carolina | | 1,085 | 35.0648°N 82.7774°W |
| Sawnee Mountain | Appalachian Mountains | mountain | Forsyth County, Georgia | | 593 | 34.2367°N 84.1606°W |
| Schaefer Head | Allegheny Mountains | mountain | Blair County, Pennsylvania | | 899 | 40.3226°N 78.5598°W |
| Seneca Rocks | Allegheny Mountains | mountain | Pendleton County, West Virginia | | 736 | 38.8353°N 79.3656°W |
| Seven Sisters | Holyoke Range | mountain | Hampshire County, Massachusetts | | 288 | 42.3038°N 72.5645°W |
| Shaker Mountain | Taconic Mountains | mountain | Berkshire County, Massachusetts | | 559 | 42.4459°N 73.3371°W |
| Shawangunk Ridge | Appalachian Mountains | ridge | New York | | 698 | 41.7039°N 74.3447°W |
| Short Hill Mountain | Blue Ridge Mountains | mountain | Loudoun County, Virginia | | 440 | 39.2691°N 77.7069°W |
| Short Mountain | Metacomet Ridge | mountain | Hartford County, Connecticut | | 162 | 41.6025°N 72.8242°W |
| Shrewsbury Peak | Coolidge Range | mountain | Rutland County, Vermont | | 1,122 | 43.5757°N 72.806°W |
| Sidneys Knob | Allegheny Mountains | mountain | Fulton County, Pennsylvania | | 645 | 40.0618°N 77.9054°W |
| Signal Mountain | Green Mountains | mountain | Caledonia County, Vermont | | 1,030 | 44.2063°N 72.3252°W |
| Silers Bald | Great Smoky Mountains | mountain | Sevier County, Tennessee, and Swain County, North Carolina | | 1,709 | 35.5658°N 83.5653°W |
| Slaughter Mountain | Blue Ridge Mountains | mountain | Union County, Georgia | | 1,322 | 34.7478°N 83.9503°W |
| Sleeping Giant | Metacomet Ridge | mountain | Hamden, Connecticut | | 225 | 41.4306°N 72.8908°W |
| Slide Mountain | Catskill Mountains | mountain | Ulster County, New York | | 1,270 | 41.9986°N 74.3864°W |
| Smith Mountain | Taconic Mountains | mountain | Berkshire County, Massachusetts | | 661 | 42.4826°N 73.3354°W |
| Snake Mountain (North Carolina – Tennessee) | Blue Ridge Mountains | mountain | Watauga County, North Carolina, and Johnson County, Tennessee | | 1,696 | 36.3311°N 81.7075°W |
| South Mountain | Hanging Hills | mountain | Hartford County and New Haven County, Connecticut | | 234 | 41.5544°N 72.8236°W |
| South Mountain | Appalachian Mountains | mountain | Nova Scotia | | 280 | 44.8333°N 64.5833°W |
| South Mountain | Blue Ridge Mountains | mountain | Maryland and Pennsylvania | Quirauk Mountain | 655 | 39.72°N 77.49°W |
| Spanish Oak Mountain | Blue Ridge Mountains | mountain | Avery County, North Carolina | | 1,381 | 36.0681°N 81.9397°W |
| Springer Mountain | Blue Ridge Mountains | mountain | Fannin County and Gilmer County, Georgia | | 1,148 | 34.6267°N 84.1936°W |
| Spruce Knob | Allegheny Mountains | mountain | Pendleton County, West Virginia | | 1,482 | 38.6999°N 79.5328°W |
| Squirrel Mountain | Cape Breton Highlands | mountain | Cape Breton Island, Nova Scotia | | 420 | 46.536°N 60.976°W |
| Stone Mountain | Allegheny Mountains | mountain | Huntingdon County and Mifflin County, Pennsylvania | | 668 | 40.5486°N 77.8428°W |
| Stone Mountain | Blue Ridge Mountains | mountain | Alleghany County and Wilkes County, North Carolina | | 703 | 36.3936°N 81.0433°W |
| Storm King Mountain | Hudson Highlands | mountain | Orange County, New York | | 411 | 41.4329°N 73.9946°W |
| Stratton Mountain | Green Mountains | mountain | Windham County, Vermont | | 1,200 | 43.0862°N 72.9252°W |
| Sugar Mountain | Blue Ridge Mountains | mountain | Avery County, North Carolina | | 1,596 | 36.1247°N 81.8758°W |
| Sugarloaf Hill | Hudson Highlands | mountain | Putnam County, New York | | 232 | 41.3608°N 73.9464°W |
| Sugarloaf Knob | Allegheny Mountains | mountain | Fayette County, Pennsylvania | | 810 | 39.8313°N 79.465°W |
| Sugarloaf Mountain | Pocumtuck Range | mountain | Franklin County, Massachusetts | | 199 | 42.4728°N 72.5975°W |
| Sugarloaf Mountain | Blue Ridge Mountains | mountain | Frederick County, Maryland | | 391 | 39.2624°N 77.3934°W |
| Sugarloaf Mountain | Hudson Highlands | mountain | Dutchess County, New York | | 274 | 41.4583°N 73.975°W |
| Sugarloaf Mountain | Longfellow Mountains | mountain | Franklin County, Maine | | 1,291 | 45.0314°N 70.3131°W |
| Sugarloaf Mountain | Appalachian Mountains | mountain | New Brunswick | | 281 | 47.9897°N 66.6856°W |
| Sunday River Whitecap | Mahoosuc Range | mountain | Oxford County, Maine | | 1,017 | 44.5492°N 70.8967°W |
| Sutton Mountains | Green Mountains | mountain range | Estrie, Quebec | Mont Round Top | 962 | 45.08528°N 72.53861°W |
| Sweat Mountain | Appalachian Mountains | mountain | Cobb County, Georgia | | 515 | 34.0669°N 84.4556°W |
| Table Mountain | Catskill Mountains | mountain | Ulster County, New York | | 1,173 | 41.9587°N 74.4048°W |
| Table Rock | Blue Ridge Mountains | mountain | Burke County, North Carolina | | 1,250 | 35.886°N 81.8845°W |
| Tablelands | Long Range Mountains | mountain | Newfoundland and Labrador | | 721 | 49.4333°N 57.9825°W |
| Taconic Mountains | Appalachian Mountains | mountain range | Connecticut, Massachusetts, New York, and Vermont | Equinox Mountain | 1,173 | 42.69°N 73.29°W |
| Talcott Mountain | Metacomet Ridge | mountain | Hartford County, Connecticut | | 290 | 41.825°N 72.798°W |
| Tekoa Mountain | The Berkshires | mountain | Hampden County, Massachusetts | | 342 | 42.1686°N 72.8131°W |
| The Berkshires | Appalachian Mountains | mountain range | Massachusetts | Mount Greylock | 866 | 42.1668°N 73.1496°W |
| The Cabox | Long Range Mountains | mountain | Newfoundland and Labrador | | 812 | 48.8331°N 58.4842°W |
| The Priest | Blue Ridge Mountains | mountain | Nelson County, Virginia | | 1,238 | 37.8198°N 79.0625°W |
| Thomas Cole Mountain | Catskill Mountains | mountain | Greene County, New York | | 1,200 | 42.2708°N 74.1362°W |
| Three Top Mountain | Blue Ridge Mountains | mountain | Ashe County, North Carolina | | 1,530 | 36.4258°N 81.5786°W |
| Thunderhead Mountain | Great Smoky Mountains | mountain | Blount County, Tennessee, and Swain County, North Carolina | | 1,685 | 35.5686°N 83.7064°W |
| Tomkins Knob | Blue Ridge Mountains | mountain | North Carolina | | 1,242 | 36.2406°N 81.4772°W |
| Totoket Mountain | Metacomet Ridge | mountain | New Haven County, Connecticut | | 220 | 41.4139°N 72.7028°W |
| Tower Mountain | Taconic Mountains | mountain | Berkshire County, Massachusetts | | 668 | 42.4984°N 73.3317°W |
| Traveler Mountain | Appalachian Mountains | mountain | Piscataquis County, Maine | | 1,080 | 46.0727°N 68.8446°W |
| Tray Mountain | Blue Ridge Mountains | mountain | Georgia | | 1,350 | 34.8011°N 83.6839°W |
| Trimountain | Metacomet Ridge | mountain | New Haven County and Middlesex County, Connecticut | | 230 | 41.4603°N 72.7361°W |
| Tussey Mountain | Allegheny Mountains | mountain | Pennsylvania | | 835 | 40.2101°N 78.3322°W |
| Twelve O'clock Knob | Appalachian Mountains | mountain | Roanoke County, Virginia | | 814 | 37.2486°N 80.0845°W |
| Vly Mountain | Catskill Mountains | mountain | Greene County, New York | | 1,076 | 42.2458°N 74.4483°W |
| Wawayanda Mountain | New York–New Jersey Highlands | mountain | Sussex County, New Jersey | | 448 | 41.1975°N 74.4619°W |
| West Peak | Hanging Hills | mountain | Meriden, Connecticut | | 312 | 41.5625°N 72.8444°W |
| West Rock Ridge | Metacomet Ridge | mountain | New Haven County, Connecticut | | 213 | 41.3808°N 72.9783°W |
| West Suffield Mountain | Metacomet Ridge | mountain | Suffield, Connecticut | | 220 | 41.9944°N 72.7333°W |
| White Cap Mountain | Longfellow Mountains | mountain | Piscataquis County, Maine | | 1,114 | 45.5546°N 69.2463°W |
| White Hill | Cape Breton Highlands | hill | Nova Scotia | | 535 | 46.7°N 60.6°W |
| White Mountains | Appalachian Mountains | mountain range | New Hampshire and Maine | Mount Washington | 1,916 | 44.27°N 71.31°W |
| White Rock | Taconic Mountains | mountain | Rensselaer County, New York | | 777 | 42.7539°N 73.28°W |
| White Top | Cheat Mountain | summit | Randolph County, West Virginia | | 1,245 | 38.6244°N 79.8767°W |
| Whiteside Mountain | Blue Ridge Mountains | mountain | Jackson County, North Carolina | | 1,503 | 35.0809°N 83.1382°W |
| Whitetop Mountain | Blue Ridge Mountains | mountain | Virginia | | 1,682 | 36.6428°N 81.6078°W |
| Wildcat Mountain | Blue Ridge Mountains | mountain | White County, Georgia | | 1,146 | 34.7192°N 83.8394°W |
| Wilkie Sugar Loaf | Cape Breton Highlands | mountain hill | Nova Scotia | | 1,351 | 46.9553°N 60.4725°W |
| Williamsburg Mountain | Allegheny Mountains | mountain | Blair County and Huntingdon County, Pennsylvania | | 716 | 40.4976°N 78.1322°W |
| Wills Mountain | Allegheny Mountains | mountain | Bedford County, Pennsylvania, and Allegany County, Maryland | | 850 | 39.8460°N 78.6821°W |
| Windham High Peak | Catskill Mountains | mountain | Greene County, New York | | 1,074 | 42.3148°N 74.1432°W |
| Wolfpen Ridge | Blue Ridge Mountains | mountain | Towns County and Union County, Georgia | | 1,390 | 34.8636°N 83.8086°W |
| Woody's Knob | Blue Ridge Mountains | mountain | Mitchell County, North Carolina | | 1,273 | 35.8800°N 82.1043°W |
| Yokun Ridge | Taconic Mountains | mountain range | Berkshire County, Massachusetts | | 652 | 42.3514°N 73.3378°W |
| Young Lick | Blue Ridge Mountains | mountain | Georgia | | 1,161 | 34.8228°N 83.6525°W |

== See also ==
- List of mountains in Maryland
- List of mountains in Massachusetts
- List of mountains of New Hampshire
- List of mountains in North Carolina
- List of mountains of Vermont
- List of mountains in Virginia
- List of subranges of the Appalachian Mountains
