= Mount Richardson (Quebec) =

Mountain in Quebec, Canada

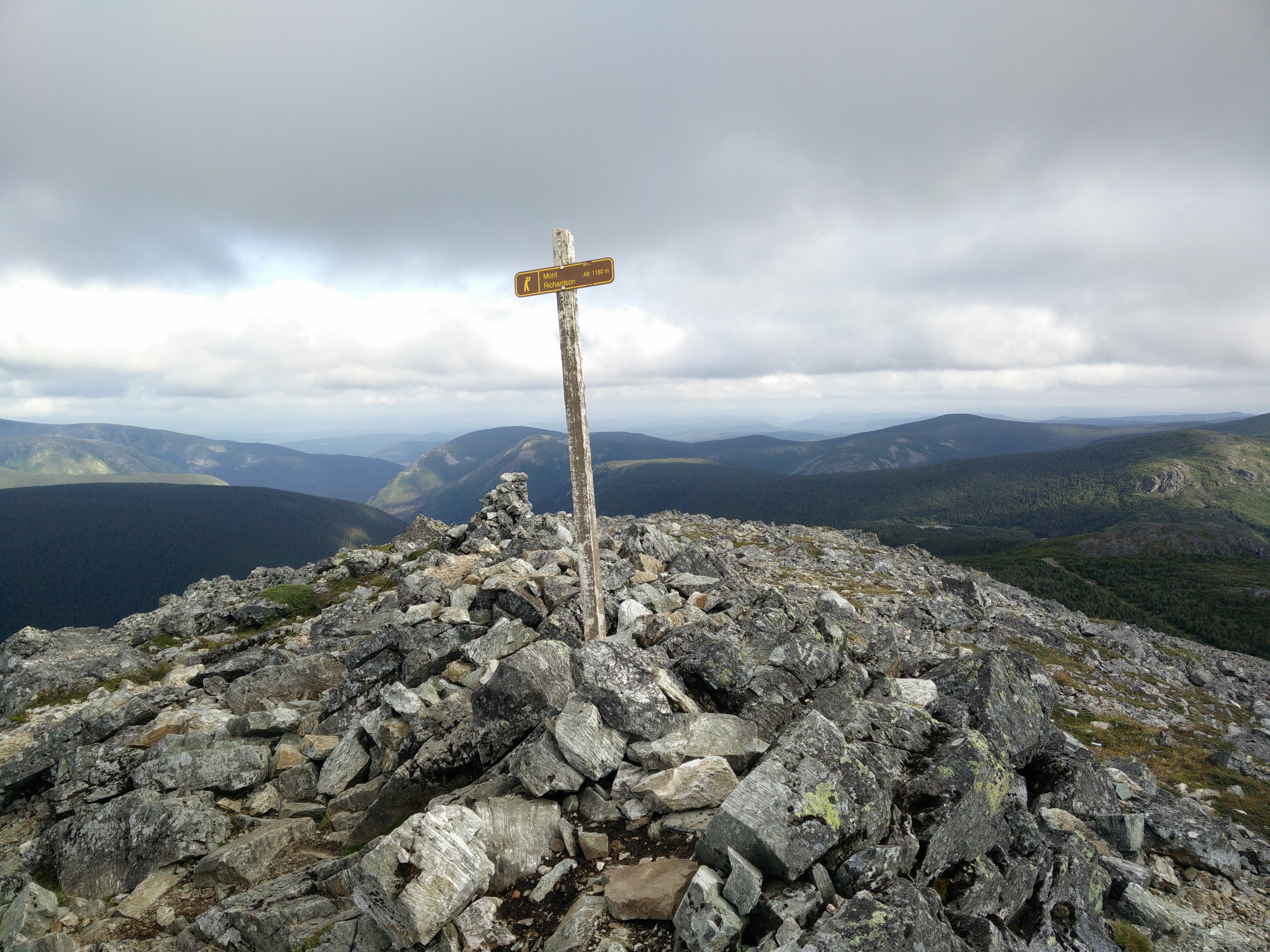

Highest point
- Elevation: 1,180 m (3,870 ft)
- Parent peak: McGerrigle Mountains (Chic-Choc Mountains, Notre Dame Mountains, Appalachian Mountains)
- Coordinates: 48.928°N 66.016667°W

Geography
- Country: Canada
- Province: Quebec
- Administrative region: Gaspésie–Îles-de-la-Madeleine
- Topo map: NTS 22B16 Mont Albert

Mount Richardson is located in unorganized territory of Mont-Albert, in La Haute-Gaspésie Regional County Municipality, in Gaspésie National Park, in administrative region of Gaspésie–Îles-de-la-Madeleine, in Quebec, Canada and its altitude is 1,180 metres (3,870 ft).

== Toponymy ==
The mount's name commemorates the geologist James Richardson (1810–1883), who explored the Gaspé Peninsula in 1858 on behalf of the Geological Survey of Canada. He enriched the collection of mineral specimens and introduced photography in the service of geological exploration. The name appeared on a geological map in 1925.

== Geography ==
It is part of the McGerrigle chain with Xalibu and Jacques-Cartier.

The alpine tundra dominates its cone-shaped summit offering a 360-degree point of view.
