= Humpback Mountain =

- Humpback Mountain (Cascades)
- Humpback Mountain (North Carolina)
- Humpback Mountain (Virginia)
- Humpback Mountain (British Columbia)
