= McGerrigle Mountains =

Mountain range of Gaspé Peninsula, Quebec, Canada

- Location within Quebec

Highest point
- Elevation: 1,268 m (4,160 ft)
- Prominence: Mount Jacques-Cartier
- Parent peak: Chic-Choc Mountains, Notre Dame Mountains, Appalachian Mountains
- Coordinates: 48°57′49″N 66°00′49″W

Dimensions
- Area: 100 km^{2} (39 mi^{2})

Geography
- Country: Canada
- Province: Quebec
- Administrative region: Gaspésie–Îles-de-la-Madeleine

The McGerrigle Mountains are a mountain range in the central part of Gaspésie in eastern Quebec, Canada. It is the main constituent of the Chic-Choc Mountains belonging to the Notre Dame Mountains, a subrange of the Appalachian chain.

== Toponymy ==
Formerly called Tabletop, in 1965 the massif was renamed McGerrigle Mountains in honor of the geologist Harold William McGerrigle (1904–1970) who worked for the government of Quebec between 1937 and 1970.

== Main peaks ==
- Mont Jacques-Cartier (1,268 metres [4,160 ft])
- Whaleback Mountain (1,249 metres [4,098 ft])
- Mont de la Passe (1,231 metres [4,039 ft])
- Mount Richardson (Quebec) (1,180 metres [3,870 ft])
- Mont Comte (1,229 metres [4,032 ft])
- Mont Rolland-Germain (1,204 metres [3,950 ft])
- Mont Les Cones (1,200 metres [3,900 ft])
- Mont du Vieillard (1,200 metres [3,900 ft])
- Table Mountain (1,180 metres [3,870 ft])
- Petit Mont Sainte-Anne (1,147 metres [3,763 ft])
- Mont Xalibu (1,140 metres [3,740 ft])
- Mont Joseph Fortin (1,080 metres [3,540 ft])

== See also ==
- List of mountains of Quebec
- List of subranges of the Appalachian Mountains
