= Mont Écho =

Mountain in Sutton, Quebec, Canada

- Echo Mountain
- Mount Echo seen from the Brock Memorial Park (Glen Sutton)

Highest point
- Elevation: 751 m (2,464 ft)
- Coordinates: 45°06′28″N 72°29′23″W

Naming
- English translation: Echo Mountain
- Language of name: French

Geography
- Location within Southern Quebec
- Location: Sutton, Quebec, Estrie, Quebec, Canada
- Parent range: Sutton Mountains (Green Mountains, Appalachian Mountains)
- Topo map: NTS 31H01

Mont Écho (Echo Mountain) is a 751-metre (2,464 ft) mountain peak in Sutton, in the Estrie region of southern Quebec, Canada. It is one of the principal summits of the Sutton Mountains, the northern extension of the Green Mountains and part of the Appalachian Mountains.

A commercial ski area operated on Mont Écho from 1963 until 1978. After the ski centre closed, trails across the mountain became part of the hiking network maintained by Sentiers de l'Estrie. Much of the surrounding Sutton Mountains is now protected within the Green Mountains Nature Reserve, a private conservation area owned by the Nature Conservancy of Canada.

== Toponymy ==
The name Mont Écho was officially adopted by the Commission de toponymie du Québec on 17 August 1978. The Commission does not identify an origin for the name and states that the reason the summit came to be called Écho is unknown. The English form Echo Mountain has also been recorded.

The name was in use well before its official recognition. Contemporary newspaper coverage referred to Mont Écho when the ski centre was being developed in 1963. Later accounts of the ski area state that the property on which it was developed had been known as Echo Valley, although the Commission de toponymie does not establish this as the origin of the mountain's name.

== Geography ==
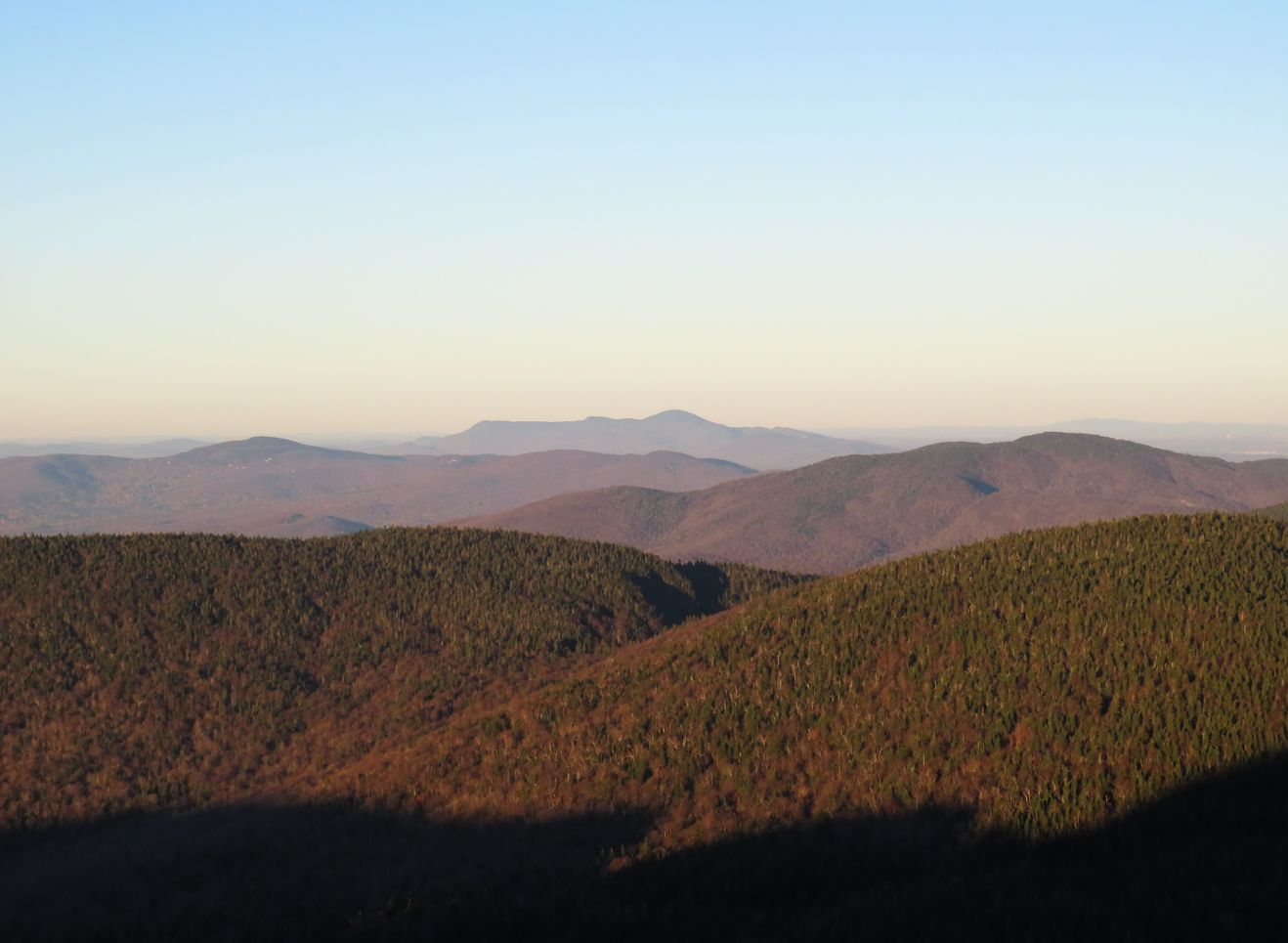
The Green Mountains of southern Quebec, viewed from Round Top in the Sutton Mountains

Mont Écho lies within the municipality of Sutton in the Brome-Missisquoi Regional County Municipality. The Commission de toponymie classifies it as a peak of the mountain named Mont Sutton, which forms part of the larger Sutton Mountains massif.

The Sutton Mountains form the northern continuation of the Green Mountains. In Quebec, the massif extends north from the Canada–United States border toward Saint-Étienne-de-Bolton and lies between the Missisquoi North River and the Sutton River. The Commission de toponymie lists Round Top, Mont Gagnon, Mont Écho, Mont Glen, Mont Foster and Montagne à Boyce among its principal summits.

Mont Écho reaches an officially recorded elevation of approximately 751 m (2,464 ft). Its summit is located at 45°06′28″N, 72°29′22″W on National Topographic System sheet 31H01.

The mountain is predominantly forested. It lies within a wider landscape of forest, streams and wetlands protected through the Green Mountains Nature Reserve and adjoining conservation lands. The reserve covers more than 78 km^{2} (30 sq mi) in the Sutton Mountains and is owned by the Nature Conservancy of Canada.

Near the eastern end of Chemin de la Falaise is the 2.9 ha (7.2 acres) Réserve naturelle de la Falaise, owned by the Mont Echo Conservation Association. The protected area contains woodland and a watercourse as well as plant and animal species with conservation status. Its name was officially recognized in 2012.

A proposed 2026 federal recovery strategy for the Adirondack/Appalachian population of the spring salamander (Gyrinophilus porphyriticus) identifies critical-habitat units around Mont Écho and neighbouring summits including Mont Gagnon, Montagne à Boyce and the Mont Sutton area.

== History ==
=== Early settlement ===
Settlement near the foot of Mont Écho dates to the late 18th century. Moses Westover, who came to the Sutton area from Massachusetts in 1796, settled near the junction of what are now Chemin du Mont-Écho and Chemin Élie.

In 1814, Stephen Westover built a grist mill and a sawmill on a stream at the foot of Mont Écho. The mills were among several water-powered mills established around Sutton during the settlement period; no remains of the early Westover mills survive.

=== Ski area ===
Mont Écho was developed as an alpine ski area in 1963. Five businessmen from Waterloo formed a company to develop land on the mountain, and the centre opened for the 1963–1964 ski season.

The new ski area had two double chairlifts and a Poma surface lift, with about fifteen marked trails. The longer chairlift climbed approximately 1,500 ft (457 m) over a line more than 7,000 ft (2,134 m) long. A La Presse article published shortly before the opening described it as the longest double chairlift in Canada.

A three-storey base lodge was subsequently constructed at the foot of the slopes. The ski centre was marketed largely through nearby Knowlton, since many visitors approached the mountain by way of Knowlton and Chemin du Mont-Écho, although the ski area itself was within Sutton.

The centre had some successful seasons during the 1960s, but its finances were unstable. By 1968 the property had been put up for sale, and financial institutions became involved in its operation. The ski area nevertheless remained open through most of the 1970s.

Its final season was the winter of 1977–1978. After the closure, neighbouring Mont Sutton acquired much of Mont Écho's chairlift infrastructure. Twenty-five of the former area's 29 lift towers were moved by helicopter in the autumn of 1978 and reused at Sutton.

The former ski runs were gradually reclaimed by forest after the centre closed. The base lodge remained in use for a number of years by a hunting and fishing club before being destroyed by fire in the mid-2000s.

=== Hiking and conservation ===
Organized hiking on Mont Écho developed as the ski operation was ending. Sentiers de l'Estrie, an organization created to establish a long-distance trail network through the Eastern Townships, completed its first trail section in 1977. In 1979, with assistance from a federal employment program, a new section was opened between Bolton-Centre and Mont Écho.

The trail system continued to expand southward through the Sutton Mountains during the 1980s and 1990s. Mont Écho became one of the areas crossed by the Sentiers de l'Estrie network, with access from the Chemin de la Falaise sector.

Conservation of the surrounding forest became a local issue in the 1990s. In 1994, residents mobilized over two forest properties owned by Domtar that were being offered for sale in the Nine Holes and Fullerton Pond sectors. The Mont Echo Conservation Association was established during this period, and the Nature Conservancy of Canada began considering the acquisition of lands in the Sutton Mountains.

The Nature Conservancy made its first major land acquisition in the Sutton Mountains in 2001. Further acquisitions and conservation agreements followed, creating what became the Green Mountains Nature Reserve. The reserve now protects more than 78 km^{2} (30 sq mi) and forms part of a cross-border conservation corridor extending toward protected lands in Vermont.

The Mont Echo Conservation Association remains involved in conservation in the sector and owns the Réserve naturelle de la Falaise near Mont Écho.

== 2025 forest fire ==
On 13 October 2025, a forest fire broke out near the summit of Mont Écho. Hiking trails were evacuated and closed while the Société de protection des forêts contre le feu (SOPFEU), Sutton firefighters and fire departments from surrounding municipalities responded. Air tankers were used during the first day of the operation. No injuries were reported.

The fire burned approximately 0.9 ha (2.2 acres) of forest. Authorities determined that it was human-caused, while the Sûreté du Québec investigated whether it had been started accidentally or deliberately.

Fire remained in the soil after the visible flames had been brought under control. The Town of Sutton announced on 6 November that firefighting operations were complete and that the fire had been extinguished. Trails remained closed while the affected area was assessed.

After safety work and assessment of the burned area, the Mont Écho trail reopened on 17 July 2026. A research project begun in May 2026 by the Université de Sherbrooke Department of Biology, in collaboration with the Nature Conservancy of Canada, is monitoring forest recovery. Vegetation in the burned area is to be surveyed annually to document the long-term effects of surface forest fire on a temperate forest.

== See also ==
- Green Mountains
- List of mountains of Quebec
- List of mountains of the Appalachians
- Mont Foster
- Mont Sutton
- Sutton, Quebec
