= Bellot Mountain =

Mountain in New Jersey, United States

Highest point
- Elevation: 745 ft (227 m) NGVD 29
- Coordinates: 41°05′57″N 74°15′10″W

Geography
- Location: Passaic County, New Jersey, U.S.
- Parent range: Ramapo Mountains
- Topo map: USGS Wanaque

Climbing
- Easiest route: Road

Bellot Mountain is a mountain in Passaic County, New Jersey. The peak rises to 745 feet (227 m), and overlooks Wanaque Reservoir to the west. It is part of the Ramapo Mountains.
