= Bald Mountain (New Jersey) =

Mountain in Bergen County, New Jersey

Highest point
- Elevation: 1,152 ft (351 m) NGVD 29
- Coordinates: 41°07′15″N 74°12′01″W

Geography
- Location: Bergen County, New Jersey, U.S.
- Parent range: Ramapo Mountains
- Topo map: USGS Ramsey

Climbing
- Easiest route: Hiking

Bald Mountain is a mountain in Bergen County, New Jersey, just south of the New York state line. The peak rises to 1,152 feet (351 m). It is part of Ringwood State Park in the Ramapo Mountains. This summit is the highest elevation in Bergen County.
