= Mount Hereford =

Mountain in Quebec, Canada

- Mont Hereford
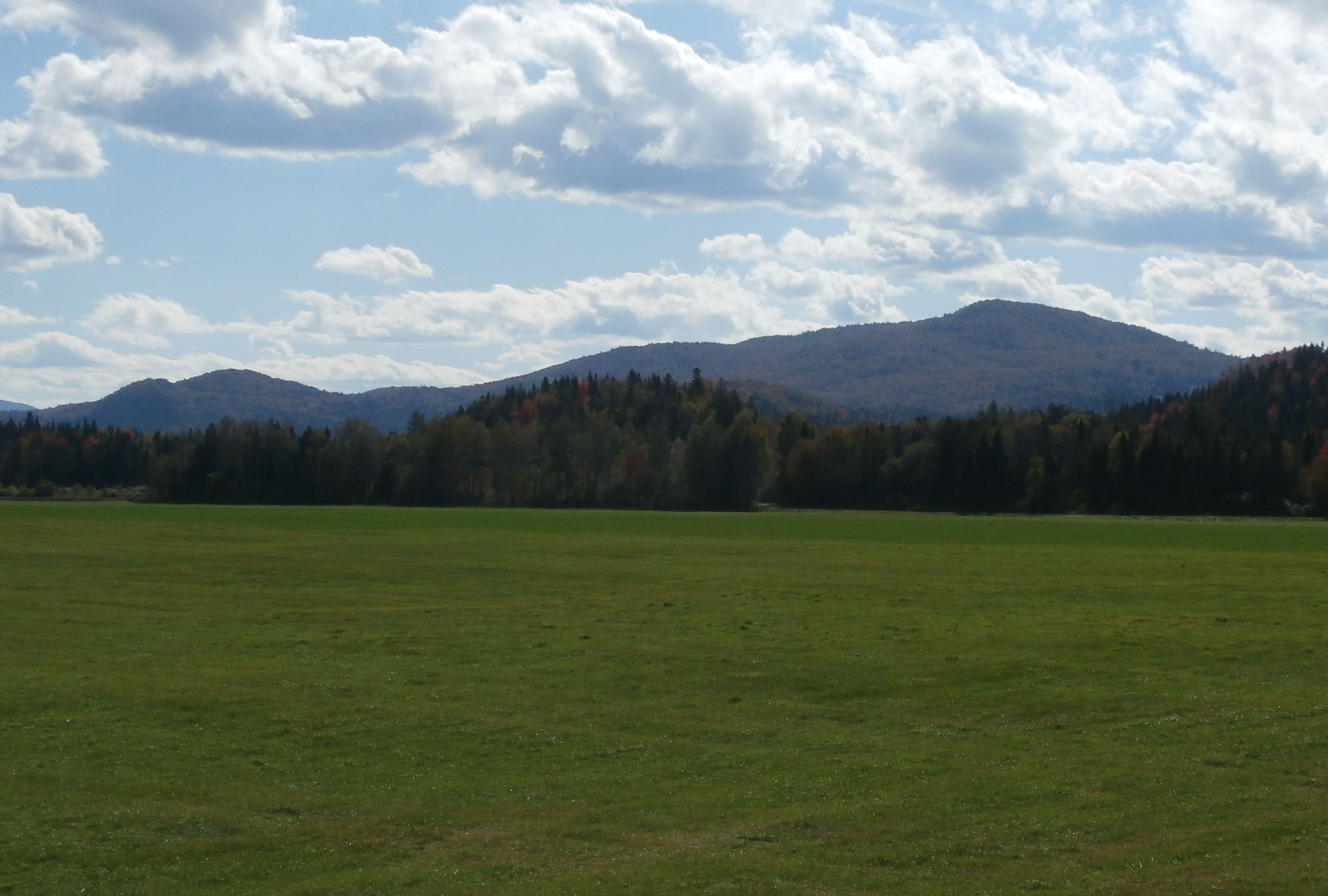

Highest point
- Elevation: 875 m (2,871 ft)
- Prominence: 379 m (1,243 ft)
- Isolation: 19.66 km (12.22 mi)
- Listing: Mountains of the Appalachians
- Coordinates: 45°04′56″N 71°36′05″W

Geography
- Location within Southern Quebec
- Country: Canada
- Province: Quebec
- Region: Estrie
- Parent range: Appalachian Mountains
- Topo map: NTS 21E4 Coaticook

Climbing
- Easiest route: hiking

Mount Hereford (French: Mont Hereford) is a mountain located in Coaticook Regional County Municipality, Estrie, Quebec, Canada. It rises to 864 metres (2,835 ft).

== Etymology ==
Mount Hereford is a reference to a city and a county of the same name in England. A dictionary from 1832 refers to it as "Hereford Mountain." However, some locals refer to it as Montagne à Goyette or Montagne chez Goyette (translation: Goyette's Mountain).

== Recreation ==
It is possible to hike to the summit of Mount Hereford via the Neil Tillotson Hiking Trail, which is a 12 kilometres (7.5 mi) long linear trail. It is accessible from either Clowery Road in Saint-Herménégilde or Coaticook Road in East Hereford. Other permitted activities include snowshoeing, cross-country skiing, and wildlife observation.
