= Mont Sainte-Cécile =

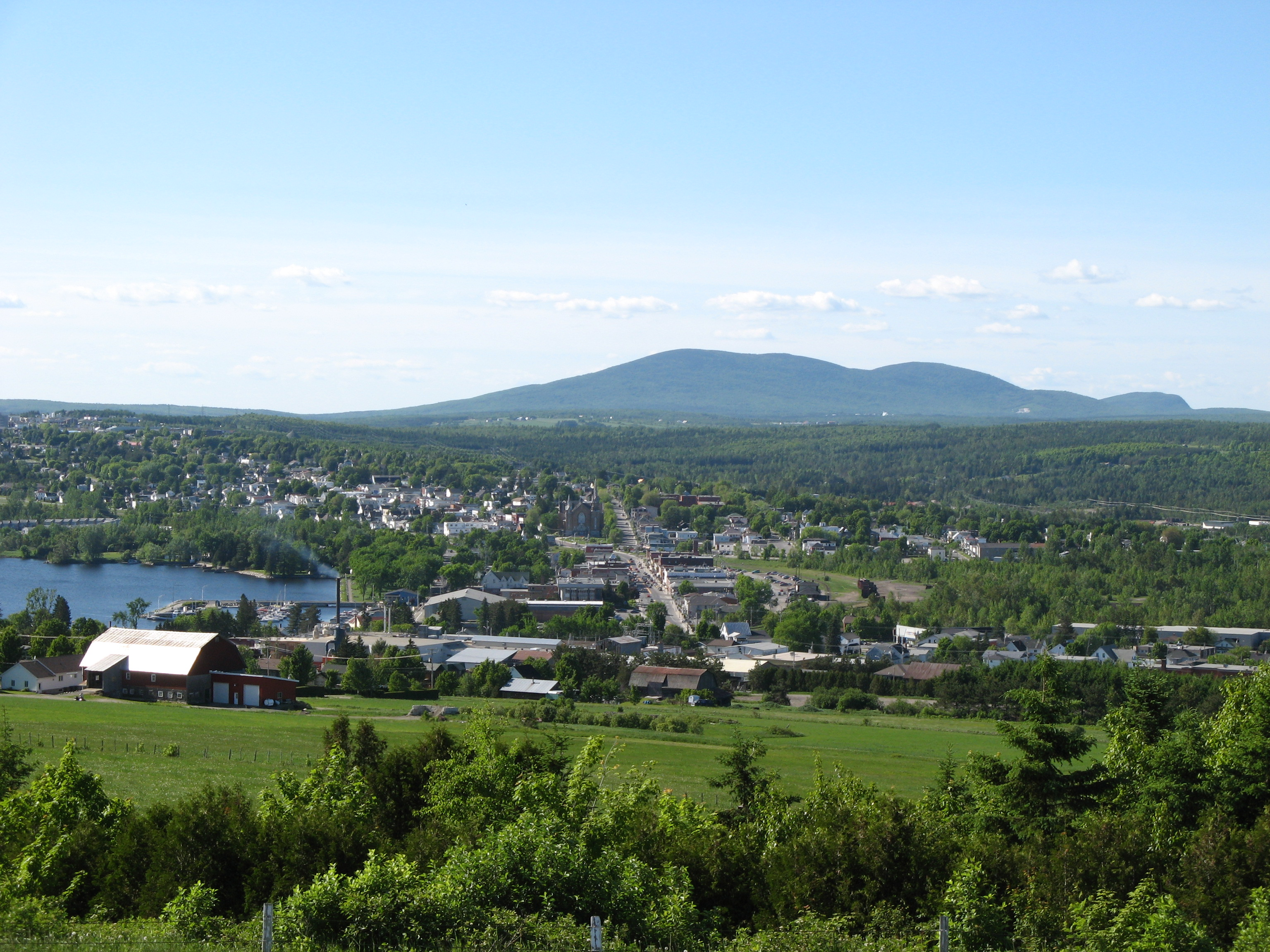
- The village of Lac-Mégantic with Mont Sainte-Cécile in the background

Highest point
- Elevation: 887 m (2,910 ft)
- Isolation: 26.36 km (26,360 m)
- Coordinates: 45°41′52″N 70°57′46″W

Geography
- Location within Southern Quebec
- Location: Quebec, Canada
- Parent range: Longfellow Mountains
- Topo map: NTS 21E10 Lac-Mégantic

Mont Sainte-Cécile, also referred to as Petit-Mégantic is a mountain that rises to 887 m (2,910 ft) located in Sainte-Cécile-de-Whitton, Quebec, Canada.

== Etymology ==
Mont Sainte-Cécile and the eponymous village at its foot were named after Saint Cecilia.

== Geography ==
The mountain is located in the municipality of Sainte-Cécile-de-Whitton, Quebec in the regional county municipality of Le Granit. It lies in the boundary ranges of the Longfellow Mountains in the Appalachians and on the edge of the Chaudière River valley.

=== Geology ===
Mont Sainte-Cécile is made of granodiorite that dates from the upper Devonian period (382.31 million years ago). To its southeast, where it collects water and drains into the Chaudière River, is the Drolet lens, a clayey till that was settled in the valley during the massive drainage of Glacial Lake Gayhurst when it filled an overdeepening with remnants of glacial lacustrine deposits.

Granit is currently being extracted from the eastern flank of the mountain.

== Wildlife ==
Pseudevernia cladonia, also known as "ghost antler lichen" or petits bois, a species of lichen with the designation of "special concern," is estimated to be found on the mountain

== Recreation ==
The mountain does not currently have any recreo-touristic layout. A hiking trail stretching from its base to the summit had been planned, but the promoters of the trail did not succeed in getting permission from the landowners to construct a crucial part of the trail, so the project has been put aside.
