= Mount Defiance (New Jersey) =

Mountain in New Jersey, United States

Highest point
- Elevation: 1,040 ft (320 m) NGVD 29
- Coordinates: 41°07′26″N 74°13′46″W

Geography
- Location: Passaic County, New Jersey, U.S.
- Parent range: Ramapo Mountains
- Topo map: USGS Ramsey

Climbing
- Easiest route: Hike

Mount Defiance is a mountain in Ringwood State Park in Passaic County, New Jersey. The peak rises to 1,040 feet (317 m). It is part of the Ramapo Mountains.
