= Drag Hill =

Highest point
- Elevation: 1,060 ft (320 m) NGVD 29
- Coordinates: 41°05′53″N 74°12′34″W

Geography
- Location: Bergen County, New Jersey, United States
- Parent range: Ramapo Mountains
- Topo map: USGS Ramsey

Climbing
- Easiest route: Hike

Drag Hill is a mountain in Bergen County, New Jersey. The peak rises to 1,060 feet (323 m), and overlooks Bear Swamp Lake to the west. It is part of the Ramapo Mountains.

Drag Hill is part of Ringwood State Park.
