= High Mountain (Ramapo Mountains) =

Mountain in New Jersey, United States

Highest point
- Elevation: 1,106 ft (337 m) NGVD 29
- Coordinates: 41°05′19″N 74°14′07″W

Geography
- Location: Bergen County, New Jersey, U.S.
- Parent range: Ramapo Mountains
- Topo map: USGS Ramsey

Climbing
- Easiest route: Hike

High Mountain is a mountain on the Bergen and Passaic county line, New Jersey. The peak rises to 1,106 feet (337 m). It is part of the Ramapo Mountains, and is not to be confused with the like-named High Mountain in the Preakness Range of the Watchung Mountains. High Mountain is partially within Ringwood State Park.
