= Mont Xalibu =

Mountain in Canada

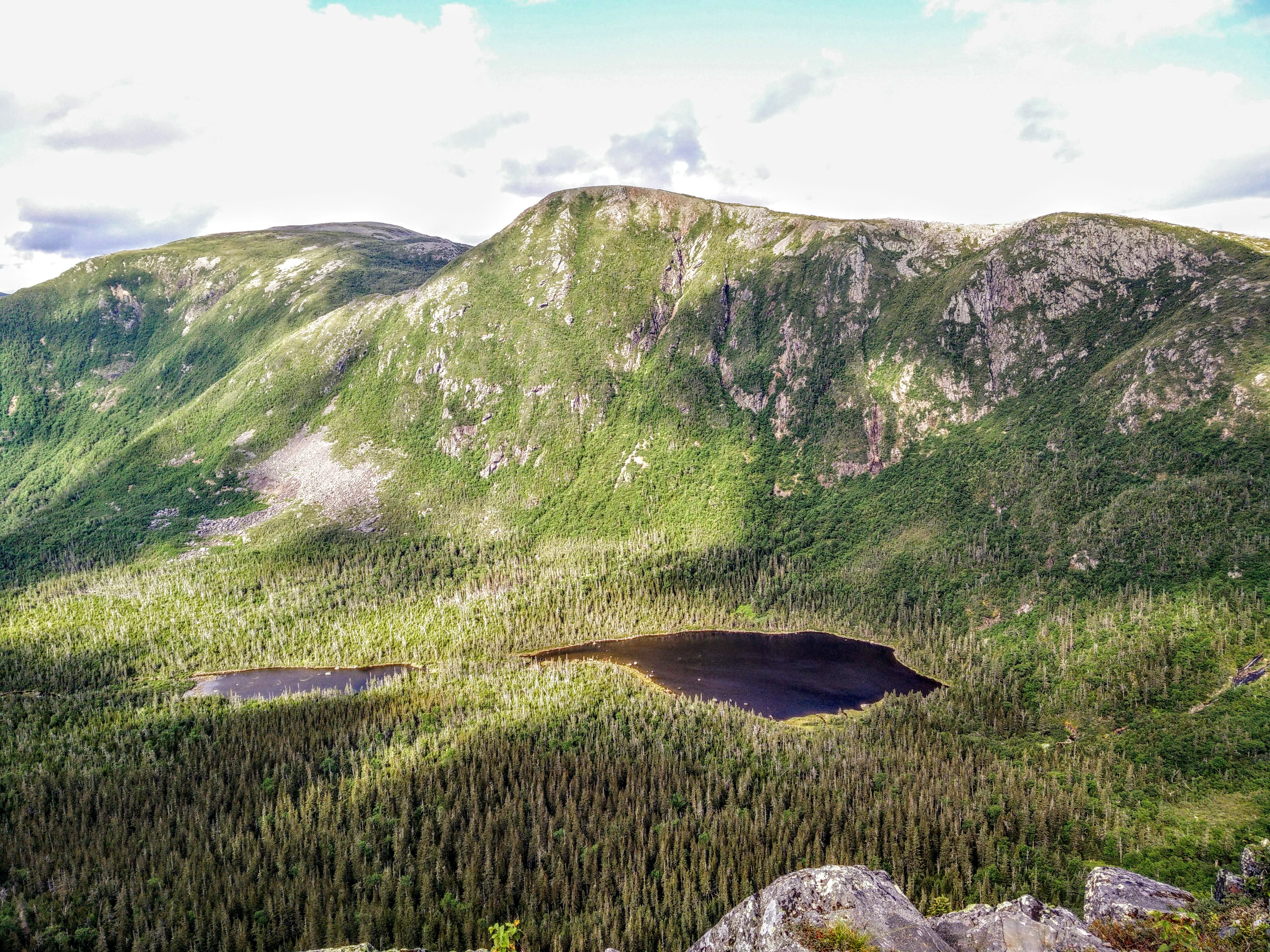
- View of Mount Xalibu from Mount Joseph-Fortin.

Highest point
- Elevation: 1,120 m (3,670 ft)
- Parent peak: Monts McGerrigle (Chic-Choc Mountains, Notre Dame Mountains, Appalachian Mountains)
- Coordinates: 48°57′51″N 66°00′42″W

Geography
- Location within Quebec
- Interactive map of Mont Xalibu
- Country: Canada
- Province: Quebec
- Administrative region: Gaspésie–Îles-de-la-Madeleine
- Topo map: NTS 22B16 Mont Albert

Geology
- Rock age: About 400 million years (13,000 Ts)
- Mountain type: Cirque glaciaire
- Rock type(s): Skarn, cornéenne

Mount Xalibu is a mountain located in the unorganized territory of Mont-Albert, in Quebec. Culminating at 1,120 metres (3,670 ft) above sea level, it is one of the highest peaks in the Notre Dame Mountains. It is located in Gaspésie National Park.

== Toponymy ==
The mountain, without official designation until 2 February 1989, was given the Mi'kmaq name of an animal that inhabits its flanks, the woodland caribou.

== Geography ==
=== Situation ===
Mount Xalibu is located in eastern Canada, in the province of Quebec, on the northern flank of the Gaspé Peninsula. It is 40 kilometres (25 mi) southeast of the town of Sainte-Anne-des-Monts, capital of La Haute-Gaspésie Regional County Municipality, and 450 kilometres (280 mi) northeast of Quebec, provincial capital. The summit rises to 1,120 metres (3,670 ft) of altitude in the McGerrigle Mountains, within the Chic-Choc Mountains of the Notre-Dame range.

=== Topography ===
Mount Xalibu is part of the McGerrigle Mountains, formerly called Tabletop (“table top”) because of their constitution in plateaus which surmount steep rock faces.

=== Geology ===
About 400 million years ago, during the Devonian, an intrusion granite was inserted into the rocks sedimentary Paleozoic that form the current Gaspé Peninsula. The summit of Xalibu develops around this batholith. The southern flank of the mountain constitutes one of the walls of the glacial cirque of "Lac aux Américains".

=== Climate ===
There is no station providing continuous climate data at the top of Mount Xalibu; a nearby station makes it possible to establish climatic normals.

Episodes of rain, melting conditions, the formation of ice shells and numerous snowstorms during the winter combine the conditions conducive to the formation of avalanches, common on the walls of the mountain.

The prevailing winds are from the west. At 12 kilometres (7.5 mi) west of Xalibu, on Mount Albert, (Note: Similar in altitude and latitude to Mount Xalibu.) winds average at 24 kilometres per hour (15 mph). Gusts of 250 kilometres per hour (160 mph) have already been recorded there.

=== Fauna and flora ===
The mountain is populated by the last herd of caribou south of the St. Lawrence River.

The Gaspésie woodland caribou (Rangifer tarandus caribou) inhabiting the area constitute the only population of their species south of the St. Lawrence River and have been listed as Endangered on Schedule 1 of Canada's Species at Risk Act since 2004. The population has experienced a prolonged decline: from an estimated minimum of 750 individuals in the 1950s, numbers fell to fewer than 100 individuals by the time of the most recent amended recovery strategy. Primary threats to the herd include predation by coyotes and black bears, logging in surrounding areas, and recreational disturbance on the mountain summits.

== History ==
Gaspésie National Park, within which Mount Xalibu is located, was created in April 1937 with the explicit goal of protecting the Gaspé caribou, preserving the ecosystems of Mont Albert and the McGerrigle Mountains, and conserving salmon populations in the Sainte-Anne River. It was the third provincial park established by Quebec, and its creation was directly motivated by the declining caribou herd.

== Activities ==
=== Winter ===
In order to promote the reproduction of woodland caribou, visiting the mountain in winter is strictly prohibited.

=== Summer ===
It is possible to do the ascent of Mount Xalibu when the ground is clear of snow, from the end of June to the end of September, by the International Appalachian Trail from the lake to the Americans, to the west, or from Mont Jacques-Cartier, to the east. In order to shorten the route, it is also possible to take a shuttle from Mont Albert.

=== Protection status ===
The mountain is included in Gaspésie National Park, at the limit of Chic-Chocs Wildlife Reserve.

== See also ==
- Geography of Quebec
- List of mountains of Quebec
