= Rocky Mountain (New Jersey) =

Mountain in New Jersey, United States

Highest point
- Elevation: 1,056 ft (322 m) NGVD 29
- Coordinates: 41°05′30″N 74°12′55″W

Geography
- Location: Bergen County, New Jersey, U.S.
- Parent range: Ramapo Mountains
- Topo map: USGS Ramsey

Climbing
- Easiest route: Hike

Rocky Mountain is a mountain in Bergen County, New Jersey. The peak rises to 1,056 feet (322 m), and overlooks Bear Swamp Lake to the northwest. It is part of the Ramapo Mountains. Rocky Mountain is part of Ringwood State Park.
