= Forkston Mountain =

Mountain in Pennsylvania, United States

Coordinates: 41.51199°N 76.07166°W

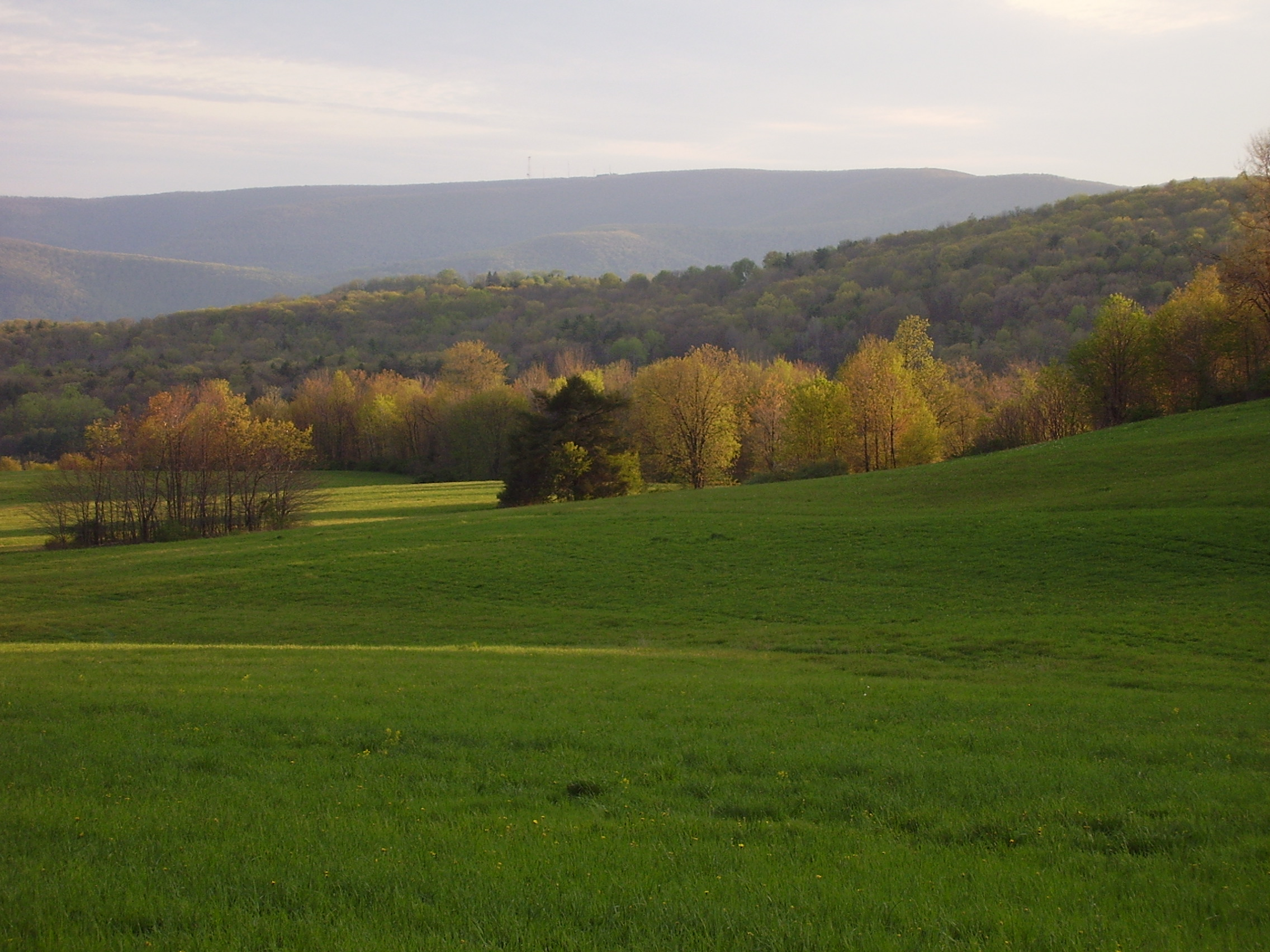
- Forkston Mountain

Highest point
- Elevation: 2,369 ft (722 m)

Geography
- Location: Wyoming County, Pennsylvania, U.S.
- Parent range: Appalachian Mountains
- Topo map: USGS Meshoppen (PA) Quadrangle

Forkston Mountain is a mountain located in Wyoming County, Pennsylvania. This mountain is located in the region of Pennsylvania known as the Endless Mountains. Forkston Mountain is a part of the Allegheny Plateau and rises over the Susquehanna River. Forkston Mountain has a fire tower located at the summit.
