= Franey Mountain =

Mountain in Nova Scotia, Canada

- Location within Nova Scotia

Highest point
- Elevation: 430 m (1,410 ft)
- Prominence: 80 m (260 ft)
- Coordinates: 46°40′45″N 60°29′31″W

Geography
- Location: Victoria County, Nova Scotia, Canada
- Parent range: Cape Breton Highlands
- Topo map: NTS 11K9 Ingonish

Climbing
- Easiest route: Hike

Franey Mountain is located in Victoria County, in the Canadian province of Nova Scotia, within Cape Breton Highlands National Park. Franey Mountain is part of the Cape Breton Highlands plateau and is located 4.5 kilometres (2.8 mi) west of Ingonish, Cape Breton Island. The elevation of the mountain is 430 metres (1,410 ft). It is the highpoint of the massif between Dundas Brook and Clyburn Brook.

== Hiking ==
The mountain can be accessed by a hiking trail which leads to the summit, offering views over the open ocean from Cape Smokey in the east to Money Point in the north, with the Middle Head Peninsula jutting out into the Atlantic directly below. A dramatic view of the mountains, the sheer rocky face of Franey Mountain, and the Clyburn Brook winding through the valley, 425 metres (1,394 ft) below. The highpoint of the mountain can be difficult to locate as the summit is broad and flat.
