= Petticoat Hill =

Hill in Massachusetts, United States

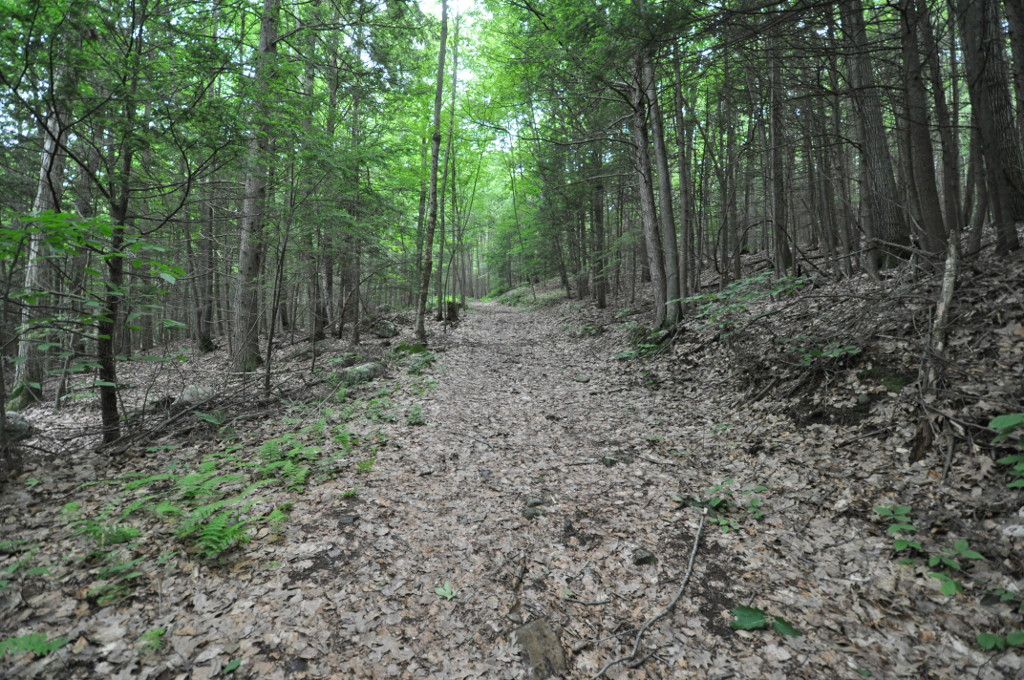
- A trail in the reservation

Highest point
- Elevation: 1,180 ft (360 m)
- Coordinates: 42°22′54″N 72°44′41″W

Geography
- Location: Williamsburg, Massachusetts, United States
- Parent range: The Berkshires

Climbing
- Easiest route: Loop trail to Scott Hill (subordinate summit)

Petticoat Hill
- Interactive map of Petticoat Hill
- Established: 1906
- Operator: The Trustees of Reservations
- Website: Petticoat Hill

Petticoat Hill is the name of a 1,180 foot (361 m) hill and a 60-acre (24 ha) open space reservation located in Williamsburg, Massachusetts in the eastern Berkshire Mountains. The reservation, occupying the east side of the hill, is managed by The Trustees of Reservations (TTOR), a non-profit conservation organization. The hill and reservation are characterized by steep slopes largely wooded with northern hardwood forest species, particularly eastern hemlock.

== Geography and ecology ==
Petticoat Hill rises nearly 1,000 feet (300 m) above downtown Williamsburg; its subordinate summits include Scott Hill, 1,027 ft (313 m), on which are located the reservation and trails; and Unquomonk Hill, (1,083 ft (330 m). The east and south sides of Petticoat Hill drain into Unquomonk Brook, thence into the Mill River, the Connecticut River, and Long Island Sound. The north and west sides of the hill drain into Meekin Brook, thence into the Mill River.

Petticoat Hill species include American black bear, coyote, and white-tailed deer. Flora includes spring wildflowers such as red trillium, trout lily, white baneberry, and wild ginger. Tree species include American basswood, black birch, hornbeam, Northern red oak, pignut hickory, shagbark hickory, red maple, sugar maple, white ash, and white pine. There are trees on the property that are over 100 feet (30 m) tall and some that are 10 feet (3.0 m) in diameter or more.

== History ==
Petticoat Hill receives its name from a family of seven daughters, who, according to local tradition, lived on the hill and regularly hung their petticoats from a laundry line where they "wave[ed] in the wind [and were] visible for miles around when they did their laundry on Mondays."

By the early 19th century, the area around Petticoat Hill was the most populated section of Williamsburg. The current reservation property, except for a field of boulders, was mostly sheep pasture. When farming interests moved to the Midwest by the late 1800s, the hill gradually reverted to forest. Old stone walls, foundations, and cellar holes are the only remains of the hill's former use.

The east side of Petticoat Hill was donated to The Trustees of Reservations in 1906 by Mrs. Edward W. Nash in memory of her husband. Additional land was donated in 1924.

== Recreation ==
The Petticoat Hill reservation is open to hiking, cross country skiing, picnicking, and hunting (in season); TTOR manages a 1.5-mile (2.4 km) loop trail through the property. Another trail, Locke's Loop, is managed by the local non-profit Williamsburg Woodland Trails organization with permission from private landowners; it joins the reservation hiking trail near the summit of Scott Hill, passes over the crest, and descends through private property before returning to the reservation. No marked trails ascend to the actual summit of Petticoat Hill.
