= Mount Cliche =

Mountain in Estrie, Quebec, Canada

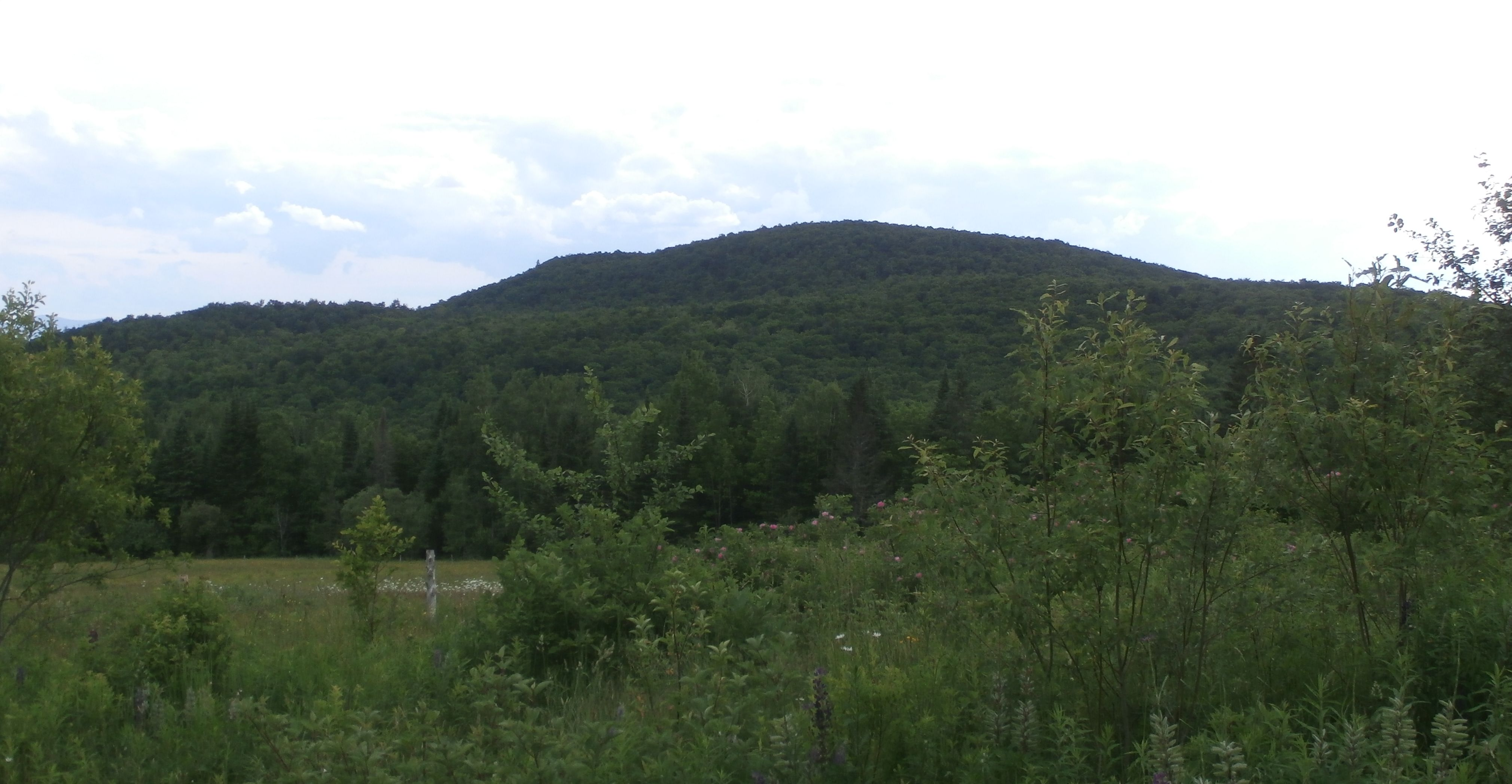
- View of Mont Cliche.

Highest point
- Peak: 693 metres (2,274 ft)
- Parent peak: White Mountains (Appalachian Mountains)
- Coordinates: 45°31′26″N 70°48′10″W

Geography
- Location: Estrie
- Country: Canada
- Province: Québec
- Region: Region

Mount Cliche is a mountain in Le Granit Regional County Municipality, in administrative region of Estrie, Quebec, in Canada. It is part of Appalachian Mountains; its altitude is 693 metres (2,274 ft).

== Geography ==
The mountain is located in range 4 which leads to lac aux Araignées in the municipality of Frontenac.

== Toponymy ==
The toponym "Mont Cliche" was formalized on December 5, 1968 by the Commission de toponymie du Québec.
