= Mont Foster =

Mountain in the Estrie region of Quebec

Highest point
- Elevation: 701 metres (2,300 ft)
- Coordinates: 45.23°N 72.398056°W

Geography
- Country: Canada
- Province: Quebec
- Administrative region: Estrie
- Regional County Municipality: Memphrémagog
- Parent range: Monts Sutton

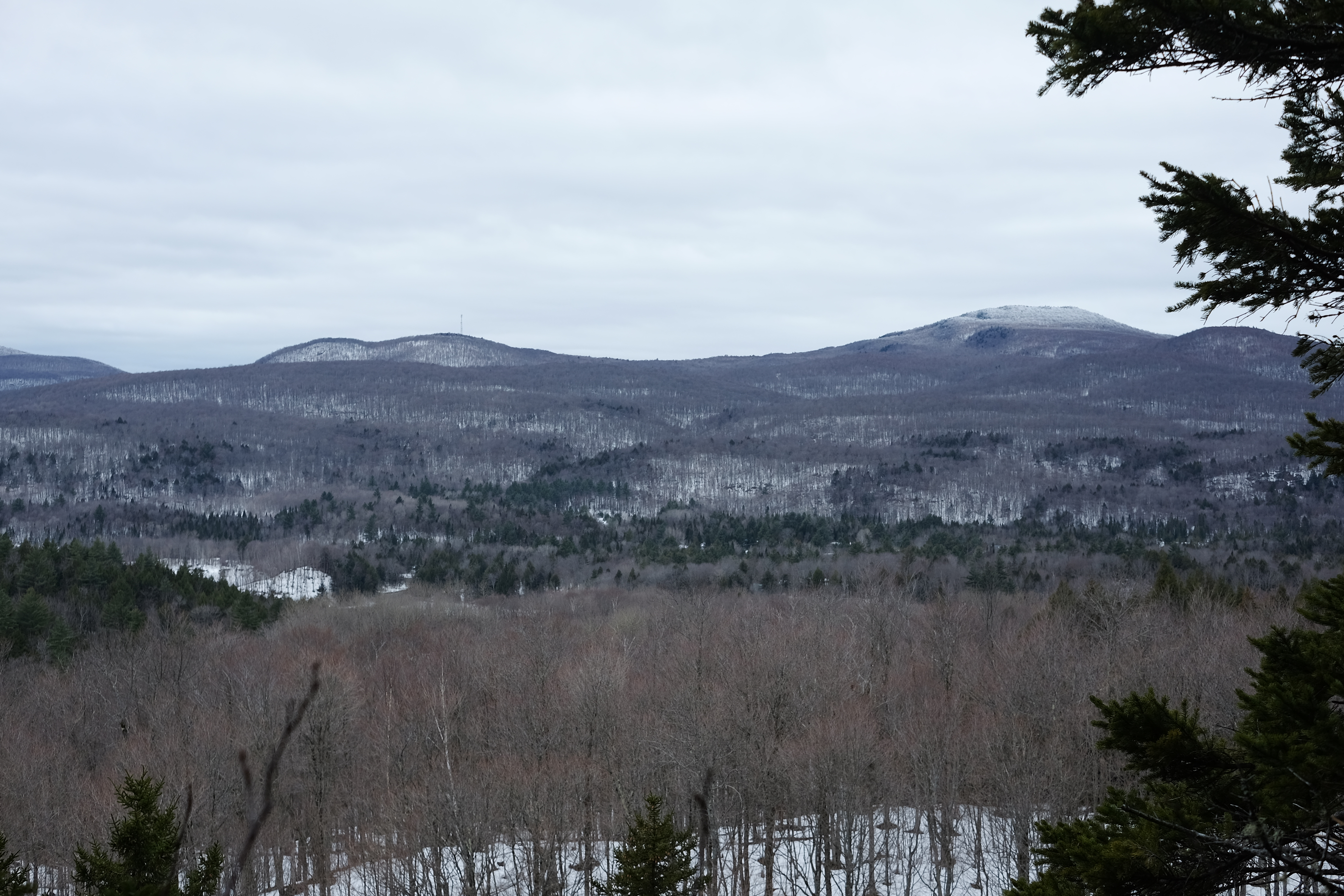

Mont Foster is a mountain of the Appalachian Mountains range, located in the municipality of Saint-Étienne-de-Bolton, Quebec.

== See also ==
- List of mountains of Quebec
