= Humpback Mountain (North Carolina) =

Mountain in North Carolina, United States

- Location within North Carolina

Highest point
- Elevation: 4,245 ft (1,294 m)
- Coordinates: 35°56′40″N 81°57′42″W

Geography
- Location: Avery County, North Carolina, U.S.
- Parent range: Blue Ridge Mountains
- Topo map: USGS Linville Falls

Humpback Mountain is a mountain in the North Carolina High Country and the Pisgah National Forest, located southwest of Linville Falls. The mountain is accessible along the Blue Ridge Parkway, which ride along its eastern slope. The peak reaches an elevation of 4,245 feet (1,294 m), in Avery County; while the overall mountain is also in McDowell County. Two ridges, Mill Ridge and Dividing Ridge, form from the western side of the mountain.

Split by the Eastern Continental Divide, the mountain generates feeder streams to the North Fork Catawba River on its eastern slopes and to the North Toe River on its western slopes.

== Land conservancy ==
On December 5, 2013, the Conservation Trust of North Carolina purchased 523 acres (2.12 km^{2}) along the Blue Ridge Parkway for $2.5 million, most of which is on Humpback Mountain. The property will eventually be transferred over to the North Carolina Wildlife Resources Commission to own and manage.
