= Longfellow Mountains =

Subrange of the Appalachian Mountains in Canada and the United States

The Longfellow Mountains (French: Montagnes Longfellow) are a subrange of the Appalachian Mountains System, located within the North Maine Woods region of northwestern Maine. They extend across the state from northern New Hampshire northeastward to the Canadian provinces of New Brunswick and Quebec.

In 1959, the Maine Legislature voted to give names to the various mountains and ranges in northwest Maine. The collective name of the Longfellow Mountains is in honor of the Maine-born poet Henry Wadsworth Longfellow (1807–1882).

This and most of Maine's mountain ranges and mountain peaks are part of the Appalachian Mountains System.

== See also ==
- List of mountains of Maine
- List of subranges of the Appalachian Mountains
- North Maine Woods topics
