= Notre Dame Mountains =

Portion of the Appalachian Mountains in Quebec and Vermont

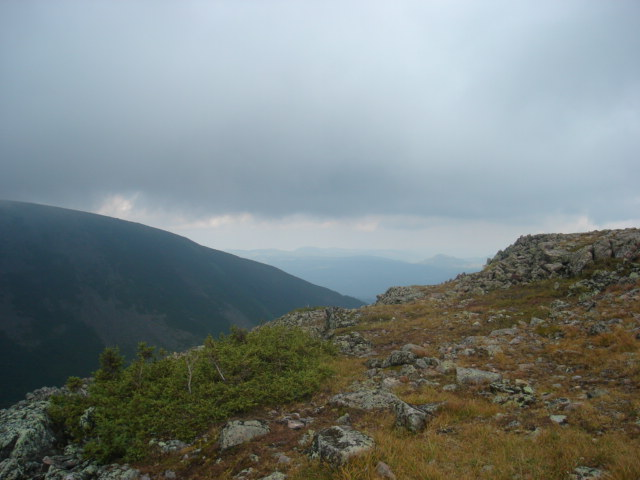
- The Chic-Choc Mountains subrange on the Gaspé Peninsula

Geography
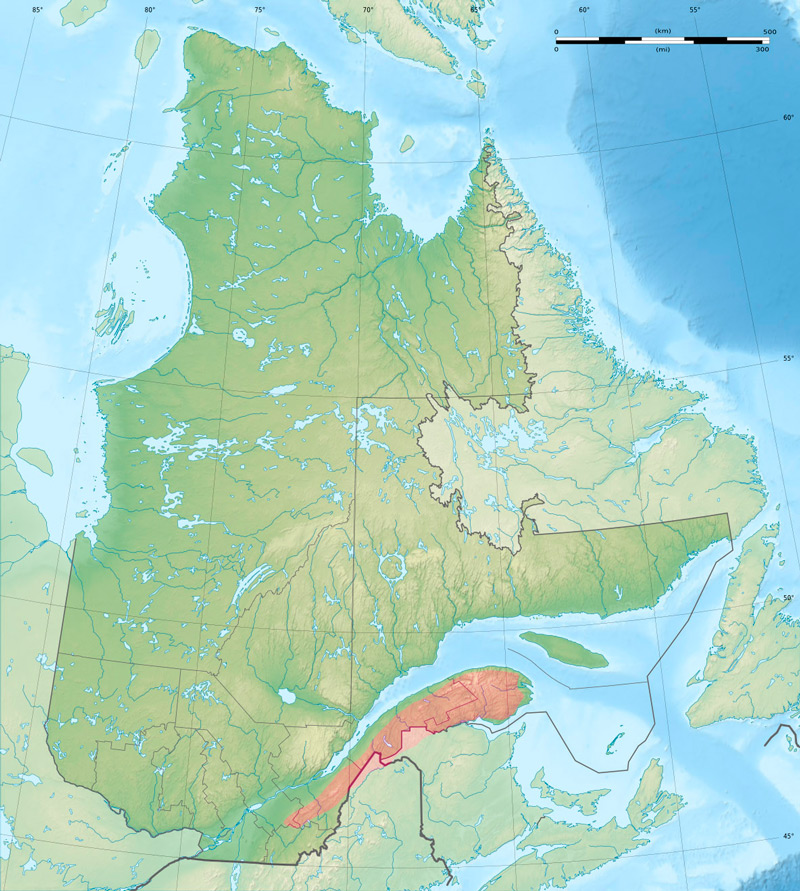
- Location of the Notre Dame Mountains
- Countries: Canada; United States
- States/Provinces: Canada: Quebec, New Brunswick; United States: Maine, New Hampshire, Vermont
- Range coordinates: 48°45′N 66°00′W
- Parent range: Appalachian Mountains

The Notre Dame Mountains are a portion of the Appalachian Mountains, extending from the Gaspé Peninsula of Quebec to the Green Mountains of Vermont.

The range runs from northeast to southwest, forming the southern edge of the St. Lawrence River valley, and following the Canada–United States border between Quebec and Maine. The mountainous New Brunswick "panhandle" is located in the Notre Dame range as well as the uppermost reaches of the Connecticut River valley in New Hampshire.

The geologically old mountains have eroded to an average height of around 600 m (2,000 ft).

== Etymology ==
Notre Dame is French for "Our Lady," a Catholic term referring to the Virgin Mary.

While on an expedition on 15 August 1535, Jacques Cartier wrote:

Le landemain jour Notre Dame d'aoust XVe ... eusmes cognoissance de terres qui nous demouroient vers le su qui est une terre à haultes montaignes à merveilles

The jour Notre Dame d'aoust XVe refers to the feast of the Assumption of Mary, commemorated in the Catholic Church on 15 August. The following autumn, maps he authored carried the name "haultes montaignes de Honguedo." However, it was the title of "Notre Dame" that would propagate quickly throughout the 16th century, with French navigator Jean Alfonse referring to them as the "montz Nostre Dame" in his 1544 work Cosmographie, followed by Gerardus Mercator in 1569.

== Geography ==
=== Topography ===
The Notre Dame Mountains are the principal subrange of the Appalachian Mountains in Quebec. Within Quebec, the range parallels the St. Lawrence River until its terminus at the eastern end of the Gaspé Peninsula. However, the southern limit of the range is the subject of some debate, though some sources consider either Lake Memphremagog or the US border as the southern edge of the Notre Dame Mountains.

The Chic-Choc Mountains are one of the primary subranges of the Notre Dame Mountains. They are located in the northeastern part of the Gaspé Peninsula and are home to the tallest mountain in the range, Mont Jacques-Cartier, with an elevation of 1,268 m (4,160 ft). The other major subsection of the Notre Dame Mountains is the Massif du Sud, which is found in the southern part of the range, southeast of Quebec City, and reaches an elevation of 915 m (3,002 ft).

=== Geology ===
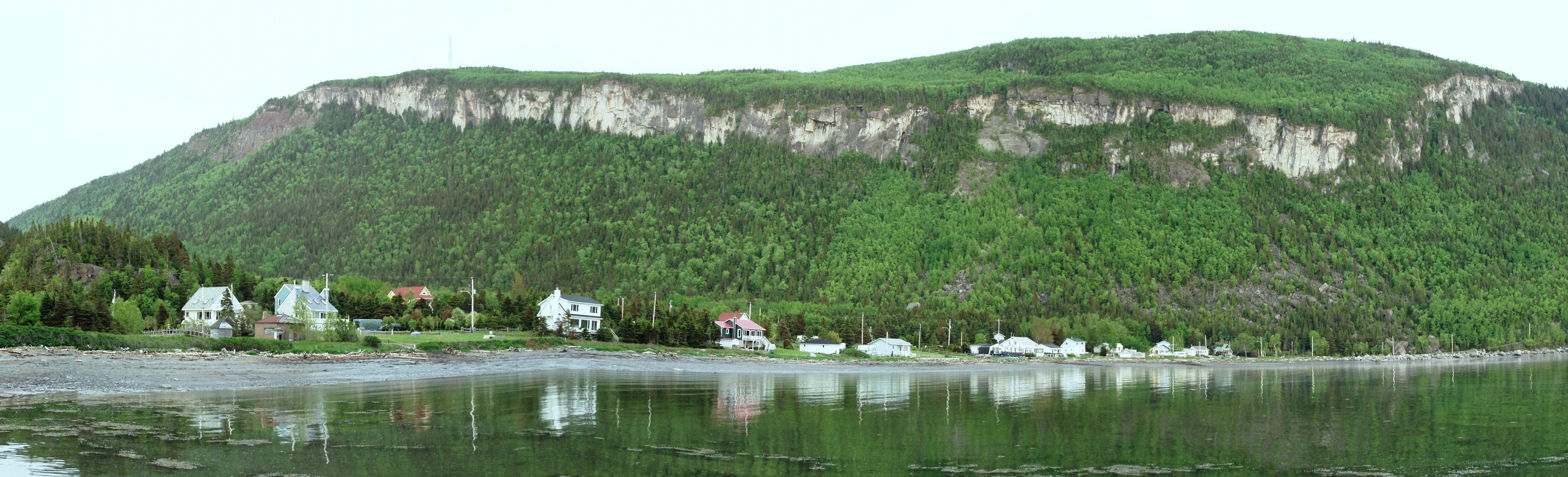
Champlain Peak in Bic National Park

The Notre Dame Mountains formed 440 million years ago as part of the Canadian Appalachian Uplands physiographic region, and lie within the deformed Laurentian-margin rocks of the Humber zone. In southern Quebec, the Notre Dame Mountains anticlinorium is described as a regional structural and metamorphic dome within the internal Humber zone, exposing some of the higher-grade metamorphic rocks in the region. The rocks record Taconian deformation, including northeast-southwest schistosity, synmetamorphic folding, later crenulation cleavage, southeast-directed backthrusting, and normal faulting along the Saint Joseph Fault.

Geochronological data suggests both Middle Ordovician and Silurian cooling events. Muscovite Argon–argon dating$\ce{^{40}_{}Ar/^{39}_{}Ar}$ ages of about 468-461 Ma are interpreted as cooling after peak Taconian metamorphism, while ages of about 425-421 Ma from the Notre Dame Mountains anticlinorium have been linked to late Taconian backthrusting, normal faulting, and post-thickening extension. In the Gaspé Peninsula, related Appalachian rocks include rift-related Neoproterozoic to Cambrian metabasalts of the Shickshock Group. The range's surficial geology was shaped by Laurentide glaciation. In the Saint-Sylvestre area, till, ice-contact deposits, and glaciolacustrine sediments are associated with the highland Front morainic system along the north-facing flank of the mountains.

== Conservation ==
The Notre Dame Mountains are protected by several parks, both federally by Parks Canada and provincially by the Quebec Sépaq and New Brunswick:

- Forillon National Park
- Bic National Park
- Frontenac National Park
- Lake Témiscouata National Park
- Gaspésie National Park
- Mount Carleton Provincial Park

== See also ==
- List of subranges of the Appalachian Mountains
- Notre Dame and Mégantic Mountains
