= Mount Jacques-Cartier =

Mountain in Quebec, Canada

Mont Jacques-Cartier
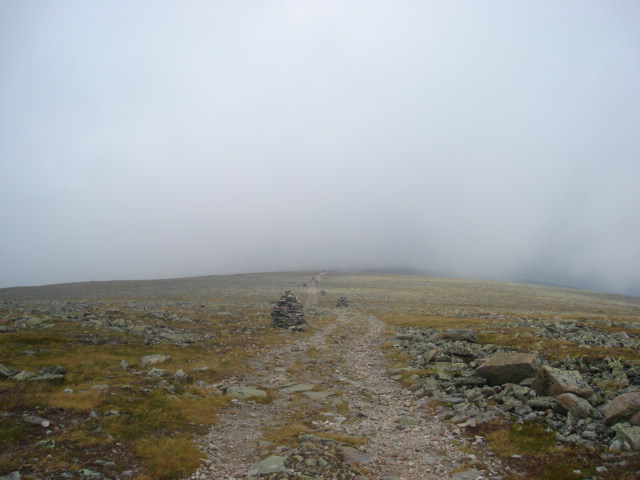
- Trail leading to the summit of the mountain.

Highest point
- Elevation: 1,277 m (4,190 ft)
- Prominence: 1,097 m (3,599 ft)
- Isolation: 406 km (252 mi)
- Listing: North America isolated peaks 47th; Canada most isolated peaks 16th; Quebec 1000 meter peaks
- Coordinates: 48°59′14″N 65°56′55″W

Geography
- Location within Quebec
- Location: Mont-Albert, Quebec, Canada
- Parent range: Chic-Choc Mountains
- Topo map: NTS 22A13 Lac Madeleine

Climbing
- Easiest route: hiking

Mount Jacques-Cartier (French: Mont Jacques-Cartier, pronounced [mɔ̃ ʒak kaʁtje]) is a mountain in the Chic-Choc Mountains range in eastern Quebec, Canada. At 1,268 m (4,160 ft), it is the tallest mountain in southern Quebec, the highest mountain in the Canadian Appalachians, and the most prominent mountain in Quebec. The mountain is named after Jacques Cartier, the French maritime explorer of North America.

Located in the Gaspé Peninsula, the mountain is protected within a Quebec provincial park called Gaspésie National Park, and is host to the last remaining population of woodland caribou south of the Saint Lawrence River. The summit can be accessed by a hiking trail.
