= Ramapo Mountains =

Mountain range in the northeastern US

Coordinates: 41.1723°N 74.1001°W

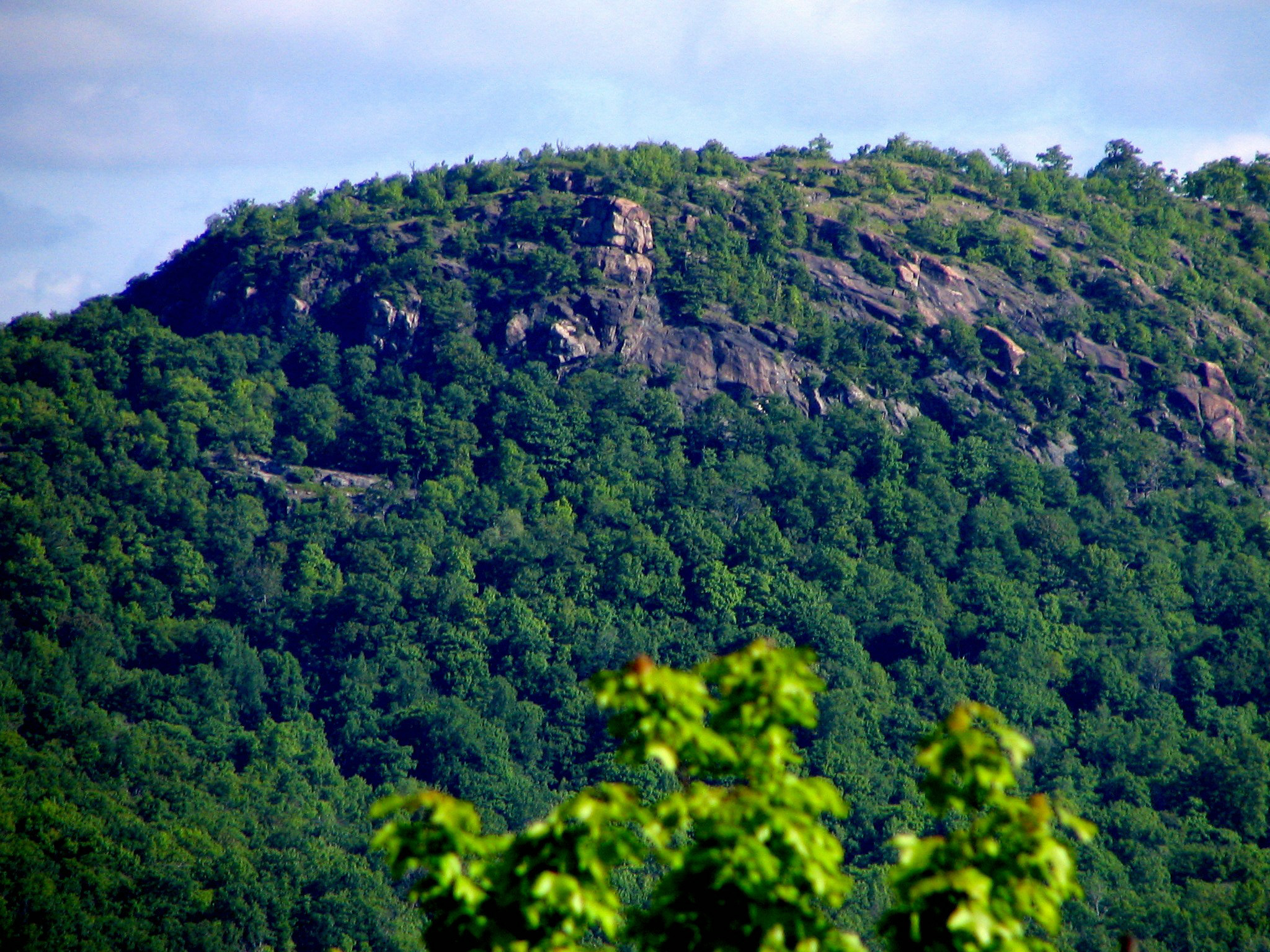
Ramapo Torne in Harriman State Park, part of the Ramapo Mountains

The Ramapo Mountains are a forested mountain range of the Appalachian Mountains located in northeastern New Jersey and southeastern New York in the United States. The range forms part of the New Jersey Highlands and is characterized by ancient Precambrian rock formations, extensive forests, reservoirs, and protected parklands. The mountains are closely associated with the Ramapo Fault zone and play an important role in regional watershed and groundwater systems.

== Geography ==
The Ramapo Mountains extend across portions of Bergen and Passaic counties in New Jersey and Rockland and Orange counties in New York. The range forms part of the larger Appalachian Highlands system and includes several parks, forests, reservoirs, and protected natural areas.

Large portions of the Ramapo Mountains are protected through a network of parks, forests, and conservation lands in both New Jersey and New York. Ramapo Mountain State Forest is a 4,200-acre (1,700 ha) protected area that forms part of a continuous system of public lands along the Ramapo Mountains, connecting to adjacent parks and reserves across state boundaries.

Ramapo Valley County Reservation is Bergen County's largest park area, covering 4,200 acres (1,700 ha) and preserving forest, wetland, and river ecosystems within the Ramapo River watershed.

Sterling Forest State Park, located in the New York portion of the Ramapo Mountains, encompasses more than 22,000 acres (8,900 ha) of protected land and represents one of the region's largest conservation areas.

Other protected areas associated with the Ramapo Mountains include Harriman State Park, Ringwood State Park, and Ramapo Valley County Reservation.

== Geology ==
The Ramapo Mountains are part of the Appalachian Highlands and are associated with the New Jersey Highlands physiographic province. The range is composed primarily of ancient Precambrian rocks including granite, gneiss, and marble formations that are estimated to be more than one billion years old.

The mountains are closely associated with the Ramapo Fault system, a major northeast–southwest trending fault zone separating the Piedmont region from the Highlands region.

The region was significantly shaped by glacial activity during the Pleistocene epoch. Valley-fill deposits consisting of glacial outwash, sand, gravel, till, and lacustrine sediments are found throughout the Ramapo River valley and surrounding lowlands.

== Conservation ==
Conservation organizations and local governments have worked to preserve undeveloped land within the Ramapo Mountains because of the region's ecological and watershed importance. According to the Trust for Public Land, thousands of acres have been preserved to protect wildlife habitats, forest ecosystems, scenic landscapes, and drinking water resources connected to the Ramapo River watershed.

The forests of the Ramapo Mountains provide habitat for wildlife including black bears, coyotes, foxes, hawks, osprey, and white-tailed deer.

== Points of interest ==
- Arden, the former E.H. Harriman estate built atop 1,300' Mt. Orana
- Bear Mountain State Park
- Doodletown, New York
- Harriman State Park
- Kakiat County Park
- Long Path
- Monksville Reservoir
- Ramapo Mountain State Forest
- Ramapo Valley County Reservation
- Ringwood Manor
- Ringwood State Park
- New Jersey State Botanical Garden
- Sterling Forest State Park
- Kitty Ann Mountain, New Jersey

== Flora and fauna ==
- Many types of plants, including oak trees, cover the mountains.
- Diverse wildlife, including white-tailed deer and pheasants, inhabit the Ramapo Mountains.

== In film ==
- Out of the Furnace

== See also ==
- List of subranges of the Appalachian Mountains
- Ramapo Valley County Reservation
- Ramapo Mountain State Forest
- Ramapo River
- Ramapough Mountain Indians
