= Discrete debris accumulation =

Discrete debris accumulation (DDA) is a non-genetic term in mountain glacial geology to aid identification of non-lithified sediments on a valley or mountain slope or floor. It is intended that the debris accumulation is discrete such that it can be mapped, in the field and/or from aerial or satellite imagery. The origin or formative process may well not be known clearly or be changed by subsequent investigators it is advisable to have a non-genetic field reference so that discussion can then be used to ascertain, if possible, the origin. Mountain areas may currently have glaciers (glacierized) or have had glaciers (glaciated) or be subject to forms of periglacial activity. A moraine would be an easily identified DDA as would an esker. Although scree (talus) is generally easily identified and mapped, these deposits may be modified by ice, avalanches or downslope movement to create essentially new landforms. Many small slope failures and landslides can give the appearance of moraines or protalus ramparts on slopes. After mapping as a DDA, further investigation might draw light on the origin of the feature.

The term was apparently first used by Sven Lukas for a very specific feature in Svalbard.

Independently, it was suggested in the literature in W. B. Whalley and subsequently in Whalley, 2012 as relating to the basic definition and usage as above. This book chapter provides several photographic examples.

The 'cirque infills' described by Hätterstrand et al. (2008) in the Khibiny Mountains, Kola Peninsula could be described as discrete debris accumulations, although their origin is postulated by these authors as being moraine remnants of an ice sheet pushing into these cirques rather than as rock glaciers formed within the cirques.

A recent term introduced by Brighenti et al. is 'Cold Rocky Landforms' (CRLs) as a more general term including landforms generally identified as: protalus ramparts, valley-wall rock glaciers, talus (or scree) slopes and 'ice-embedded' moraines. 'Structurally, CRLs have a surface mantle of rocky debris and interiors composed of ice and rock'. However, it is by no means clear that any CRL necessarily contains ice in any form. Ice would not be present in areas that have long since lost any ice, whether from glaciers or snowbanks such as in upland Britain, where DDAs, as difficult to map entities, are known to exist.
