= Emerald Lake (Mount Timpanogos Wilderness) =

Lake in the state of Utah, United States

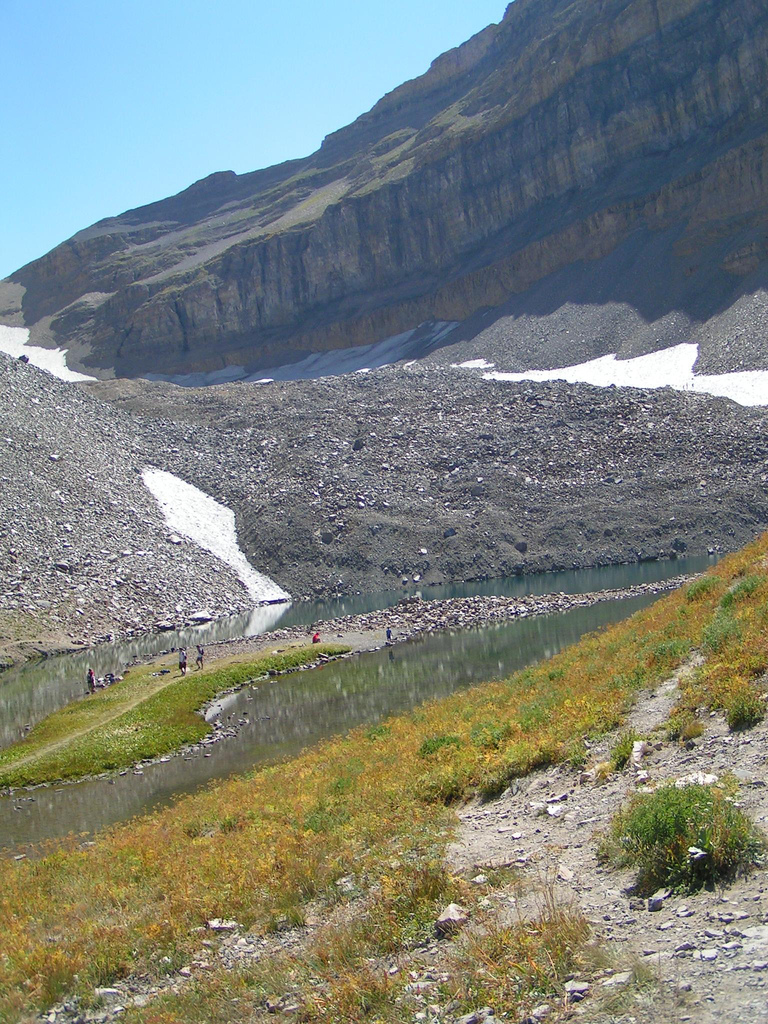
- Emerald Lake below the Timpanogos Glacier, August 2007

- Location within Utah Location within the United States
- Location: Mount Timpanogos Wilderness; Utah County, Utah, United States
- Coordinates: 40°23′35″N 111°38′23″W
- Type: proglacial lake
- Primary inflows: snowmelt and glacial runoff
- Primary outflows: unnamed stream (a tributary of North Fork Provo River)
- Basin countries: United States
- Surface elevation: 10,397 feet (3,169 m)

Emerald Lake is a small proglacial lake near the summit of Mount Timpanogos in the middle of the Mount Timpanogos Wilderness in the Wasatch Range in northeastern Utah County, Utah, United States.

== Description ==
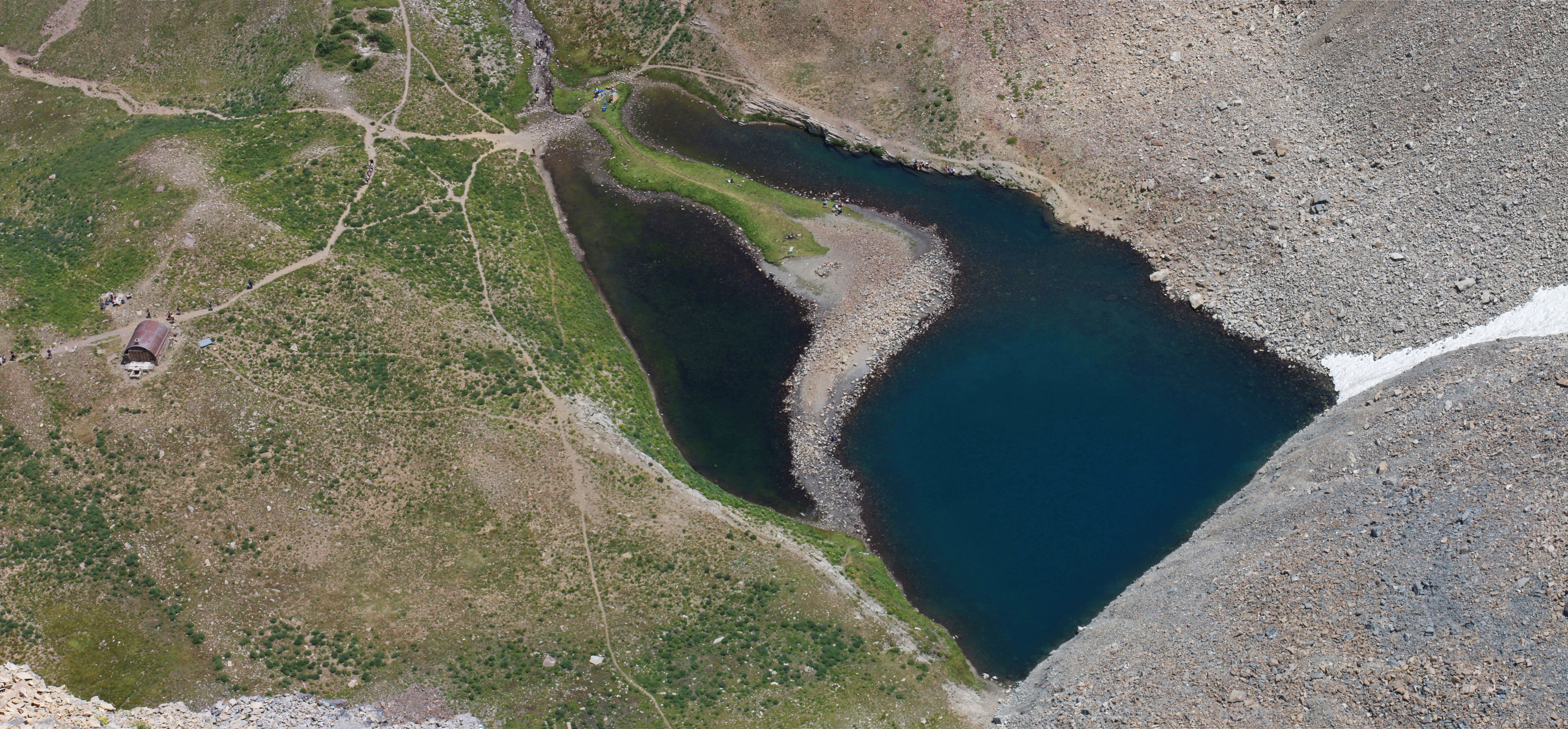
Emerald Lake, from the summit of Mount Timpanogos, August 2015

The lake is northeast of the summit of Mount Timpanogos, at the base of the almost vertical northeast face of the mountain, with an elevation of 10,397 feet (3,169 m). The now mostly vanished and completely buried Timpanogos Glacier left behind a terminal moraine which now impounds the lake. The runoff from the rock glacier feeds the lake and colors it blue. The lake is accessible by hiking, the Mount Timpanogos Trail (also known as the Aspen Grove Trail) from Aspen Grove being the fastest way to reach it. The lake is 6.9 miles (11.1 km) from the trailhead, or about two-thirds of the way up to the summit.

During summer weekends the Timpanogos Emergency Response Team (TERT) of the county sheriff's office stations volunteers at a camp near Emerald Lake to assist with emergency incidents that frequently occur on the mountain.

According to some versions of The Legend of Timpanogos, Emerald Lake is the immortalization of Red Eagle, after he fell to his death from the peak of Mount Timpanogos.

== See also ==
- List of lakes in Utah
