= The Snow Hole =

Mountain in United States of America

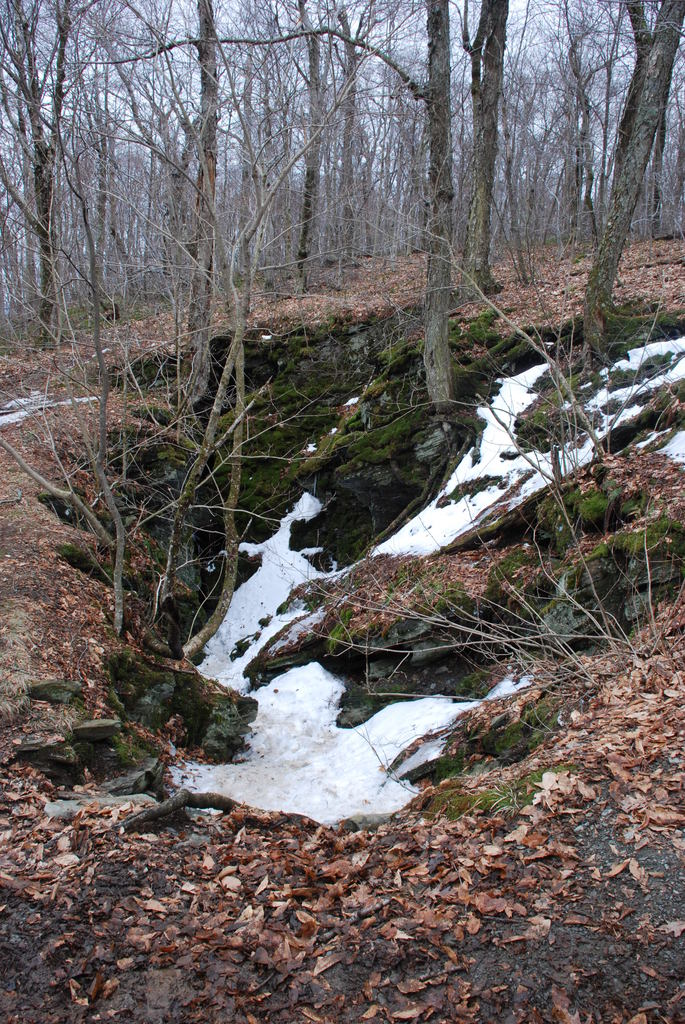
The snow hole

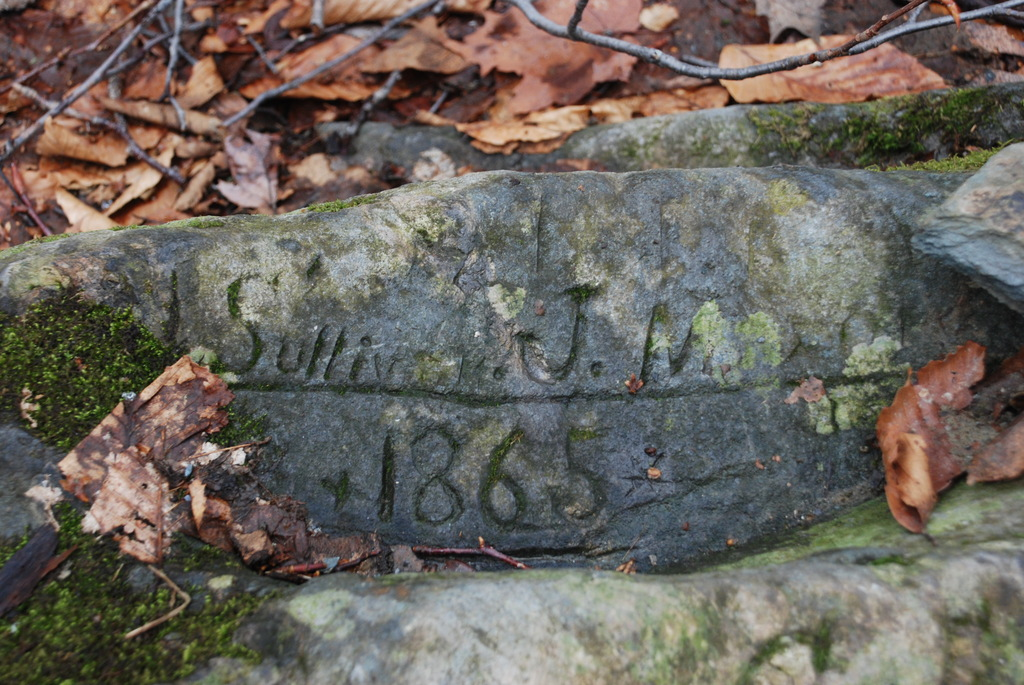
A carving from 1865

The Snow Hole is located in the Taconic Mountains, New York, USA along the ridge line between Bald Mountain and the White Rock. It is a crevasse in which snow can be found well into the summer. The Snow Hole can be accessed by hiking the Taconic Crest Trail about 2.75 miles north from the Petersburgh Pass parking area just off of Route 2. The Snow Hole is located at 42°45.538′N 73°16.840′W. Finding the location of the Snow Hole can be confusing, as several maps (including Google maps and USGS Berlin quadrangle, 1:25,000 scale - 1988) mark the location of the Snow Hole summit at 42.743671°N 73.275118°W. However, that is a separate mountain summit and not the actual Snow Hole. The posted hiking map at the kiosk to the Taconic Crest Trail at Petersburgh Pass has the location correctly identified. Typically the crevasse has snow at the bottom of it year round.

Numerous engravings in the rocks surrounding the Snow Hole include names and dates of visitors dating to the 19th century. The oldest carving found is from the early 19th century.

Other examples of persistent snow include the snow patches in Scotland. These areas are associated with a characteristic cold-loving flora and fauna and it is likely that the Snow Hole also served as a refugium for small ice age species. Both are examples of nivation hollows.
