= Timpanogos Glacier =

Glacier in Utah, United States

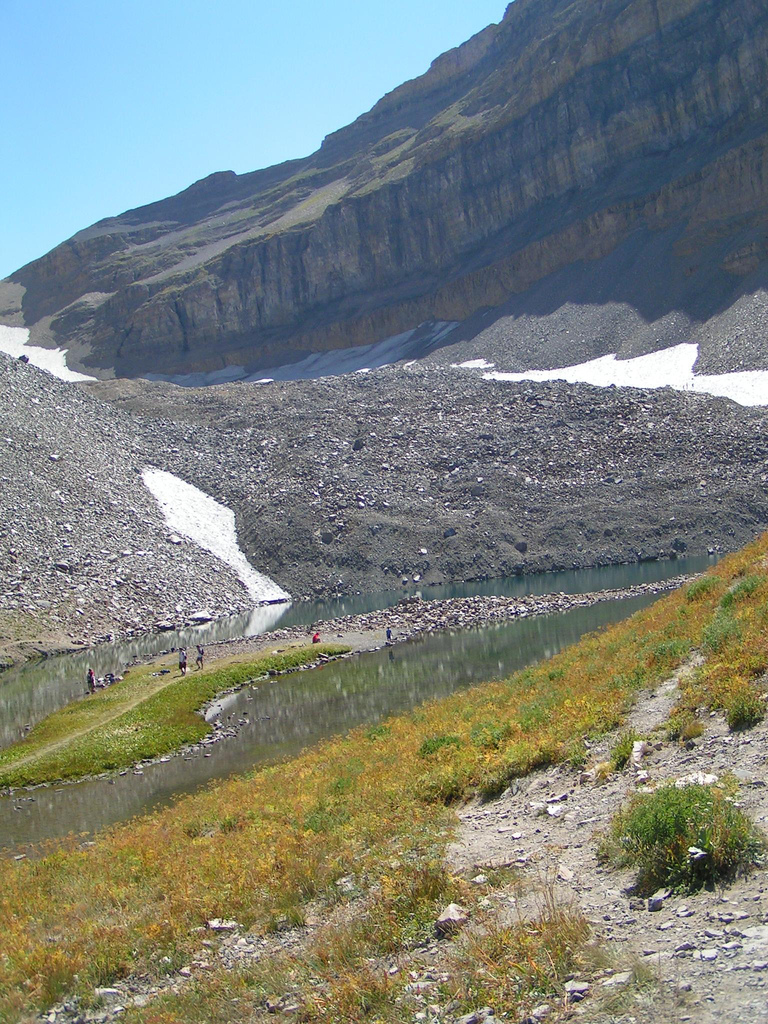
- Emerald Lake below the glacier (the bulge in the talus is where the glacier is buried), August 2007

- Location within Utah
- Type: Rock glacier
- Location: Utah County, Utah; United States
- Coordinates: 40°23′23.53″N 111°38′25.00″W
- Length: 0.5 km (0.31 mi)
- Thickness: 18.8 m (62 ft) (Average) 30–45 m (98–148 ft) (Centerline)
- Terminus: proglacial lake
- Status: Active

Timpanogos Glacier is a rock glacier located on Mount Timpanogos in the Wasatch Range within the Mount Timpanogos Wilderness (in the Uinta-Wasatch-Cache National Forest) in northeastern Utah County, Utah, United States. It is one of 834 known rock glaciers in the state of Utah.

== Description ==
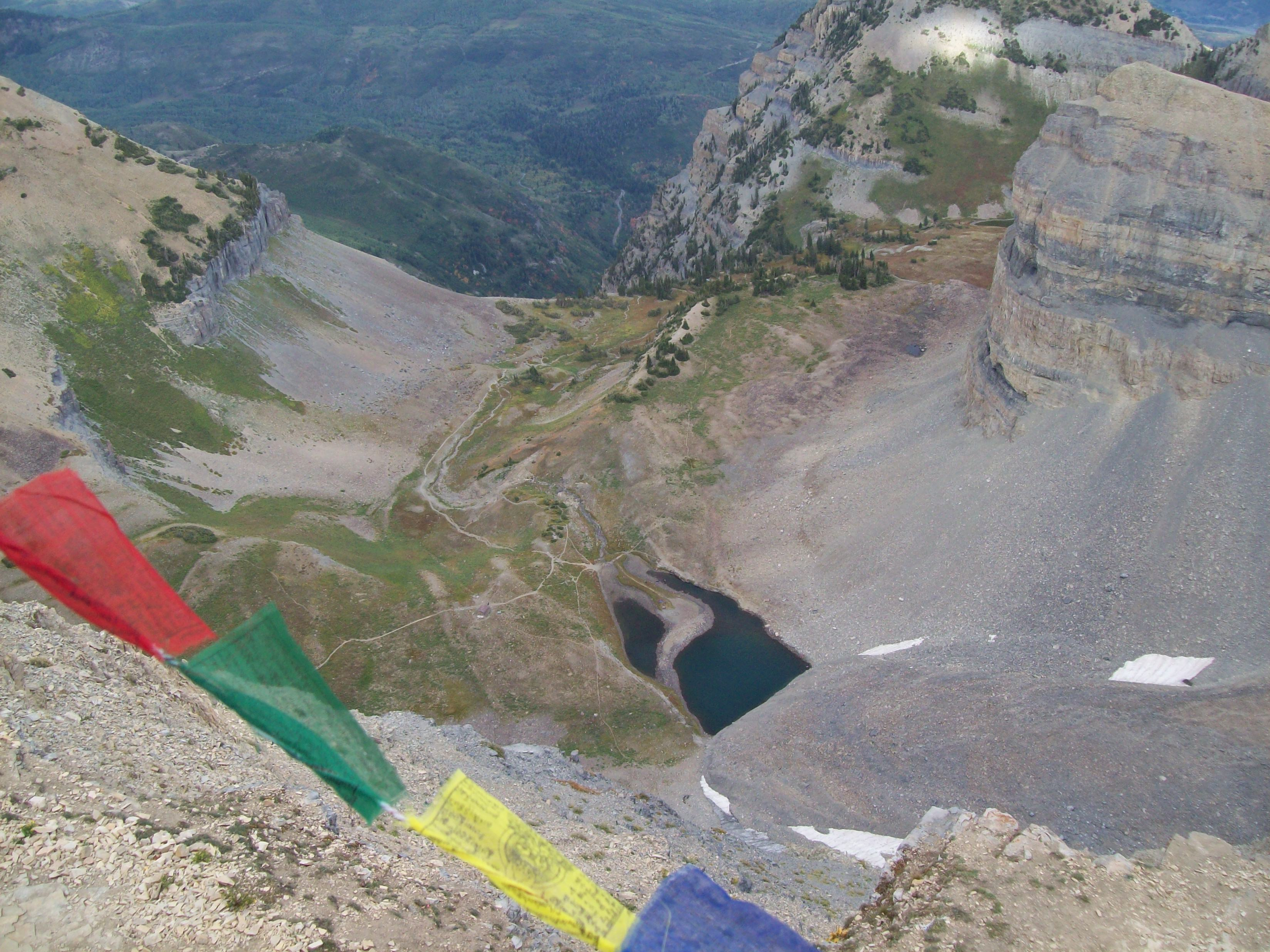
Emerald Lake and the Timpanogos Glacier from the summit of Mount Timpanogos, September 2014

The glacier is situated in a north-facing cirque on the east slope of Mount Timpanogos (11,749 feet or 3,581 metres). Eyewitness accounts indicate that the Timpanogos Glacier was once a "true" glacier with crevasses present in the early 20th century, but that the surface portion was lost during the Dust Bowl drought of the 1930s and reduced to a permanent snowfield. However, a 1981 study using rock rind measurements found it was more likely always a rock glacier during the neoglacial, and photographic evidence shows that large portions of it have been debris covered since at least 1907, casting this narrative into doubt.

The glacier is considered to be a rock glacier, since the remaining ice is buried in the talus. However, in 1994 the rocks parted, revealing a crevasse or meltwater channel in the buried ice. One witness described it as being "40 feet [12 m] thick at least." Another crevasse reportedly opened up in the late 1990s or early 2000s. One witness threw a stone in and from the fall time calculated that it was over 100 feet (30 m) deep. Around this time Brigham Young University dug three to five feet (0.91–1.52 m) down to the ice and attempted to obtain a core sample and study the ice crystal morphology. The core sample was reportedly contaminated and the crystal morphology study was unsuccessful.

Today, the rock glacier consists of three flow lobes. A 1981 study believed the main one to be inactive, the uppermost one probably active, and the one in-between probably extinct. On September 3, 2016, an amateur geologist found a meltwater pit in the uppermost flow lobe full of opaque glacial runoff and a small amount of exposed glacial ice. He dug through the rocks in the slope of the pit and found blue ice about three feet (0.91 m) down. The ice contained bubbles and was therefore probably glacial in origin.

A study published by the University of Utah in 2026 using gravity measurements revealed the rock glacier's core to be 18.8 meters (62 feet) thick on average, and 30 to 45 meters (98-148 feet) thick along the centerline, with some areas possibly up to 55 meters (180 ft) deep. The deepest section is located near the toe of the rock glacier. The study estimated the ice-rich core to be 83% ice and 17% rock, with a volume of approximately 1.55 million cubic meters. When including the surface debris layer, the total volume consists of 72% ice and 28% rock. The study also measured the rock glacier's overall movement to be about 15 centimeters per year on average, with local variation from about 8 to 20 cm.

Another University of Utah study in 2026 found that the glacier adds mass via rockfalls burying snow and firn, preventing it from melting, and eventually compacting into glacial ice. Exposed ice in the glacier's location has an average mass balance of -0.21 meters per year, making a surface glacier impossible, but a mass balance of +8 centimeters per year for debris covered ice. Electrical Resistivity Tomography measurements show the debris layer's average thickness to be between 3 and 5 meters. This thins to 45 centimeters or less in the uppermost portion, where meltwater ponds with exposed ice and a moulin or similar feature are exposed in snowless years such as 2021. A geologist from Utah State University obtained a sample of the ice and sent it to the National Science Ice Core Facility in Colorado.

Over the years, the glacier has been the site of multiple injuries and several fatalities.

Emerald Lake is a small proglacial lake which lies at the terminal moraine left behind by the vanished surface portion of the Timpanogos Glacier. The occasional blue color of Emerald Lake is an indicator of the buried glacial ice.

== See also ==
- List of glaciers in the United States
- Retreat of glaciers since 1850
