= Snow-hole =

Snow-hole (or snowhole) may refer to:

- The Snow Hole, a crevasse in the Taconic Mountains of New York, where snow can be found in the summertime
- snow cave, a shelter constructed in snow
