= Snow patch =

Snow accumulation which stays longer than other snow cover

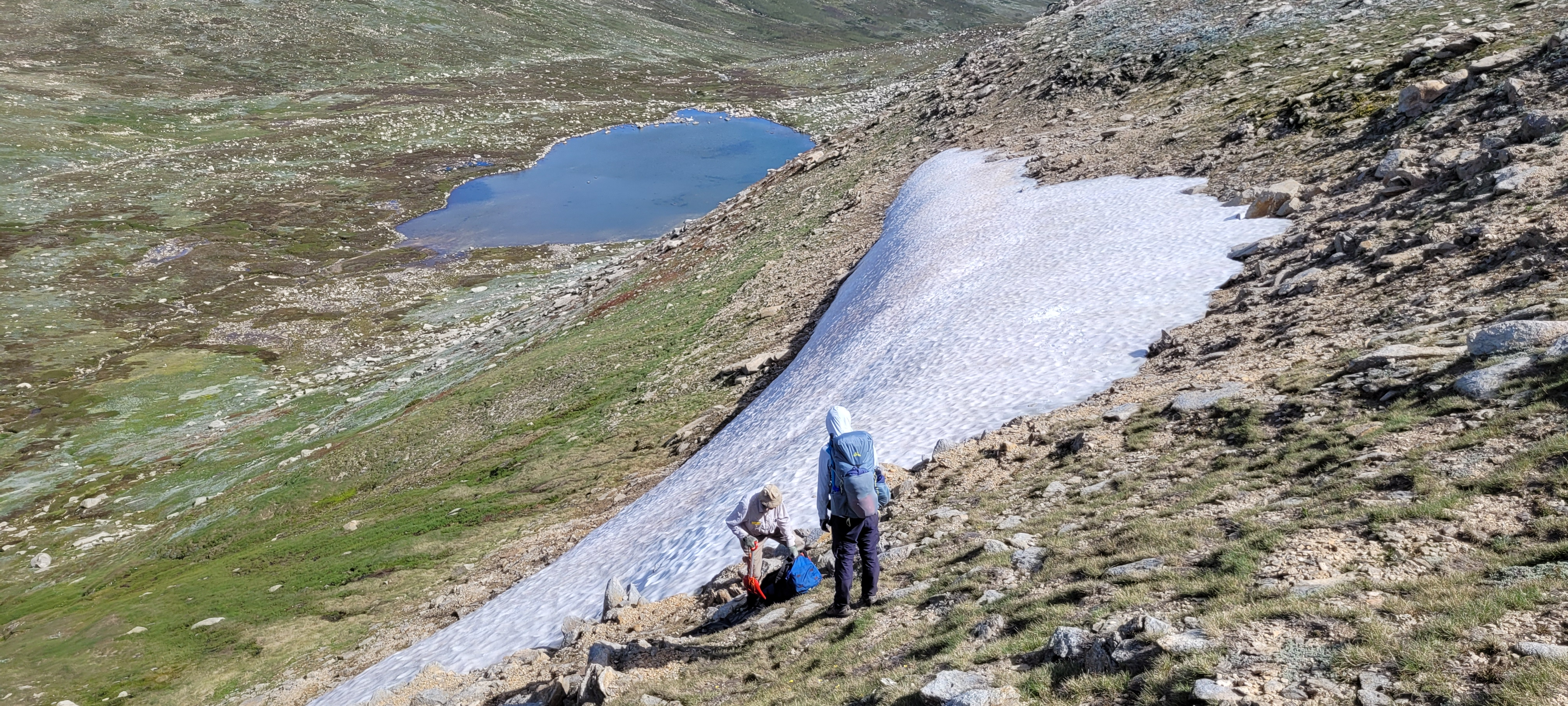
A seasonal snowpatch on the south east side of Mount Kosciuszko, Australia.

A snow patch, is a geomorphological pattern of snow and firn accumulation which lies on the surface for a longer time than other seasonal snow cover. Snow patches are known by a wide range of synonymous terms including snowpatches, snow beds, snow banks, and ice patches. Snowpatches are categorised by their longevity. Seasonal snowpatches melt prior to the return of the following winter's snowpack, semi-perennial snowpatches last occasionally to the following snowpack, while perennial snowpatches habitually last until the next winter's snowpack.

Snow patches often start in sheltered places where both thermal and orographical conditions are favourable for the conservation of snow such as small existing depressions, gullies or other concave patterns. The main process that creates these accumulations is called nivation. It is a complex of processes that includes freeze–thaw action (weathering by the alternate freezing and melting of ice), mass movement (the downhill movement of substances under gravity), and erosion by meltwater which is the main agent of the surroundings' influence.

There is high soil moisture around the snow patch that supports growing of specific vegetation. Snow patch vegetation is very distinctive. It is usually dominated by species that tolerate a shortened growing season and is predominantly herbaceous. With increasing duration of snow persistence, non–vascular plants predominate over vascular plants for example Salicetum herbaceae, Salix herbacea etc.

At times water can be seen flowing downslope from the margin of snowpatches. The origin of this water may be from the melting of the snowpatch itself, from groundwater reaching the surface in slopes next to the snowpatch or from groundwater being forced to surface by obstructing permafrost. In areas with permafrost the active layer may be lacking under snowpatches, with the permafrost extending all the way to the firn at the base of the snowpatch.

== Research and monitoring ==
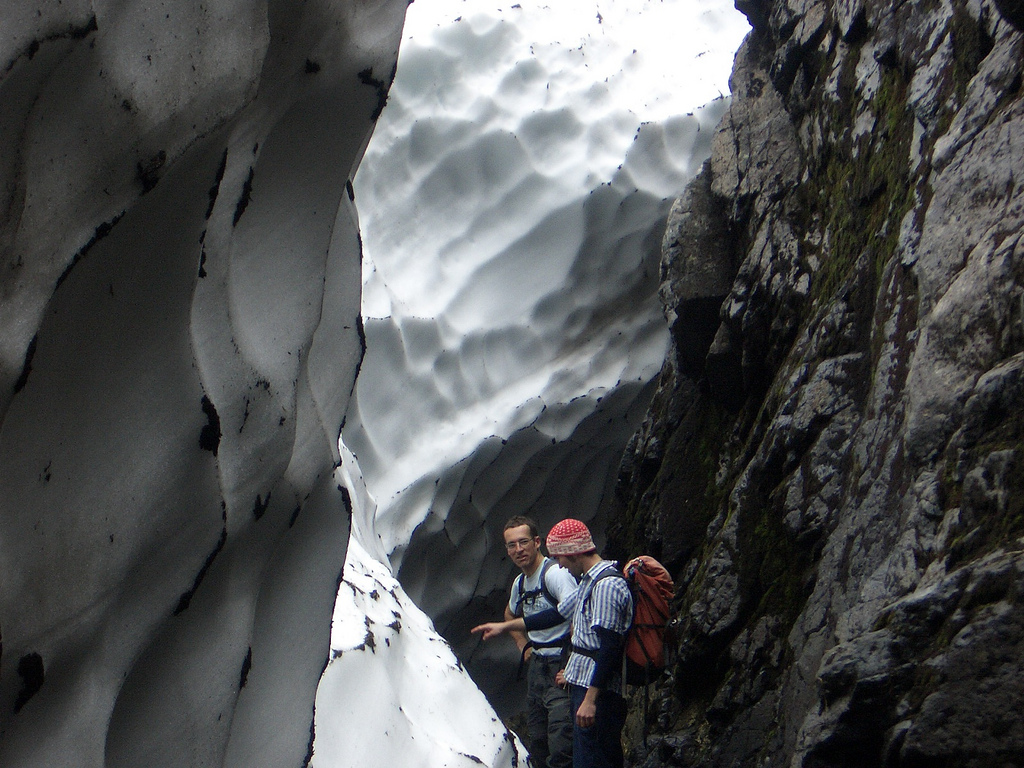
Iain Cameron, an outdoors expert, Blair Fyffe from the Scottish Avalanche Information Service, at Observatory Gully snow patch

Researchers have identified snow patches to be a climate change marker, because they influence alpine and polar environments and shape local plant groups, affect the meltwater supply, and drive geomorphological processes that is known as nivation, so changes in their ability or persistence can alter vegetation, soils and small scale landforms downslope. Researchers and scientists from many fields such as geomorphology, climatology, glaciology, hydrology, palaeoecology and archaeology expressed their growing concern about the global decline of snow patches, and there for begun to monitor snow patches to learn how different “seasonal”, “semi perennial” (year round) and “perennial” patches respond to warming and what this means for connected ecosystems and local hydrology. One of the main primary goals of their recent work has been to unify the terminology used for this field: “snowpatch” was proposed as a common term to define types, arguing that clear, shared definitions make it easier to compare studies, track long term changes in snowpatch behaviour, and use historical aerial photos and satellite images to detect major shifts.

== See also ==
- Snow patches in Scotland
