= White Rock (Taconic Mountains) =

Mountain in New York, United States

Highest point
- Elevation: 2,550 ft (780 m)
- Parent peak: 42° 43' 29"N, 73° 16' 34"W
- Coordinates: High point: 42°45′14″N 73°16′48″W; Ridgeline: 42°48′26″N 73°19′11″W to 42°43′29″N 73°16′34″W

Geography
- Location: Williamstown, Massachusetts, Pownal, Vermont, and Petersburgh, New York
- Parent range: Taconic Mountains

Geology
- Rock age: Ordovician
- Mountain type(s): Thrust fault; metamorphic rock and sedimentary rock

Climbing
- Easiest route: Taconic Crest Trail

White Rock, 2,550 feet (780 m), is the high point on a 7 mi (11 km) ridgeline in the Taconic Mountains. The ridge is located in the tri-state corner of New York, Massachusetts, and Vermont in the towns of Petersburgh, Williamstown, and Pownal. The ridge has several distinct knobs; those with names are, from south to north: White Rocks, 2,365 feet (721 m); Smith Hill, 2,330 feet (710 m); White Rock, the high point 2,550 feet (780 m); and Bald Mountain 2,485 feet (757 m). The Snow Hole, located along the ridgeline between Bald Mountain and the White Rock, is a crevasse in which snow can be found well into the summer.

== Geography ==
The summit and west side of the ridge are located in New York, the east side in Vermont, and the southeast 2 miles (3.2 km) in Massachusetts. The summit ridge is part meadow and part wooded with red spruce, balsam fir, and northern hardwood tree species. It is notable for its views of the Hoosic River valley and Hudson River Valley. The 35 mi (56 km) Taconic Crest Trail traverses the mountain. Portions of the ridge are within protected conservation land, but much of it is privately owned.

The Taconic Mountains continue north from White Rock ridge across the Hoosic River valley as Mount Anthony and south over Petersburgh Pass as Mount Raimer. The White Rock ridge is flanked to the east across the Hoosic River Valley by the western escarpment of the Green Mountains. The west side of the ridge drains into the Little Hoosic River, thence into the Hoosic River, the Hudson River, and Long Island Sound. The east side drains into the Hoosic River. Petersburg Pass, located on New York Route 2/ Massachusetts Route 2, cuts over the gap between the southernmost knob of the ridge, White Rocks, and Mount Raimer, at an elevation of 1,650 feet (500 m).
