= Snow patches in Scotland =

Persistent Scottish formations of accumulated snowflakes

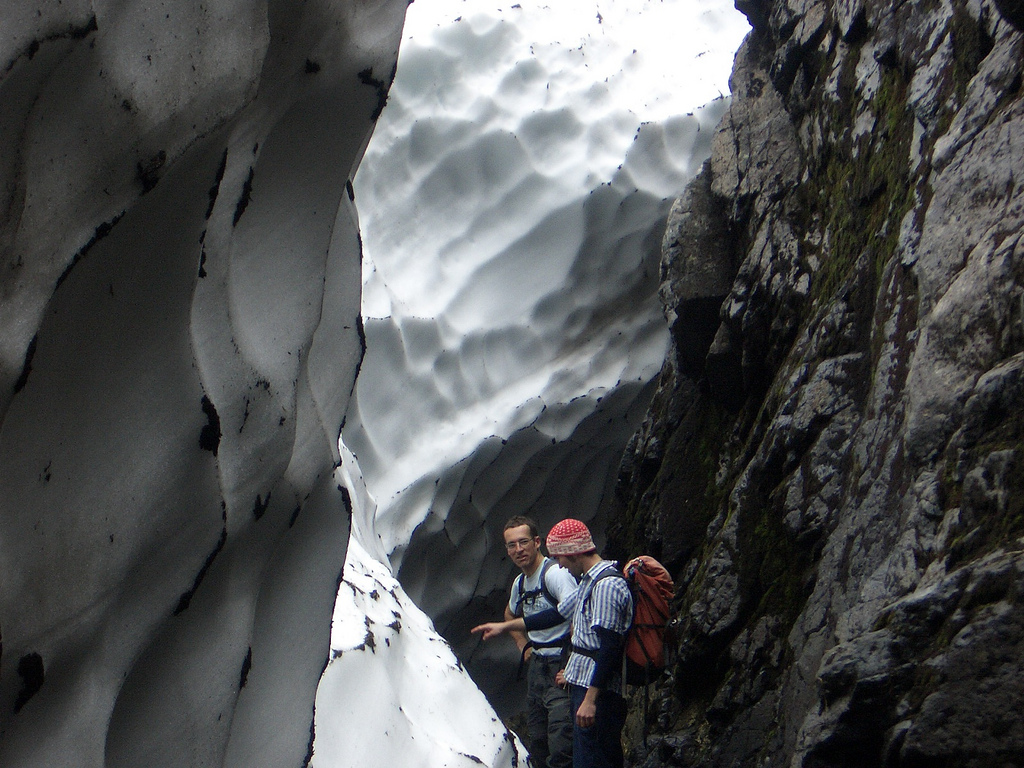
Iain Cameron and Dr Blair Fyffe at the Observatory Gully patch on Ben Nevis, 23 August 2008.

Long-lying snow patches in Scotland have been noted from at least the 18th century, with snow patches on Ben Nevis being observed well into summer and autumn. Indeed, the summit observatory, which operated from 1883 to 1904, reported that snow survived on the north-east cliffs through more years than it vanished.

More recently, additional and methodical field study on the subject has been carried out by others, such as Iain Cameron a Scottish researcher and the ecologist Dr Adam Watson. Most of this work concentrated on the mountains of north-east Scotland (in particular, the Cairngorms), but more recent observations by him and others has shed light on various locations throughout Scotland where long-lying snow persists. The available information systematically gathered by observers over the last 50 years or so, and greatly increased since the 1990s, has built up a level of knowledge that points to Scotland's snow patches being now amongst the best documented in the world.

== General locations ==
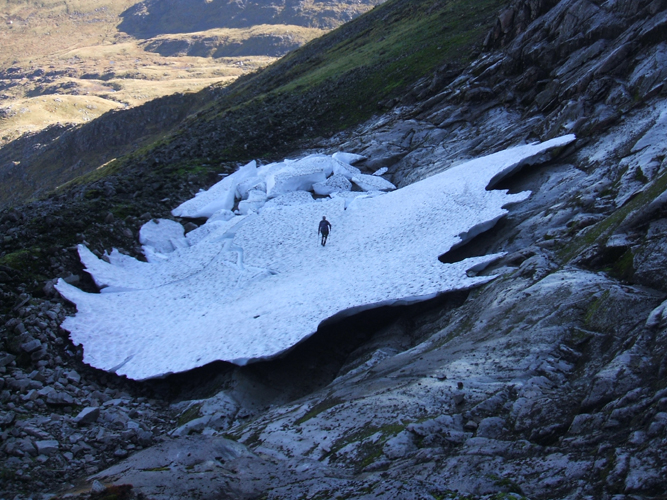
Aonach Mòr's protalus snow-patch on 1 October 2007. This patch sits on solid bedrock and melts more quickly than other patches because of water running underneath.

There are many locations on the Scottish mountains where snow lies regularly into July, August and even September, but the two main areas where snow virtually always lies longer than anywhere else are the Cairngorms and the Lochaber mountains. These areas contain all of Scotland's mountains in excess of 4,000 feet (1,219 m), including Ben Nevis.

In some years snow can persist all summer, in some locations lasting through to the next winter. In 2015 some 73 patches were still present in late November at a time when the next winter's snows had started accumulating. The last time so many patches had survived all year was 1994.

Other locations where snow has been known to survive:

- Creag Meagaidh hills, survived in 1994 and 2015
- Glen Affric/Strathfarrar hills, usually melts mid/late August but survivals have been noted on Sgurr na Lapaich, An Riabhachan and Toll Creagach as recently as 2015.
- Ben Wyvis, normally melts July/August, though survival has been noted (A Watson)
- Grey Corries, normally survives until July/August, has survived at least once on Stob Coire Easain (A Watson) and in 2015 on Stob Coire an Laoigh.
- Ben Alder range. Snow has survived at Geal-Charn on multiple occasions, most recently in 2015.

Starting in 2009, and for 120 months consecutively, someone has been able to find snow for skiing somewhere in Scotland.

== The Cairngorms ==
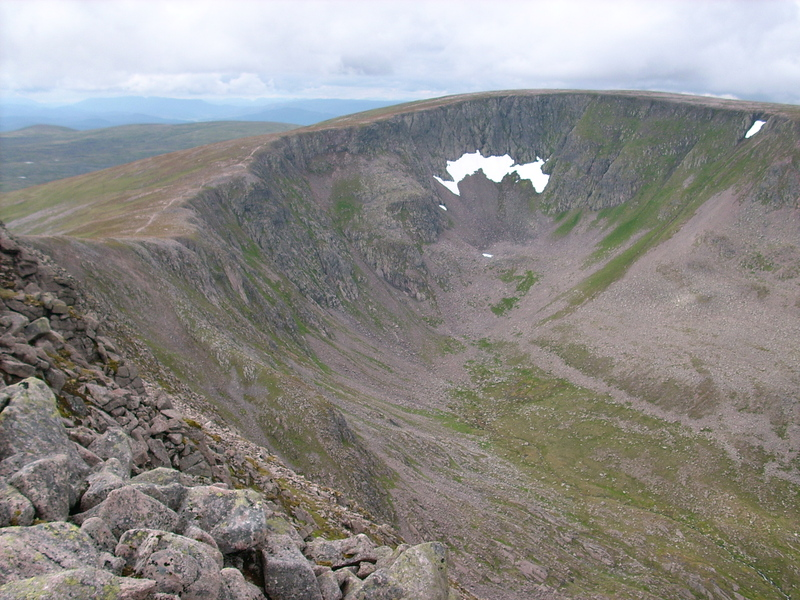
Scotland's most durable snow patch, Garbh Choire Mòr, Braeriach, 8 August 2008

As well as containing five of the highest mountains in the United Kingdom, the Cairngorms is the range where snow persists longest, and in more locations, than anywhere else in the UK. Ben Macdui, Cairn Gorm and Braeriach all contain long-lying patches that have been observed for many years.

On Ben Macdui, snow has been known to persist at a few locations from one winter to the next, but the location where more survivals have been noted than any other is grid reference NH994010, close to the Garbh Uisge Beag, which drains into Loch Avon. This patch sits at an altitude of 1,060 metres (3,478 ft).

Lying at the north-eastern shoulder of Cairn Gorm is Ciste Mhearad. This hollow contains a patch which, hitherto, was known to persist through many years, but has done so only once (in 2015) since 2000. Observations in 2007 and 2008 revealed that September was the month when final melting occurred for this patch. It sits at an altitude of 1,095 metres (3,593 ft) and is located at approximately grid reference NJ011046.

Braeriach's Garbh Choire Mòr is the place which contains Britain's most persistent snow beds. Snow has been absent from this corrie just twelve times in the last century, seven of them in the last decade: 1933, 1959, 1996, 2003, 2006, 2017, 2018, 2021, 2022, 2023, 2024 and 2025. Sitting at an altitude of about 1,140 metres (3,740 ft), these patches are located around grid reference NN940980 [57.0605,-3.7495]; the two most long-lasting patches are known as "the Pinnacles" and "the Sphinx" after the rock climbs lying above them. It has been claimed that Garbh Choire Mòr (as well as Coire an Lochain in the northern corries) may have contained a glacier as recently as the 19th century. In 2024, the Sphinx snow patch completely disappeared for the fourth year in succession. Since 1700, this patch has disappeared in 1933, 1959, 1996, 2003, 2006, 2017, 2018, and from 2021 to 2024.

In 1994, the Cairngorms and surrounding mountains of north-east Scotland had 55 surviving patches, an exceptional number.

== Ben Nevis range ==
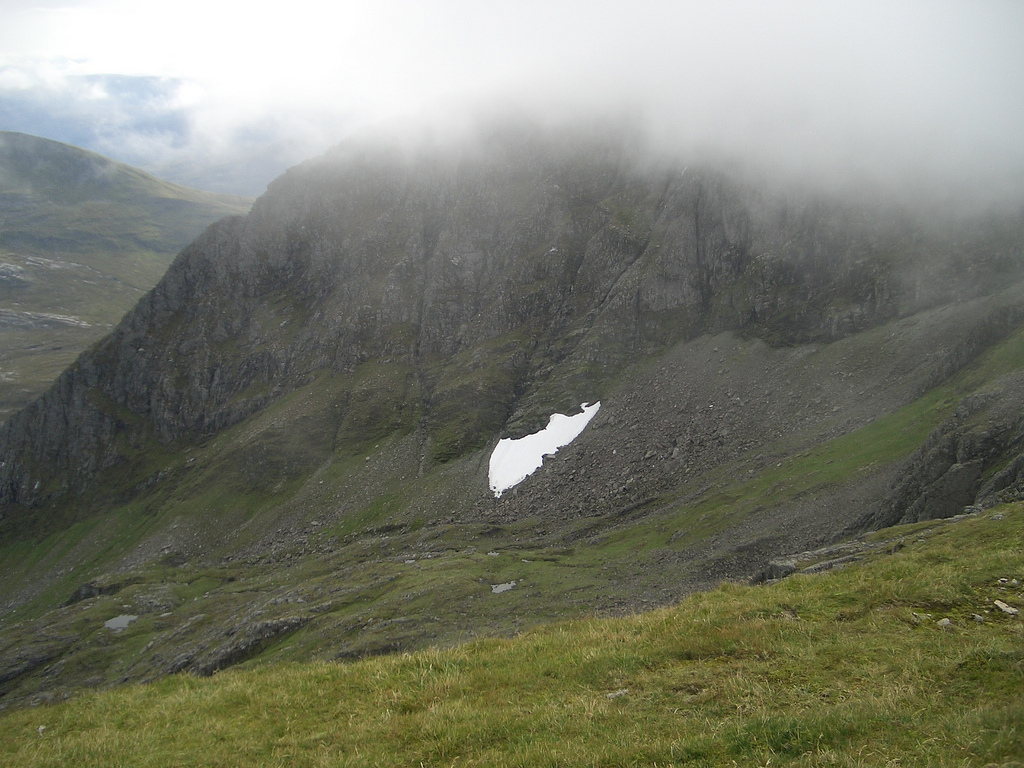
Low-lying patch on Aonach Beag, 8 September 2008

As well as containing Scotland's highest mountain (Ben Nevis), Aonach Mòr, Aonach Beag and Càrn Mòr Dearg make up the other three mountains in excess of 4,000 feet (1,219 m) in this area.

As already noted, Ben Nevis has long been known to hold snow late into the year. However, historical reports from the 19th century and early 20th century of snow being ever present on the mountain are virtually impossible to substantiate, so must remain speculative. Nevertheless, what is certainly true is that snow often persists from one winter to the next. Analysis of Ben Nevis's snow is not as comprehensive as that of the Cairngorms, but recent observations show that Ben Nevis has been snow-free only once since 2006 (in 2017). The largest patch, at Observatory Gully, sits at an altitude of around 1,130 metres (3,707 ft). The slightly lower patch at Point 5 gully has also been known to survive from one winter to the next.

Aonach Mòr has a corrie known to hold snow from one year to the next: Coire an Lochain. One of these patches, sitting behind a protalus rampart, sometimes survives longer than the patch slightly higher up against the tall cliffs.

Below the cliffs of the north-east ridge on Aonach Beag there is a relatively little known snow-patch which, despite its low altitude (approximately 955 metres (3,133 ft) ), has been Scotland's largest at the time of the arrival of the lasting new winter snows of 2007 and 2008. This patch does not appear in known literature on the subject and this suggests that it is very much under-recorded, which may be because it cannot readily be seen, even from the top of Aonach Mòr or Aonach Beag.

== See also ==
- Corrie
- Newman's lady-fern – a snow-tolerant species endemic to Scotland.
- Icy rock moss – a species found in Cairngorms National Park, where it is typically found on rocks in burns fed by snow patches.
- Younger Dryas
