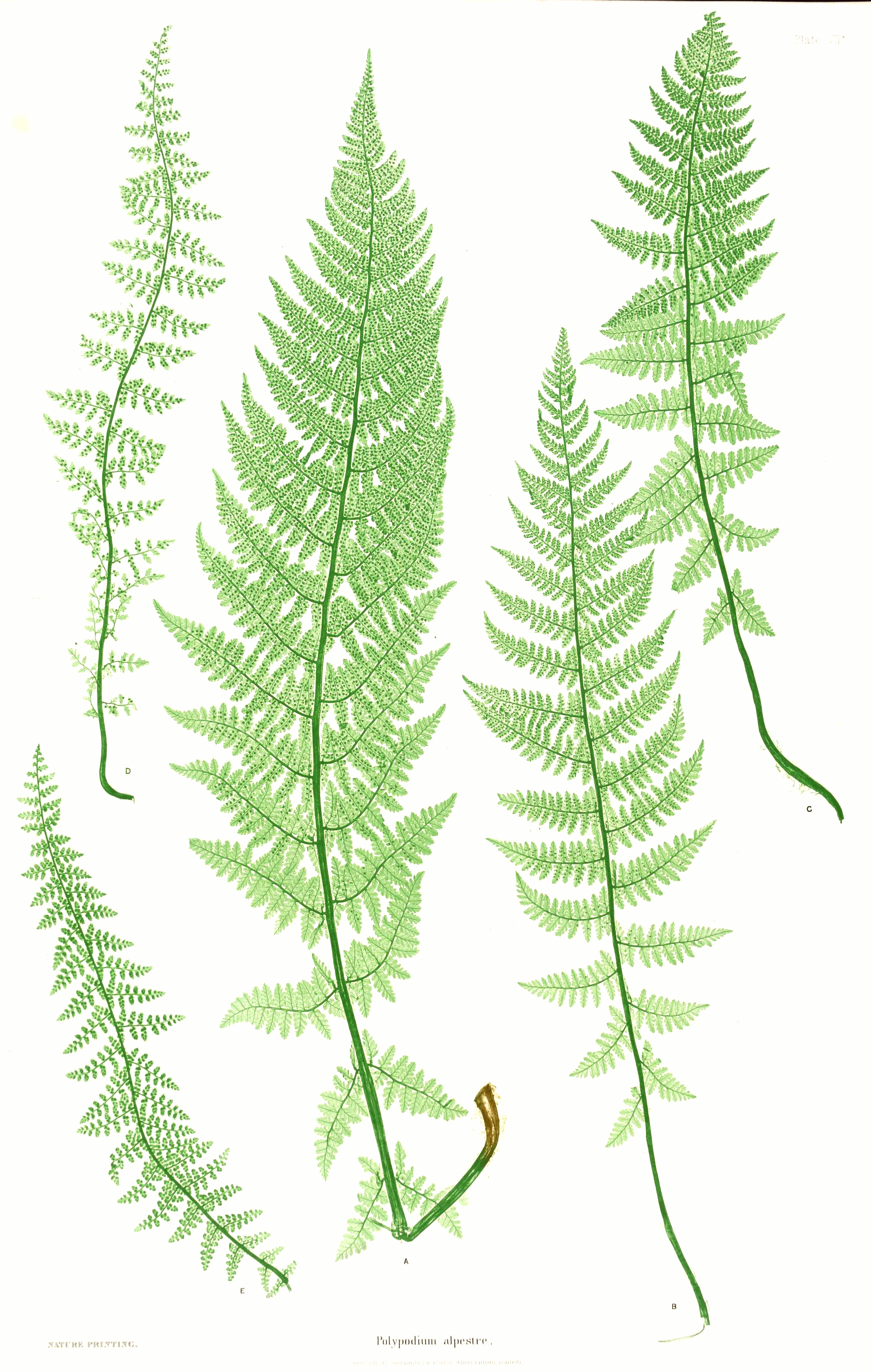

Scientific classification
- Kingdom: Plantae
- Clade: Tracheophytes
- Division: Polypodiophyta
- Class: Polypodiopsida
- Order: Polypodiales
- Suborder: Aspleniineae
- Family: Athyriaceae
- Genus: Athyrium
- Species: A. distentifolium

Binomial name
- Athyrium distentifolium Tausch ex Opiz

= Athyrium distentifolium =

Alpine lady-fern

Species of plant

Athyrium distentifolium commonly known as alpine lady-fern is a perennial fern found in widely in the Northern Hemisphere.

== Description ==
This plant is light green with a somewhat upright rootstock. The leaves, 30-70 cm, form as fascicle at the tip of the rootstock. The petiole is at most a fourth of the length of the leaf blade and scaled. The leaf blade is narrowing towards both the base and tip, repeatedly double pinnate. The leaflets are acuminate and pinnules are serrate or pinnately lobed. The sporangium are on the underside of the leaves in indusium-less sori.

== Habitat ==
The plant is native to Finland and its fjelds. There it grows best in bare fjeld regions, in the slopes long moistened by the meltwaters from the spots of snow. In the lower alpine regions within easy reach of the birch groves and sometimes in the birch zones, this plant grows at the edges of tall-grass meadows.

When it comes to soil, this plant is not too demanding; it is said to even somewhat prefer acidic soil and avoid lime. Its own leaflitter is at least acidic and at least not many other vascular plants grow around it.

== Distribution ==
It is a common upland variety above 600 metres in the Highlands of Scotland, with more than 10% of the UK population being found in the Cairngorm mountains, especially on scree slopes in Glen Feshie, and on Ben Avon, Ben MacDui and Beinn a' Bhùird. Regarded as nationally scarce, it is a snow-tolerant species. The stunted form var. flexile, which is found at 750 metres and above, is found at only 4 sites and is endemic to Scotland.

The subspecies americanum is found in the mountains of western United States, Alaska, Canada and coastal Greenland, and is sometimes classified as a separate species Athyrium americanum.

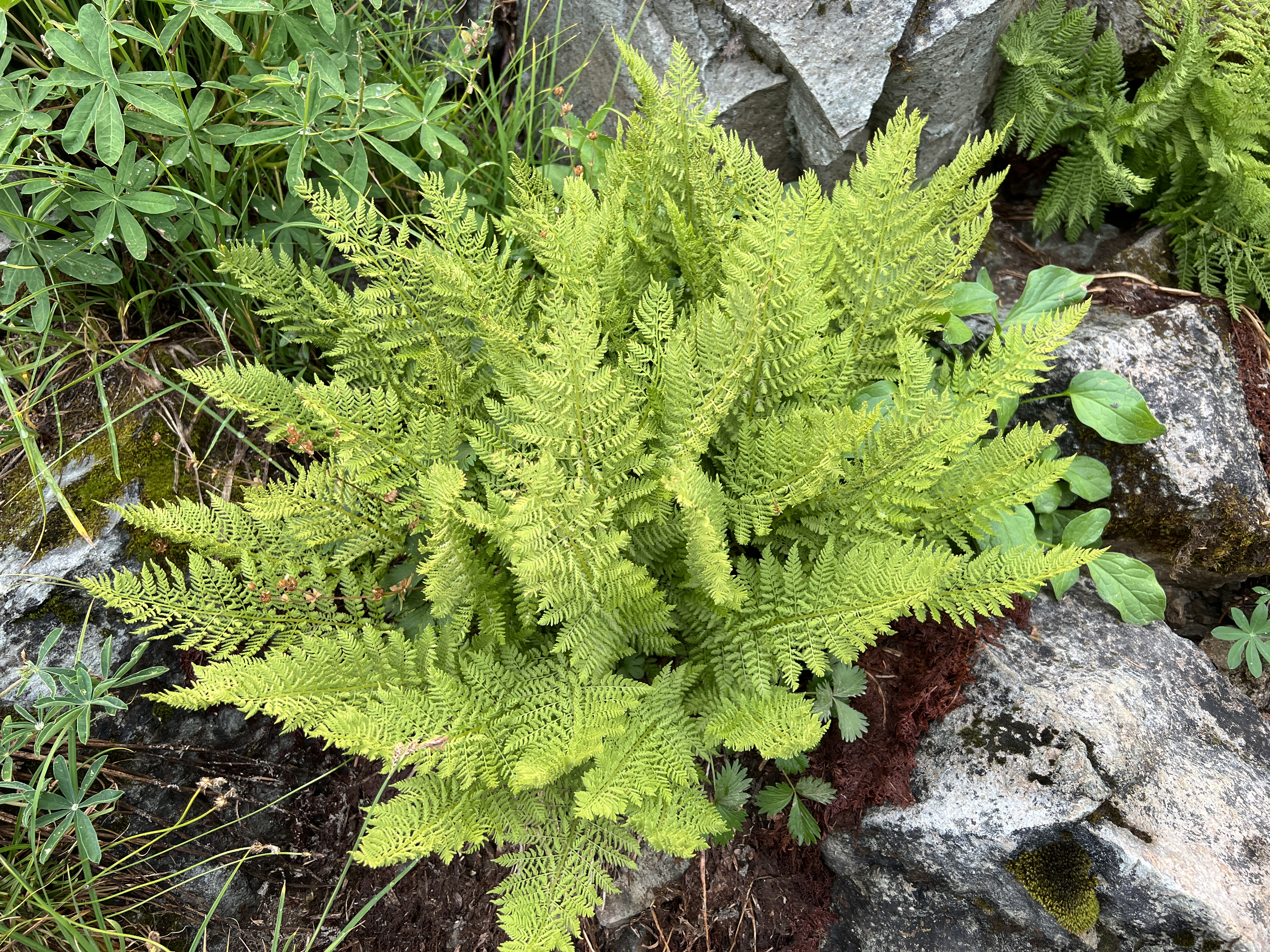
Athyrium distentifolium ssp. americanum

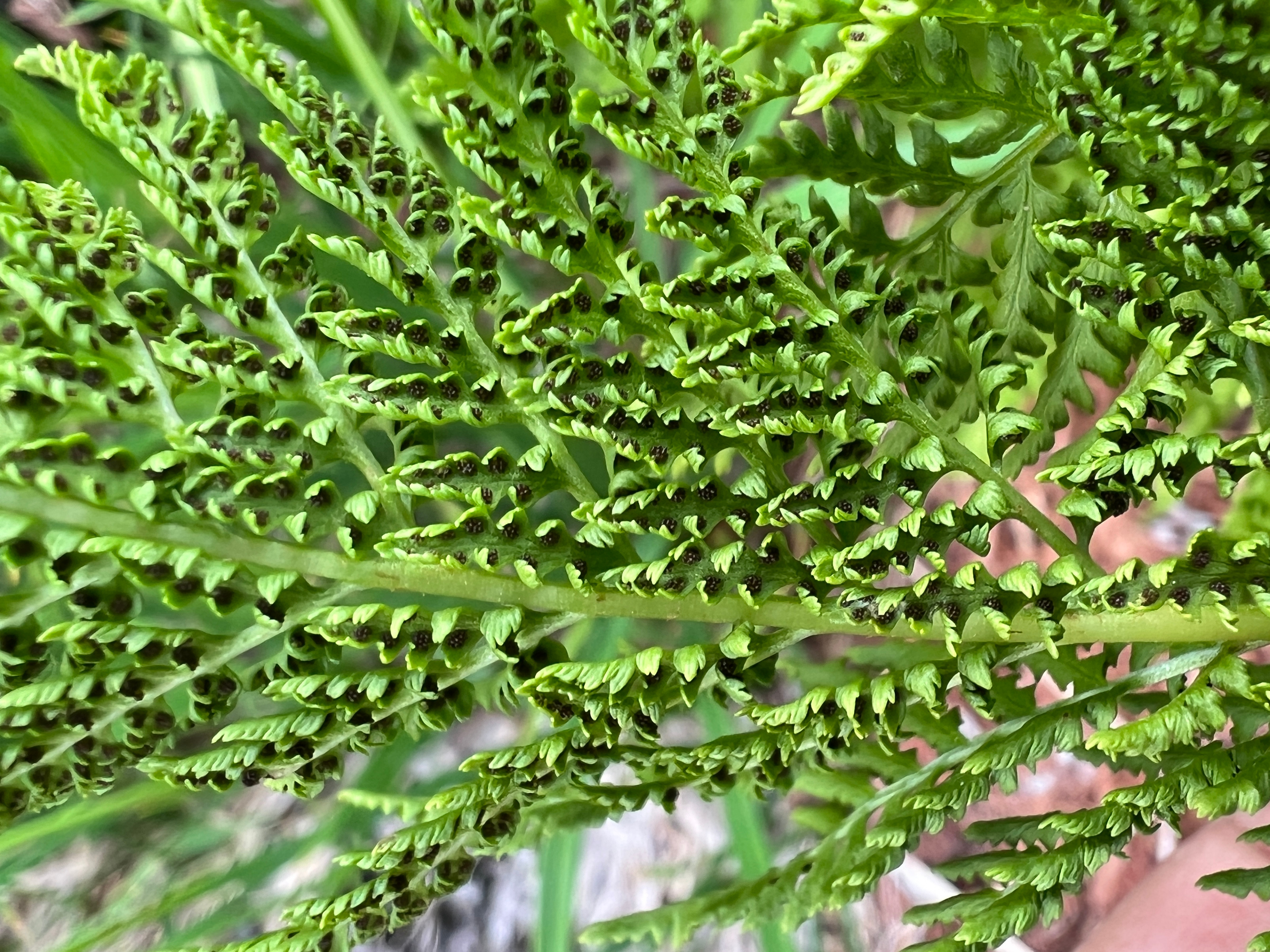
Athyrium distentifolium ssp. americanum lower surface of leaf

== Names ==
The Finnish name of the plant, tunturihiirenporras, directly translates to "fjeld mouse's stair", suggesting it to be the fjeld "version" of Athyrium filix-femina.
