= Mount Timpanogos =

Mountain in Utah, United States

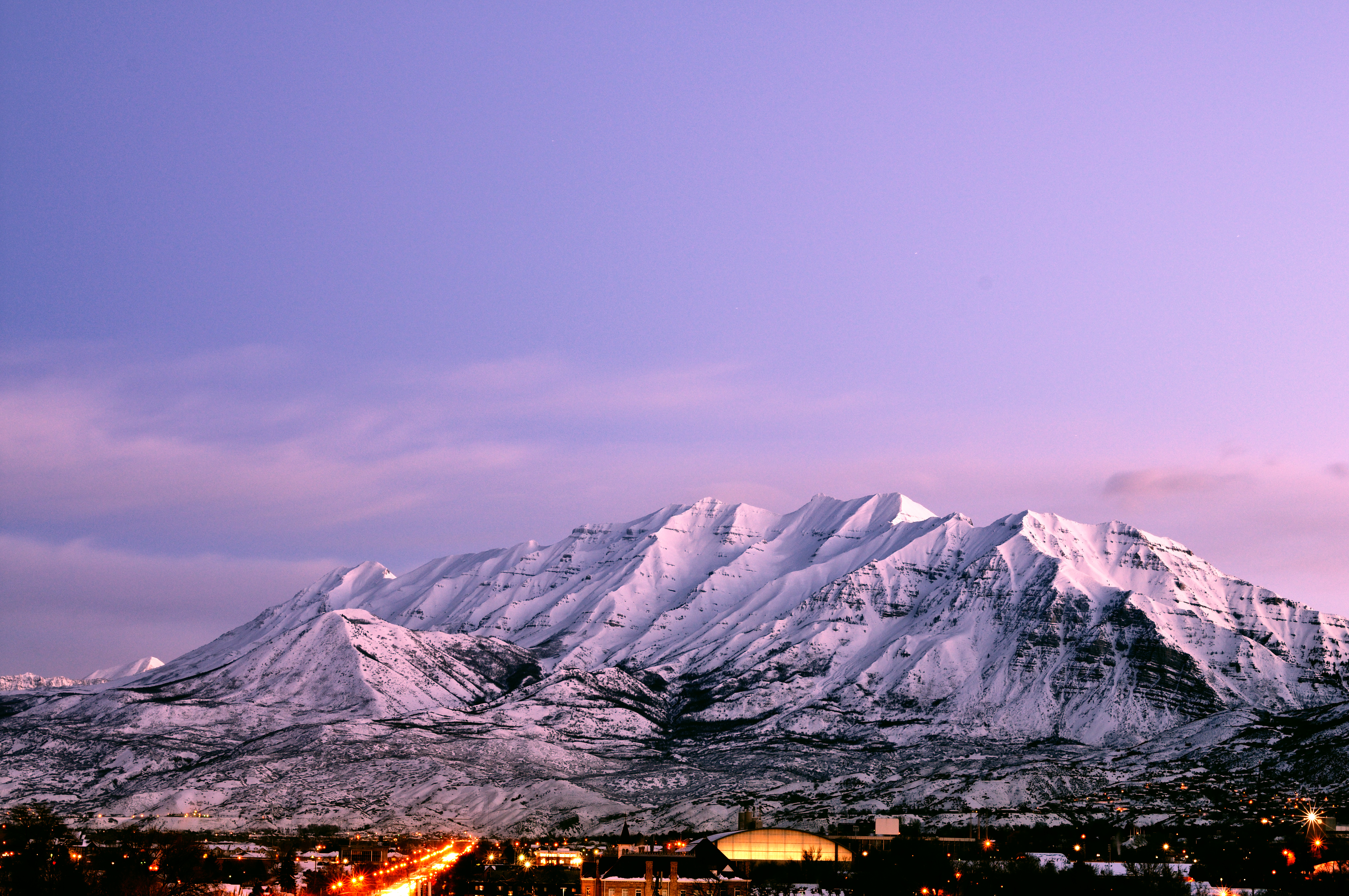
- Mt. Timpanogos from Provo

Highest point
- Elevation: 11,753 ft (3,582 m) NAVD 88
- Prominence: 5,269 ft (1,606 m)
- Listing: US most prominent peaks 106th
- Coordinates: 40°23′27″N 111°38′45″W

Geography
- Location within Utah
- Location: Utah County, Utah, U.S.
- Parent range: Wasatch Range
- Topo map: USGS Timpanogos

Mount Timpanogos, often referred to as Timp, is the second-highest mountain in Utah's Wasatch Range. Timpanogos rises to an elevation of 11,752 ft (3,582 m) above sea level in the Uinta-Wasatch-Cache National Forest. With 5,270 ft (1,610 m) of topographic prominence, Timpanogos is the 47th-most prominent mountain in the contiguous United States.

The mountain towers about 7,000 ft (2,100 m) over Utah Valley, including the cities of Lehi, Provo, Orem, Pleasant Grove, American Fork, Lindon and others. The exposed massif of the mountain is made up entirely of limestone and dolomite from the Pennsylvanian period, and is about 300 million years old. Heavy winter snowfall is characteristic of this portion of the Wasatch Range, and avalanche activity is common in winter and spring. The mountain is also home to Timpanogos Cave National Monument, a series of decorated caves in the north end of the mountain that have guided ranger tours open daily to the public during the warmer months.

== Etymology ==
The word Timpanogos comes from the Timpanogos tribe who lived in the surrounding valleys from AD 1400. The name translates as "rock" (tumpi-), and "water mouth" or "canyon" (panogos).

== Glacial activity ==
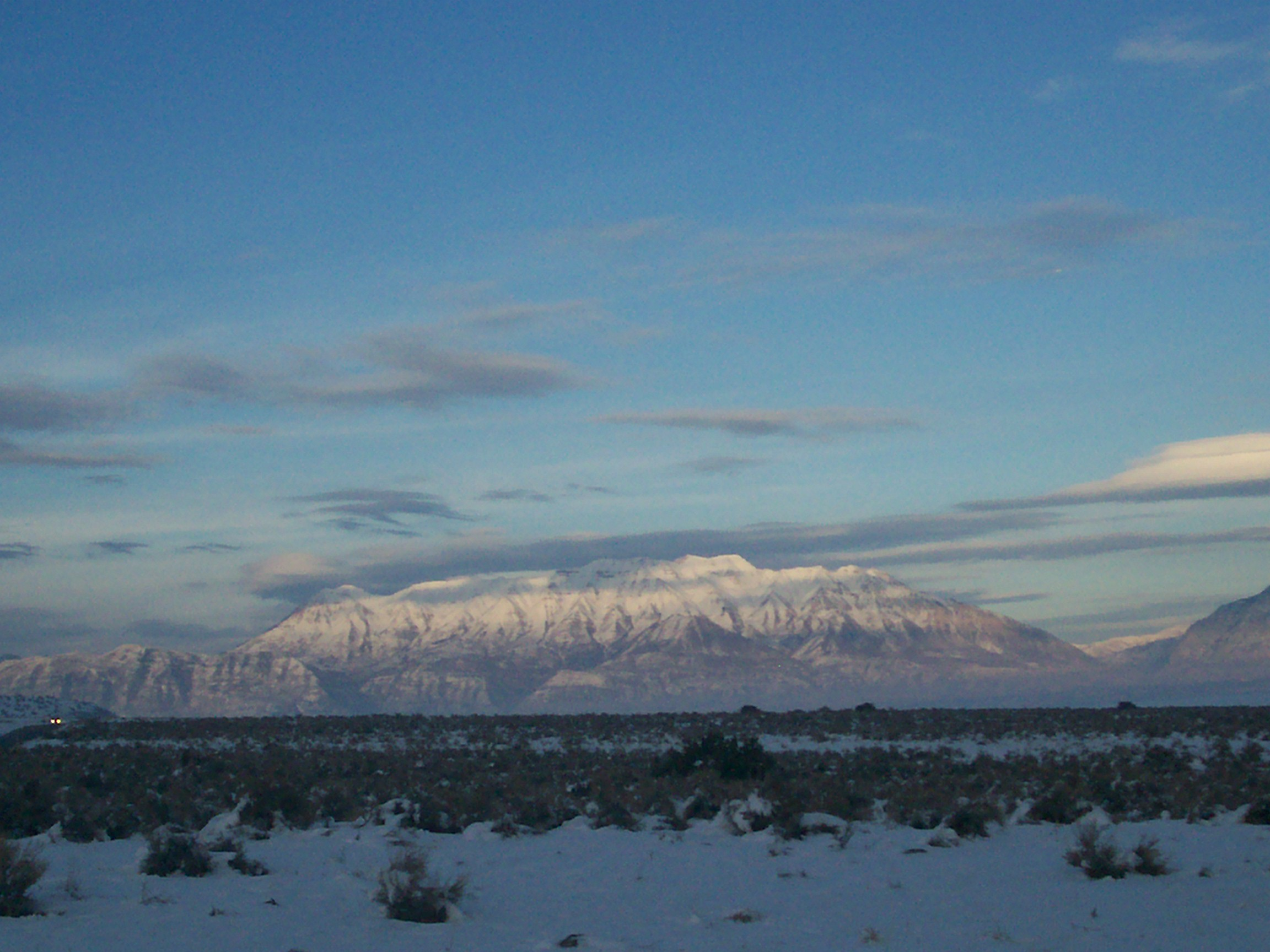
Mount Timpanogos is visible from much of Utah County.

Mount Timpanogos displays many examples of various glacial processes and the sculpting power of moving ice. Ice Age glaciers mantled the peak until relatively recently and dramatically shaped the mountain into an Alpine tableau of knife-edge ridges and yawning, U-shaped amphitheaters. A remnant of these glaciers persists in the deeply recessed hanging valley below the main summit. Timpanogos Glacier is a rock-covered mass found on a long, north-facing slope and usually has patches of snow the entire year. Although an above-ground cirque glacier was present before the Dust Bowl Drought of the 1930s, no glacial ice is visible today. However, in 1994, a large crevasse opened up, revealing that there still is a glacier buried beneath the talus. Flowing water can occasionally be heard beneath the rocks. Emerald Lake, a small proglacial lake at the bottom of the cirque, often exhibits a blue color, indicating that the glacier is probably still moving, although perhaps too slowly to be noticeable. The locally unique ice is a relic of the region's formerly colder climate and has long been a major attraction to hikers and climbers on the mountain, who often slide down its permanent snowfield as a shorter descent route. Its precise classification remains the subject of ongoing debate, whether "real" or not.

== Hiking ==
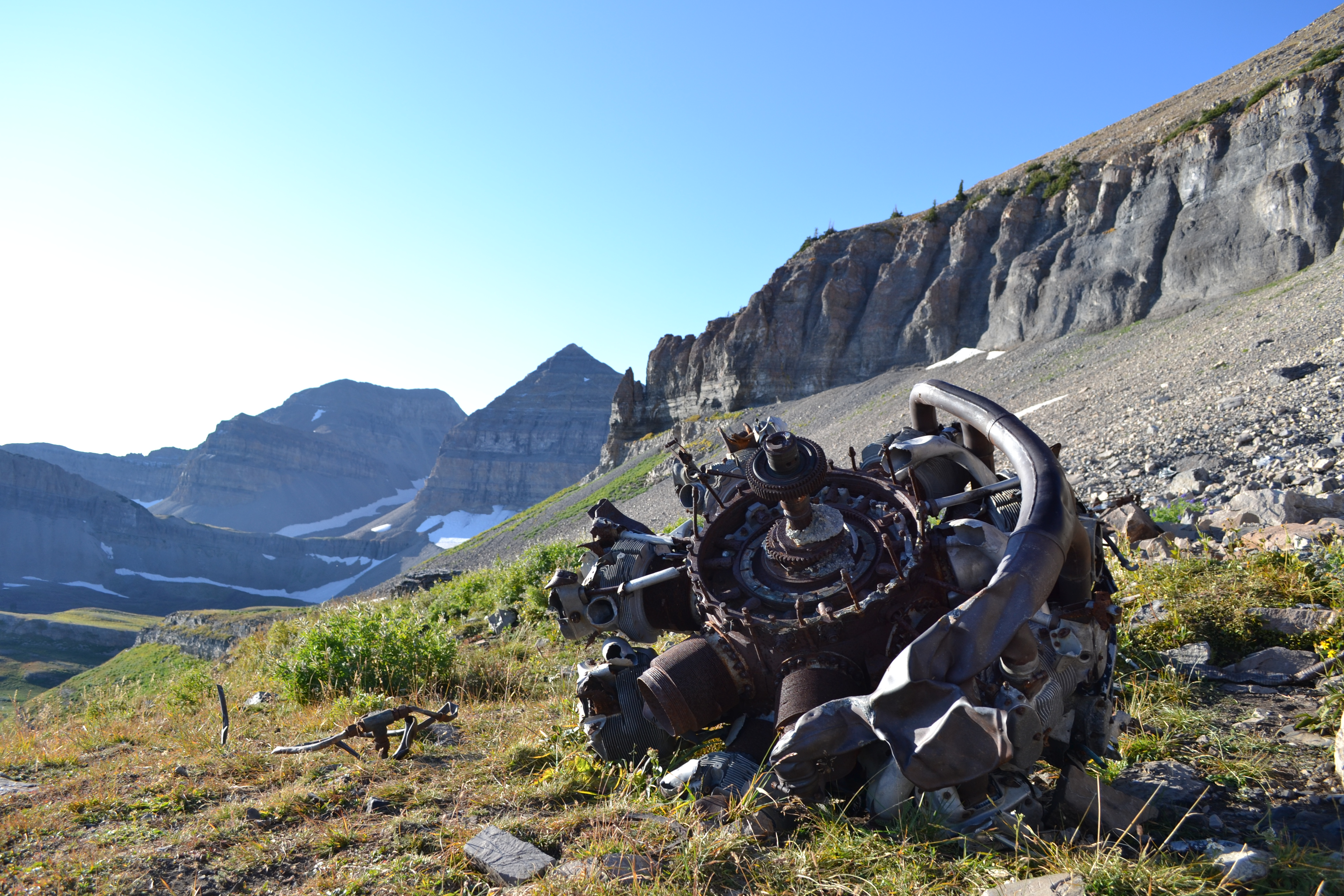
Radial Engine from a 1955 B-25 bomber crash site. The Mount Timpanogos peak is in the background.

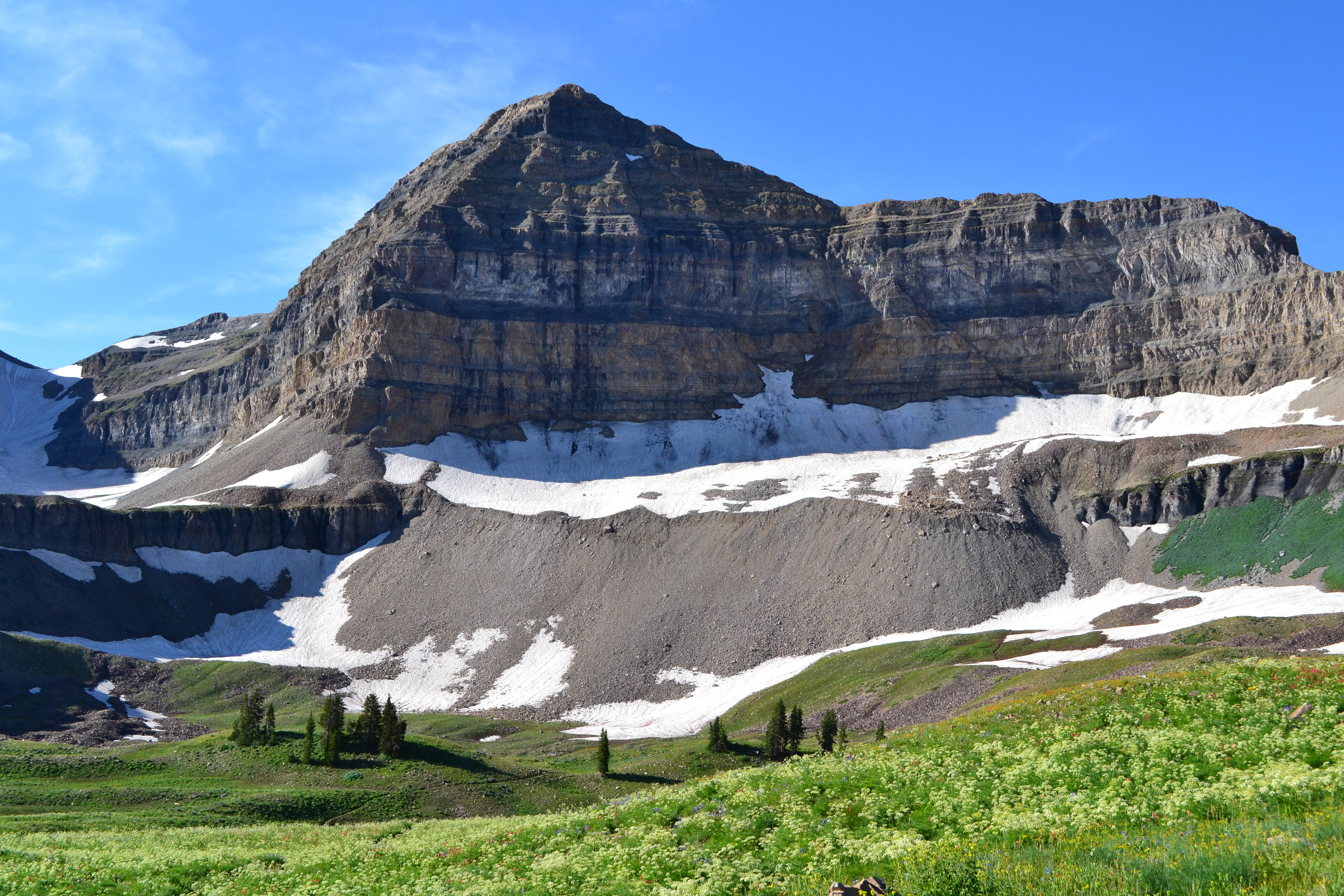
View of Mount Timpanogos from Timpooneke trail

Mount Timpanogos is one of Utah's most popular hiking/climbing destinations and is climbed year-round. Winter climbing requires advanced mountaineering ability. In spring, undercutting of deeply drifted snow by streams creates a hazard that has proven fatal on several occasions. Climbers can fall through the undermined snow 50 feet (15 m) or more into the icy stream underneath.

Although it is a 14-mile (23 km) round-trip hike, with almost 5,300 feet (1,600 m) of elevation gain, Timpangos's summit is one of the most frequently visited in the Rocky Mountains. There are two main trails to the top: the first starts at Aspen Grove with a trailhead elevation of 6,910 feet (2,106 m), and the second starts at the Timpooneke campground in American Fork Canyon at 7,370 feet (2,250 meters). The two trails are nearly the same length. Hikers on the trails climb through montane forest, subalpine and alpine zones. The hike is marked by waterfalls, conifers, rocky slopes and ridges, mountain goats, and a small lake, Emerald Lake, at 10,380 feet (3,160 m). A short diversion will lead hikers past the remains of a North American B-25 Mitchell which crashed on the mountain in 1955 due to poor visibility during a flight from Malmstrom Air Force Base in Montana, and Hill Air Force Base in Utah. All five crew members died. Other climbing routes exist on the mountain, but they are more technically demanding and require special skills and mountaineering gear.

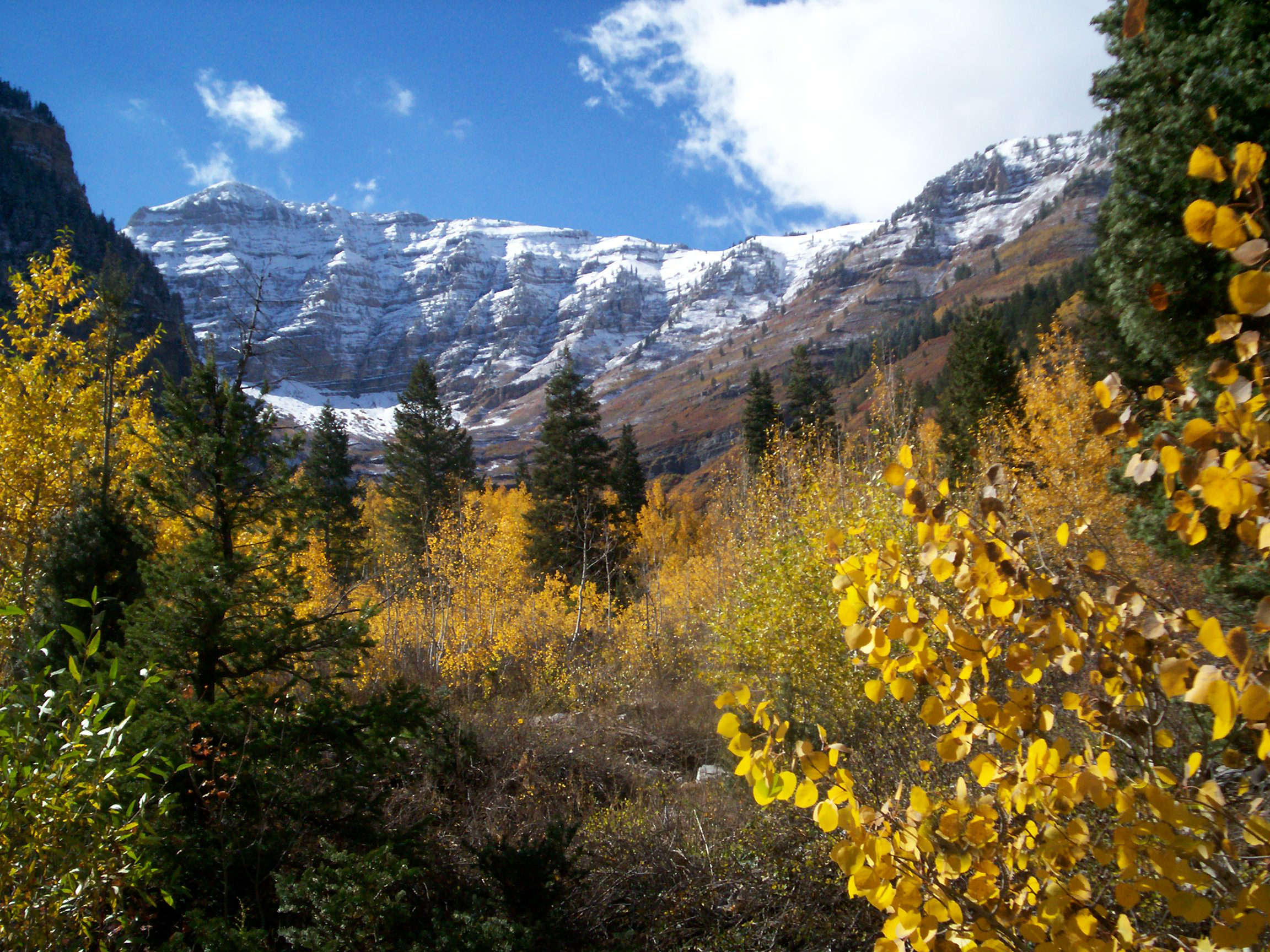
East side of Timpanogos as seen from the Alpine Loop.

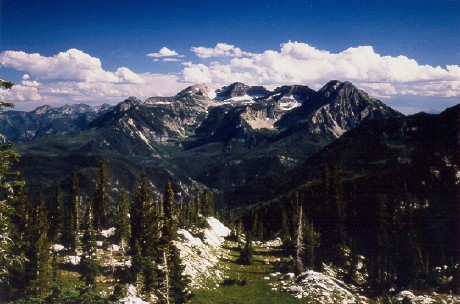
The east side of Timpanogos as seen from Silver Glance Lake.

Prior to 1970, an annual Provo event called the "Timp Hike" sent thousands of people up the mountain's slopes. From 1911 to 1970 this one-day event (which took place generally on the third or fourth weekend in July) attracted thousands of people to the mountain. It also created the need for infrastructure, such as the stone shelter built in 1959 near Emerald Lake and a smaller metal shack on the summit (this was used as an observation deck complete with brass rods etched with notches aligned with various landmarks). The hike caused environmental damage to the mountain, and was finally canceled to help preserve the delicate mountain ecosystem. Despite the presence of the existing structures, the mountain was designated a wilderness area by the U.S. Congress in 1984.

== Geology ==
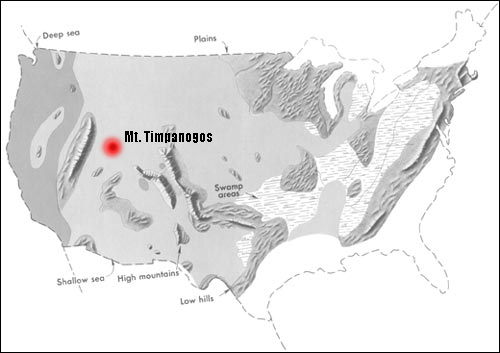
The location of future Mount Timpanogos situated beneath a shallow sea on a map of the United States during the Carboniferous period

The rock which forms the visible surface of Mount Timpanogos is primarily limestone, composed of compacted sediment laid down onto an ancient seafloor over millions of years during the late Carboniferous Period (roughly 300 million years ago). Older rock exists beneath the limestone on the surface. The limestone was subsequently lifted high above sea level and the mountain itself became prominent as the Western valley sank due to basin and range faulting. The most contemporary features of the mountain were formed through recent glacial and water erosion.

== Climate ==
Climate data for Mount Timpanogos 40.3856 N, 111.6428 W, Elevation: 11,060 ft (3,370 m) (1991–2020 normals)
| Month | Jan | Feb | Mar | Apr | May | Jun | Jul | Aug | Sep | Oct | Nov | Dec | Year |
|---|---|---|---|---|---|---|---|---|---|---|---|---|---|
| Mean daily maximum °F (°C) | 26.8 (−2.9) | 26.5 (−3.1) | 31.4 (−0.3) | 36.5 (2.5) | 46.3 (7.9) | 58.8 (14.9) | 67.7 (19.8) | 66.0 (18.9) | 57.2 (14.0) | 44.4 (6.9) | 32.8 (0.4) | 26.3 (−3.2) | 43.4 (6.3) |
| Daily mean °F (°C) | 17.3 (−8.2) | 16.3 (−8.7) | 20.7 (−6.3) | 25.3 (−3.7) | 34.7 (1.5) | 46.0 (7.8) | 54.5 (12.5) | 52.9 (11.6) | 44.6 (7.0) | 33.3 (0.7) | 23.4 (−4.8) | 17.0 (−8.3) | 32.2 (0.1) |
| Mean daily minimum °F (°C) | 7.9 (−13.4) | 6.1 (−14.4) | 10.0 (−12.2) | 14.1 (−9.9) | 23.0 (−5.0) | 33.2 (0.7) | 41.2 (5.1) | 39.9 (4.4) | 32.1 (0.1) | 22.3 (−5.4) | 13.9 (−10.1) | 7.8 (−13.4) | 21.0 (−6.1) |
| Average precipitation inches (mm) | 7.50 (191) | 5.77 (147) | 5.75 (146) | 4.23 (107) | 4.24 (108) | 2.05 (52) | 1.16 (29) | 1.99 (51) | 3.38 (86) | 4.05 (103) | 4.53 (115) | 6.45 (164) | 51.1 (1,299) |
Source: PRISM Climate Group

== Hazards ==
Since 1982 the Timpanogos Emergency Response Team ("TERT") has been established on the mountain on weekends to provide first aid, rescue and communication.

The Timpanogos Glacier is one of the major sources of injury or death to hikers on Timpanogos, particularly when some attempt to "glissade" (or slide rapidly) down the snowfield's surface with the assistance of a shovel or other device to save time descending. There have been many cases of injuries from buried rocks under the snow as well. There have been numerous life flight rescues on the mountain, often caused by this activity. The frequency of these rescues, however, greatly diminished once TERT was established.

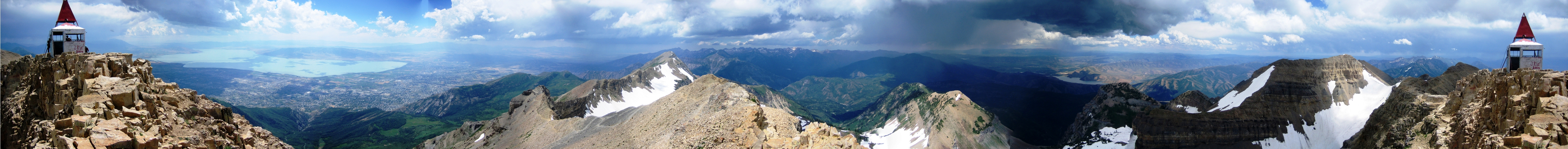
Full 360° panorama from the top of Mount Timpanogos

== Folklore ==
In the early 1900s Eugene Lusk "Timp" Roberts, a professor at Brigham Young University, initiated an annual hike and pageant intended to "sell Timpanogos to the world." One way was to craft his take on native people's folklore. Some observers believe the ridgeline of Mount Timpanogos superficially resembles a sleeping woman. Roberts wrote his folk tale of the maiden Utahna and her sacrifice to her gods with this as the launch point, with one version the basis for a ballet.

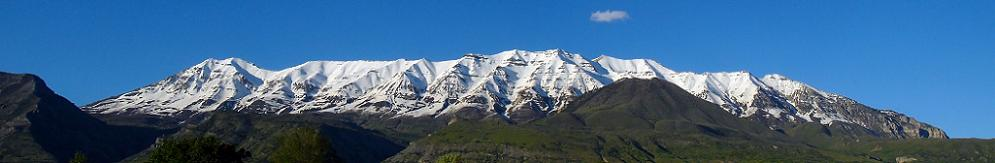
Panorama of Mount Timpanogos as seen from Lindon, Utah.

== See also ==
- List of Ultras of the United States
- Mount Timpanogos Wilderness
- Timpanogos Cave National Monument
- Kings Peak (Utah)
