= Aonach Mòr =

Mountain in Scotland

Coordinates: 56.81240°N 4.96177°W

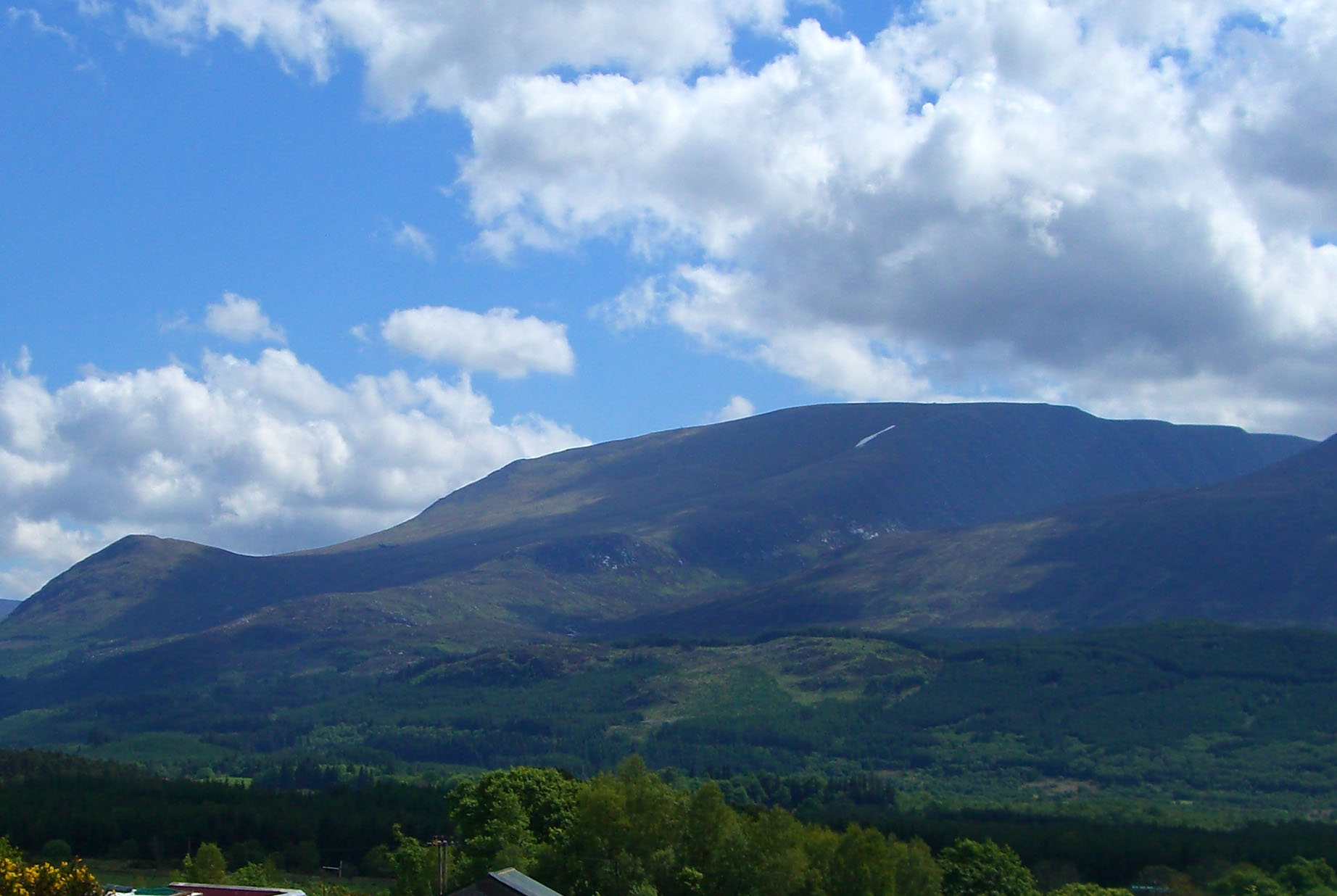
- Aonach Mòr from Banavie

Highest point
- Elevation: 4,006 ft (1,221 m))
- Prominence: c. 440 ft (130 m)
- Parent peak: Aonach Beag
- Listing: Munro

Naming
- English translation: Big ridge
- Language of name: Scottish Gaelic
- Pronunciation: Scottish Gaelic: [ˈɯːnəx ˈmoːɾ] English approximation: OON-əkh-MOR

Geography
- Location: Highland, Scotland
- Parent range: Grampians
- OS grid: NN193729
- Topo map: OS Landranger 41

Aonach Mòr is a mountain in the Scottish Highlands. It is located about two miles (three kilometres) northeast of Ben Nevis on the south side of Glen Spean, near Fort William. The mountain has a summit elevation of 4,006 ft (1,221 m) and is classified as a Munro.

The name Aonach Mòr (big ridge) might suggest that the mountain is taller than its close neighbour to the south, Aonach Beag (small ridge) to which it is linked by a high bealach. However, the names refer to the relative bulk of the mountains when seen from the glen, rather than their elevation; the summit of Aonach Mòr is 43 ft (13 m) lower than the summit of Aonach Beag.

The quickest and shortest ascent route for hikers is to take the gondola to the Snowgoose Terminal at an elevation of 2,133 ft (650 m) and then hike to the summit. More traditionally, the mountain is often climbed from the south from Glen Nevis and in conjunction with Aonach Beag.

== Climate ==
The summit of Aonach Mòr has tundra climate (ET climate in the Köppen classification). The annual mean temperature is 2.9 °C (37.2 °F) and the warmest calendar month of the year, July, is below 10 °C (50 °F). The tree line of the mountain - as with most of highland Scotland - is found at approximately 500 metres (1,600 feet) and above this only stunted tree specimens may be found. Sheltered Coires on the mountain can hold snow throughout the year and this snow can persist from one winter till the next. Aonach Mòr holds one of Scotland's longest-lasting snow fields, located in Coire an Lochain at an elevation of 3,670 ft (1,120 m) (grid reference NN193736). During Cyclone Bodil, Aonach Mòr was hit by winds of 142 mph (229 km/h).

Climate data for Aonach Mòr, elevation: 3,707 ft (1,130 m) (1991-2020)
| Month | Jan | Feb | Mar | Apr | May | Jun | Jul | Aug | Sep | Oct | Nov | Dec | Year |
|---|---|---|---|---|---|---|---|---|---|---|---|---|---|
| Mean daily maximum °C (°F) | 0.3 (32.5) | −0.2 (31.6) | 0.9 (33.6) | 3.2 (37.8) | 6.2 (43.2) | 8.3 (46.9) | 10.3 (50.5) | 10.0 (50.0) | 8.3 (46.9) | 4.8 (40.6) | 2.1 (35.8) | 0.8 (33.4) | 4.6 (40.2) |
| Daily mean °C (°F) | −0.7 (30.7) | −1.7 (28.9) | −1.2 (29.8) | 0.9 (33.6) | 4.1 (39.4) | 6.7 (44.1) | 7.9 (46.2) | 7.9 (46.2) | 7.2 (45.0) | 3.3 (37.9) | 1.3 (34.3) | −1.4 (29.5) | 2.9 (37.1) |
| Mean daily minimum °C (°F) | −1.7 (28.9) | −3.3 (26.1) | −3.3 (26.1) | −1.5 (29.3) | 1.9 (35.4) | 5.1 (41.2) | 5.5 (41.9) | 5.8 (42.4) | 6.1 (43.0) | 1.8 (35.2) | 0.5 (32.9) | −3.6 (25.5) | 1.1 (34.0) |
Source: Met Office

== Nevis Range Ski Area ==
Nevis Range Ski Area
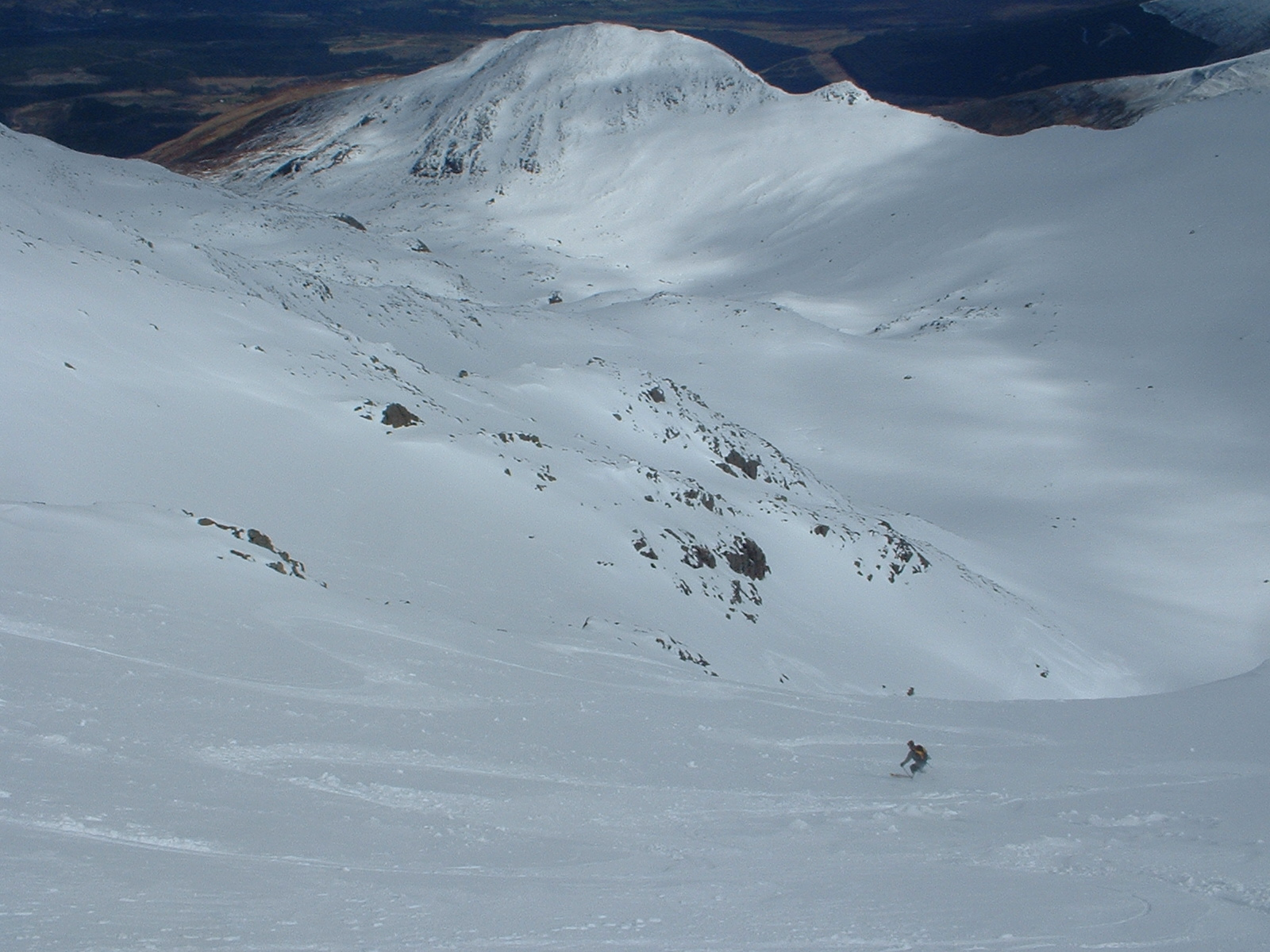
- Aonach Mòr Summit Coire
- Interactive map of Nevis Range Ski Area
- Nearest major city: Fort William – 2 mi (3 km)
- Vertical: 3,708 ft (1,130 m)
- Top elevation: 4,006 ft (1,221 m)
- Base elevation: 298 ft (91 m)
- Skiable area: 630 ha (1,600 acres)
- Trails: 54 total; 8 easy; 16 intermediate; 11 difficult; 8 advanced; 11 back country itineraries
- Longest run: 3 mi (5 km)
- Lift system: 1 gondola, 3 chairlifts, 8 surface
- Lift capacity: 9600 per hour
- Snowfall: 126 in (320 cm)
- Snowmaking: yes
- Night skiing: no
- Website: Nevis Range

The Nevis Range alpine ski area is located on the mountain's northern and eastern slopes. The ski area was opened in 1989. A gondola lift and several chairlifts and ski tows provide access to 35 runs.

These include Scotland's highest pistes and best off piste backcountry skiing itineraries in the back corries of Coire Dubh, Coire an Lochan, Summit Coire and the West Face.

The ski area's name was originally eponymous with the mountain, but later appropriated the name "Nevis" from the mountain's more famous neighbour Ben Nevis. The change sparked some controversy. Whilst Nevis is no doubt easier to pronounce than Aonach Mòr for non-Scottish Gaelic speakers, it was considered by some to represent an erasure of an indigenous name.

== Nevis Range Downhill Mountain Bike Track ==
In summer the gondola is used for access to the top of the downhill mountain biking tracks. The Nevis Range resort has hosted the Mountain Bike World Cup eighteen times (2002, 2003, 2004, 2005, 2006, 2008, 2009, 2010, 2011, 2012, 2013, 2014, 2015, 2016, 2017, 2018, 2019, 2022), and hosted the Mountain Bike World Championships in 2007 and 2023.

The gondola is also used by paragliders to reach launching points.

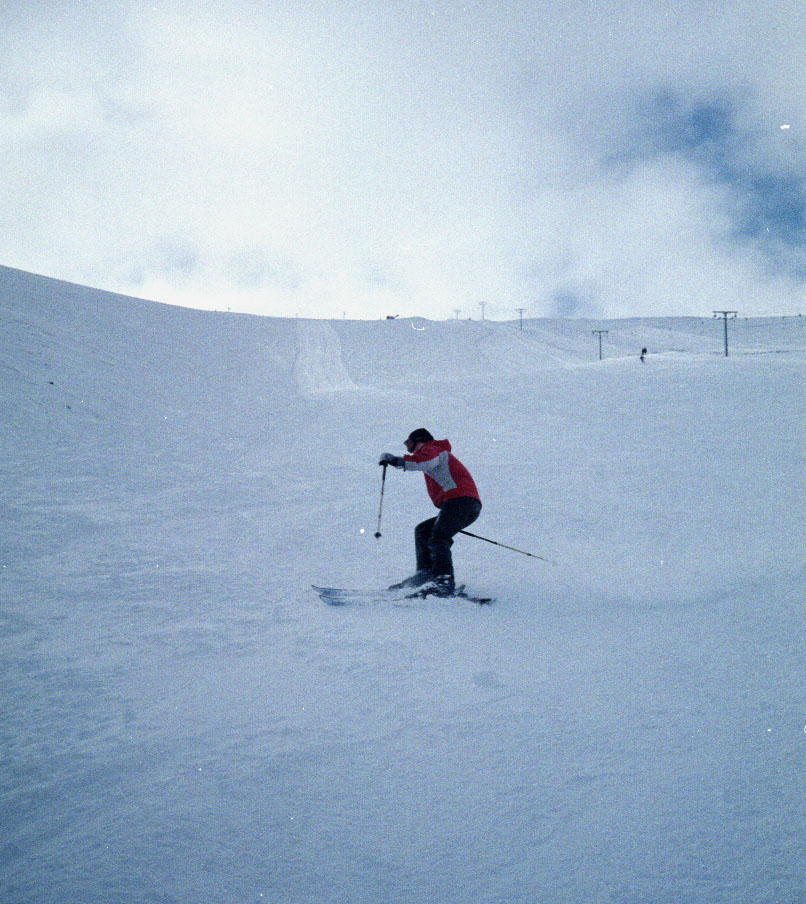
Allt an t-Sneachda or the Snow Goose. The main red run on Aonach Mòr in good snow conditions.

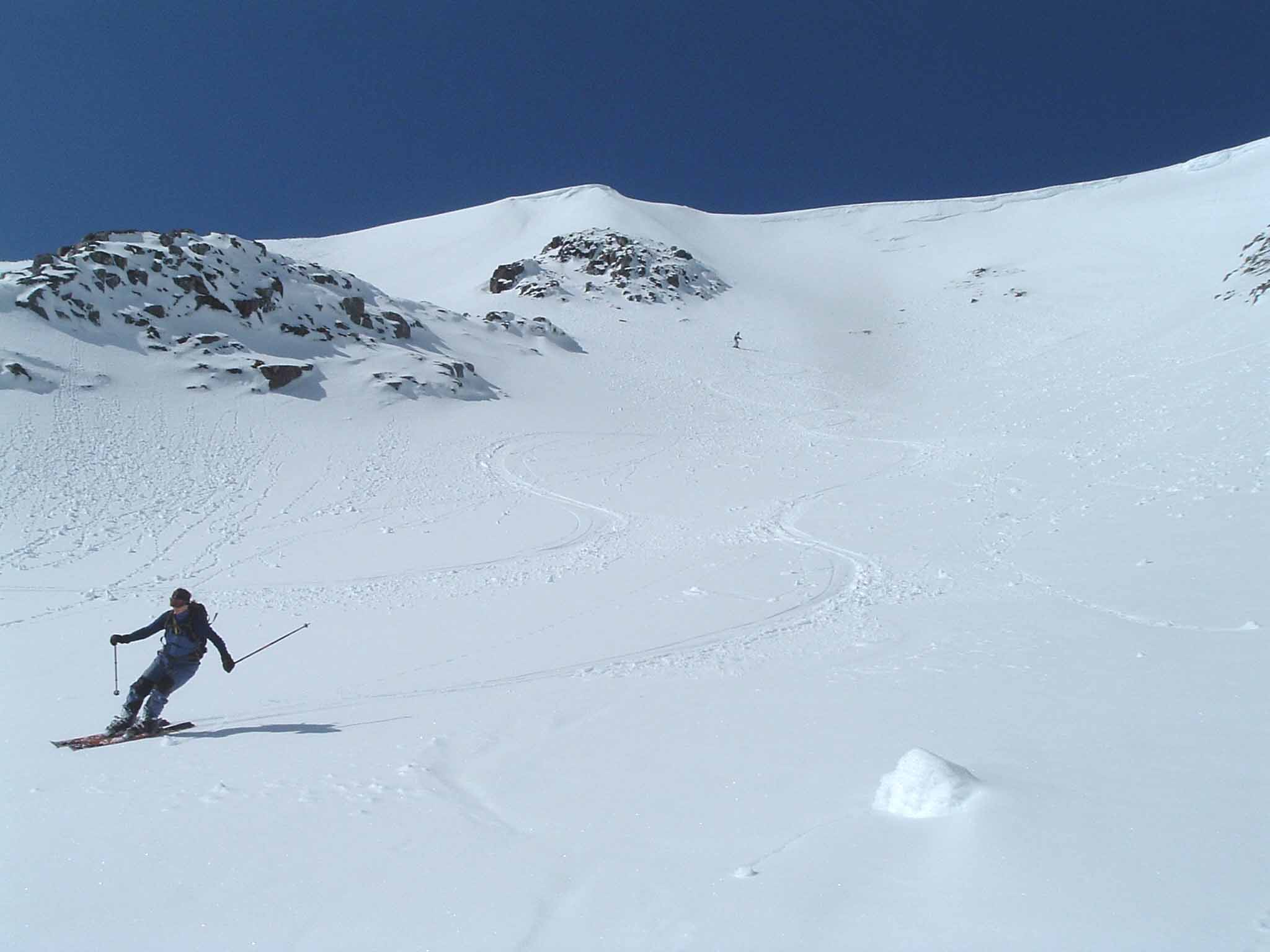
A skier on Summit Coire, one of many off piste runs on Aonach Mòr

== See also ==
- Ben Nevis
- List of Munro mountains
- Mountains and hills of Scotland
