= Athyrium flexile =

Newman's lady-fern

Scientific classification
- Kingdom: Plantae
- Clade: Tracheophytes
- Division: Polypodiophyta
- Class: Polypodiopsida
- Order: Polypodiales
- Suborder: Aspleniineae
- Family: Athyriaceae
- Genus: Athyrium
- Species: A. flexile

Binomial name
- Athyrium flexile Tausch ex Opiz

Species of fern

Athyrium flexile, commonly known as Newman's lady-fern or the flexile lady fern, is a taxon of fern which is endemic to Scotland. It has been regarded as a species, but it is considered to be an ecotype of the Alpine lady fern. This fern is pale to yellow green in colour and has elliptic, double pinnate leaves which are deciduous. This ecotype grows more quickly and matures faster than the Alpine lady fern in substrates which have low levels of nutrients and is outcompeted by the Alpine lady fern in other situations.

It is an upland variety typically found above 750 metres (2,460 ft) on screes made up of siliceous rocks such as quartzite and granite in the Highlands where it is found at only four sites. It is a snow-tolerant species, the snow lie protecting it from frosts. This small, deciduous fern is normally recorded from cool, shaded, north easterly to north westerly facing scree-slopes or where there is scree of large blocks of acidic rocks, particularly in areas where the snow lies late into the Spring and there is melt-water trickling down gullies.

Athyrium flexile was first described in 1853 but may be a stunted variety of Alpine Lady-fern A. distentifolium, a single gene mutation accounting for the difference between the two. It is considered by some experts to be a variant of Alpine Lady-fern (Athyrium distentifolium' var. flexile) rather than a distinct species.

Regarded as nationally scarce and vulnerable, more than 75% of the population is found in the high Cairngorm mountains including the boulder field plateau of Braeriach and in upper Glen Doll. It is found as high as 900 metres (3,000 ft) in Glen Einich.
