= Iain Cameron =

Scottish snow-patch researcher and author

- Occupations: Snow-patch researcher, author
- Known for: Monitoring long-lying snow patches in Scotland
- Notable work: The Vanishing Ice: Diaries of a Scottish Snow Hunter

Iain Cameron is a Scottish outdoors' expert, author, and snow-patch researcher. His long-term monitoring of long-lasting snow patches in the Scottish Highlands has attracted coverage in the Financial Times, The Guardian, and The Independent. He has also been recognised by the National Museums Scotland as part of its contemporary collecting programme.

== Work ==
Cameron's observations have been cited in discussions of climate change and long-term variability in Britain’s upland environments.

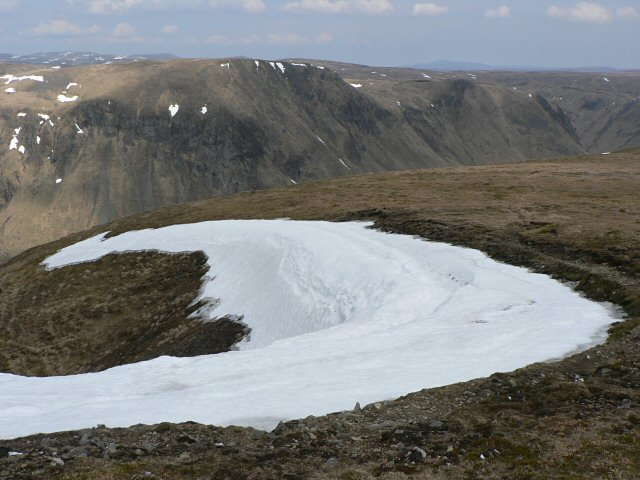
Snow patch on Little Glas Maol

Media coverage has frequently focused on the Sphinx snow patch on Braeriach, often described as the UK’s most persistent snow patch. Cameron is a long-term observer of the site during years when the patch has partially or completely melted.

== Writing ==
Cameron is the author of The Vanishing Ice: Diaries of a Scottish Snow Hunter, published by Vertebrate Publishing in 2021. The book combines field observations with historical and environmental commentary on Scottish snow patches. A review in the Royal Meteorological Society’s journal Weather described the work as a detailed account of snow-patch observation within a broader context.

He has also co-authored peer-reviewed papers that have appeared in the Royal Meteorological Society's 'Weather' journal.

== Media appearances ==
Cameron has discussed his work on BBC Radio Scotland’s Brainwaves, where he was featured in an episode examining the science of snow and ice. His work has also featured in The Times, NBC, and The New York Post.

== Museum collecting ==
In 2022, National Museums Scotland acquired items associated with Cameron’s snow-patch fieldwork, including his laser tape measure and old boots, as part of its contemporary collecting programme documenting environmental change.
