= Aonach Beag =

Mountain in the Scottish Highlands

Coordinates: 56.79999°N 4.95424°W

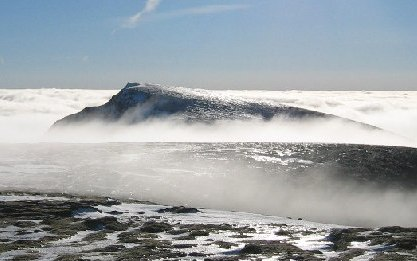
- Aonach Beag from Aonach Mòr

Highest point
- Elevation: 1,234 m (4,049 ft)
- Prominence: 404 m (1,325 ft)
- Parent peak: Ben Nevis
- Listing: Munro, Marilyn

Naming
- English translation: Small ridge
- Language of name: Gaelic
- Pronunciation: Scottish Gaelic: [ˈɯːnəx ˈpek] English approximation: OON-əkh-BEK

Geography
- Location: Lochaber, Scotland
- Parent range: Grampian Mountains
- OS grid: NN197715
- Topo map: OS Landranger 41

Listed summits of Aonach Beag
| Name | Grid ref | Height | Status |
|---|---|---|---|
| Aonach Beag | NN202709 | 1234 m | Munro, Marilyn, Murdo |
| Stob Choire Bhealaich | NN202709 | 1100 m | Munro Top |
| Sgùrr a' Bhuic | NN204701 | 963 m | Munro Top, Murdo |

Aonach Beag is a mountain in the Scottish Highlands. It is located about 3 km east of Ben Nevis on the north side of Glen Nevis, near the town of Fort William. Apart from Ben Nevis, Aonach Beag is the highest peak in the British Isles outside the Cairngorm mountains in eastern Scotland.

Aonach Beag is linked to its close neighbour to the north, Aonach Mòr, by a high saddle or bealach. The name Aonach Beag (small ridge) might imply that this mountain is smaller than Aonach Mòr (big ridge). However, Aonach Beag is higher; the names refer to the relative bulk of the two mountains rather than their elevation.

The easiest way up is to take the gondola lift serving the Nevis Range ski area on Aonach Mòr to an elevation of 650 m and follow the ridge joining the two peaks. More traditionally, the hill is often climbed from the south from Glen Nevis. This way the walker avoids the paraphernalia associated with the ski development. Aonach Beag is often climbed in conjunction with Aonach Mòr.

Aonach Beag's north face holds one of Scotland's longest-lying snow patches (grid reference NN196718), which sits at the bottom of the climb known as 'Queen's View' at an elevation of about 950 m. This patch has been known to last through to the first lasting snows of the new winter, and was present continuously from late 2006 to late November 2011.

== See also ==
- Ben Nevis
- List of Munro mountains
- Mountains and hills of Scotland
