= Nivation =

Geomorphic processes associated with snow patches

Nivation is the set of geomorphic processes associated with snow patches. The primary processes are mass wasting and the freeze-and-thaw cycle, in which fallen snow gets compacted into firn or névé. The importance of the processes covered by the term nivation with regard to the development of periglacial landscapes has been questioned by scholars, and the use of the term is discouraged.

Nivation has come to include various subprocesses related to snow patches which may be immobile or semi-permanent. These sub-processes include erosion (if any) or initiation of erosion, weathering, and meltwater flow from beneath the snow patch.

Weathered particles are moved downslope by creep, solifluction and rill wash. Over time, this leads to the formation of nivation hollows which, when enlarged, can be the beginnings of a cirque.
