= Mount Timpanogos Wilderness =

Wilderness area in Utah County, Utah, U.S.

- IUCN category Ib (wilderness area)
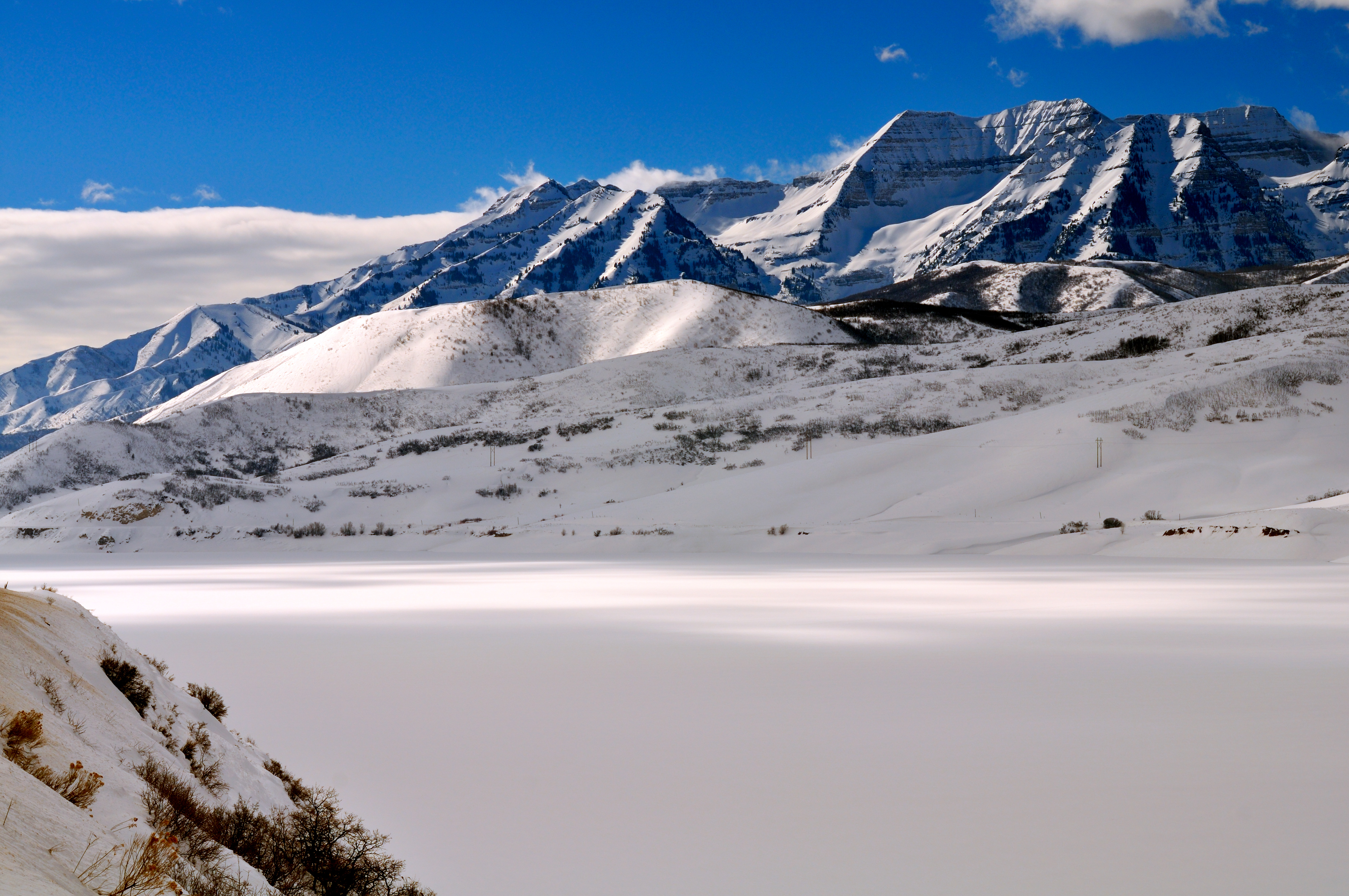
- Mount Timpanogos, Winter 2008

- Location within Utah Location within the United States
- Location: Utah County, Utah; United States
- Nearest city: Pleasant Grove
- Coordinates: 40°23′0″N 111°39′0″W
- Area: 10,518 acres (42.56 km^{2})
- Established: 1984
- Governing body: U.S. Forest Service

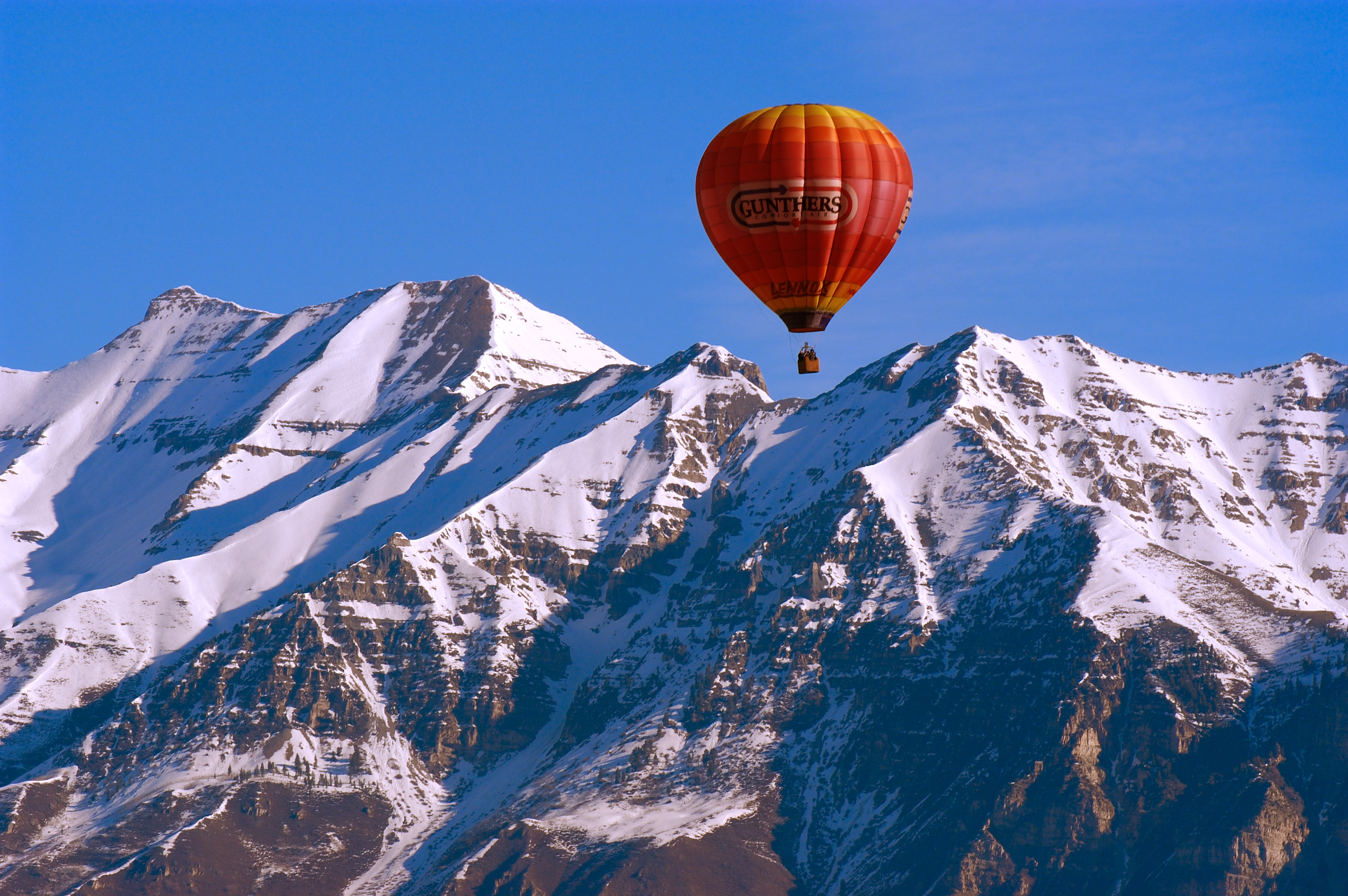
Mount Timpanogos, Winter 2007

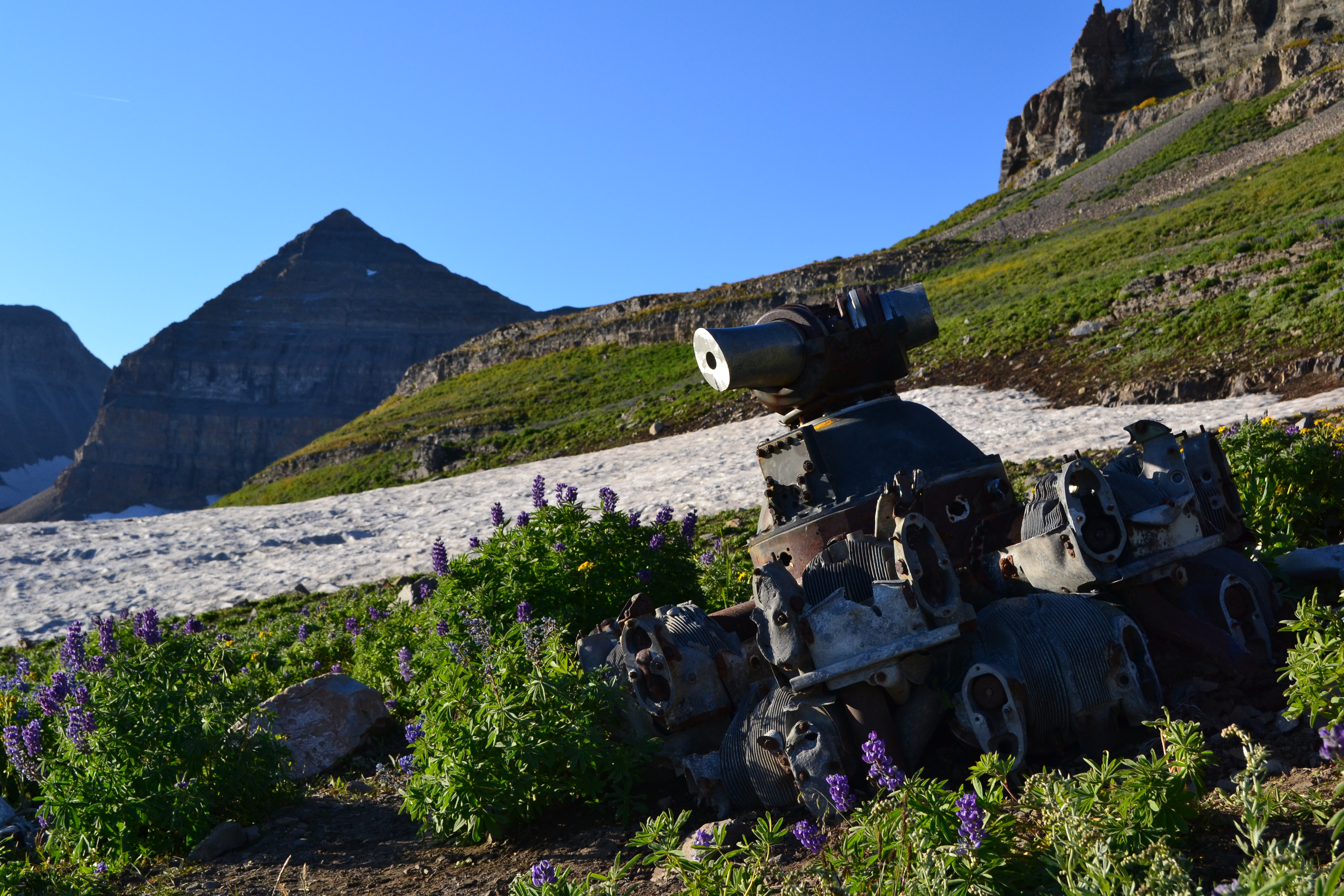
Radial Engine from 1955 B-25 crash site. Mount Timpanogos in background.

Mount Timpanogos Wilderness is a 10,518-acre (42.56 km^{2}) wilderness area protecting Mount Timpanogos and the surrounding area in Utah, United States. It is located in the front range of the Wasatch Mountain Range, between American Fork Canyon on the north and Provo Canyon on the south, within the Uinta-Wasatch-Cache National Forest on the north eastern edge of Utah County, Utah. The wilderness area receives fairly heavy use due to its proximity to the heavily populated cities of Provo and Salt Lake City. It is bordered on the north by the Lone Peak Wilderness.

== Flora and fauna ==
Below the tree line on Mount Timpanogos are vast forests of aspen, Douglas fir, subalpine fir, limber pine, Gambel oak, maple, and chokecherry. Common flowers in the wilderness include forget-me-not, alpine buttercup, bluebell, arnica, larkspur, yarrow, sulfur buckwheat, geranium, and columbine.

Some common wildlife found in Mount Timpanogos Wilderness include Rocky Mountain goat in the Emerald Lake region, as well as mule deer, elk, moose, mountain lion, black bear, and several species of raptor.

== Recreation ==
Due to its close proximity to Salt Lake City and Provo, Mount Timpanogos Wilderness sees a relatively large number of visitors. The most common recreational activity in the wilderness is hiking. There are approximately 17 miles (27 km) of trails from two trailheads: Timpooneke and Aspen Grove. Both lead to the summit of Mount Timpanogos at 11,753 feet (3,582 m).

== B-25 crash site ==
On March 9, 1955, a U.S. Air Force B-25 bomber crashed on the east side of Mount Timpanogos. Bound for March Air Force Base in Riverside, California, the pilot was apparently disoriented by poor weather conditions. Three crewmembers and two passengers died in the crash. A 1-mile (1.6 km) trail to the crash site leaves the main Timpooneke trail at the lip of Timpanogos Basin.

== See also ==
- List of U.S. Wilderness Areas
- Wilderness Act
