= Protalus rampart =

Depositional landform

A protalus rampart (or pronival rampart) is a depositional landform of periglacial origin. It forms as rock debris falls onto a steep snow slope from a cliff above and slides down the snow surface to come to a rest at the foot of the slope. Over a long period of time, sufficient material can accumulate in this way to produce a distinct bank of stony material which, long after the snowbed has melted away, remains as a rampart (a bank or mound similar to a manmade rampart). The debris may also accumulate through avalanching or landslide. Protalus ramparts may be distinguished from glacial moraines by their lack of rock fragments with glacial abrasion or striations, although many small moraines have stones which have not undergone any sublglacial entrainment but deposited entirely from the cliffs above in the manner of a rock glacier. The morphology of the site may also suggest it being unfavourable for the development of a glacier, but suitable for this mechanism.

Protalus ramparts are recorded in the Cairngorms and northwest Highlands of Scotland. An especially large example on the north side of Baosbheinn measures 1 km in length and reaches a height of 55 m. It is thought to result from a major rock slope failure, however evidence leads some to class it as a protalus rock glacier. Several features amongst the mountains of the Brecon Beacons National Park have been interpreted by some authors as protalus ramparts but as moraines by others. The depositional ridge of Fan Fechan beneath Fan Hir, formerly thought to be a rampart due to its linear nature paralleling the line of the cliff above is now considered to be a moraine. A range of glacial or snowbank features, including protalus ramparts, have been described from locations in the Andes
