= Rock glacier =

Glacial landform

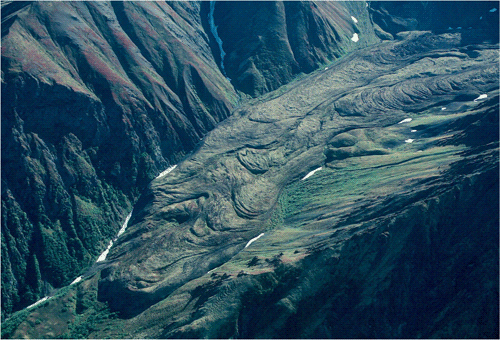
Rock glacier with multiple flow lobes, Chugach Mountains, Alaska

Rock glaciers are glaciers shielded from melting by a layer of non-icy rocks, allowing them to stay frozen in locations where they would otherwise melt. They consist either of angular rock debris frozen in interstitial ice, former "true" glaciers overlain by a layer of talus, or something in between. Rock glaciers are normally found at high latitudes and/or elevations, and may extend outward and downslope from talus cones, glaciers or terminal moraines of glaciers. The early textbook 'Characteristics of Existing Glaciers' refers to the varied, sometimes confusing, names given to these features; 'stone rivers', 'rock flows', 'rock streams' and 'rock glaciers', and includes a map and two photographs of 'rock streams' from the Silverton area of Colorado from the US Geological Surveyors Ernest Howe and W Cross. About the same time, Stephen Capps was surveying in the Wrangell Mountains, Alaska and reported similar landforms in the McCarthy area. Although a variety of names seemed to have been used in the USGS at this time, it is 'rock glacier' that is now generally used.

There are two models of rock glacier formation and flow: permafrost rock glaciers (sometimes termed talus-derived rock glaciers), and glacial rock glaciers, such as the Timpanogos Glacier [40.3847,-111.6415] in Utah, which may be found where glaciers once existed. A rock glacier has formed with rock debris covering a small glacier on Mt. St. Helens [46.2074,-122.1838]. Possible Martian rock glacier features have been identified by the Mars Reconnaissance Orbiter spacecraft. A rock glacier, especially if its origin is unclear, can be considered as a discrete debris accumulation. Rock avalanches can be misidentified as rock glaciers, or may evolve into them.

== Formation ==
The two known factors that must be present in order to create rock glaciers are low ice velocity and permafrost. Most glacial rock glaciers are created by the recession of debris covered glaciers. Glacial rock glaciers are often found in cirque basins where rocky debris falls off the steep sides and accumulates on ice glaciers. As glaciers shrink, they become increasingly covered with rock debris. Eventually, the glacier ice may be completely covered by the debris, although the ice core continues to flow.

With the exception of ice-cored rock glaciers, rock glaciers are a periglacial/permafrost process. This means that they are a nonglacial landform associated with cold climates, particularly with various aspects of frozen ground. Permafrost rock glaciers require permafrost-derived ice instead of glacial ice in order to form. Instead, they are caused by continuous freezing occurring within a talus lobe. Permafrost rock glaciers can form from the alternation of rock debris incoming with autumn firn or avalanche snow.

Nearby cliffs are in many cases a requirement for the formation of rock glaciers, and as such many rock glaciers form in valleys steepened by glacier erosion. Rock masses of rock glaciers have been found to make up different rock types depending on the local geology. These rock types include andesite, basalt, granite, porphyry, quartzite, and sandstone.

Ordinary glaciers can override rock glaciers, acquiring some of its material and properties. More usually, rock glaciers originate from weathered rock debris progressively covering an existing glacier. Typically in the European Alps, this is post Little Ice Age

== Movement ==
Rock glaciers move downslope by deformation of the ice contained within them, causing their surface to resemble those of glaciers. Rock glaciers may flow or creep at a very slow rate, in part dependent on the thickness of ice present. Surface velocities are generally less than 2m/a, although this depends where measurements have been taken on the length of the rock glacier.

Some rock glaciers can reach lengths of three kilometres (2 mi) and can have terminal embankments 60 m (200 ft) high. Blocks on the surface can be up to 8 m (26 ft) in diameter. Flow features on the surface of rock glaciers may develop from:

- Deformation of a glacier ice core.
- Movement of the debris cover along the debris-ice interface.
- Deformation from a period of glacial advance.
- Changes in the hydrologic balance.

Their growth and formation is subject to some debate, with three main theories:

- A glacier origin, where a small glacier has been buried by weathered debris that has largely prevented melting.
- A permafrost origin, which implies that the features are related to the presence of permafrost ice rather than a glacier core;
- A mass wasting or landslide origin, which does not require the presence of ice and suggests a sudden catastrophic origin with little subsequent movement.

According to recent studies, rock glaciers positively influence the streams around them.

Subject to climate variation, rock glaciers in proximity tend to have a highly synchronous movement pattern over a short time scale; over long term, however, the relationship between rock glacier velocity and climate difference may not be as pronounced, due to the influences of topographic factors and lack of ice or debris budget within the glacier body.

== Human use ==
Major mines in Chile in areas of rock glaciers. Catedral is a prospect.

Rock glaciers in the Chilean Andes help supply the water for much of Chile, including the capital of Santiago. Mining operations in the high mountains have led to the degradation and destruction of more than two rock glaciers. Several copper mines dump their waste rock onto rock glaciers, which results in faster melting and higher velocity movement of these rock glaciers. The dumping of waste rock on the rock glaciers may lead to their destabilization. In 2004, protesting irrigation farmers and environmentalists changed rules so new mining projects can no longer damage or alter rock glaciers in Chile. In Chile, the mines that have impacted rock glaciers the most are those of Los Pelambres, Pascua Lama and the adjoining mines of Andina and Los Bronces.

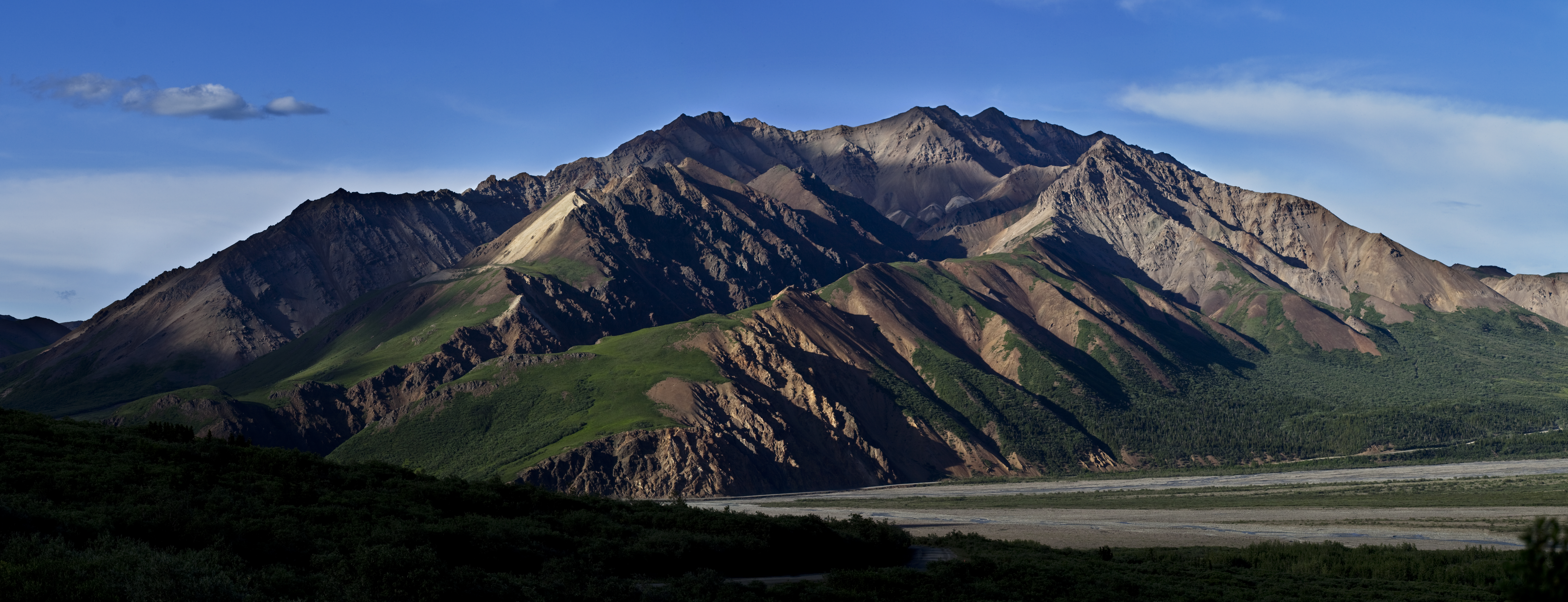
Polychrome Mountain, site of the Pretty Rocks Landslide

Parts of the only road into Denali National Park and Preserve in Alaska are built on a rock glacier known as "Pretty Rocks". In late summer 2021 the road had to be closed due to accelerating rockslides in that area, sometimes sliding up to 25 centimetres (10 in) in a single day, apparently due to climate change. In Colorado, the large landslide, Slumgullion Earthflow has a plan-form more typical of a rock glacier but it does not flow from a glacial cirque.
