= Chamber Music Conference and Composers' Forum of the East =

The Chamber Music Conference and Composers' Forum of the East (CMC) is a summer conference that brings together amateur musicians, professional faculty, and composers-in-residence to study and play chamber music. The CMC was founded in 1946, and most of its summer sessions have been held at Bennington College in Bennington, Vermont. After the 2019 session, the CMC announced its relocation to the campus of Colgate University in Hamilton, New York, to begin with its 75th anniversary session in 2022. It has returned to the Colgate campus every summer since then. There was a limited 2021 program at Bennington College. (The 2020 in-person program was canceled due to the COVID-19 pandemic.)

== History ==
The conference was founded in 1946 as a program of Middlebury College. Alan Carter, founder and director, was a professor of music at Middlebury. He was also the founder and music director of the Vermont Symphony Orchestra (then the Vermont State Symphony Orchestra).

== Conference program ==
Throughout the conference week, participants attend coaching sessions on assigned chamber music works. They may also attend lectures and seminars. Composers-in-residence are commissioned to write new works that are played by participants and faculty during the conference weeks. The faculty present free performances that are open to the public.

== Notable CMC composers-in-residence ==
- Esther Williamson Ballou
- Derek Bermel
- Lisa Bielawa
- Susan Botti
- Henry Brant
- Louis Calabro
- Evan Chambers
- Chou Wen-chung
- Donald Crockett - Senior Composer-in-Residence, beginning 2002
- Ingolf Dahl
- Mario Davidovsky
- Robert Dick
- Donald Erb
- Gabriela Lena Frank
- Kenneth Frazelle
- Sean Friar
- Sarah Gibson
- Daniel Strong Godfrey
- Roger Goeb
- Stephen Hartke
- Ted Hearne
- Jennifer Higdon
- Gabriel Jenks
- Lei Liang
- Otto Luening
- Steven Mackey
- Sky Macklay
- Caroline Mallonée
- Harold Meltzer
- Paul Moravec
- Jeffrey Mumford
- Lionel Nowak
- Elizabeth Ogonek
- George Rochberg
- Patsy Rogers
- Frederic Rzewski
- Laura Schwendinger
- Allen Shawn
- Judith Shatin
- Sean Shepherd
- Roberto Sierra
- Halsey Stevens
- Theodore Strongin
- Virgil Thomson
- Joan Tower
- Vladimir Ussachevsky
- Edgard Varèse
- Dan Welcher
- Scott Wheeler
- Amy Williams
- Charles Wuorinen
- Chen Yi
- Nina C. Young

== Notable CMC faculty ==
- Phillip Bush - Music Director, 2007-2016
- Alan Carter - Music Director, 1946-1975
- Jack Glick - Music Director, 1982-1994
- Shem Guibbory - Music Director, 1998-2007
- Kermit Moore
- Maxine Neuman
- Bertram Turetzky
- Tobias Werner - Music Director, 2016–2024
- Laura Metcalf - Music Director, 2025-present
