= New England Lost Ski Areas Project =

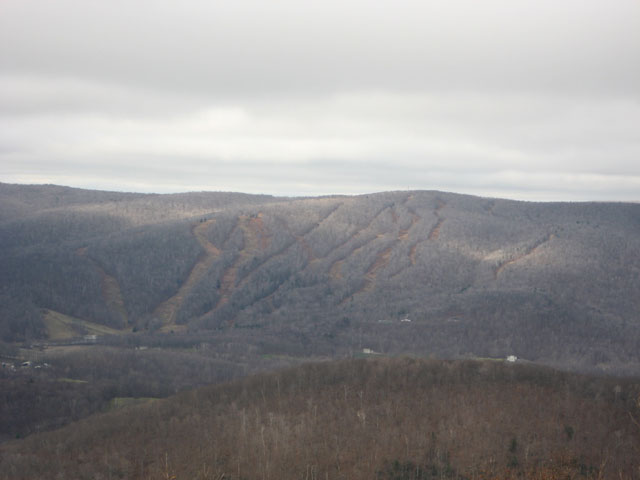
A 2006 view of the ski resort on Brodie Mountain in Massachusetts, which closed in 2002.

New England Lost Ski Areas Project (NELSAP) is an organization that concerns the history of downhill skiing areas, mostly in the northeastern United States. Started as a website in 1998, it has also organized hikes, research projects, and lectures in recent years.

== Mission ==
While the core mission of NELSAP is to "celebrate the history of lost ski areas in New England", the organization also works to document lost ski areas in other regions, such as New York and even Afghanistan.

Another mission which has emerged over time is the effort to document and promote lesser-known open ski areas. A recent project has begun to "Adopt a Ski Area", in which contributors visit a lesser-known hill and write a trip report documenting their experience and the overall feel of the ski area.

== History ==
NELSAP was started in October 1998 by Jeremy Davis. The site has grown over the years to list 605 closed New England ski areas and 82 outside the region (as of 2022).

The project's data is collected from a variety of sources, including old brochures, ski area guides, personal stories, and recent visits. NELSAP has an alliance with the New England Ski Museum.

The site has grown to have national recognition and has been subject of newspaper articles and television reports.

== Books ==
Multiple books about defunct ski areas have been authored by founder Jeremy Davis, published by The History Press.

- Lost Ski Areas of the White Mountains (2008)
- Lost Ski Areas of Southern Vermont (2010)
- Lost Ski Areas of the Adirondacks (2012)
- Lost Ski Areas of the Berkshires (2018)
