= Sage City Symphony =

US orchestra

Sage City Symphony is a community orchestra based in Bennington, Vermont, United States, that tackles ambitious works from the traditional repertoire as well as commissioning new works. It was formed in 1972 by its first musical director, noted composer Louis Calabro, who was on the faculty of Bennington College. Sage City Symphony maintains its relationship with the college, relying on the campus for rehearsal and performance space.

The symphony attracts amateur as well as professional musicians without the requirement of auditions, drawn from Vermont, Massachusetts and New York states. It presents four concerts a year, starting rehearsals in September for a performance featuring a major orchestral work in November. The symphony restarts rehearsals after the New Year for three concerts presented February through May: a Chamber Concert, Youth Concert and a final Spring concert featuring a significant orchestral work.

The symphony is led by music director and conductor Michael Finckel. It is governed/supported by a working volunteer Board which appoints a Manager and a Librarian. Like the players, board members come from surrounding areas of Vermont, Massachusetts and New York states. The board contains a mix of orchestral players and longtime supporters from the business and academic community.

== Performance information ==
Performance dates and programs are announced on Sage City Symphony's web site. In addition they are reported in area media outlets.

These media outlets have included: Bennington Banner in Bennington, Vermont, North Adams Transcript in North Adams, Massachusetts, the Tri-State Pennysaver News in Bennington, Vermont, Eastwick Press in eastern Rensselaer County of New York, the Vermont News Guide, Vermont Public Radio (VPR), WAMC in Albany, New York, WMHT-FM in Schenectady, New York, and Catamount Access TV in Bennington, Vermont.

Performances are recorded by Catamount Access TV (CAT-TV) and aired subsequently. Most performances for the last several years have been recorded by Joel Patterson of Mountaintop Studios and rendered onto CD or made available for file sharing.

== Funding ==
The symphony is a not for profit 501(c)(3), registered in the State of Vermont, and relies entirely on donations and grants. Grant sources have included the National Endowment for the Humanities, the Fund for North Bennington, the Vermont Arts Council and the Vermont Community Foundation. The symphony enjoys steady support from individuals, local Foundations and business donors. The symphony also solicits sponsors for concerts, which have included a range of enterprises such as the Bank of Bennington, the Vermont Country Store, Stewart's Shops and more.

== Conductor ==
The symphony is currently directed by Michael Finckel. Michael Finckel started his studies with his parents, cellist George Finckel and pianist Marianne ("Willie") Finckel. George Finckel and Willie Finckel were on faculty at Bennington College. Michael Finckel attended Oberlin College Conservatory and Bennington College where he studied composition, conducting and orchestration with Louis Calabro and Henry Brant.

He has taught cello and composition at Bennington and Marymount Colleges and at Princeton and Cornell Universities. As a member of the faculty of the Vermont Governor's Institute on the Arts in the 1990s he taught composition to gifted junior and high school students throughout Vermont. Michael Finckel has an active career as a soloist and chamber musician, composer, teacher and conductor based in New York City, performing with orchestral and chamber ensembles across the country and in Europe. He has a strong background in contemporary music, as well as the traditional repertoire. He has regularly collaborated with New York's leading new music ensembles and performed under the direction of Leonard Bernstein and Pierre Boulez.

Michael Finckel performs and coaches each year at the Composer's Conference sponsored by the Chamber Music Center of Wellesley College in Massachusetts, and at the Chamber Music Conference and Composer's Forum of the East at Bennington College.

== Community connections ==
Sage City Symphony has long had an annual Youth Concert featuring young soloists or performances with local youth groups. Past performances have included works with the symphony and the Bennington Children's Chorus and the Green Mountain Youth Orchestra. This tradition goes back to the symphony's founder, Louis Calabro, with works such as Child's Play for children's chorus and piano composed in 1990 and performed by the symphony again in 2009.

The symphony started a Young Composers Project in 2009. The symphony pays a stipend to a mentor to help young people prepare works for orchestral performance, alternating each year between reaching out to area high school or college age students. The high schools from which students have been drawn for this project include the Hoosac School in Hoosick Falls, New York, the Mount Anthony Union High School (Miles Yucht, Alive) in Bennington, the Long Trail School in Dorset, Vermont, Pittsfield High School in Pittsfield, Massachusetts, and the Mount Greylock Regional High School in Williamstown, Massachusetts. The college students have been primarily drawn from Bennington College.

One of the compositions by a high school student, Wind Blows, was placed on YouTube by its composer. One of the high school composers from the 2009 project, Patrick Madden, received the Daniel Pearl Berkshire Scholarship.

A recording of The Tinkerer, a piece from Sage City Symphony's March 2014 Youth Concert, has been made available on musescore.com by its composer, Zack Weishaus, along with an animated score.

== Major works performed ==
Sage City Symphony has performed major works from the traditional repertoire including the following.

- Daphnis and Chloe, by Ravel
- Symphony No. 1, by Mahler
- Petrushka, 1911 Version, by Stravinsky
- Symphonie Fantastique, by Berlioz
- Symphony in Three Movements by Igor Stravinsky
- Beethoven's Ninth Symphony, arr. by Henry Brant
- La Mer by Debussy
- Symphony No. 9 in E Minor, From the New World by Antonín Dvořák
- Mathis der Maler by Paul Hindemith
- Piano Concerto No 2, by Rachmaninoff, featuring Wu Han soloist
- Symphony No. 2 in E Minor, opus 27 by Sergei Rachmaninoff
- Symphony no. 4 in D minor, Op 120, by Schumann
- Symphony No. 4 by Shostakovich

== Commissioned works ==
Sage City Symphony commissions a new work each year. These have included the following. Some of these composers including Zeke Hecker. Bruce Hobson, and Dennis Báthory-Kitsz have been founders and members of the Consortium of Vermont Composers, founded in 1988 and recognized in a Proclamation by Governor Shumlin making 2011 the Year of the Composer.

- Commissioned work XLIV in five movements by Rolando Gori performed Sunday May 17, 2015
- Commissioned work Kora Saba: For Djembe and Chamber Orchestra, by Michael Wimberly, performed Sunday November 16, 2014
- Commissioned work Concerto for Cello and Orchestra, by Allen Shawn, premiered 1999 and performed again in May 2013, soloist Maxine Neuman
- Commissioned work Table of Toys and Numbers, by Nick Brooke
- Commissioned work by John Eagle
- Three for Orchestra and Hyperpiano by Randall Neal, premiere November 14, 2010
- Concerto for Flute and Orchestra by Robert Singley premiere May 3, 2009
- Work for orchestra and percussion by Derrik Jordan, premiere spring 2008
- Mountain Paths by Bruce Hobson, premiere May 28, 2000
- Commissioned work "Softening Cries" by Dennis Báthory-Kitsz premiere June 6, 1992, under the direction of T. L. Read
- Work by Susan Hurley, 1988–1990
- The Birthmark by Zeke Hecker premiere 1989
- Blood Memory: A Long Quiet After the Call by Tina Davidson premiered June 1, 1986
- Symphony for Orchestra with Piano Obbligato by T.L. Read, premiere 1986
- Missa Brevis for SATB chorus, strings (piano reduction for rehearsal), opus 72 (1983), by Louis Calabro written for the Bennington College Chorus Recorded 1984: Sage City Symphony
- Tundra by Michael Finckel
- Sonnet for Baritone and Orchestra, Text: John Keats, baritone Wayne Dalton, by Vivian Fine. Conducted by Louis Calabro. Premiere December 5, 1976.
- Concerto for Percussion Quartet and Orchestra by Marta Ptaszynska, work listed as premiered by Sage City Symphony under Louis Calabro on October 10, 1974

== Chamber works performed in 2009-2010 ==
- Symphony No. 13 in D Major by Joseph Haydn
- Serenade in D Minor, Opus 44 by Antonín Dvořák
- Horn Concerto No. 2 in E flat K 412 by Mozart, John Eagle soloist
- Jupiter Symphony by Mozart
- Suite from Gesta Romanorum by Robert Zimmerman
- Elegy for Cello and Orchestra, Opus 24 by Faure
- Grand Duo Concertante for Violin and Double Bass by Giovanni Bottesini, soloists Kaori Washiyama and Robert Zimmerman double bass
- Five Greek Songs by Maurice Ravel, soprano soloist Kerry Ryer-Parke
- Cantique de Jean Racine by Faure
