= Mount Greylock Regional School =

Location
- 1781 Cold Spring Road; Williamstown, Massachusetts 01267 01267; United States; 42°40′15″N 73°14′28″W

Information
- Former name: Mount Greylock Regional High School
- Type: Public middle and high school
- School district: Mount Greylock Regional School District
- Principal: Jacob Schutz
- Teaching staff: 46.93 (FTE)
- Grades: 7–12
- Enrollment: 539 (2024-2025)
  - Grade 7: 105
  - Grade 8: 112
  - Grade 9: 97
  - Grade 10: 89
  - Grade 11: 66
  - Grade 12: 68
  - SP: 2
- Campus type: Rural
- Colors: Red and white
- Team name: Mounties
- Newspaper: The Greylock Echo
- Communities served: Williamstown, Hancock, Lanesborough, New Ashford
- Website: www.mgrhs.org

Mount Greylock Regional School is a public middle and high school in Williamstown, Massachusetts, within the foothills of Mount Greylock. The school is part of the Mount Greylock Regional School District.

== History ==
Mount Greylock Regional School is located on the site of a former airport in southern Williamstown. The school serves the community of Williamstown, as well as nearby Hancock, Lanesborough, and New Ashford.

Mount Greylock School has a chapter of the National Honor Society, and a local partnership with the Sage City Symphony.

== Athletics ==
Mount Greylock Regional School ski teams have utilized Prospect Mountain in Vermont. The Ephs of Williams College use the high school facilities for cross country. Mount Greylock's boys Nordic ski team has won a state record 22 state championships, including seven straight from 2011 to 2017. The Mounties won in 2020, there was no state title in 2021, won again in 2022 and 2023, lost to Newton South in 2024, and won again in 2025. On the girls side, Mount Greylock won its 14th state title in 2025, giving the school back-to-back state titles after winning 2024. The Mount Greylock volleyball team was one of the most consistent teams in the state from 2021-on, making it to the PVIAC Class C Western Massachusetts Volleyball Final in 2022, losing to Frontier. The Mounties then went undefeated in 2023, with a perfect 25-0 campaign that included a Class C Western Mass. Title win over county-rival Lenox, the No. 1 overall seed in the Massachusetts Interscholastic Athletic Association Division V State tournament and a championship over Bourne in that game. Mount Greylock won the Class C title again in 2024, beating Lenox in five sets.

== Athletic state championships ==
Note: Some state championships from the 2024-2025 school year may not be included as some of the MIAA state championship archives haven't been updated.

Sport	Year(s)
MIAA sanctioned sports
Boys' Nordic skiing (22)	1992, 1994, 1997, 1998, 2000, 2001, 2002, 2006, 2007, 2008, 2009, 2011, 2012, 2013, 2014, 2015, 2016, 2017, 2020, 2022, 2023, 2025
Girls' Nordic skiing (14)	1989, 1992, 1995, 2008, 2009, 2010, 2011, 2012, 2016, 2017, 2018, 2019, 2024, 2025
Girls' cross country (6)	1990, 1992, 1993, 1994, 2017, 2021
Football (5)	1999, 2000, 2010, 2011, 2012
Girls' alpine skiing (5)	1998, 2000, 2001, 2002, 2003
Boys' soccer (2)	1995, 2008
Boys' alpine skiing (2)	1995, 1996
Girls' volleyball (1)	2023
Baseball (1)	2022

== Notable alumni ==
- Jonah Bayliss – baseball player
- Ali Fedotowsky – journalist
- Chuck Hunt – businessman
- Clara Claiborne Park – educator
- Chris Conroy - Major League Baseball umpire
- Kurt Tong - diplomat

== See also ==
- List of high schools in Massachusetts
