= Mallonee =

Mallonee is a surname. Notable people with the surname include:

- Ben Mallonee (1894–1978), American baseball player
- Bill Mallonee (born 1955), American singer-songwriter
- C. Gardner Mallonee (1903–1980), American Olympian and college football and lacrosse player and coach
- Caroline Mallonée (born 1975), American composer
- Dennis Mallonee (born 1955), American comic books writer
- Jule Mallonee (1900–1934), American baseball player
- Devin Mallonee (born 1991), Author and founder of the Mallonee Foundation
