= Jiminy Peak =

Jiminy Peak may refer to:

- Jiminy Peak, the southern high point of Potter Mountain (Taconic Mountains) in western Massachusetts
- Jiminy Peak (ski area), a ski area located on that peak.
