= Berkshire Wind Power Project =

Wind farm in Massachusetts, United States

The Berkshire Wind Power Project
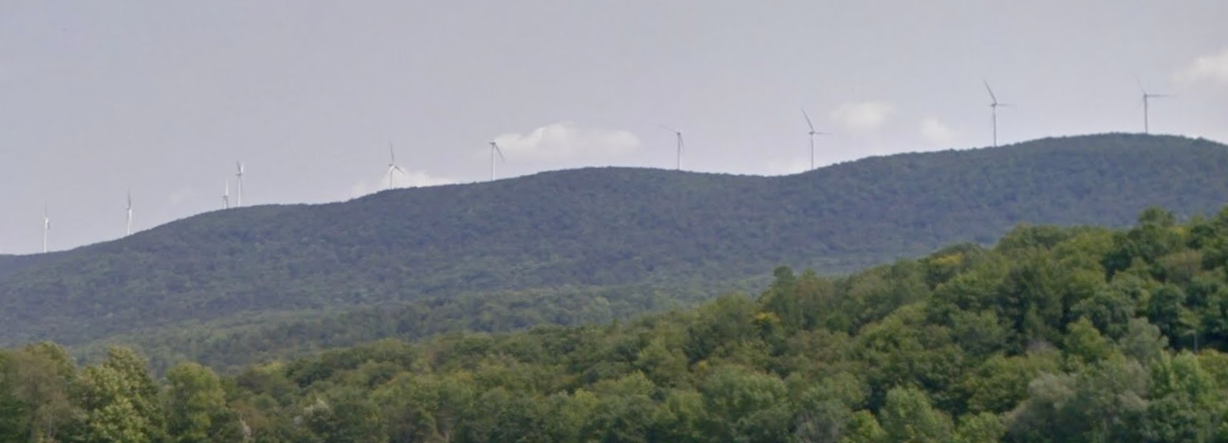
- Country: United States
- Location: Hancock, Massachusetts
- Coordinates: 42°34′45″N 73°16′26″W
- Status: Operational
- Construction began: September, 2009
- Commission date: May, 2011
- Construction cost: US $64.7 million
- Owner: Berkshire Wind Power Co-op

Wind farm
- Type: Onshore
- Hub height: 262 feet (80 m)
- Rotor diameter: 252 feet (77 m)
- Site area: 75 acres
- Site elevation: 2,500 feet (760 m)

Power generation
- Units operational: 12
- Make and model: GE Wind Energy: 1.5 MW
- Nameplate capacity: 19.6 MW
- Capacity factor: 40%
- Annual net output: 52,500 MWh

External links
- Website: www.berkshirewindcoop.org

The Berkshire Wind Power Project is a wind farm on Brodie Mountain in Hancock, Massachusetts. Owned and operated by the Berkshire Wind Power Cooperative Corporation, it is the second largest wind farm in Massachusetts, with 12 GE 1.5 MW wind turbines and a total installed capacity of 19.6 MW. The Berkshire wind power project became fully operational in 2011, and provides enough electricity to power 7,800 homes annually.

== Project details ==
The project consists of 10 GE Wind Energy 1.5 MW wind turbines on Brodie Mountain in Hancock, Massachusetts. Each turbine produces 1.5 MW, the site has the capacity to produce 15 MW; this is enough energy to supply approximately 7,800 average homes in the region annually. The towers are 213 feet (65 m) tall, with 121 feet (37 m) blades. From base to vertically positioned blade tip, they will be approximately 334 feet (102 m). Wind speeds atop Brodie Mountain average 8 m/s (18 mph), one of the best inland wind sites in Massachusetts, making it a Class 6 resource on the American Wind Energy Scale of 1 to 7. The turbines begin generating energy at wind speeds as low as 8 mph (13 km/h), and produce the maximum power output when winds blow above 30 mph (48 km/h). The maximum rotor speed is 20 rpm. The project was built with turbines manufactured at facilities all across the U.S. The power generated is delivered to the New England grid through the local utility.

Reed & Reed was the EPC contractor for the project. Reed & Reed was responsible for the civil, foundation and electrical designs, Quality Control, Safety Management and all phases of construction.

=== Environmental impact ===
Berkshire Wind Power Project offsets approximately 612,000 metric tons of carbon dioxide per year relative to conventional electricity generation. That is equivalent to the estimated annual emissions produced by consuming more than 1.17 million barrels of oil.

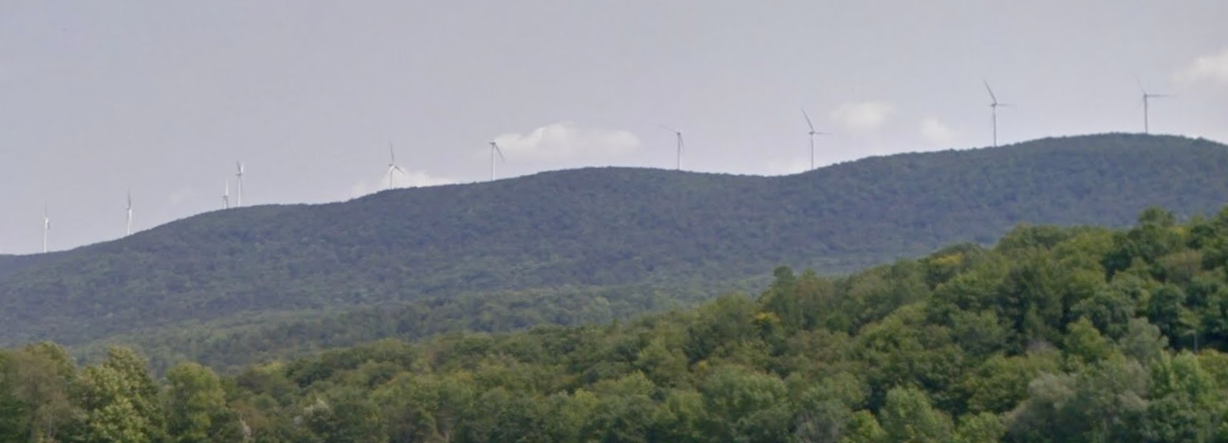
Berkshire Wind Power Project

=== Economic impact ===
Approximately US $109,000 per year in annual payments in lieu of taxes are made to the Town of Hancock, changing with inflation, amounting to approximately US$2.1 million over the life of the agreement. In addition the project created 50 full-time jobs, through the use of 20 Massachusetts companies, and purchase many products and services locally.

== Berkshire Wind Power Cooperative Corporation ==
Berkshire Wind Power Cooperative Corporation is a non-profit entity created by 14 Massachusetts municipal utilities and the Massachusetts Municipal Wholesale Electric Company (MMWEC). In addition to MMWEC, members of the Cooperative include the consumer-owned, municipal utilities serving the communities of Ashburnham, Boylston, Groton, Holden, Hull, Ipswich, Marblehead, Paxton, Peabody, Shrewsbury, Sterling, Templeton, Wakefield, and West Boylston. Unlike other investor-owned utilities, in Massachusetts, municipal utilities are not required to comply with the Massachusetts renewable portfolio standard. Though each of these public power utilities have embraced the state's call for renewable energy development voluntarily because their customers support renewable energy development, these public entities took the initiative to form the Cooperative and complete the Berkshire Wind Power Project.

Berkshire Wind Power Cooperative - Municipal Utility Members
| Municipal Department | Output kW | Percent Share of Output |
|---|---|---|
| Ashburnham Municipal Light Plant | 686 | 4.573 |
| Boylston Municipal Light Department | 663 | 4.419 |
| Groton Electric Light Department | 830 | 5.533 |
| Holden Municipal Light Department | 1,041 | 6.938 |
| Hull Municipal Lighting Plant | 765 | 5.102 |
| Ipswich Municipal Light Department | 962 | 6.416 |
| Marblehead Municipal Light Department | 1,009 | 6.727 |
| Paxton Municipal Light Department | 632 | 4.212 |
| Peabody Municipal Light Plant | 2,727 | 18.180 |
| Shrewsbury Electric & Cable Operations | 1,908 | 12.718 |
| Sterling Municipal Light Department | 785 | 5.232 |
| Templeton Municipal Light & Water Plant | 823 | 5.484 |
| Wakefield Municipal Gas & Light Department | 1,363 | 9.091 |
| West Boylston Municipal Lighting Plant | 806 | 5.374 |

== See also ==
- Wind power in Massachusetts
- Wind energy
- Wind turbines
