= New Ashford, Massachusetts =

- Town
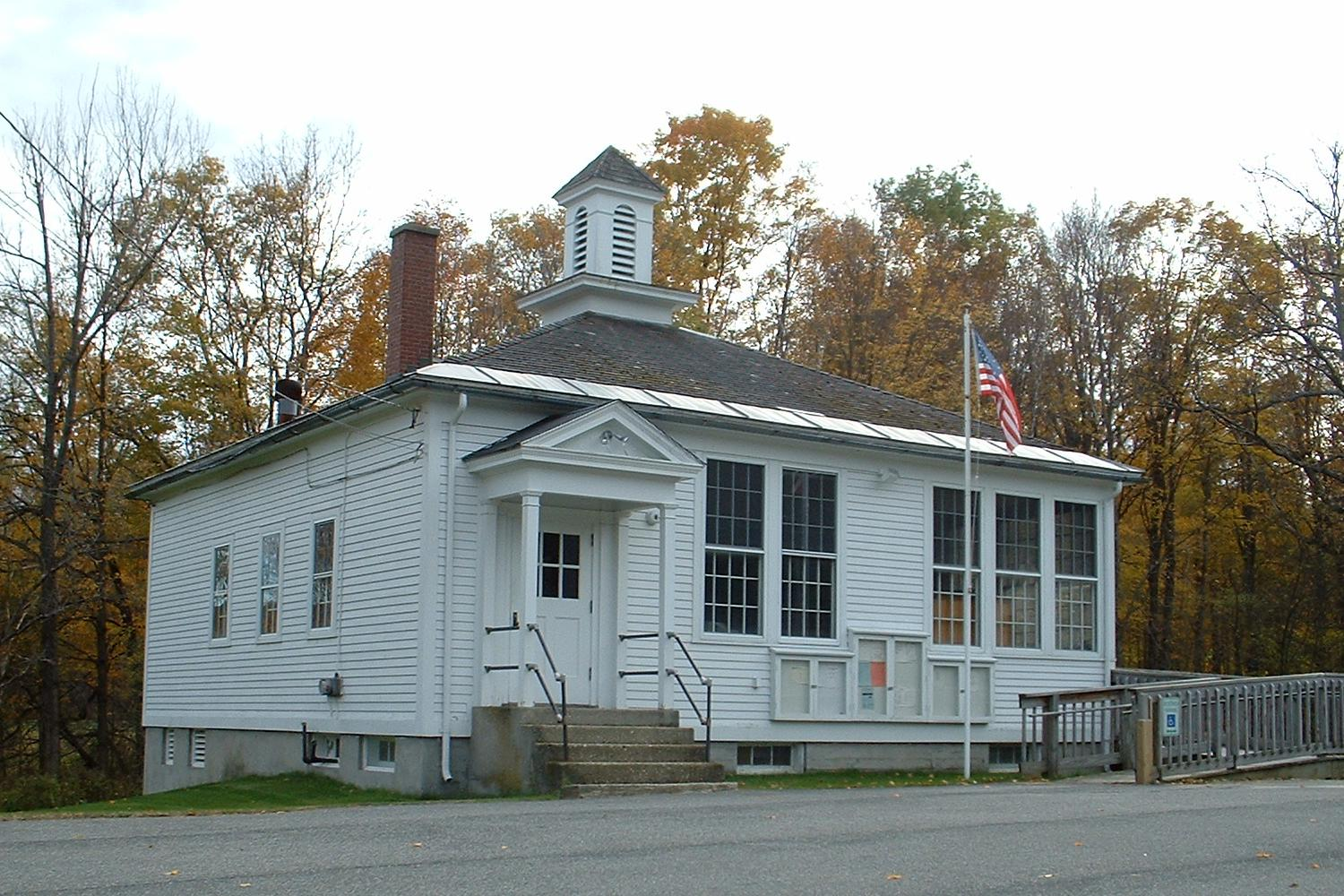
- New Ashford Town Hall

- Location in Berkshire County and the state of Massachusetts.
- Coordinates: 42°36′18″N 73°14′24″W
- Country: United States
- State: Massachusetts
- County: Berkshire
- Settled: 1762
- Incorporated: 1835

Government
  - Type: Open town meeting

Area
  - Total: 13.48 sq mi (34.91 km^{2})
  - Land: 13.46 sq mi (34.87 km^{2})
  - Water: 0.015 sq mi (0.04 km^{2})
- Elevation: 1,257 ft (383 m)

Population (2020)
  - Total: 250
  - Density: 19/sq mi (7.2/km^{2})
- Time zone: UTC-5 (Eastern)
  - Summer (DST): UTC-4 (Eastern)
- ZIP code: 01237
- Area code: 413
- FIPS code: 25-44385
- GNIS feature ID: 0598751
- Website: newashford-ma.us

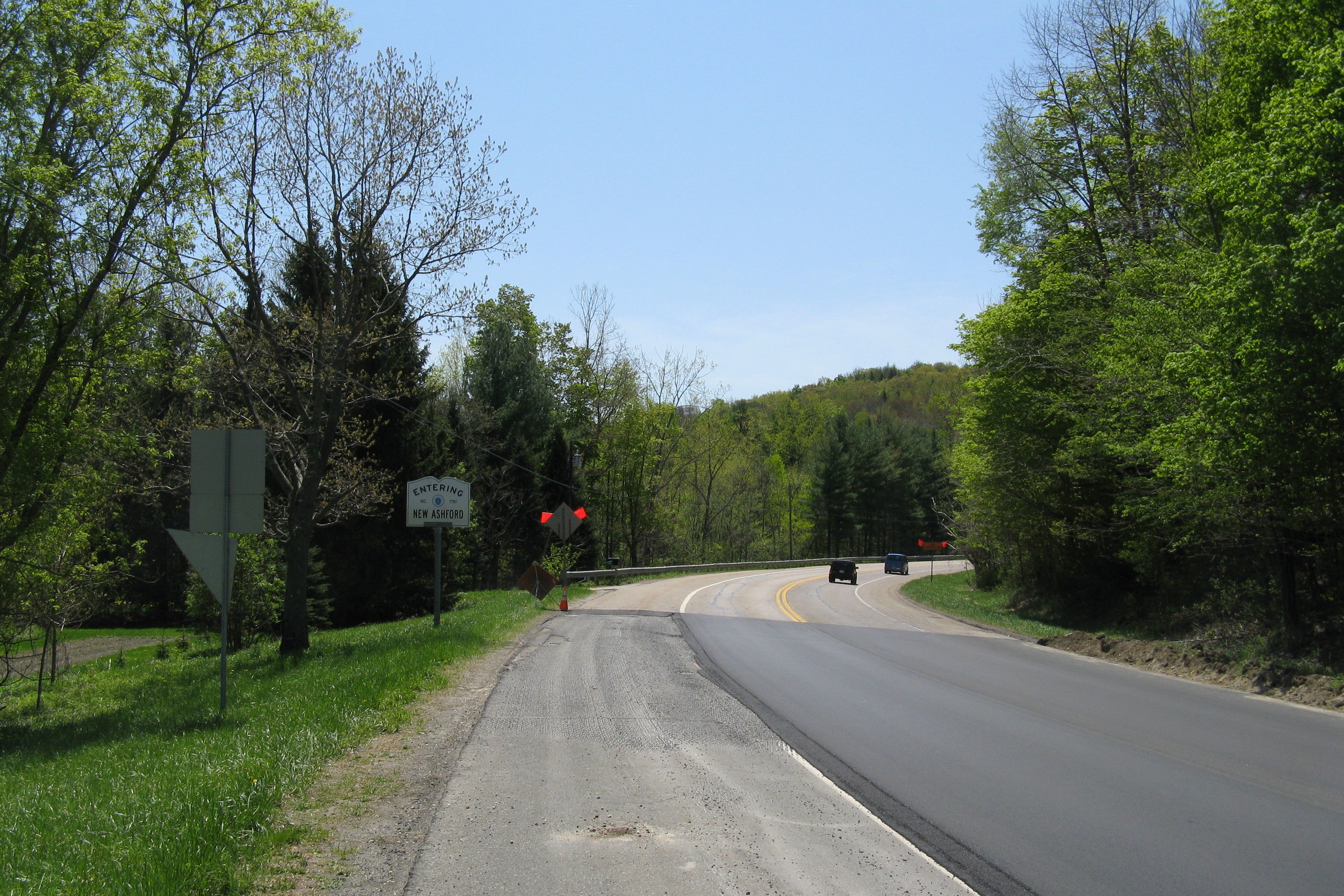
Entering New Ashford

New Ashford is a town in Berkshire County, Massachusetts, United States. It is part of the Pittsfield, Massachusetts Metropolitan Statistical Area. The population was 250 at the 2020 census.

== History ==
New Ashford was first settled in 1762 and was officially incorporated on November 4, 1835. It was named for Ashford, Connecticut, where the founding citizens came from. The town has mostly been a rural farming community, with few mills ever set up in the town. Beginning in 1916, and for a few years after that, New Ashford had the distinction of casting the first vote in United States Presidential Elections (as Dixville Notch, New Hampshire does today). Following the ratification of the Nineteenth Amendment the New Ashford poll was where Ms. Phoebe Jordan became the first woman to vote in a national election on November 2, 1920. The old wooden ballot box used on this historic occasion still sits in town hall, and is still in use today.

The town is home to the former Brodie Mountain ski area, a once popular ski resort, begun in 1939 on the Gregory Marakoff (Makaroff) farm.

== Geography ==
According to the United States Census Bureau, the town has a total area of 13.5 square miles (34.9 km^{2}), of which 0.015 square miles (0.04 km^{2}), or 0.10%, is water. It is the third-smallest town in Berkshire County by land area.

New Ashford is bordered by Williamstown to the north, Adams to the east, Cheshire to the southeast, Lanesborough to the south, and Hancock to the west. New Ashford is 11 miles (18 km) north of Pittsfield, 57 miles (92 km) northwest of Springfield, and 140 miles (230 km) west-northwest of Boston (although, like much of the Berkshires, it is closer to both Hartford and Albany than its own state capital).

New Ashford sits in a small natural valley within the Taconic Mountains (popularly grouped with the Berkshires). To the east, Mount Greylock State Reservation rises, with the mountain itself peaking just northeast of the town. The peak of Saddle Ball Mountain, a part of the range, lies within the eastern part of town and is the highest point in town, reaching 3,220 feet (980 m) above sea level. The Mount Greylock Scenic Drive crosses through the eastern part of town, on its way to the peak, as does the Appalachian Trail. To the west, Brodie Mountain runs along the western border of town, peaking in neighboring Hancock.

U.S. Route 7 passes through the center of town, and is the main road. No state routes pass through town. There is no rail service; the nearest rail (Amtrak and CSX) service is in Pittsfield. Bus and paratransit service is provided by Berkshire Regional Transit Authority. The town is located between two local airports, Harriman and West Airport in North Adams and Pittsfield Municipal Airport. The nearest airport with national service is Albany International Airport.

== Demographics ==
Historical population
Year	Pop.	±%
1790	460	—
1850	186	−59.6%
1860	239	+28.5%
1870	208	−13.0%
1880	203	−2.4%
1890	125	−38.4%
1900	107	−14.4%
1910	92	−14.0%
1920	116	+26.1%
1930	75	−35.3%
1940	87	+16.0%
1950	118	+35.6%
1960	165	+39.8%
1970	183	+10.9%
1980	159	−13.1%
1990	192	+20.8%
2000	247	+28.6%
2010	228	−7.7%
2020	250	+9.6%
2024*	249	−0.4%
* = population estimate. Source: United States census records and Population Estimates Program data.

As of the census of 2000, there were 247 people, 94 households, and 72 families residing in the town. New Ashford is the second least-populated town in Berkshire County, and fourth-smallest town in Massachusetts (ahead of Mount Washington, Monroe and Gosnold). The population density was 18.2 people per square mile (7.0/km^{2}), making it fourth-smallest in the county and ninth-smallest in the Commonwealth by population density. There were 110 housing units at an average density of 8.1 per square mile (3.1/km^{2}). The racial makeup of the town was 95.55% White, 0.81% African American, 3.24% Asian, and 0.40% from two or more races.

There were 94 households, out of which 36.2% had children under the age of 18 living with them, 66.0% were married couples living together, 9.6% had a female householder with no husband present, and 23.4% were non-families. 16.0% of all households were made up of individuals, and 7.4% had someone living alone who was 65 years of age or older. The average household size was 2.63 and the average family size was 3.00.

In the town, the population was spread out, with 28.8% under the age of 18, 4.9% from 18 to 24, 29.6% from 25 to 44, 31.2% from 45 to 64, and 9.3% who were 65 years of age or older. The median age was 38 years. For every 100 females, there were 100.8 males. For every 100 females age 18 and over, there were 90.7 males.

The median income for a household in the town was $51,250, and the median income for a family was $58,125. Males had a median income of $46,250 versus $41,250 for females. The per capita income for the town was $28,323. None of the families and 2.2% of the population were living below the poverty line.

== Government ==
The town uses the open town meeting form of government, and is led by a board of selectmen. The town has its own fire and public works services. Police services are provided by the Massachusetts State Police. The town has no public library.

On the state level, New Ashford is represented in the Massachusetts House of Representatives as part of the First Berkshire District, represented by Gailanne M. Cariddi since January 2013. In the Massachusetts Senate, the town is part of the Berkshire, Hampshire and Franklin district, represented by Adam Hinds, which includes all of Berkshire County and western Hampshire and Franklin counties. The town is patrolled by the Fourth (Cheshire) Station of Barracks "B" of the Massachusetts State Police.

On the national level, New Ashford is represented in the United States House of Representatives as part of Massachusetts's 1st congressional district, and has been represented by Richard Neal of Springfield since January 2013. Massachusetts is currently represented in the United States Senate by Elizabeth Warren and Ed Markey.

The town provided Libertarian Gary Johnson with his largest percentage of the vote statewide in the 2016 presidential election. Out of 160 total votes cast in the town, Johnson received 14 (8.75 percent, more than double of his statewide percentage of 4.15). Democrat Hillary Rodham Clinton won the town with 101 votes (63.13 percent) over Republican Donald Trump, who received 39 votes (24.38 percent). Green Party nominee Jill Stein received six votes (3.75 percent).

== Education ==
Students from pre-kindergarten through sixth grade attend Pontoosuc Regional Elementary School along with Lanesborough, and students from seventh through twelfth grades attend Mount Greylock Regional School in Williamstown. Private schools are located in Williamstown, and vocational and parochial schools are located in Pittsfield and North Adams.

The nearest community college is Berkshire Community College in Pittsfield. The nearest state college is Massachusetts College of Liberal Arts in North Adams, and the nearest state university is the University of Massachusetts Amherst. The nearest private college is Williams College in neighboring Williamstown.
