= Potter Mountain =

Ridgeline

Highest point
- Elevation: 2,430 ft (740 m)
- Parent peak: N 42.54726 W 73.27001
- Coordinates: 42°32′50″N 73°16′12″W

Geography
- Location: Berkshire County, Massachusetts
- Parent range: Taconic Mountains

Geology
- Rock age: Ordovician
- Mountain type(s): Thrust fault; metamorphic rock and sedimentary rock

Climbing
- Easiest route: Ski lift

Potter Mountain is a prominent ridgeline located in the Taconic Mountains of western Massachusetts. It has several peaks; the most notable are the southern Jiminy Peak, 2,392 feet (729 m), which bears the name of the ski area located on its slopes, and Widow White's Peak, 2,430 feet (740 m), the ridge high point.

The mountain is located in the towns of Hancock and Lanesborough. It was formerly traversed by the Taconic Skyline Trail which no longer officially crosses the ridge. Potter Mountain offers expansive viewpoints from several clearings, particularly where the ski area meets the ridge on the southwest side of the mountain. Potter Mountain is sometimes confused with the northern peak of Poppy Mountain to the south.

The Taconic Range ridgeline continues north from Potter Mountain as Brodie Mountain and south as Poppy Mountain. It is bordered to the west across the Wyomanock Creek valley by Rounds Mountain. The west side of the mountain drains into Kinderhook Creek, the Hudson River and New York Harbor. The east side drains into Secum Brook, thence Pontoosuc Lake, the Housatonic River, and Long Island Sound.
