= Sarah B. Capron =

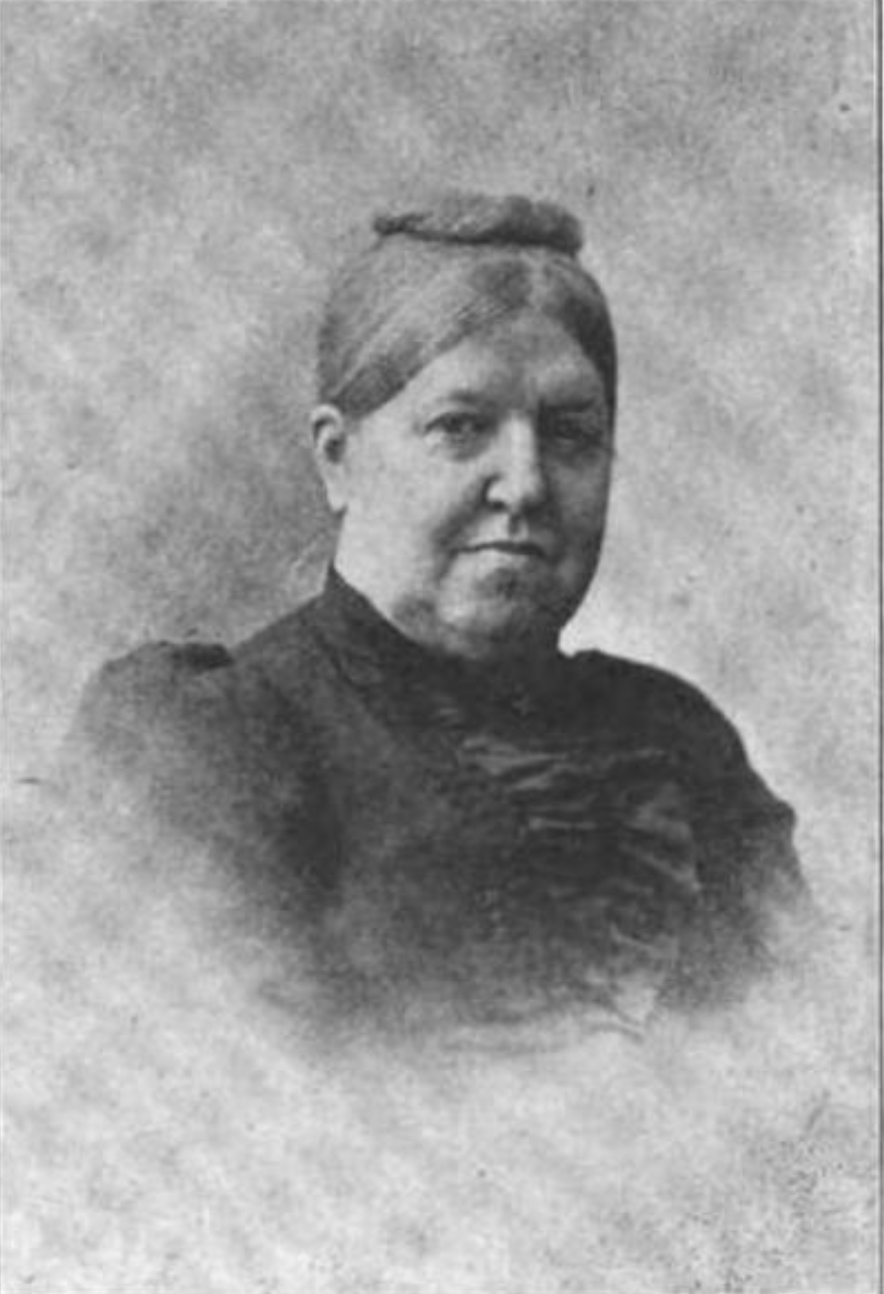
- Capron in a 1919 magazine
- Born: Sarah Brown Hooker; April 24, 1828; Lanesboro, Massachusetts, U.S.
- Died: December 15, 1918 (aged 90)
- Education: Wheaton Seminary; State Normal School (now Framingham State University)
- Occupations: missionary; educator
- Known for: Capron Hall School
- Spouse: Rev. William Banfield Capron (m. 1856; died 1876)
- Children: 3
- Relatives: Thomas Hooker

Sarah B. Capron (née Hooker; 1824–1918) was an American evangelical missionary. She served for 30 years as a missionary in India along three lines, by educational work, by medical work, and by training Bible women for evangelistic work. For three years, she conducted the boarding school in Madura, later Capron Hall School. Later, she opened a boarding school in Manamadura, and still later supervised day schools for Hindu girls, with an attendance of hundreds. In all of these, she pursued original methods to do her work. She qualified herself for simple medical practice, going among the homes and opening a dispensary, and had the satisfaction of seeing this develop into the Madura Hospital for Women and Children. For 24 years, she served on the Executive Committee of the Woman's Board, and for five years, She was in charge of the women's department in the Moody Bible Institute in Chicago.

== Early life and education ==
Sarah Brown Hooker was born in Lanesboro, Massachusetts, April 24, 1828. Her paternal grandfather was Thomas Hooker, of Rutland, Vermont, who was a lineal descendant of Thomas Hooker of the Connecticut Colony. Her grandmother, Mrs. Sarah Brown Hooker, was a daughter of Lieutenant Colonel John Brown, of Pittsfield, Massachusetts, who retired from the army because he distrusted Benedict Arnold, but who afterward died in service at Stone Arabia, in New York, in 1780. Her father was the Rev. Henry Brown Hooker, D.D., a minister of the Congregational church in Lanesboro, afterward in Falmouth, Massachusetts. He was a member of the Massachusetts Board of Education, receiving his appointment from Governor George N. Briggs . His last work was as the secretary of the Massachusetts Home Missionary Society. Her mother, whose maiden name was Martha Vinal Chickering, resided in Boston before marriage.

Capron's education was received in Wheaton Seminary, Norton, Massachusetts, and in the State Normal School (now Framingham State University) at West Newton, Massachusetts. In her vacations, she taught two summer terms and two winter terms in the district schools of Falmouth, on Cape Cod. The State Normal School was then under the direction of Eben S. Stearns, with Electa Nobles Lincoln Walton being the assistant. Nathaniel T. Allen, afterward identified with the West Newton English and Classical School, was the principal of the Normal School, while Lucretia Crocker was then a student at the Normal School. Capron graduated in November 1850.

== Career ==
Capron was elected first assistant in the Oliver High School, Lawrence, Massachusetts, T. W. T. Curtis being principal and George A. Walton master of the Grammar school in the same building. Capron afterward became an assistant in the Hartford High School, remaining until April 1854.

=== Missionary ===
On October 1, 1856, she married the Rev. William Banfield Capron, of Uxbridge, Massachusetts. They were appointed as missionaries of the American Board to Madura, South India, and sailed in an ice ship for Madras, November 21, the voyage taking 100 days. On arriving in Madura (now Madurai), Capron, was put in charge of the Madura Girls' Boarding School, later known in the Madras Presidency as the Madura Girls' Training and High School. Rev. Capron, during this time, was building a house in Manamadurai, 30 miles (48 km) distant, to which they removed in 1864, the women in charge of the Girls' School having returned from her furlough in the U.S. Capron's previous service was the prelude to the various forms of educational work of which she had charge until 1886, with the exception of one furlough of two years, from 1872 to 1874.

The work of a foreign missionary naturally resolved itself into two lines. There was the development of the Christian community, which should be self-propagating and self-sustaining, and to this end, all the training was directed. There was also the endeavor to uplift everyone within the sphere of influence. The first step in the former lay in the day schools in the villages, planned to give instruction to the children of Christians; but these in all cases included many more who were drawn by the attractiveness of a school so differently conducted from the other local options. With consideration that each station in charge of a resident missionary comprised from 30 to 100 villages, in which were these schools, it was evident that the missionary became a superintendent of schools. It was considered a gala day when the missionary women came to inspect the school. On such occasions, there was the selection of a bright child, whether from a Christian family or not, to come to the next stage in this educational scheme.

Station boarding schools were at the station of the resident missionary, and his wife was in charge. Here, the best pupils came from all the villages, numbering sometimes even a 100. Selections from these passed on to the girls' high and training-school at the central station, and also to the high school and normal school, or college for the boys. The theological school completed the process.

Not included in the above, there were also Hindu girls' day schools and the Anglo-vernacular day schools for boys, both of which received pupils who were shut out from the boarding-schools on account of caste.

After Rev. Capron's death in October 1876, the widow removed to the city of Madura to superintend the work for women and girls. Here she remained for ten years, or until her return to the U.S. There were three day schools for Hindu girls, and another was soon added. These four schools provided for nearly 400 girls of the higher castes. The government of India provided generously for the education of girls, as the Results Grants yearly examinations brought funds to be added to the allowance from the U.S. Three masters and twelve school-mistresses were in charge. In place of a rented room, a new building was provided for one of these schools in the midst of Brahmin homes.

While having the oversight of these schools, Capron felt the claim of the women upon educational effort imperative. No such provision as the Hindu girls' day schools having been made for the mothers in their girlhood days, they wished that they too might learn to read. Hence there arose a demand for teachers in the homes. For a woman to be seen going about the streets and entering houses of those not her relations was not consonant with Hindu ideals. There being in those earlier days no suitable women as teachers except those trained in mission schools, these were constrained by the example of the woman missionary to put aside custom and give their services to those who were ready to receive, and, having taught the primer, they next gave them Bible study. Since in many homes, they read from the Bible to those who were glad to listen, they were called Bible women. There were three of these teachers, or readers, and 30 women under instruction. Their number increased to 12, the number learning to read to 950. The superintendence of these added to her own visits in the homes was a work full of interest to Capron.

A room in the dispensary was given to Capron, where women and children coming for medical treatment could gather. Coming to India before the days of medical education for women, but having a liking for the work, under the leadership of Dr. Edward Chester, Capron gave two hours each morning to writing such prescriptions as were within her ability. Desiring to gain some education in healthcare, Capron spent six weeks in 1875 in the Government Hospital in Madras, where the physician in charge provided some training.

During the Great Famine of 1876–1878, when 5,000,000 of the people in the Madras Presidency and the Deccan Plateau died, Capron received for a year and a half a monthly grant from the Mansion House fund, London, for famine relief. Generous contributions also came from the U.S.

In 1886, at the railway station in Madura, when she had retired and was leaving the country, a Brahmin gentleman, followed by a servant bearing a large brass tray, made his way through the crowd, and, coming to the window of the car where Capron was sitting, asked her to come to the platform. Placing an enormous wreath of buds of the white jasamine with touches of pink oleander upon her shoulders, he said, "I bring to you this as a token of the regard of our families for what you have done for the women of our city."

=== Return to the U.S. ===
Arriving in the U.S., Capron served on the Women's Board of Missions and made speeches about her missionary experience in India. She also wrote articles for publication and Bible study.

In 1889, Dwight L. Moody, about to open in Chicago the Moody Bible Institute, a training school for home and foreign missions, asked Capron to become superintendent of the women's department. When she questioned her fitness for the position, he replied, "It is the experience of life that I want". Young men and women who were desiring to enter church and city work were trained to know how sympathetically and tactfully to find their way into the lives of those who lived in poverty. Candidates for foreign missionary work and women at home on furlough from foreign fields were among the students. Capron resigned her position in 1894.

In 1895, Capron was made a member of the Executive Committee of the Woman's Board, also served as chair of the Candidate Committee.

After retirement, Capron moved to Boston to be with her sister, Mrs. Arthur W. Tufts, For many years, Capron conducted a Bible class of women at Boston's Old South Church, interpreting Oriental imagery by her Eastern life, shedding new light on familiar passages by her original thought, and giving inspiration from the depth of her own spiritual life.

== Personal life ==
Rev. Capron was a graduate of Yale College and of Andover Theological Seminary, and for a number of years, principal of the Hopkins Grammar School at Hartford, Connecticut, before its union with the high school. He originated and established the Madura Widows' Aid Society.

Capron had three children including Annie Hooker Capron (Mrs. Lewis Kennedy Morse and Laura Elisabeth Capron (Mrs. James Dyer Keith). Later in life, Capron moved in with her daughter Laura.

== Death and legacy ==
The cornerstone for the Capron Hall School, in Madurai, named in her honour, was laid in 1902.

A year before her death, J. P. Jones published Capron's biography.

Sarah B. Capron died on December 15, 1918.

The Sarah Brown Hooker Capron papers are held at the University of Pennsylvania.
