= Patsy Rogers =

Patsy Rogers (born 19 January 1938) is an American composer and teacher who has won several awards and commissions. She is active in the International Alliance for Women in Music (IAWM).

Rogers was born in New York City. She earned a B.A. (1960) and M.A. (1962) from Bennington College. She also studied at Columbia University and Smith College. Her teachers included Henry Brant, Louis Calabro, Vivian Fine, Iva Dee Hiatt, and Lionel Nowak.

Rogers has taught composition, guitar, piano, and recorder at the Antioch Graduate School (Keene, New Hampshire), Brattleboro School of Music, Brooklyn College, Keene State College, New Lincoln School, Mannes School of Music, United Nations International School (New York), and the University of Massachusetts (Amherst). She conducts the Recorder Orchestra of New York.

Rogers has won several awards and commissions:

- 1979 composer in residence at the Chamber Music Conference and Composers’ Forum of the East
- 1982 performance award at the First National Congress on Women in Music
- 1982 commissioned by the Anna Crusis Women’s Choir to compose For Betty Crocker
- 1983 winner, Gladys Turk Song Search
- 1983 commissioned by Wendy G. Hill to composer Sonja

In addition to composing, Rogers has arranged works by Gabriel Faure, Joseph Haydn, and Arnold Schoenberg. Her own compositions have been commercially recorded by Lucille Fields on the Cambria label. She has supported the Rites of Spring Musical Festival on Long Island, as well as the Miriam Gideon Prize, which she offered through the IAWM for works by a female composer over 50 for solo voice with one to five instruments.

In his book Recent American Art Song, Keith E. Clifton noted that “composer Judith Lang Zaimont describes Rogers’ style as ‘purposefully accessible to the average listener,’ and Rogers has referred to her own free use of the tonal system as ‘floating tonalities.’”

Roger’s compositions are published by Casio Publishing Company and Hildegarde Publishing Company. They include:

== Ballet ==
- Crayons (chamber ensemble)
- How the Elephant Got Its Trunk (chamber ensemble)

== Chamber ==
- Five Duos (clarinet and cello)
- Fortune Cookies (violin, viola and cello)
- Suite of Short Pieces (alto recorder)
- Threads: A Study in Percussion Sonorities for Two Players
- Trio (flute, viola and bassoon)
- Wind Octet

== Opera ==
- Woman Alive: Conversation Against Death (text by Eve Merriam)

== Orchestra ==
- Bridges
- Concerto for Viola
- Concerto for Tenor Violin
- Fanfare (chamber orchestra)
- For Betty Crocker (text by Ellen Mason; chamber orchestra and women’s chorus)
- Ostinatia (chamber orchestra and harpsichord)

== Organ ==
- Christmas Overture: Festival of Carols (brass, organ and percussion)
- Wedding March: Processional, Recessional (organ and percussion)

== Theatre ==
- A Husband’s Notes About Her (text by Eve Merriam)
- The Tempest (text by William Shakespeare)

== Vocal ==
- Anthem for Children’s Choir (with organ)
- Chinese Songs (soprano, viola and cello)
- Five Songs from Sonja
- Six French Songs (soprano and piano)
- Seven Macabre Songs (soprano, tenor and piano)
- Womansongs (a collection of songs for women’s voices based on poetry by women)
