= Rounds Mountain =

Mountain in New York, United States

Highest point
- Elevation: 2,257 ft (688 m)
- Coordinates: 42°34′09″N 73°20′13″W

Geography
- Location: Berkshire County, Massachusetts and Rensselaer County, New York
- Parent range: Taconic Mountains

Geology
- Rock age: Ordovician
- Mountain type(s): Thrust fault; metamorphic rock and sedimentary rock

Climbing
- Easiest route: Taconic Crest Trail

Rounds Mountain, 2,257 feet (688 m), is a prominent peak in the Taconic Mountains of western Massachusetts and adjacent New York. The west side of the mountain and summit are in New York; the east side is in Massachusetts. The summit is a bald; the slopes are wooded with northern hardwood tree species. It is notable for its views of the Hudson River Valley to the west and the Green River and Kinderhook Creek valleys of Hancock, Massachusetts to the east. The 35 mi (56 km) Taconic Crest Trail traverses the mountain. Much of the upper slopes and summit are protected conservation land.

== Geography ==
Rounds Mountain is partly in Stephentown, New York and partly in Hancock, Massachusetts. It is flanked to the south across the Kinderhook Creek valley by Poppy Mountain and to the southeast by Potter Mountain. The Taconic Ridge continues north from Rounds Mountain as Misery Mountain. The west side of Rounds Mountain drains into East Brook, then Kinderhook Creek, thence into the Hudson River and Long Island Sound. The east side drains into Kinderhook Creek.
