= Brodie Mountain =

Mountain in United States of America

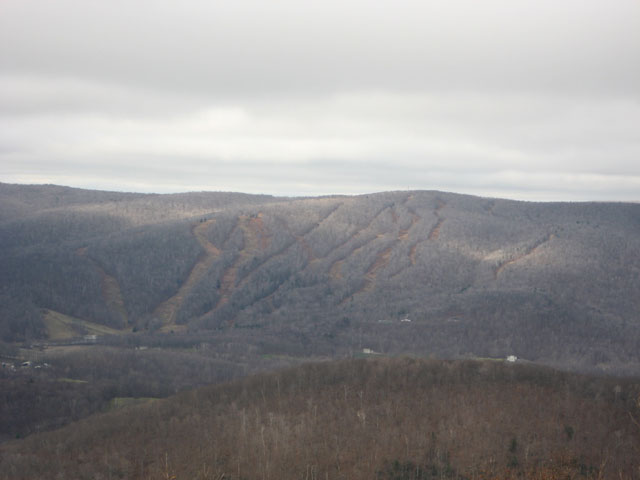
- Ski slopes on Brodie Mountain

Highest point
- Elevation: 2,621 ft (799 m)
- Coordinates: High point: 42°34′57″N 73°16′28″W; Ridgeline: 42°34′35″N 73°16′35″W to 42°38′00″N 73°14′10″W

Geography
- Location: Berkshire County, Massachusetts
- Parent range: Taconic Mountains

Geology
- Rock age: Ordovician
- Mountain type(s): Thrust fault; metamorphic rock and sedimentary rock

Climbing
- Easiest route: former Taconic Skyline Trail

Brodie Mountain, 2,621 feet (799 m), is a prominent 5.5-mile (8.9 km) long ridgeline in the Taconic Mountains of western Massachusetts, known for the former Brodie Mountain ski area, which closed in 2002. The ridge has eight well defined summits, three of which have names: Sheep's Heaven Mountain, 2,530 feet (770 m), the ridge's southern prominatory; Beoadic Mountain, the ridge high point, just north of Sheep's Heaven; and East Mountain, 2,613 feet (796 m) located at the top of the former ski area at the center of the ridge. A northern summit, 2,170 feet (660 m), is shown as "Brodie Mountain" on maps that predate the Brodie Mountain ski area.

== Geography ==
The Taconic Skyline Trail formerly ran north over Sheep's Heaven Mountain to the Brodie Mountain ski area at the East Mountain summit, but has been discontinued on Brodie Mountain, although the former route, now an unsanctioned ATV trail, still exists. An older route once traversed the entire ridge from south to north, but the northern sections fell into disuse in the 1970s and are totally obscured. The former ski area, located on the east-center portion of the ridge, was purchased for 2.6 million dollars in 2004 by a developer; much of it is slated for condominium development.

The Brodie Mountain ridge is located in the towns of Hancock, Lanesborough, New Ashford, and Williamstown, Massachusetts. It is bordered to the northeast by Mount Greylock, to the south by Potter Mountain; and to the west by Misery Mountain. The southwest side drains into Kinderhook Creek, thence the Hudson River and Long Island Sound; the northwest side into the West Branch of the Green River, the Green River, the Hoosic River, thence the Hudson River; the northeast side into East Brook, thence Green River; and the southeast side into Town Brook, the West Branch of the Housatonic River, thence the Housatonic River and Long Island Sound. The mountain is forested in northern hardwood species; its geology is Ordovician phyllite.

== Wind Farm ==
The Berkshire Wind Power Project, the largest operating wind farm in Massachusetts, began operation on the southern portion of the Brodie Mountain ridge in 2011. The facility consists of ten turbines capable of producing a total of fifteen megawatts of electricity, and is owned by the Berkshire Wind Power Cooperative Corporation, a non-profit, public power corporation.

== See also ==
- Brodie Mountain (ski area)
- Berkshire Wind Power Project
