= Tina Davidson =

American composer

Tina Davidson (born 30 December 1952) is an American composer.

== Background ==
Davidson was born in Stockholm, Sweden in 1952, and was raised in Oneonta, New York and Pittsburgh, Pennsylvania. She received her BA in piano and composition from Bennington College in 1976 where she studied with Henry Brant, Louis Calabro, Vivian Fine and Lionel Nowak. She founded the Philadelphia Chapter of the American Composers Forum and served as its director from 1999–2001. She was president of the New Music Alliance, a national organization, which has been responsible for the New Music America Festivals. She organized a nationwide festival entitled "New Music Across America," which ran in 18 cities in the U.S., Canada, and Europe. In 1992 she wrote a widely circulated article on women in music for Ms Magazine. She was a South Central PaARTners' Arts in Education Fellow.

She lives in Lancaster, Pennsylvania.

== Career ==
Over her forty-year career, Davidson has been commissioned by well-known ensembles such as National Symphony Orchestra, OperaDelaware, Roanoke Symphony, Orchestra Society of Philadelphia, VocalEssence, Kronos Quartet, Mendelssohn String Quartet, Cassatt Quartet, and public television (WHYY-TV). Her music has been widely performed by many orchestras and ensembles, including The Philadelphia Orchestra, American Composers Orchestra, St. Paul Chamber Orchestra, Musicopia String Orchestra, and Orchestra 2001. She was commissioned in 2011 by violinist, Hilary Hahn, who recorded her work on Deutsche Grammophon. The compact disc won a GRAMMY in 2015.

She has been acclaimed for her authentic voice, her “vivid ear for harmony and colors” (New York Times) and her works of “transfigured beauty” (OperaNews). She writes “real music, with structure, mood, novelty and harmonic sophistication – with haunting melodies that grow out of complex, repetitive rhythms” (Philadelphia Inquirer) that is both “intellectually rigorous and deeply moving” (Star-Tribune).

Long-term residencies play a major role in Davidson's career. As composer-in-residence with the Fleisher Art Memorial (1998–2001), she was commissioned to write for the Cassatt Quartet, Voces Novae et Antiquae, and members of the Philadelphia Orchestra. She also created the citywide Young Composers program to teach inner city children how to write music through instrument building, improvisation, and graphic notation. She was composer-in-residence as part of the innovative Meet the Composer "New Residencies" with OperaDelaware, the Newark Symphony and the YWCA in Delaware (1994–97). During this residency, she wrote the critically acclaimed full-length opera, Billy and Zelda, as well as created community partner programs for homeless women, and with students at a local elementary school.

The recipient of numerous prestigious grants and fellowships, Davidson was the first classical composer to receive a $50,000 Pew Fellowship, the largest such grant in the country for which an artist can apply. She has been awarded four Artist's Fellowships from the Pennsylvania Council on the Arts, CAP grants from the American Music Center and numerous Meet the Composer grants. Her work, Transparent Victims was selected by the American Public Radio as part of the International Rostrum of Composers, held at the UNESCO headquarters in Paris.

Ms Davidson's music can be heard on Albany Records, CRI, Mikrokosmik, Callisto, Innova and Opus One recording labels. Her first solo compact disc, "I Hear the Mermaids Singing," was released on CRI's Emergency Music label. Her second solo disc "It is My Heart Singing," was released on Albany Records (2006) and includes three works for string quartet performed by the Cassatt Quartet. The Cassatt Quartet also recorded her string quartet, Cassandra Sings for CRI. In June 2002, WHYY-TV released her piano trio, Bodies in Motion on CD and DVD formats as a part of their documentary, “Thomas Eakins: Scenes from Modern Life.” Her work, Antiphon for the Virgin, performed by VocalEssence Ensemble Singers, was released by St. Patrick Guild on compact disc in October 2002.

== Discography ==
- Tina Davidson: I Hear the Mermaids Singing
- Tina Davidson: It Is My Heart Singing
