= Brodie (ski area) =

Defunct ski area in New Ashford, Massachusetts, United States

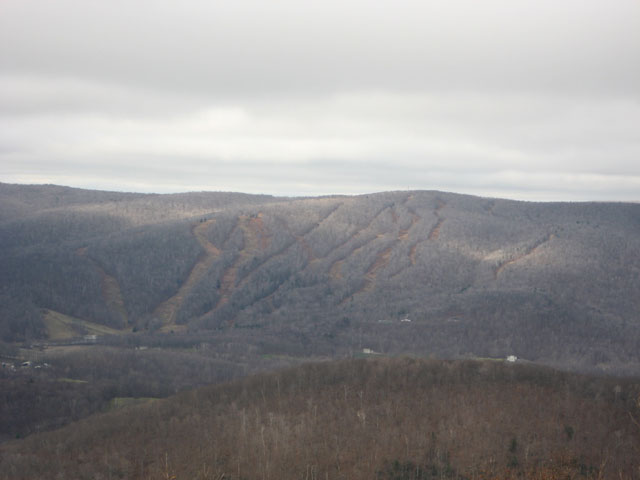
- Brodie Mountain as seen from Rounds Rock
- Interactive map of Brodie
- Location: New Ashford, Massachusetts, US
- Nearest city: Pittsfield
- Coordinates: 42°35′41.58″N 73°15′39.38″W
- Vertical: 1,250 ft (380 m)
- Trails: 40
- Longest run: 2 m (6 ft 7 in)
- Lift system: 4 chairs: 4 Doubles

Brodie was a ski resort in New Ashford, Massachusetts, in the Taconic Mountains in the far northwestern part of the state. It opened in 1964 and thrived for a time by using then-cutting-edge innovations like top-to-bottom snowmaking and lighted night skiing. Founder Jim Kelly gave the resort an Irish theme: its nickname was "Kelly's Irish Alps"; the slopes had names like "Shamrock," "Killarney," and "JFK"; and the base lodge housed an Irish-themed bar that did a rousing business in drinks and live music. But like many small independent ski areas, Brodie lost business over time to larger, higher-capitalized, corporate-owned resorts.

In 1999 the Kellys sold it to the owners of nearby Jiminy Peak, who closed Brodie in 2002 and sold it to a Texas-based condominium developer. The area continued to operate snow tubing, in conjunction with Jiminy Peak, through the 2006–07 season.

With a vertical drop of 1,250 feet and four chairlifts, Brodie is the largest closed ski area in the Berkshires.

== Wind power ==
Part of the mountain is now the site of a Wind power project: the Berkshire Wind Power Project is owned by the Berkshire Wind Power Cooperative Corporation, a non-profit, public power corporation. On November 19, 2010, the last component of the new 10-turbine wind farm was lifted into place, and after the turbines were commissioned and connected to the grid, it began commercial operation on May 28, 2011. The project generates 15MW of power. Members of the cooperative include Massachusetts Municipal Wholesale Electric Company and the 14 municipal utilities serving these Massachusetts communities:

- Ashburnham
- Boylston
- Groton
- Holden
- Hull
- Ipswich
- Marblehead
- Paxton
- Peabody
- Shrewsbury
- Sterling
- Templeton
- Wakefield
- West Boylston
