= Marta Ptaszynska =

Polish composer

Marta Ptaszyńska
- Born: July 29, 1943 (age 83); Warsaw, Poland
- Occupations: Composer, percussionist, music professor
- Employer: University of Chicago
- Known for: Contemporary classical music; percussion performance; orchestral, chamber, and vocal compositions
- Awards: Officer's Cross of Merit of the Republic of Poland (1995); Guggenheim Fellowship; Ditson Conductor's Award; Fromm Music Foundation Award; ASCAP Awards

Marta Ptaszyńska (born 29 July 1943) is a Polish composer, percussionist and professor of music at the University of Chicago. She has been described by the Polish Music Center of the University of Southern California as "one of the best known Polish woman composers" as well as "a virtuoso percussionist specializing in performances of contemporary music".

== Career ==
Ptaszyńska was born in Warsaw, Poland. In 1998, she was appointed a Professor of Music and the Humanities at the University of Chicago. Since 2005 she holds an endowed chair of Helen B. & Frank L. Sulzberger Professor in Composition.

She has been honored with many prizes and awards including Simon J. Guggenheim Foundation Fellowship, the Danks Award of the American Academy of Arts and Letters, the Fromm Music Foundation Award, the Award at the International Rostrum of Composers at the UNESCO in Paris, several ASCAP Awards, and many more. In 1995, she received the Officer Cross of Merit of the Republic of Poland.

== Works ==
=== Orchestral music ===
Title	Date Composed	Date Premiered	Premiering Orchestra	Conductor	Notes
Improvisations	(1968)	March 26, 1971	The Cracow Philharmonic Orchestra	Renard Czajkowski	
Spectri Sonori	(1973)	January 22, 1974	The Cleveland Orchestra	Matthias Bamert	
Crystallites	(1973–74)	January 24, 1975	The Pomeranian Philharmonic Orchestra, Bydgoszcz, Poland	Antoni Wit	Commissioned by the Kościuszko Foundation in New York
Concerto for Percussion Quartet and Orchestra	(1974)	October 10, 1974	Sage City Symphony Orchestra, Bennington, Vermont	Louis Calabro	Commissioned by the Sage City Symphony Orchestra
Conductus – A Ceremonial for Winds	(1982)	March 18, 1983	The Chicago Symphonic Band, Chicago		for symphonic band
La Novella D'Inverno (Winter's Tale)	(1984)	May 5, 1985	The Polish Chamber Orchestra, Lisbon, Portugal	Jerzy Maksymiuk	for strings. Commissioned by and dedicated to Jerzy Maksymiuk and the Polish Chamber Orchestra, Second Prize at the International Rostrum of Composers in Paris, France, 1986
Concerto for Marimba and Orchestra	(1985)	May 8, 1986	The Cracow Radio and TV Symphony Orchestra, Cracow	Szymon Kawalla	Dedicated to Keiko Abe. Recordings: CD, Muza Records, Poland, 1991
Charlie's Dream	(1988)				Concerto for Saxophone and Orchestra
Ode to Praise All Famous Women	(1992)	March 22, 1992	Orlando, Florida Space Coast Philharmonic Orchestra	Maria Tunicka	Commissioned by the Florida Space Coast Philharmonic
Fanfare For Peace	(1993)	November 18, 1994	Cincinnati, Cincinnati Symphony Orchestra	Jesús López-Cobos	Commissioned by Jesús López-Cobos and the Cincinnati Symphony Orchestra
Concerto Grosso	(1996)	January 26, 1997	Warsaw, Sinfonia Varsovia	Lord Yehudi Menuhin	for two violins and chamber orchestra
Fanfare in Memoriam Frédéric Chopin	(1999)	June 12, 1999	Chicago, Polish American Symphony Orchestra	Wojciech Niewzol	
Drum of Orfeo – Concerto for Percussion	(1999–2001)				Written for and dedicated to Evelyn Glennie

=== Vocal and instrumental works ===
Title	Date Composed	Instrumentation	Premiere	Notes
A Tale of Nightingales	(1968)	for baritone and chamber ensemble		To the poetry of K.I. Gałczyński
Vocalise	(1971)	for female voice and vibraphone	July 18, 1971, Breukelen, the Netherlands	Cornelia van der Horst, soprano; Marta Ptaszyńska, vibes
Oscar of Alva opera in 6 scenes	(1971–72, revised in 1986)	for 5 soloists (soprano, mezzo-soprano, tenor, baritone, bass), mixed choir and orchestra	A TV production: 1988, Cracow, Poland, Polish Radio and Television (in Polish with English subtitles). Stanisław Zajączkowski, director, Cracow Radio and TV Orchestra and Chorus, Szymon Kawalla, conductor	Libretto based on Lord Byron's poem by Z. Kopalko
Epigrams	(1976–77)	for women's choir, flute, harp, piano and percussion	May 8, 1977, Santa Barbara, California, Dorians Choir, Michael Ingham, conductor	To ancient Greek poetry; in English. Commissioned by the Dorians Choir of the University of California at Santa Barbara
Un Grand Sommeil Noir (A Great Dark Sleep)	(1977)	for soprano, flute and harp	June 22, 1979, Pontino, Italy, XV Festival di Musica Contemporanea	To Paul Verlaine's poem (French/English)
Die Sonette an Orpheus (Sonnets to Orpheus)	(1980–81)	for middle voice and chamber orchestra	October, 1989, Warsaw, Poland, Sinfonia Varsovia, Jerzy Maksymiuk, conductor, Ewa Podleś, mezzo-soprano	To Rainer Maria Rilke's poems; in German.
Ave Maria	(1982 version)	for four men's voices, brass, percussion and organ	October 10, 1982, Boston Cathedral, New England Conservatory New Music Ensemble	Commissioned by the S. Moniuszko Musical Society of Boston
Ave Maria	(1987 version)	for men's choir and orchestra	April 18, 1988, Cracow, Poland, The Polish Radio Symphony Orchestra and Choir	
Polish Letters (Listy Polskie)	(1988)	for percussion, piano, string quartet, soprano, mezzo-soprano, baritone soli	July 15, 1989, Royal Castle in Warsaw, Poland, Warsaw Academy of Music chamber Choir and Instrumental Ensemble, Varsovia String Quartet, Ryszard Zimak, conductor, VHS recording: Polish TV Poltel, Warsaw, 1984	Cantata to commemorate Poland's Independence. To the poetry of Polish and other European poets; in Polish
Songs of Despair and Loneliness (Pieśni rozpaczy i samotności)	(1988–89)	for mezzo-soprano and piano	October 3, 1989, Warsaw Philharmonic, Poland, E. Podleś and J. Marchwiński. Recordings: CD, Muza Records, Poland, 1991	Poems by Rilke, Verlaine, Shakespeare, Staff, and Lorca in original languages. Commissioned by Jerzy Marchwiński for Ewa Podleś, contralto
Holocaust Memorial Cantata	(1992)	for three solo voices, mixed choir and orchestra (percussion, harp, strings)	April 5, 1992, Glencoe, Illinois; Lira Singers; Lucy J. Ding conductor. Score and piano reduction. Recordings: CD, POLYGRAM CD ACCORD, Poland, 1996	To the poetry of Leslie Woolf Hedley "Chant for All the People on Earth" (English/Hebrew/Yiddish/Polish). Commissioned by the Lira Singers of Chicago
Liquid Light for Mezzosoprano	(1994–1995)	Piano and Percussion	Warsaw Autumn Festival 1997 and in the unabridged version at the Huddersfield Contemporary Music Festival, November 25, 1997. Patricia Adkins Chiti, mezzo-soprano; Ian Buckle, piano; Marta Ptaszynska, percussion	To the poetry of Modene Duffy. Commissioned by and written for Patricia Adkins Chiti
Cantiones Jubilationis	(1995)	for women's choir and Percussion	March 19, 1995, Chicago; The Lira Singers; Lucy Ding, conductor	To the poetry of Modene Duffy. Commissioned by the Lira Singers of Chicago
Silver Echos of Distant Bells	(1995)	for mezzo-soprano and string quartet	December 10, 1995 in New York at the Kościuszko Foundation by Mary Henderson-Stuckey (mezzo-soprano) and the Halycon String Quartet	To the poetry of Lord Tennyson, Laslie Woolf Hedley, Donald Bogan, Krzysztof Koehler and Stanisław Wyspiański; in English. Commissioned by the Kosciuszko Foundation

=== Chamber music ===
Title	Date Composed	Instrumentation	Notes
Four Preludes	(1965)	for vibraphone and piano	
Scherzo	(1967)	for xylophone and piano	
Jeu-Parti	(1970)	for harp and vibraphone	
Madrigals "Canticum Sonarum" Igor Stravinsky in Memoriam	(1971)	for woodwind and string quartets, trumpet, trombone and gong	First performance: March, 1972, Warsaw, Poland, Warsaw Philharmonic Chamber Players. Special Mention, Young Polish Composers Contest, 1971
Cadenza	(1972)	for flute and percussion	
Siderals	(1974)	for two percussion quintets and light projection	Commissioned and premiered by the University of Illinois Percussion Ensemble, Thomas Siwe, conductor. 1974 Percussive Arts Society Award
Mobile	(1976)	for two percussionists	First performance: November 10, 1976, Bennington College, Vermont, Louis Calabro, Marta Ptaszyńska
Classical Variations	(1976)	for timpani and string quartet	1976 Award at the Percussive Arts Society Composition Contest
Synchrony	(1978)	for percussion trio	
Dream Lands, Magic Spaces	(1979)	for violin, piano and 6 percussion players	First performance: November 13, 1980, San Francisco Conservatory Percussion Ensemble, Daniel Kobialka, violin, Barry Jekowski, conductor. Percussive Arts Society International Conference, San Jose, California
Scintilla	(1984)	for two marimbas	First performance: 1985 by the duo Tavernier in France
Moon Flowers (Kwiaty Księżyca)	(1986)	for cello and piano	Commissioned by the BBC in Bristol for the duo R. Jabłoński, cello, and K. Borucińska, piano. First broadcast performance: May 14, 1986, BBC, England. First live performance: September 27, 1986, Warsaw, Poland, 29th International Music Festival Warsaw Autumn. Recordings: Proviva – Teldec Germany, ISPN 152
Ajikan – Unfolding Light	(1989)	for flute and percussion	Commissioned by and dedicated to the Uroboros Ensemble in England. First performance: September 10, 1989, Southampton International Music Week
Poetic Impressions	(1991)	for wind quintet and piano	Commissioned by the Warsaw Wind Quintet. Recordings: CD, DUX Records, Poland (CD of the Year 1996)
Concerto for saxophone and chamber orchestra	(1988–90)	for solo alto and tenor saxophone	Written for David Pituch and Sinfonia Varsovia First performance: June 26, 1997, Festival European Cultural Month in Ljubljana, Slovenia
Four Portraits	(1994)	for string quartet	Written for the Wilanów String Quartet. Premiered: April 22, 1994 at Bruno Walter Auditorium at Lincoln Center in New York.
Concerto Grosso	(1996)	for 2 violins and chamber orchestra	Written as "A Birthday present for Lord Yehudi Menuhin" First performance: January 26, 1997, Warsaw, Poland, Sinfonia Varsovia and Lord Menuhin. VHS recording By Polish Television, Warsaw, 1997
Letter To The Sun	(1998–2000)	for frame drum, percussion quartet and narrator	To the poem by Julia Rafalska; in English. Written for Morris Lang and the Brooklyn College Percussion Ensemble. First performance: November 8, 2000, New York, USA, Brooklyn College Percussion Ensemble, Brian Willson, conductor
Scherzo Di Fantasia	(1997)	for euphonium and piano	Commissioned by the National Brass Society for the International Brass Conference in St. Louis. First performance: June 29, 1997, St. Louis, USA, Gail Robertson, euphonium
Mancala	(1997)	for 2 violins	Written for Hanna Lachert, violinist of the New York Philharmonic. First performance: April 18, 1997, New York, USA

=== Instrumental and solo works ===
Title	Date Composed	Notes
Variations for flute	(1967)	
Space Model for percussion	(1971–75)	
Stress for percussion & tape	(1972)	
Arabesque for harp	(1972)	
Touracou for harpsichord	(1974)	
Farewell Souvenir for piano	(1975)	
Recitativo, Arioso and Toccata for Violin	(1969–75)	
Two Poems for tuba	(1975)	
Quodlibet for double-bass and prerecorded tape	(1976)	
Six Bagatelles for harp	(1979)	
Graffito for marimba	(1988)	Commissioned by Nebojsa Jovan Zivkovic. Premiered: European Percussion Congress, Germany. Recordings: CD, "Nebojsa Zivkovic, "Percussion made in Europe, VOlume 1" Edition Musica Europea, Germany
Hommage a I.J. Paderewski for piano	(1992)	Premiered: 1992, Washington, D.C., Jerzy Stryjniak
Spider Walk for percussion	(1993)	Dedicated to Stanisław Skoczyński. Premiered: November 10, 1993, Columbus, Ohio, USA, Stanisław Skoczyński
Elegia: in Memoriam John Paul II for viola	(2005)	Premiered: 2005, Rekyavik, Iceland, Michael Hall

=== Multimedia works ===
Title	Date Composed	Notes
Soirée Snobe Chez La Princesse Instrumental Theatre	(1979)	for 2 keyboard instruments, prerecorded tape, mimes and lighting. Commissioned and premiered in 1979 by Annette Sachs and Piotr Lachert, Théâtre European de Musique Vivante, Brussels, Belgium

=== Music for children ===
Title	Date Composed	Notes
Suite Variée for percussion (4) and piano	(1965)	
Little Mosaic for percussion ensemble	(1968)	
Little Mexican Fantasy for percussion and piano	(1971)	Arrangement of a Mexican folk tune
Tunes from Many Countries of the World	(1977)	Children's songs arrangement for percussion and instruments
Journeys into Space for Piano in two volumes	(1978)	A set of 19 miniatures
Music of Five Steps for two flutes and percussion ensemble	(1979)	Commissioned by the International Society for Musical Education. First performance: July 12, 1980 by the pupils of E. Mlynarski Elementary School of Music in Warsaw, Poland, during the XIV World Congress of ISME
Miniatures for piano	(1982)	14 miniatures
Four Seasons for Four Hands	(1984)	12 pieces for Piano 4 hands
Silver Threads and Other Songs for Children	(1986)	for voice, chorus, and percussion in various combinations, to the poetry of Josef Czechowicz, in Polish
Musical Alphabet for two pianos	(1985–86)	A set of 22 pieces, mainly dances from A to Z
Mister Marimba- children's opera in 3 acts	(1992–95)	Soloists, children's choir and orchestra. To the libretto of Polish lyricist Agnieszka Osiecka; in Polish and also in English. Written for the National Opera in Warsaw, Poland. First performance: November 1997, National Opera in Warsaw
Magic Doremik- children's opera in 2 acts	(2007)	Soloists, children choir and orchestra. To the libretto of the composer. Written for the National Opera in Warsaw, Poland. First performance: 2008, National Opera in Warsaw

== Books ==
- Ptaszynska, Marta & Niewiadomska, Barbara; Colorful World of Percussion (1978) A book for percussion training in 5 volumes.
- about Ptaszyńska (in Polish):

Muzyka to język najdoskonalszy. Rozmowy z Martą Ptaszyńską, Kraków/Cracow PWM 2001

== See also ==
- Poles in Chicago
