= Lanesborough, Massachusetts =

Town in Massachusetts, United States

- Town
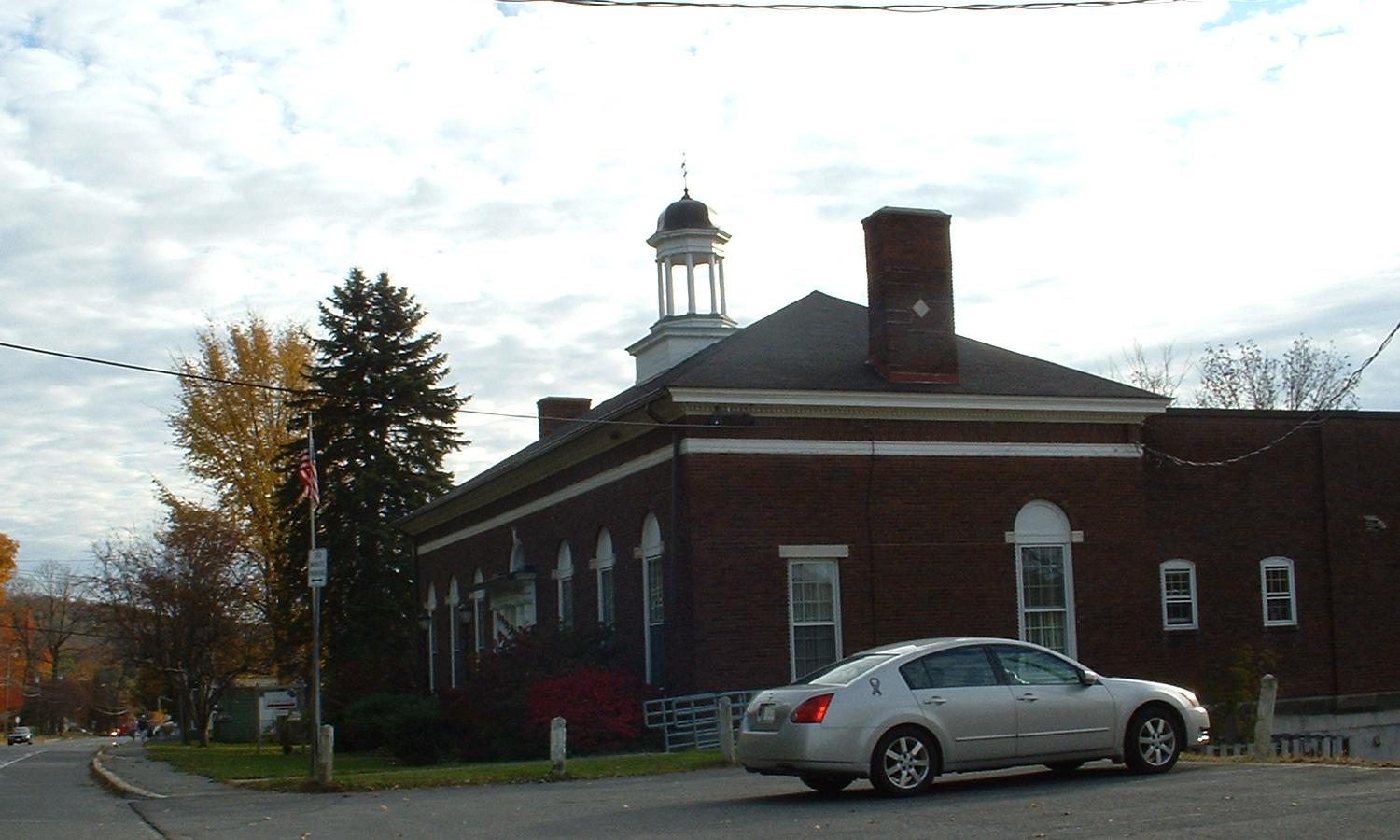
- Lanesborough Town Hall

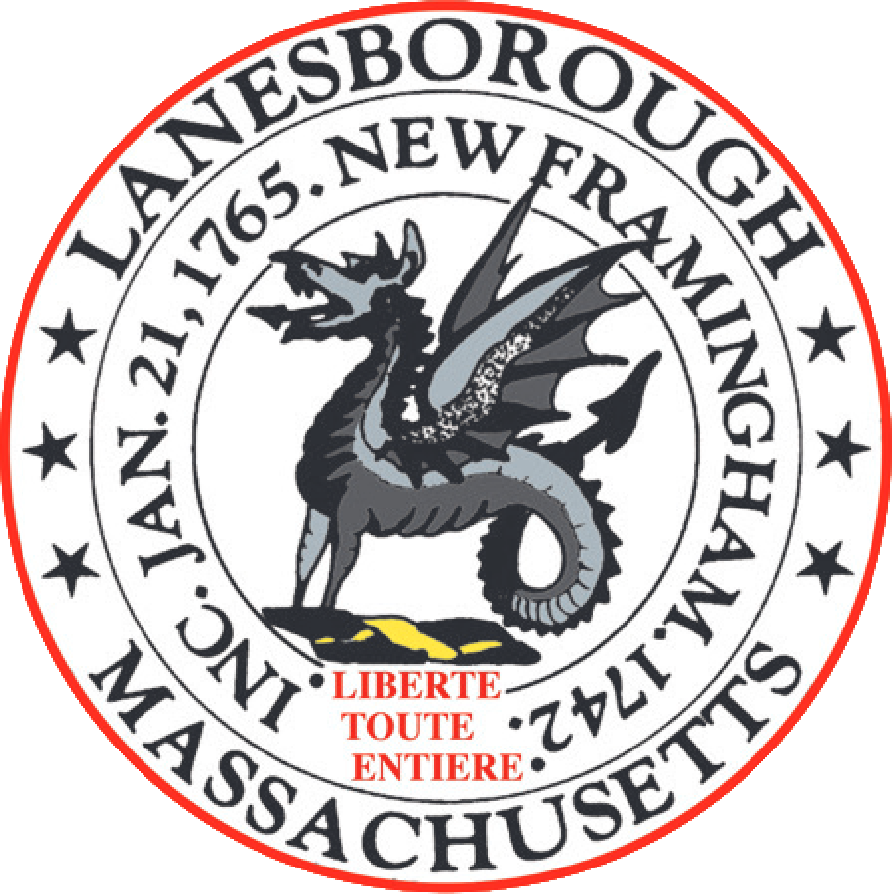
- Seal
- Nickname: New Framingham (former official name)
- Motto: Liberté Toute Entière (French) "Liberty Unfettered"
- Location in Berkshire County and the state of Massachusetts.
- Coordinates: 42°31′02″N 73°13′43″W
- Country: United States
- State: Massachusetts
- County: Berkshire
- Settled: 1753
- Incorporated: 1765

Government
  - Type: Open town meeting

Area
  - Total: 29.6 sq mi (76.6 km^{2})
  - Land: 28.8 sq mi (74.7 km^{2})
  - Water: 0.73 sq mi (1.9 km^{2})
- Elevation: 1,129 ft (344 m)

Population (2020)
  - Total: 3,038
  - Density: 105/sq mi (40.7/km^{2})
- Time zone: UTC−5 (Eastern)
  - Summer (DST): UTC−4 (Eastern)
- ZIP Codes: 01237 (Lanesborough); 01201 (Pittsfield); 01224 (Berkshire)
- Area code: 413
- FIPS code: 25-34340
- GNIS feature ID: 0618267
- Website: www.lanesborough-ma.gov

Lanesborough is a town in Berkshire County, Massachusetts, United States. It is part of the Pittsfield, Massachusetts Metropolitan Statistical Area. The population was 3,038 at the 2020 census.

== History ==
One of the first Berkshire communities to be settled, Lanesborough was originally known as "New Framingham", carved from part of Northern Berkshire Township #6. Lanesborough was first settled in 1753 and was officially incorporated on January 21, 1765. It was renamed Lanesborough, for the Countess of Lanesborough, a friend of Governor Francis Bernard, who incorporated the town. The town grew with small industry in the early 19th century, most of which settled along Town Brook. Berkshire Pleasure Park was a major attraction at the turn of the 20th century. It was one of the trolley parks along what is now Route 8 on the eastern side of town.

Today the town includes many small businesses, but has little industry of its own. More people from Lanesborough are employed in nearby communities.

The town's most famous resident was Josh Billings, born Henry Wheeler Shaw. He was a popular humorist in the nineteenth century, rivaling Mark Twain for popularity at the time. Historic sites include the Old Stone School, an unusual stone one-room schoolhouse, built in 1832 from funds donated by Ephraim Bradley and which operated as a school until 1950. The building is currently used as a photography gallery and guesthouse.

== Geography ==
According to the United States Census Bureau, the town has a total area of 29.6 square miles (76.6 km^{2}), of which 28.8 square miles (74.7 km^{2}) is land and 0.73 square miles (1.9 km^{2}), or 2.49%, is water.

Lanesborough is bordered by New Ashford to the north, Cheshire to the northeast, Dalton to the east, Pittsfield to the south, and Hancock to the west. The town center is 5 miles (8 km) north of Pittsfield, 50 miles (80 km) northwest of Springfield and 140 miles (230 km) west of Boston.

Lanesborough is situated in two valleys, with Town Brook running south through the central valley into Pontoosuc Lake, and the Cheshire Reservoir, the headwaters of the Hoosic River, running north through the town's smaller, eastern valley. To the north, the beginning of Mount Greylock is located in the town, with the auto road and visitors' center beginning there as well. Rockwell Road, which leads to the Visitors' Center, ascends from Lanesborough through Cheshire to the summit in Adams. Sperry Road, which branches off Rockwell, leads to a campground and picnic area. Pittsfield State Forest also has a large section within town, with Balance Rock being its main attraction. To the west, Jiminy Peak and Sheeps Heaven Mountain, the southern portion of Brodie Mountain, form much of the western border. While much of Jiminy Peak is located in the town of Hancock, recent aerial mapping determined that the summit is indeed in Lanesborough. The ski area's Hendricks Summit Lodge (named after Lanesborough residents Bart and Mary Hendricks) is located within the town. Brodie Mountain Road, which passes between these two mountains, is one of the few roads which lead into neighboring Hancock from the east. The very large Massachusetts Champion Elm stands on Summer Street, visible from Route 7. Lanesborough hosts the southern access to the Ashuwillticook Rail Trail, a bike path converted from a railway path.

U.S. Route 7 is the main route through town, passing from Pittsfield north towards Williamstown and Vermont. This road was once New England Interstate Route 4, which connected Norwalk, Connecticut, with the Canada–US border. To the east, Massachusetts Route 8, which was also a New England Interstate Route, passes through the village of Berkshire towards North Adams. Route 8 lies along a route of the Berkshire Regional Transit Authority bus line. Regional bus and air service can both be found in Pittsfield, with the nearest airport with national flights being Albany International Airport.

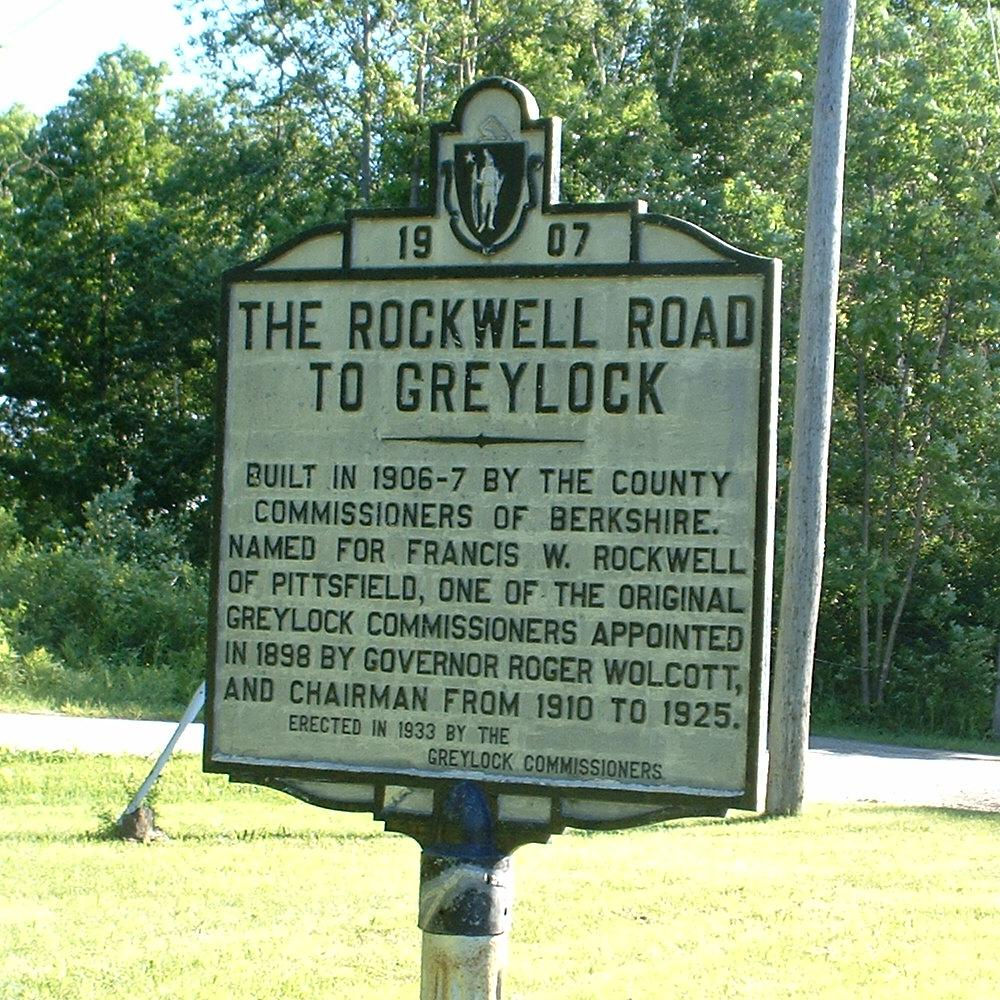
The entrance to Rockwell Road, which extends from Lanesborough to the summit of Mount Greylock in Adams

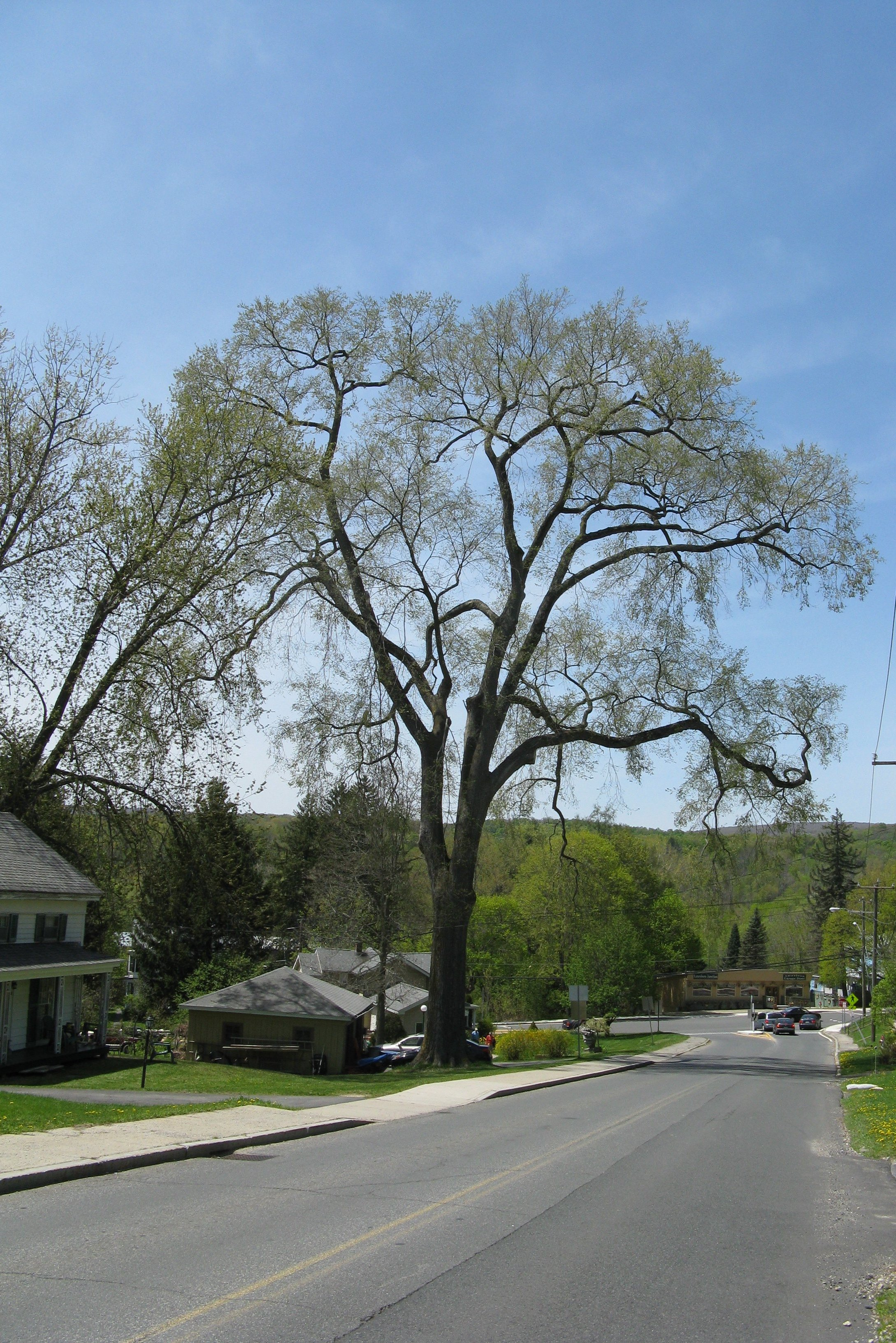
The Champion Elm

== Demographics ==
Historical population
Year	Pop.	±%
1790	2,142	—
1850	1,229	−42.6%
1860	1,308	+6.4%
1870	1,393	+6.5%
1880	1,286	−7.7%
1890	1,018	−20.8%
1900	780	−23.4%
1910	947	+21.4%
1920	1,054	+11.3%
1930	1,170	+11.0%
1940	1,321	+12.9%
1950	2,069	+56.6%
1960	2,933	+41.8%
1970	2,972	+1.3%
1980	3,131	+5.3%
1990	3,032	−3.2%
2000	2,990	−1.4%
2010	3,091	+3.4%
2020	3,038	−1.7%
2022*	3,016	−0.7%
* = population estimate. Source: United States census records and Population Estimates Program data.

As of the census of 2000, there were 2,990 people, 1,203 households, and 839 families residing in the town. By population, Lanesborough ranks eleventh out of the 32 cities and towns in Berkshire County, and 273rd out of 351 cities and towns in Massachusetts. The population density was 103.0 inhabitants per square mile (39.8/km^{2}), ranking it 11th and 279th in the county and Commonwealth, respectively. There were 1,382 housing units at an average density of 47.6 per square mile (18.4/km^{2}). The racial makeup of the town was 97.36% White, 0.70% African American, 0.03% Native American, 0.80% Asian, 0.03% Pacific Islander, 0.17% from other races, and 0.90% from two or more races. Hispanic or Latino of any race were 0.67% of the population.

There were 1,203 households, out of which 32.8% had children under the age of 18 living with them, 56.4% were married couples living together, 9.5% had a female householder with no husband present, and 30.2% were non-families. Of all households, 23.9% were made up of individuals, and 9.1% had someone living alone who was 65 years of age or older. The average household size was 2.48 and the average family size was 2.95.

In the town, the population was spread out, with 23.9% under the age of 18, 6.0% from 18 to 24, 29.4% from 25 to 44, 27.7% from 45 to 64, and 13.0% who were 65 years of age or older. The median age was 40 years. For every 100 females, there were 96.7 males. For every 100 females age 18 and over, there were 95.0 males.

The median income for a household in the town was $46,496, and the median income for a family was $51,887. Males had a median income of $37,672 versus $24,583 for females. The per capita income for the town was $21,106. About 3.7% of families and 5.7% of the population were below the poverty line, including 5.0% of those under age 18 and 8.0% of those age 65 or over.

== Government ==
Lanesborough employs the open town meeting form of government, and is led by a board of selectmen. The town operates its own police, fire and public works departments. The town library, located in the annex of the town hall, is connected to the regional library networks.

On the state level, Lanesborough is represented in the Massachusetts House of Representatives as part of the First Berkshire District, which covers north Berkshire County and is represented by John Barrett. In the Massachusetts Senate, the town is part of the Berkshire, Hampshire and Franklin district, which includes all of Berkshire County and western Hampshire and Franklin counties, represented by Adam Hinds. On the national level, Lanesborough is represented in the United States House of Representatives by Richard Neal as part of Massachusetts's 1st congressional district.

== Education ==
Lanesborough, along with Hancock, New Ashford, and Williamstown form the Mount Greylock Regional School District, which includes a middle school and a high school. The town operates Pontoosuc Regional Elementary School for students from pre-kindergarten through sixth grade along with New Ashford, with the upper grades attending Mount Greylock Regional High School in Williamstown. Additionally, there are private, parochial, charter and vocation schools in the nearby towns.

The nearest community college, Berkshire Community College, is in Pittsfield. The nearest state college is Massachusetts College of Liberal Arts in North Adams, and the nearest university is the University of Massachusetts Amherst. Williams College in Williamstown is the nearest private college.

== Notable people ==
- Josh Billings, humorist, was born here
- Henry Shaw Briggs, brigadier general during the American Civil War, born here
- Sarah B. Capron, evangelical missionary
- Bette Davis, actress, attended the Crestalban School on Summer Street for three years
- Guy H. Preston, U.S. Army brigadier general, raised in Lanesborough
- Ethan Zuckerman, writer and internet scholar

== Sister city ==
- Lanesborough, County Longford, Ireland
