= Maxine Neuman =

American cellist based in New York City

Maxine Neuman (July 1948 – December 13, 2022) was an American cellist based in New York City.

== Biography ==
Neuman was born on July 1948, in New York, New York, and died on December 13, 2022. After cello studies under Bernard Greenhouse from 1968 to 1970, and after obtaining both a Bachelor of Arts in cello and a master's degree from the Manhattan School of Music, she embarked on a career as a chamber musician, orchestra musician, and educator. She co-founded the Walden Trio, the Vermont Cello Quartet, the Crescent String Quartet, the Claremont Duo, and Duo Cellisimo.

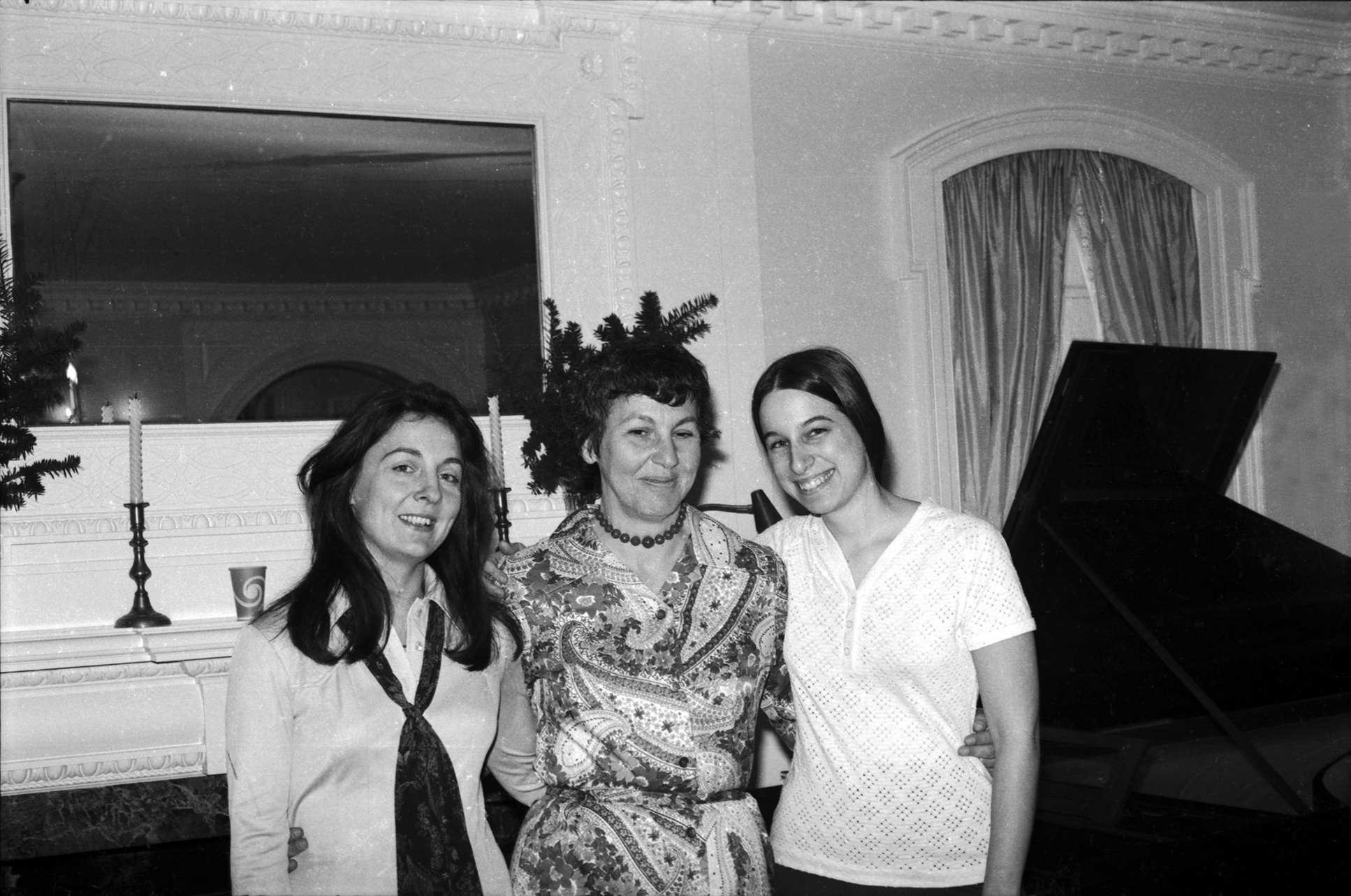
The Walden Trio - Gwendolyn Mansfield, flute; Joan Stein, piano; Maxine Neuman, cello

In the 1980s, she was appointed principal cellist of the Orchestra of St. Luke's. She left her principal cellist chair to accept a faculty cello teaching position at Bennington College in Vermont while also maintaining an active international performing schedule, frequently touring with her various chamber groups in Europe and the United States.

In 1994, after Bennington College's financial upheaval, Neuman left Bennington and returned to New York City, teaching, and continuing her active international performing schedule.

In addition to her faculty position at Bennington College, Neuman has taught cello at Williams College, Long Island University C. W. Post Campus, the Hoff-Barthelson Music School, and New York City's School for Strings. She is also active as a coach of chamber musicians at the Manhattan School of Music and the Chamber Music Conference and Composers' Forum of the East.

She was a member of the Orchestra of St. Luke's, American Classical Orchestra, American Composers Orchestra, and the Westchester Philharmonic. She has been awarded grants from the Rockefeller Foundation, the Ford Foundation, and the National Endowment for the Arts.

== Recordings ==
Neuman recorded for Deutsche Grammophon, Columbia, Angel, EMI, Nonesuch, ECM, Biddulph, CRI, Orion, Leonarda, Argo, Opus One, Sony/Virgin, AMC, Artek, Vanguard, Musical Heritage, Albany, Northeastern and CBS World Records. Her efforts have earned three Grammy Awards.

== Instrument ==
Neuman played a G. B. Guadagnini cello, dating from 1772.

== External resources ==
- Maxine Neuman Songs, Albums, Reviews, Bio & More
- Maxine Neuman, Cello
- Maxine Neuman's website
