= Daniel Strong Godfrey =

American composer (born 1949)

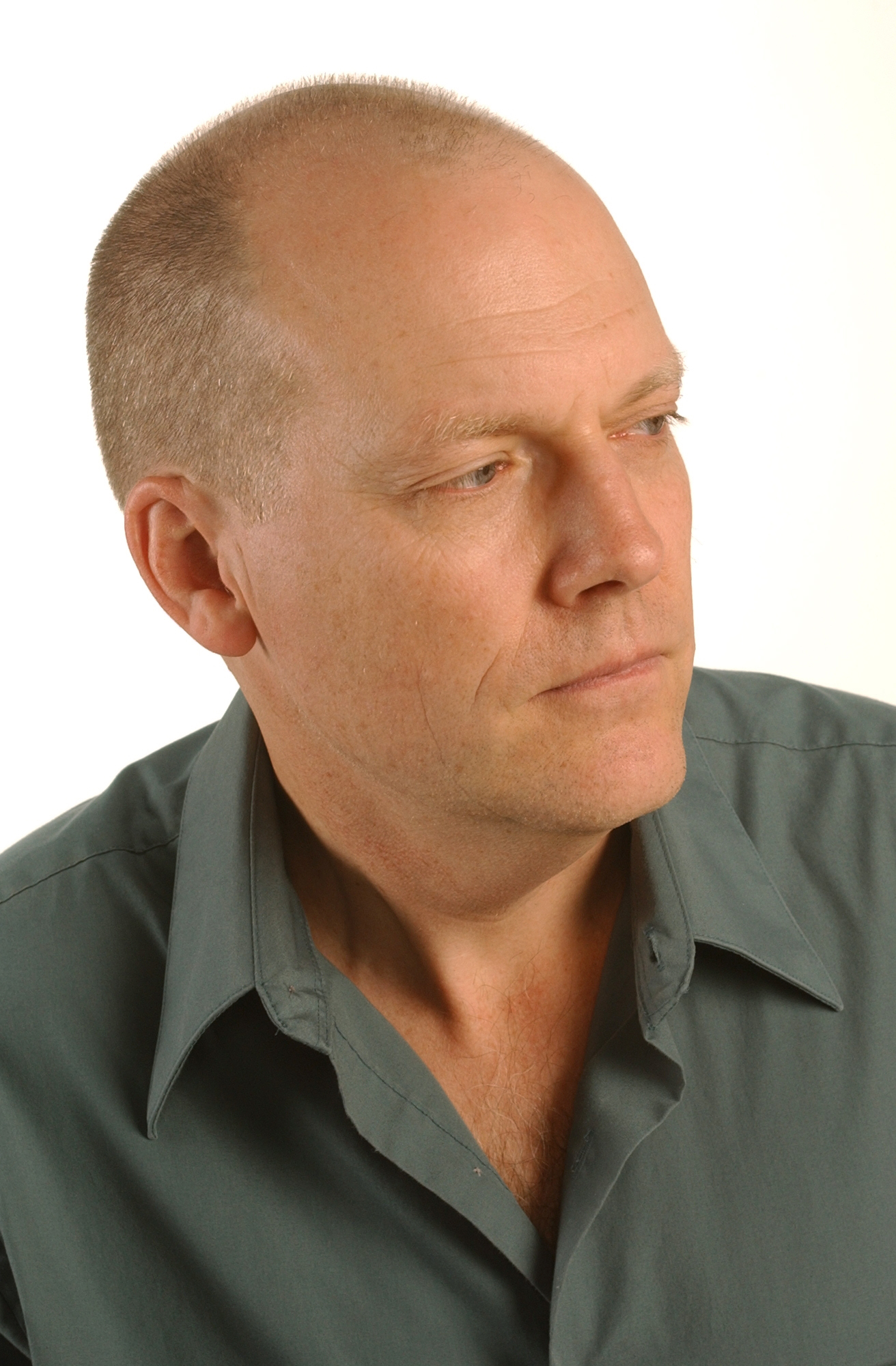
Daniel Godfrey, American Composer

Daniel Strong Godfrey (born 1949 in [Bryn Mawr, PA]) is an American composer who has written for symphonic bands as well as a large body of chamber and orchestral music.

He began composing at the age of eight while his family was living in Ankara and latter studied with Mario Davidovsky, Robert Morris, Martin Jenni and Richard Hervig, earning degrees from Yale and the University of Iowa.

Daniel Strong Godfrey has earned awards and commissions from the J.S. Guggenheim Memorial Foundation, the American Academy of Arts and Letters, the Fromm Music Foundation, the Rockefeller Foundation, the Bogliasco Foundation, the Koussevitzky Music Foundation, and the Barlow Endowment for Music Composition, among many others. His music has been performed by soloists, chamber ensembles and orchestras throughout the U.S. and abroad. He is founder and co-director of the Seal Bay Festival of American Chamber Music (on the Maine coast) and is co-author of Music Since 1945, published by Schirmer Books. Godfrey's works are recorded on Albany, Bridge, CRI, GM, Innova, Klavier, Koch, and Mark compact discs. His music is available through publishers Carl Fischer and G.Schirmer.

Godfrey received his graduate degrees in composition from Yale University and the University of Iowa. He is Professor and Chair in the Department of Music at Northeastern University's College of Arts, Media and Design in Boston, MA. Prior to his recent appointment at Northeastern, Godfrey was Professor of Music Composition, Theory and History at Syracuse University's Setnor School of Music. He has also held guest faculty appointments in composition at the Eastman School of Music and the Indiana University School of Music.
