= Reed & Reed =

- Type: Private
- Industry: Construction
- Founded: 1928
- Headquarters: Woolwich, Maine, United States
- Products: Bridges, buildings, wind power, parking garages
- Website: www.reed-reed.com

Reed & Reed Inc. is a private general contractor based in Woolwich, Maine. Its services include preliminary services, permitting assistance, design and resource identification, master scheduling, budget development, equipment handling and logistics, project management, and maintenance services.

== History ==
Founded in 1928 by Captain Josiah W. Reed and son Carlton Day Reed, the initial capital was roughly $2,000. By 1930, Reed & Reed was already beginning its first bridge construction projects. These would come to define the company's image for nearly five decades.

Although founded in 1928, Reed & Reed, Inc. was first incorporated in 1982. Since then, operations have continued to grow and expand. In 1992, RR Caribbean Inc. was established in St. Thomas to handle the company's Caribbean ambitions. Only two years later, in 1994, the company purchased Callahan Brothers, Inc., a leading competitor in contracting and design.

The company began a project in 2003 as a joint venture with rival Cianbro Inc. The Penobscot Narrows Bridge and Observatory, which has become a Maine landmark, began construction following a competitive bid among many contractors. Other high-profile undertakings included one of New England's largest wind farms, located in Mars Hill, Maine, and the new Ocean Gateway pier for cruise ships in Portland, Maine.

In 2022, it was announced that Reed & Reed would lead the Maine Department of Transportation's replacement of a deteriorated bridge in Woolwich and add another new bridge to the project to address flooding concerns.

== Expansion ==
While many of Reed & Reed's projects are located in Maine, job sites are scattered all over New England and the Caribbean. Although the bridge contracts continue to provide millions in revenue for the company every year, it has recently begun pursuing wind energy as a major initiative. As part of this, the corporate logo, as seen on their website, has added wind mills.

Often used by the State of Maine's Department of Transportation for large- and small-scale projects.

In 2017, Reed & Reed purchased PLC Construction, an electrical transmission contractor, based out of New Hampshire. PLC Construction was often a subcontractor of Reed & Reed and employed approximately 40 workers at the time of purchase.
