= Louis Calabro =

American classical composer (1926-1991)

Louis Calabro (November 1, 1926 – October 21, 1991) was an Italian American orchestral composer.

== Biography ==
Calabro studied piano and composition at Juilliard School of Music. Vincent Persichetti was his principal teacher there.

Louis Calabro was a music professor at Bennington College of Vermont from 1955 until his death in 1991. He was a composer, teacher, conductor and a percussionist. His students included the American composer Patsy Rogers.

Calabro's original music is published by Elkan-Vogel, Theodore Presser, Tuba Press and Morningstar Music. Calabro has over 100 works to his credit including music for traditional and non-traditional chamber combinations as well as for both large and small orchestral ensembles most notably in America. Calabro believed in writing music for those he knew best and had the distinction of hearing virtually everything he wrote performed during his lifetime. There are many recordings of these performances as well as scores archived at Bennington College and at the University of Vermont.

Louis Calabro founded the Sage City Symphony in 1972, an ambitious community orchestra in southwestern Vermont which is still active and continues to commission new works. Calabro believed strongly in encouraging and promoting contemporary music, at a time when few American orchestras (professional or amateur) were performing premieres. With the Symphony, he commissioned dozens of new orchestral works and conducted their premieres. Composers whose work was premiered under his baton include Marta Ptaszynska and Vivian Fine.

He was a recipient of numerous awards including two Guggenheim Fellowships and two Elizabeth Coolidge Chamber Music Awards, plus grants from the National Endowment on the Arts and the Bicentennial Commission, and the Vermont Governor's Award for Excellence in the Arts (1992).
