= Caroline Mallonée =

Caroline Mallonée (born 1975) is an American composer best known for her choral works. She is also the artistic director of the Creative Musicians Retreat, part of The Walden School's summer offerings.

She attended Harvard University, where she studied with Bernard Rands and Mario Davidovsky, receiving her bachelor's degree in 1997. For her master's degree she attended Yale University, where she studied with Joseph Schwantner and Evan Ziporyn, receiving her degree in 2000. In 2005 she received a Fulbright fellowship to study with Louis Andriessen at the Royal Conservatory of The Hague. In 2006 she received her Ph.D. from Duke University, where she studied with Scott Lindroth and Stephen Jaffe.

Her music has been performed in Carnegie Hall, at Lincoln Center, Bargemusic, Town Hall, Roulette, Symphony Space, Tokyo Opera City, and National Sawdust. Commissions include the Buffalo Philharmonic Orchestra, the Prism Quartet, the Firebird Ensemble and the Wet Ink Ensemble.

She has been recognized with awards from the Fromm Foundation, ASCAP, the Jerome Foundation and the Fulbright Foundation.

She resides in Buffalo, New York, where she is composer-in-residence for the Buffalo Chamber Players. The Buffalo Chamber Players recorded and released her collection of scordatura music, "String Tunes."
