= Amherst Area Chamber of Commerce =

Local chamber of commerce in Massachusetts, US

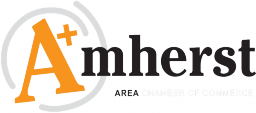
- Founded: 1956
- Type: Advocacy group
- Purpose: Business advocacy
- Location: Amherst, Massachusetts
- Coordinates: 42°22′32.3″N 72°31′14.1″W
- Region served: Amherst, Hadley, Shutesbury, Leverett, Pelham, Sunderland, and Belchertown
- Method: Business networking Media attention Programming; Political lobbying
- Key people: Don Courtemanche, Executive Director
- Website: Official Website of Amherst Area Chamber of Commerce

The Amherst Area Chamber of Commerce is the local chamber of commerce for portions of Hampshire and Franklin counties within the Pioneer Valley of Massachusetts.

== Chamber model ==
The Amherst Area Chamber is supported by members' dues and fundraising activities. Membership is open to anyone. Membership dues are based upon a sliding scale based on the number of employees. The Chamber is a partner organization of the Greater Northampton Chamber and Greater Easthampton Chamber that forms the management of the Hampshire County Regional Tourism Council.

The Amherst Area Chamber of Commerce is divided into Councils, with each Council being an advocate for different interests of the members or responsible for the hosting of various chamber events throughout the year.

== Member benefits ==
The chamber offers benefits to businesses once they become members. They include services in the areas of marketing, advertising, educational support, ribbon cutting ceremonies, referrals, networking, business advocacy, special discounts, and group buying power.

== Issues ==
The Amherst Area Chamber supported the ban on disposable food and drink containers made from expanded polystyrene (commonly called Styrofoam) beginning on January 1, 2014, in the town of Amherst. The chamber hoped that prices for alternative containers would go down for local restaurants affected businesses as paper-based containers become more popular.

== Events ==
The annual Taste of Amherst is one of the most popular events that the Amherst Area Chamber of Commerce hosts. It draws over 20,000 people to eat at over 20 local restaurants that set up tents on the Amherst town common. There are also bounce houses, face painting for children, and a beer tent for adults. The Taste of Amherst has had a large effort in the past few years to "green up the event". All of the plates and silverware are made of compostable materials. There are three stations where patrons bring their trash to be sorted into recycling, compost, and waste.

== Members ==
- AEIOU Occupational & Urgent Healthcare
- Alan Hurwitz Associates
- Amethyst Farm
- Amherst College
- Berkshire Gas
- Elements Hot Tub Spa
- Emily Dickinson Museum
- Fine Interior Painting
- Ford Gillen Architects
- Hilltown Tree and Garden
- Jean Lukens, LICSW
- Law Office of Greta LaMountain Biagi
- Lincoln Real Estate
- Marney Electrical Services
- Modern Memoirs Private Publishing
- Moira Clingman Design
- Northeast Solar
- Off The Wall Games
- Osteo Naturals
- Stakeholders Capital
- The Loose Goose Cafe
- Thomas A Warger Consulting
- Traditional Health First
- Valley Nutritional Counseling
- Valley Generators
- Western Massachusetts Electric Company
- WGBY-TV
- Wheatberry Bakery & Cafe
- Whirl Wind Farm Kennel

=== Legislative members ===
- U.S. Representative James McGovern
- Massachusetts State Senator Stan Rosenberg
- Massachusetts State Representative John Scibak
- Massachusetts State Representative Ellen Story
- Town of Hadley, Massachusetts
