= Solomon Goldstein-Rose =

American politician

Member of the Massachusetts House of Representatives from the 3rd Hampshire district
- In office January 4, 2017 – January 2, 2019
- Preceded by: Ellen Story
- Succeeded by: Mindy Domb

Personal details
- Born: December 5, 1993 (age 32)
- Citizenship: United States
- Party: Independent (since 2018); Democratic (2016-2018)
- Education: Brown University

Solomon Goldstein-Rose (born December 5, 1993) is an American politician, climate activist, and author, who served in the Massachusetts House of Representatives. From 2017 to 2019 he represented the 3rd Hampshire district (includes Amherst, Pelham, and Precinct 1 of Granby).

Goldstein-Rose ran for an open State Rep seat during his last semester of college and the following summer, at age 22. He won the 6-way Democratic primary in September 2016 and was uncontested in the general election in November 2016. Goldstein-Rose's campaign platform focused on his youth and energy to push for system change, with an emphasis on clean energy and education policy. Once in the legislature he introduced bills related to clean energy, K-12 education, and election reform, and joined the Progressive Caucus in pushing for criminal justice reform and other policies. Halfway through his term, he switched his voter registration to unenrolled (Independent) on February 20, 2018, to emphasize current problems with the two-party system and spark conversations about partisanship and national political discourse.

During his term in office, Goldstein-Rose created several civic engagement and civic education programs, including a monthly free dessert discussion, an "UnCampaign" in which he knocked on doors during election off-season to speak with unlikely voters about state politics, a CivicsFest celebration and contest organized with the League of Women Voters of Amherst, talks about government and political issues at local schools, and a monthly guest column in the Amherst Bulletin in which Goldstein-Rose explained details of the Massachusetts legislature's process and discussed current issues. Goldstein-Rose was also part of a working group that created and successfully passed a bill requiring hands-on civic education in Massachusetts schools.

Goldstein-Rose is a 2016 graduate of Brown University, where he studied Engineering and Public Policy. He previously interned in the Obama White House, in a Senate office, and on a Senate campaign. During college he founded the Rhode Island carbon pricing campaign. Before college, Goldstein-Rose served as a full member of the Amherst-Pelham Regional School Committee at age 18 while in 12th grade, filling out the end of a term when a member moved away. He has been a climate activist since age 11.

Goldstein-Rose cancelled his 2018 re-election campaign at the end of the legislative term, announcing he would instead shift to full-time nationally and globally focused work on climate change. He synthesized research, outreach, and analysis into a framework for the comprehensive picture of solving climate change. That framework became his book, The 100% Solution (publication date March 31, 2020).

He is Jewish.
