= Montague Airport =

Montague Airport may refer to:

- Montague Airport (California) in Montague, California, United States (FAA: 1O5)
- Smiths Falls-Montague Airport in Smiths Falls, Ontario, Canada (IATA: YSH)

Other airports in places named Montague:

- Siskiyou County Airport in Montague, California, United States (FAA: SIY)
- Turners Falls Airport in Montague, Massachusetts, United States (FAA: 0B5)
