= ARPS =

ARPS may refer to:

- Aerospace Research Pilot School
- Amherst-Pelham Regional School District
- Associate of the Royal Photographic Society
- Auction rate preferred stock
