= Amherst, Massachusetts =

- City
- Town of Amherst
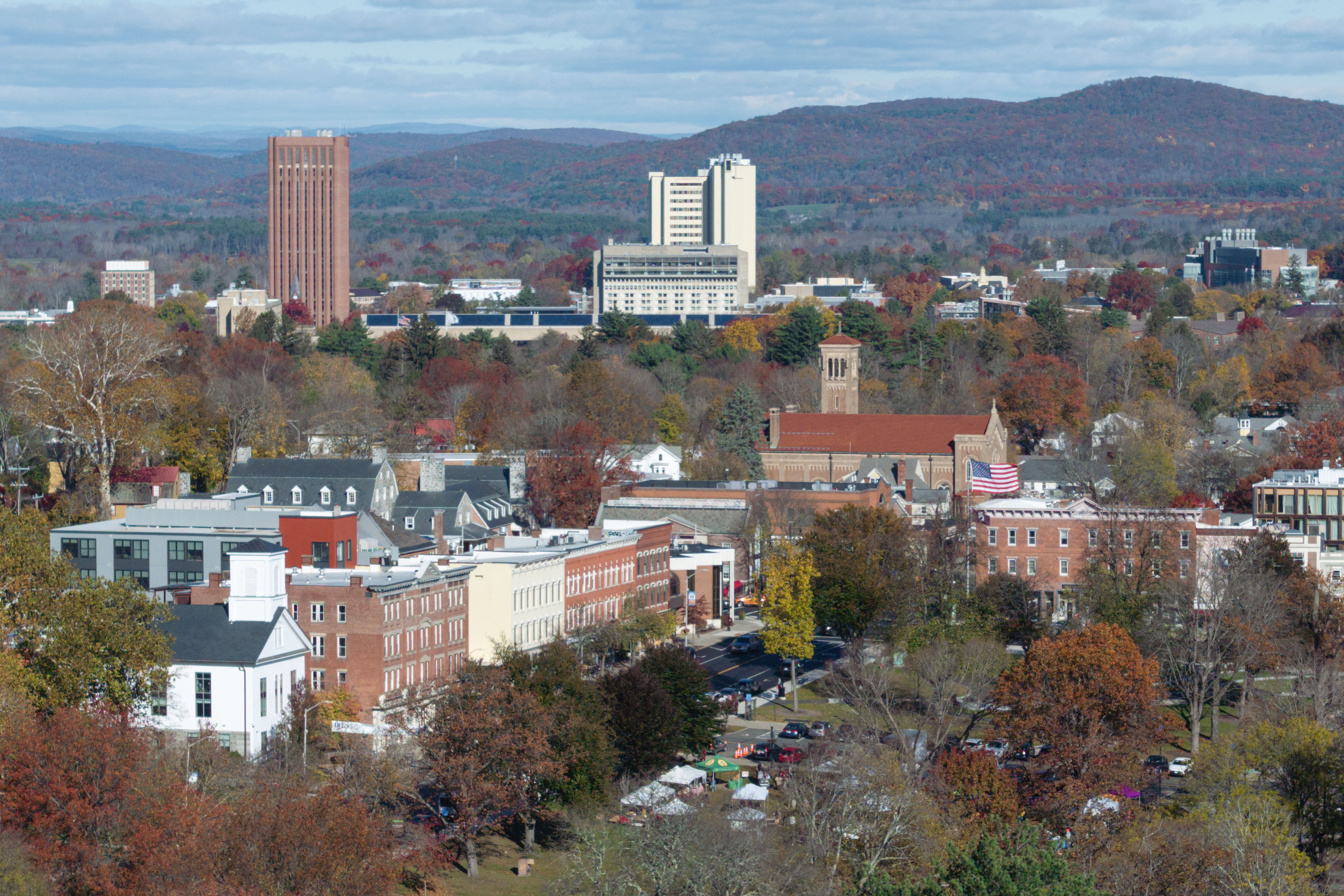
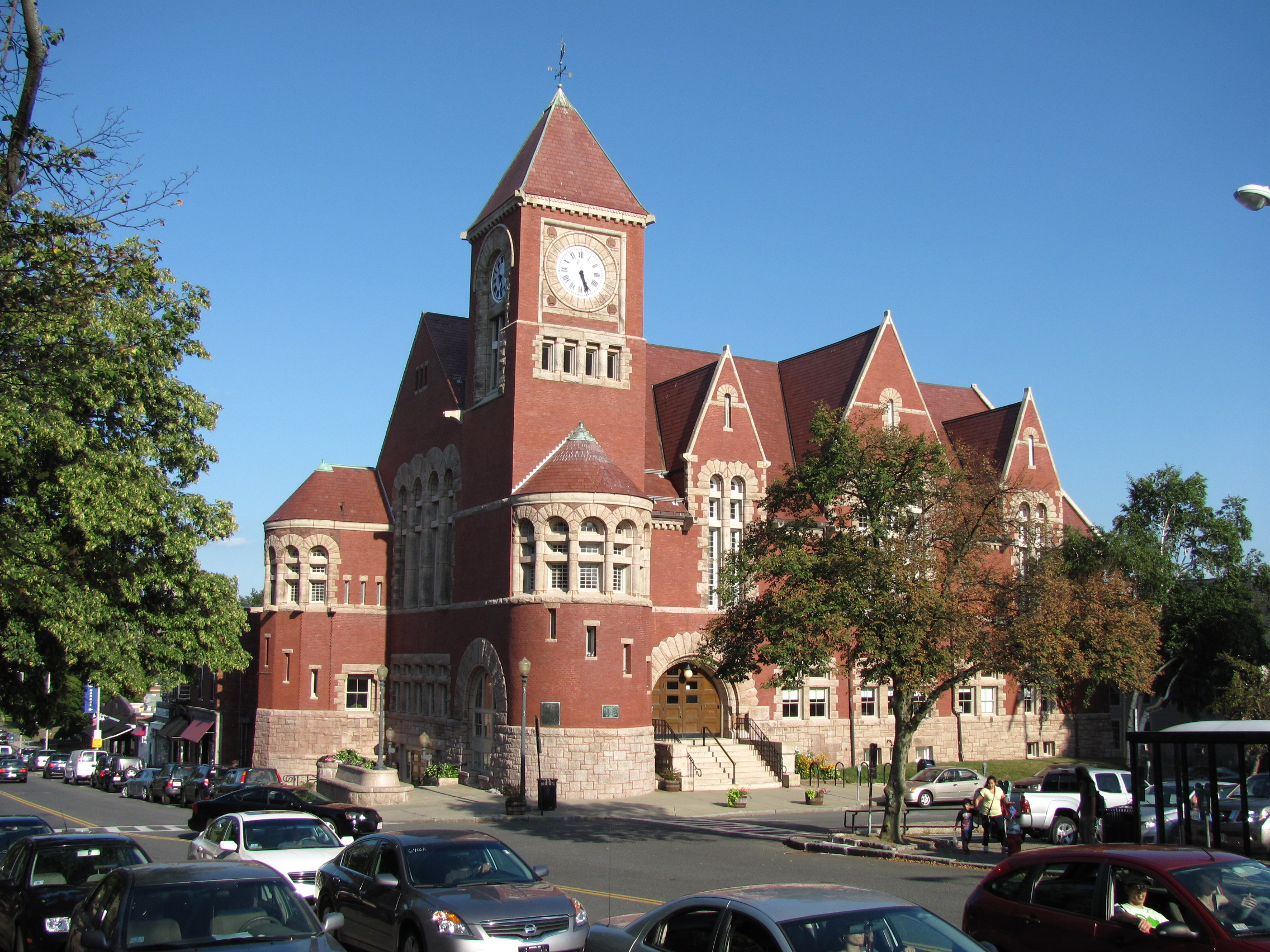
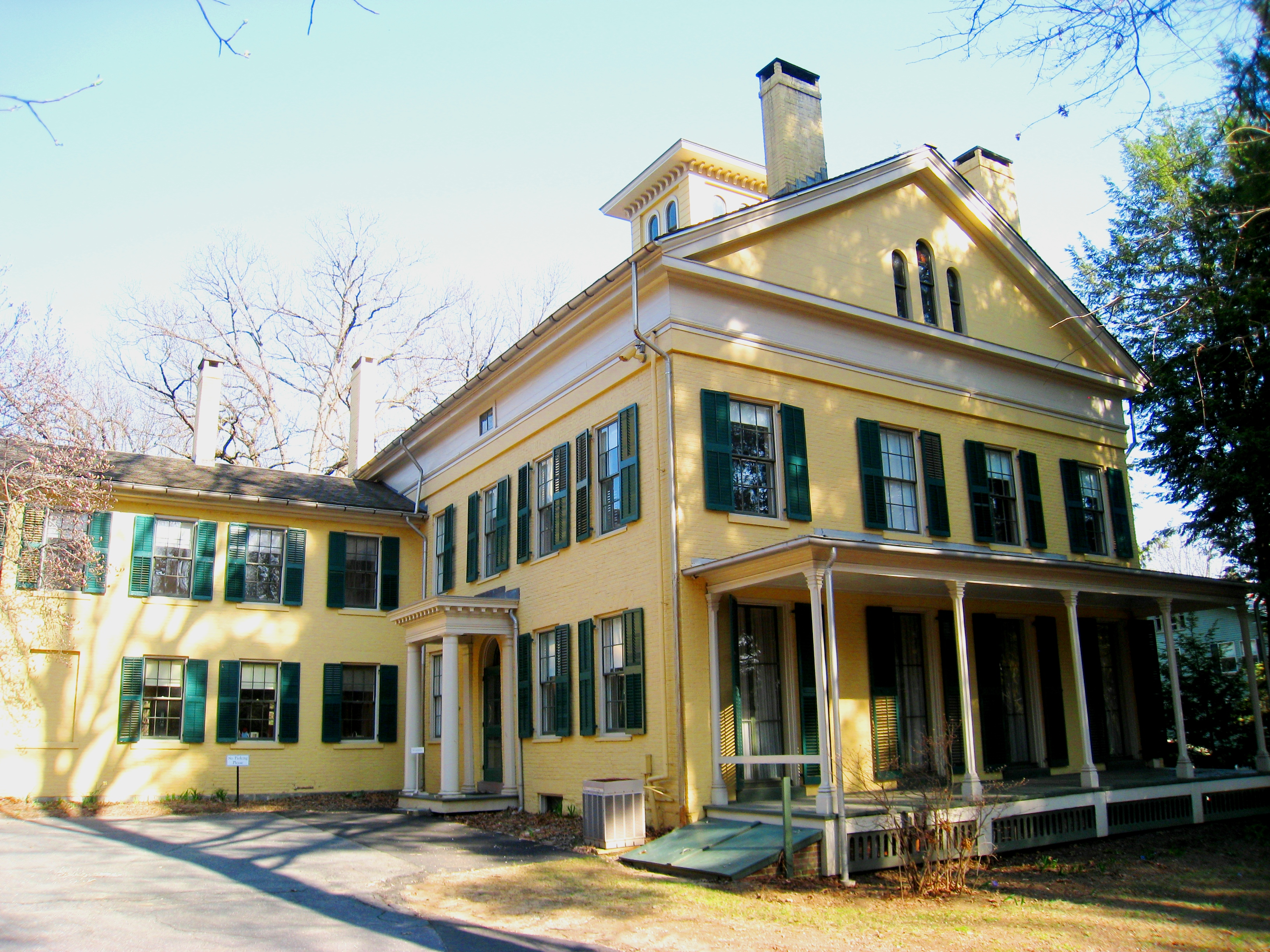
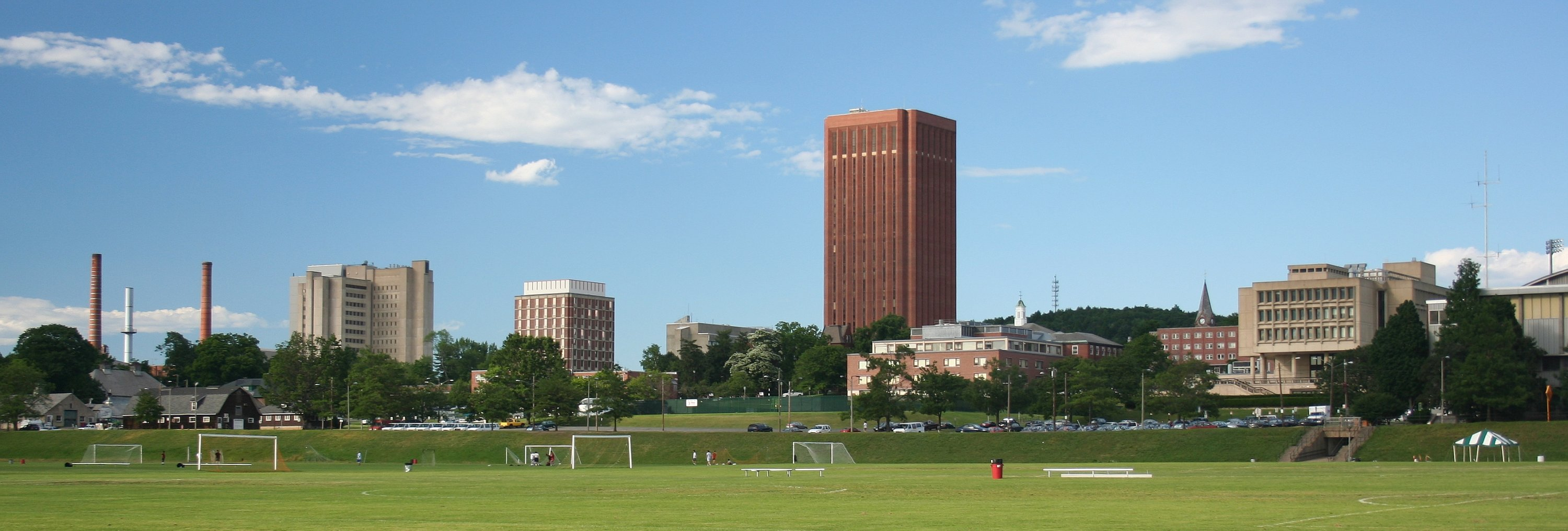
- Downtown Amherst, with UMass in the background Town Hall Emily Dickinson Museum University of Massachusetts Amherst

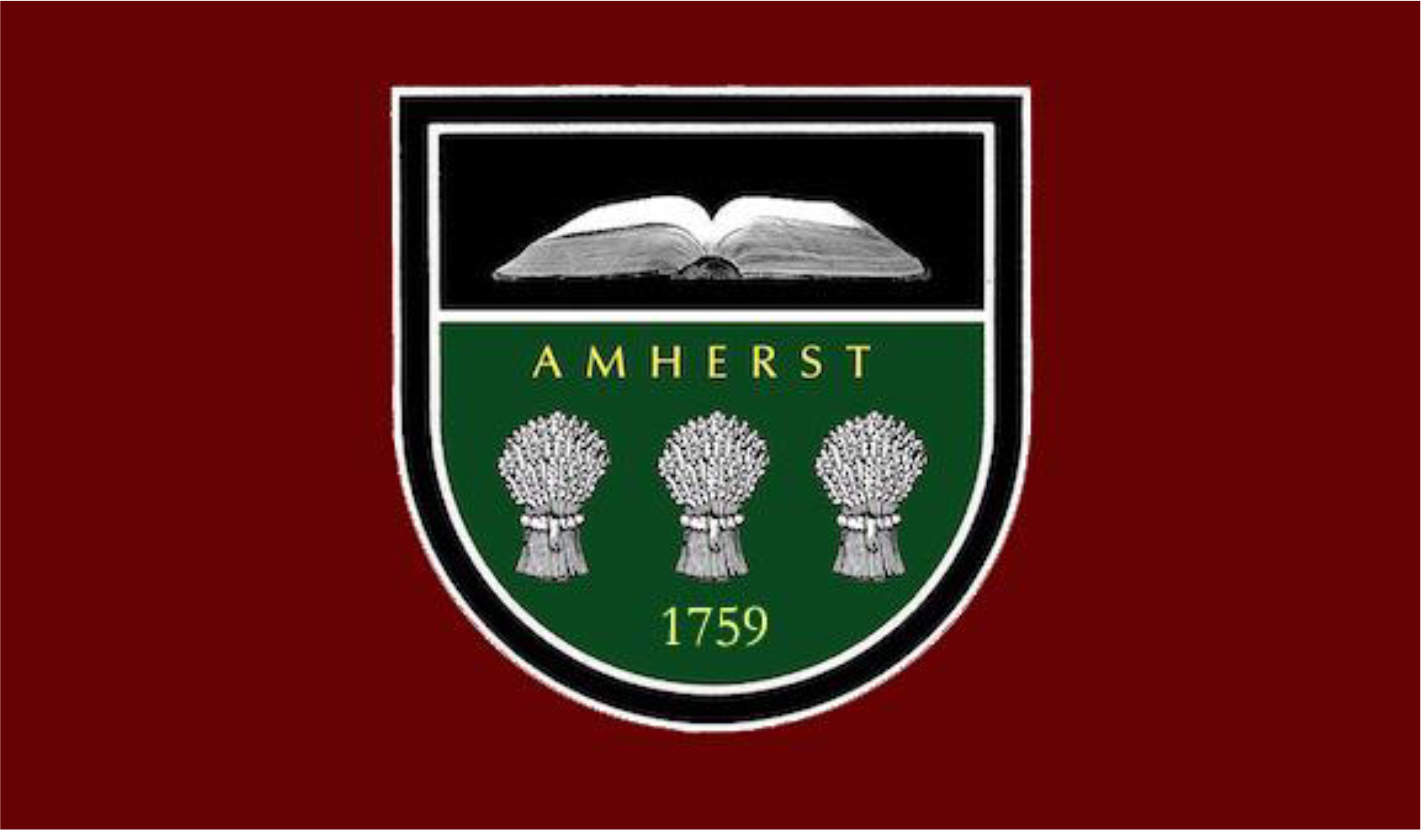
- Flag Seal
- Nickname: "The People's Republic of Amherst"
- Location in Hampshire County in Massachusetts

- Location within Massachusetts Location within the United States Location within North America
- Coordinates: 42°23′N 72°31′W
- Country: United States
- State: Massachusetts
- County: Hampshire
- Settled: 1703
- Incorporated: February 13, 1759
- Named for: Jeffery Amherst, 1st Baron Amherst

Government
  - Type: Council–manager

Area
  - Total: 27.7 sq mi (71.8 km^{2})
  - Land: 27.6 sq mi (71.5 km^{2})
  - Water: 0.12 sq mi (0.3 km^{2})
- Elevation: 300 ft (90 m)

Population (2020)
  - Total: 39,263
  - Density: 1,422/sq mi (549.1/km^{2})
- Time zone: UTC−5 (Eastern)
  - Summer (DST): UTC−4 (Eastern)
- ZIP Codes: 01002 (Amherst); 01003 (UMass); 01004 (post office boxes); 01059 (North Amherst)
- Area code: 413
- FIPS code: 25-01325
- GNIS feature ID: 0618195
- Website: www.amherstma.gov

Amherst (/ˈæmərst/) is a city in Hampshire County, Massachusetts, United States, in the Connecticut River valley. Amherst has a council–manager form of government, and is considered a city under Massachusetts state law. Amherst is one of several Massachusetts municipalities that have city forms of government but retain "The Town of" in their official names. At the 2020 census, the population was 39,263, making it the most populated municipality in Hampshire County (although the county seat is Northampton). The town is home to Amherst College, Hampshire College, and the University of Massachusetts Amherst, three of the Five Colleges.

Amherst has three census-designated places: Amherst Center, North Amherst, and South Amherst.

Amherst is part of the Springfield, Massachusetts Metropolitan Statistical Area. Lying 22 miles (35 km) north of the city of Springfield, Amherst is considered the northernmost town in the Hartford–Springfield Metropolitan Region, "The Knowledge Corridor". Amherst is also located in the Pioneer Valley, which encompasses Hampshire, Hampden and Franklin counties.

== Name ==
The name of the town is pronounced without the h ("AM-erst") by natives and long-time residents, giving rise to the local saying, "only the 'h' is silent", in reference both to the pronunciation and to the town's politically active populace.

== History ==
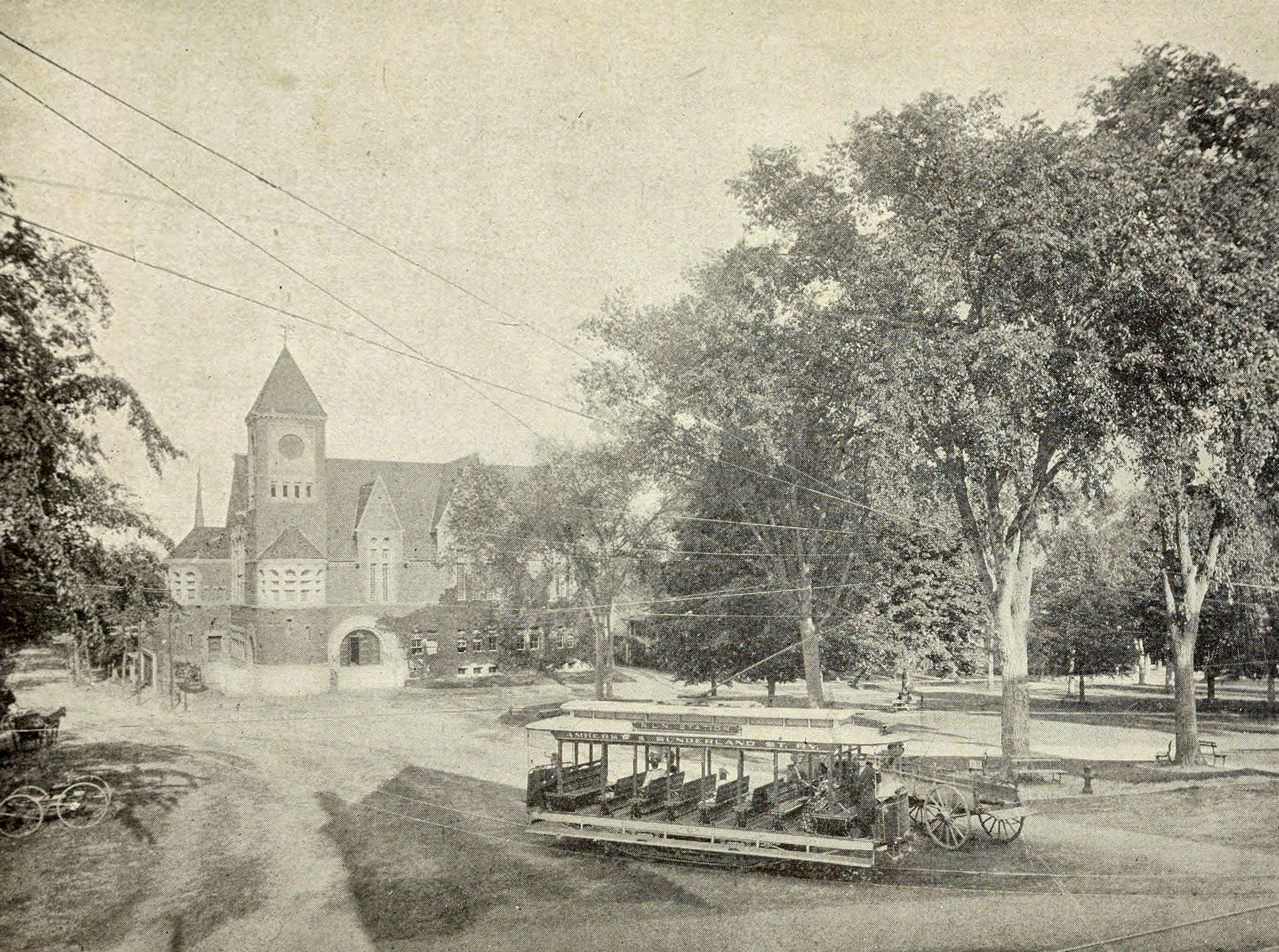
A streetcar for the Amherst and Sunderland Street Railway crosses Amherst Center, in front of the town hall, c. 1903.

The earliest known document of the lands now comprising Amherst is the deed of purchase dated December 1658 between John Pynchon of Springfield and three native inhabitants, referred to as Umpanchla, Quonquont, and Chickwalopp. According to the deed, "ye Indians of Nolwotogg (Norwottuck) upon ye River of Quinecticott (Connecticut)" sold the entire area in exchange for "two Hundred fatham of Wampam & Twenty fatham, and one large Coate at Eight fatham wch Chickwollop set of, of trusts, besides severall small giftes" [sic].

Amherst was first visited by Europeans no later than 1665, when Nathaniel Dickinson surveyed the lands for its mother town Hadley. The first permanent English settlements arrived in 1727. It remained a part of Hadley, even when it gained precinct status in 1734, before becoming a township in 1759.

When it incorporated, the colonial governor assigned the town the name "Amherst" after Jeffery Amherst, 1st Baron Amherst. Many a colonial governor at the time scattered his name during the influx of new town applications, which is why several towns in the Northeast bear the name. Amherst was Commander-in-Chief of the forces of North America during the French and Indian War who, according to popular legend, singlehandedly won Canada for the British and banished France from North America. Popular belief has it that he supported the American side in the Revolutionary War and resigned his commission rather than fight for the British. Baron Amherst actually remained in the service of the Crown during the war—albeit in Great Britain rather than North America—where he organized the defense against the proposed Franco-Spanish Armada of 1779. Nonetheless, his previous service in the French and Indian War meant he remained popular in New England. Amherst is also infamous for recommending, in a letter to a subordinate, the use of smallpox-covered blankets in warfare against the Native Americans along with any "other method that can serve to Extirpate this Execrable Race". For this reason, there have been occasional ad hoc movements to rename the town.

Amherst celebrated its 250th anniversary in 2009. The Amherst 250th Anniversary Celebration Committee and Amherst Historical Society organized events, including a book published by the Historical Society and written by Elizabeth M. Sharpe, Amherst A to Z.

In 2021 the City Council voted to establish the Amherst African Heritage Reparation Assembly to study reparations for the town's black residents. In 2022, at the Assembly's suggestion, the City Council approved $2,000,000 of initial funding for reparations.

=== History of town government ===
The Town converted from an open town meeting to a representative town meeting form in 1938. In 1953, Amherst voters passed the "Town Manager Act", which established the office of a town manager and reduced a number of elected positions. In 1995, a charter commission was approved to study Amherst's government; the charter majority recommended a seven-person Council and a mayor, while also maintaining a reduced size representative Town Meeting (150). This proposal failed in two successive votes.

In 2001, the League of Women Voters Amherst made a number of recommendations that were adopted in 2001 in the form of a revised "Amherst Town Government Act". An effort shortly thereafter to amend the charter to eliminate the town meeting, and establish an elected mayor and a nine-member Town Council, was rejected by voters twice, first in spring 2003 by fourteen votes and again on March 29, 2005 by 252 votes.

In 2016, a charter commission was approved to study Amherst's government. A majority of commissioners proposed a charter that would establish a 13-member council with no mayor. This proposal was voted on the March 27, 2018 local ballot, and was passed by over 1,000 votes, a 58% majority. The new town council was sworn in on December 2, 2018.

== Geography ==
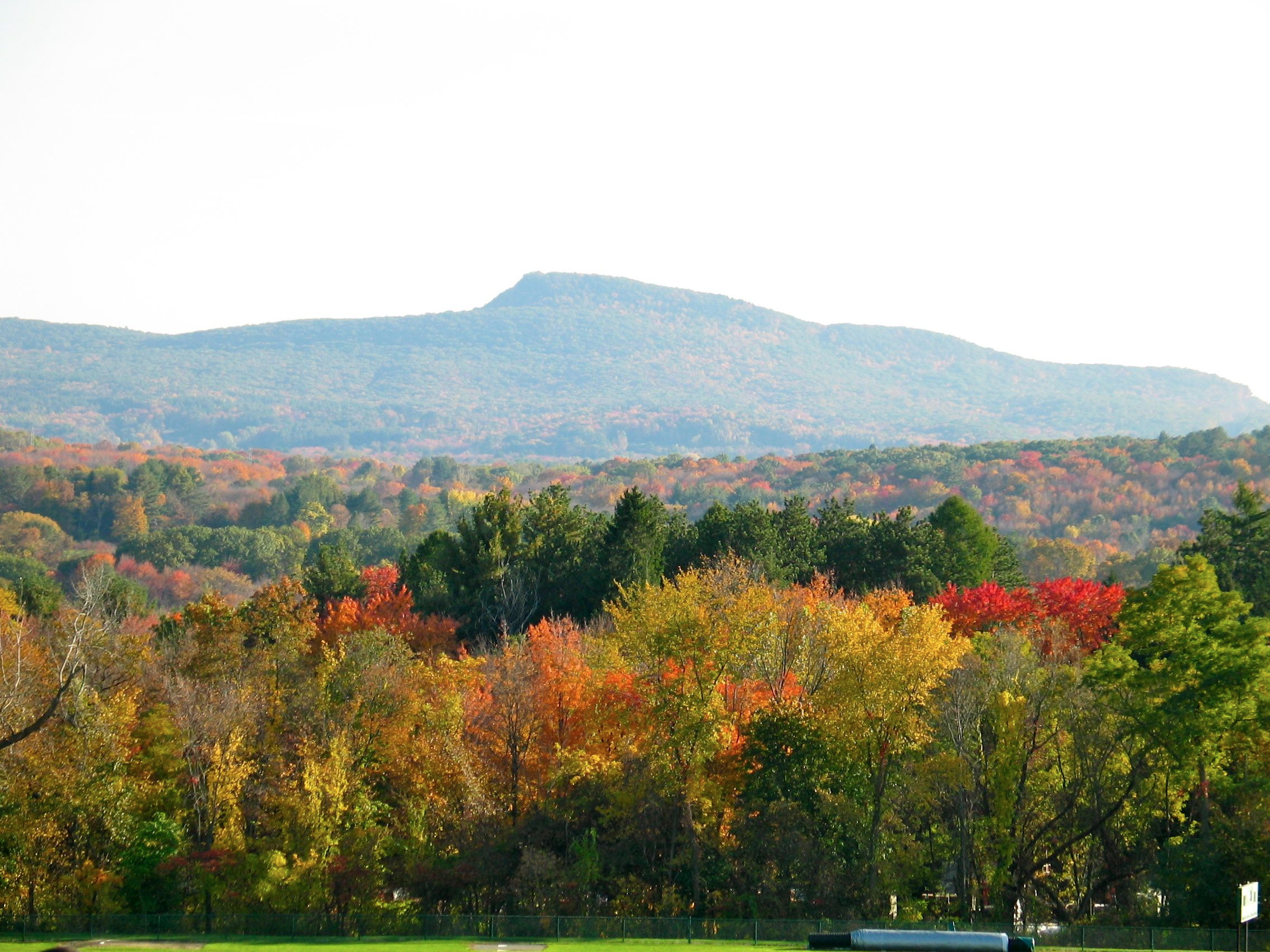
Mount Norwottuck

According to the United States Census Bureau, Amherst has a total area of 27.7 square miles (71.8 km^{2}), of which 27.6 square miles (71.5 km^{2}) are land and 0.12 square miles (0.3 km^{2}), or 0.48%, are water. The town is bordered by Hadley to the west, Sunderland and Leverett to the north, Shutesbury, Pelham, and Belchertown to the east, and Granby and South Hadley to the south. The highest point in the town is on the northern shoulder of Mount Norwottuck at the southern border of the town; the peak is in Granby but the town's high point is a few yards away and is about 1,100 feet (340 m). This point is located in the Mount Holyoke Range, which forms the so-called "Tofu Curtain". Amherst is nearly equidistant from Massachusetts' borders with Connecticut and Vermont.

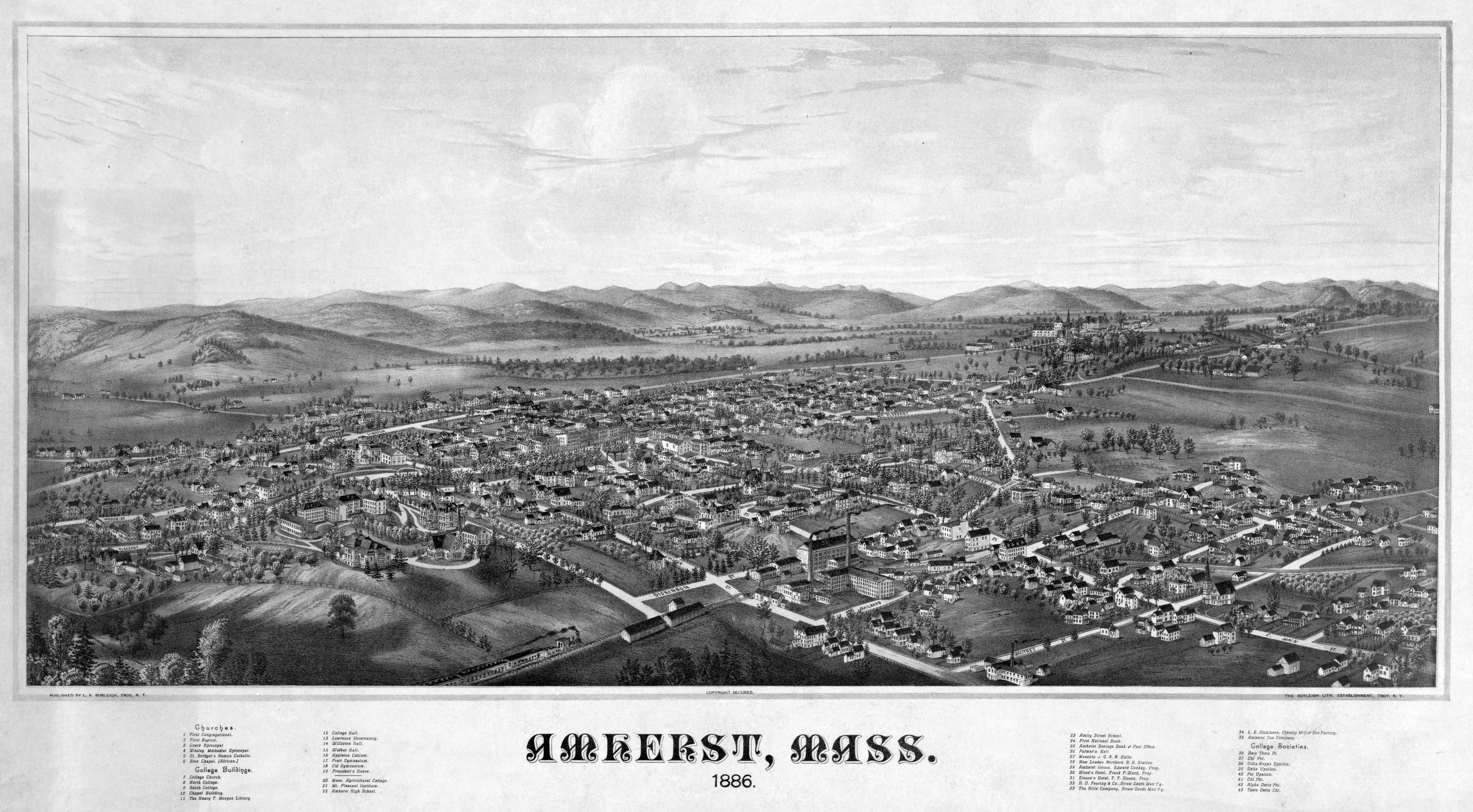
Listing of sights in Amherst, 1886

Amherst's ZIP Code of 01002 is the second-lowest number in the continental United States after Agawam (not counting codes used for specific government buildings such as the IRS).

=== Climate ===
Amherst has a marginal hot-summer humid continental climate (Köppen: Dfa), with July means hovering around 71.7 °F (22.1 °C). Winters are cold and snowy, although daytime temperatures often remain above freezing. Under the 2012 USDA Plant Hardiness Zone system, Amherst (ZIP Code 01002) is in zone 5b; however, Amherst closely borders zone 6a, which penetrates into Massachusetts in the Connecticut River Valley, and climate change may be shifting those zones.

Climate data for Amherst, Massachusetts, 1991–2020 normals, extremes 1893–present
Month	Jan	Feb	Mar	Apr	May	Jun	Jul	Aug	Sep	Oct	Nov	Dec	Year
Record high °F (°C)	70 (21)	78 (26)	85 (29)	93 (34)	98 (37)	101 (38)	104 (40)	100 (38)	99 (37)	90 (32)	82 (28)	72 (22)	104 (40)
Mean maximum °F (°C)	55.4 (13.0)	57.1 (13.9)	66.4 (19.1)	80.6 (27.0)	87.9 (31.1)	94.6 (34.8)	93.2 (34.0)	91.2 (32.9)	88.1 (31.2)	78.3 (25.7)	68.9 (20.5)	58.5 (14.7)	95.0 (35.0)
Mean daily maximum °F (°C)	34.0 (1.1)	37.0 (2.8)	45.2 (7.3)	58.2 (14.6)	69.5 (20.8)	78.0 (25.6)	83.1 (28.4)	81.5 (27.5)	74.4 (23.6)	64.9 (18.3)	49.7 (9.8)	39.2 (4.0)	59.6 (15.3)
Daily mean °F (°C)	23.9 (−4.5)	26.2 (−3.2)	34.7 (1.5)	46.3 (7.9)	57.5 (14.2)	66.5 (19.2)	71.7 (22.1)	69.9 (21.1)	62.3 (16.8)	50.2 (10.1)	39.4 (4.1)	30.0 (−1.1)	48.2 (9.0)
Mean daily minimum °F (°C)	13.8 (−10.1)	15.3 (−9.3)	24.1 (−4.4)	34.4 (1.3)	45.4 (7.4)	55.0 (12.8)	60.2 (15.7)	58.3 (14.6)	50.3 (10.2)	38.6 (3.7)	29.1 (−1.6)	20.8 (−6.2)	37.1 (2.8)
Mean minimum °F (°C)	−5.7 (−20.9)	−2.6 (−19.2)	6.5 (−14.2)	22.3 (−5.4)	30.3 (−0.9)	40.5 (4.7)	49.5 (9.7)	46.0 (7.8)	35.5 (1.9)	24.7 (−4.1)	14.5 (−9.7)	3.4 (−15.9)	−8.4 (−22.4)
Record low °F (°C)	−30 (−34)	−27 (−33)	−17 (−27)	8 (−13)	24 (−4)	29 (−2)	39 (4)	32 (0)	25 (−4)	12 (−11)	−4 (−20)	−22 (−30)	−30 (−34)
Average precipitation inches (mm)	3.36 (85)	2.93 (74)	3.47 (88)	3.79 (96)	3.71 (94)	4.46 (113)	4.12 (105)	4.12 (105)	4.62 (117)	4.74 (120)	3.38 (86)	3.89 (99)	46.59 (1,182)
Average snowfall inches (cm)	8.1 (21)	11.0 (28)	7.3 (19)	1.0 (2.5)	0.0 (0.0)	0.0 (0.0)	0.0 (0.0)	0.0 (0.0)	0.0 (0.0)	0.0 (0.0)	1.6 (4.1)	7.5 (19)	36.5 (93.6)
Average extreme snow depth inches (cm)	7.3 (19)	8.9 (23)	7.0 (18)	0.9 (2.3)	0.0 (0.0)	0.0 (0.0)	0.0 (0.0)	0.0 (0.0)	0.0 (0.0)	0.3 (0.76)	1.2 (3.0)	5.7 (14)	11.8 (30)
Average precipitation days (≥ 0.01 in)	10.8	9.2	9.5	11.1	12.6	11.3	11.0	10.0	8.9	10.8	9.5	10.6	125.3
Average snowy days (≥ 0.1 in)	5.6	5.0	3.1	0.6	0.0	0.0	0.0	0.0	0.0	0.1	0.9	3.7	19.0
Source 1: NOAA
Source 2: National Weather Service

== Demographics ==
Historical population
Year	Pop.	±%
1790	1,233	—
1800	1,258	+2.0%
1810	1,469	+16.8%
1820	1,917	+30.5%
1830	2,631	+37.2%
1840	2,550	−3.1%
1850	3,057	+19.9%
1860	3,206	+4.9%
1870	4,035	+25.9%
1880	4,298	+6.5%
1890	4,512	+5.0%
1900	5,028	+11.4%
1910	5,112	+1.7%
1920	5,550	+8.6%
1930	5,883	+6.0%
1940	6,410	+9.0%
1950	10,856	+69.4%
1960	13,718	+26.4%
1970	26,331	+91.9%
1980	33,229	+26.2%
1990	35,228	+6.0%
2000	34,874	−1.0%
2010	37,819	+8.4%
2020	39,263	+3.8%
2025*	40,920	+4.2%
* = population estimate. Source: United States census records and Population Estimates Program data.

=== 2020 U.S. Census ===
As of the 2020 U.S. census, there were 39,263 people, 9,700 households, and 4,124 families residing in the town. There were 9,711 housing units. The racial makeup of the town was 66.6% White, 5.1% Black or African American, 0.3% Native American, 14.4% Asian, 2.2% some other race, and 11.4% from two or more races. 9% of the population were Hispanic or Latino of any race.

Of the 9,700 households in the town, 17.4% had children under the age of 18 living with them, 34.4% were headed by married couples living together, 2.5% had a male householder with no spouse present, 5.6% had a female householder with no spouse present, and 57.5% were non-families. Of all households, 35.8% were made up of individuals, and 11.3% were someone living alone who was 65 years of age or older. The average household size was 2.21 and the average family size was 2.87.

In the town, 5.1% of the population were aged 14 and younger, 61.6% were from 15 to 24, 12.4% were from 25 to 44, 10.6% were from 45 to 64, and 10.2% were 65 years of age or older. The median age was 21.4 years. For every 100 females, there were 95.8 males. For every 100 females age 18 and over, there were 94.1 males.

The estimated median annual income for a household in the town was $66,968, and the median income for a family was $150,061.About 7.6% of families and 23.7% of the population were below the poverty line, including 17.4% of those under age 18 and 4.2% of those age 65 or over.

Of residents 25 years old or older, 53.0% have a graduate or professional degree, 22.6% have a bachelor's degree and only 3.1% did not graduate from high school. The largest industry is education, health, and social services, in which 50.6% of employed persons work.

=== 2010 U.S. Census ===
As of the 2010 U.S. census, there were 37,819 people, 9,259 households, and 4,484 families residing in the town. There were 9,711 housing units. The racial makeup of the town was 76.9% White, 5.4% Black or African American, 0.2% Native American, 10.9% Asian, 0.03% Pacific Islander, 2.4% some other race, and 4.1% from two or more races. 7.3% of the population were Hispanic or Latino of any race.

Of the 9,259 households in the town, 23.4% had children under the age of 18 living with them, 35.6% were headed by married couples living together, 16.3% had a female householder with no husband present, and 51.6% were non-families. Of all households, 27.3% were made up of individuals, and 9.7% were someone living alone who was 65 years of age or older. The average household size was 2.44 and the average family size was 2.88.

In the town, 10.0% of the population were under the age of 18, 55.7% were from 18 to 24, 13.3% were from 25 to 44, 13.6% were from 45 to 64, and 7.4% were 65 years of age or older. The median age was 21.6 years. For every 100 females, there were 95.8 males. For every 100 females age 18 and over, there were 94.7 males.

For the period 2011–2015, the estimated median annual income for a household in the town was $48,059, and the median income for a family was $96,005. Male full-time workers had a median income of $64,750 versus $39,278 for females. The per capita income for the town was $18,905. About 8.7% of families and 34.7% of the population were below the poverty line, including 18.2% of those under age 18 and 4.5% of those age 65 or over.

Of residents 25 years old or older, 41.7% have a graduate or professional degree, and only 4.9% did not graduate from high school. The largest industry is education, health, and social services, in which 51.9% of employed persons work.

These statistics given above include some but not all of the large student population, roughly 30,000 in 2010, many of whom only reside in the town part of the year. Amherst is home to thousands of part-time and full-time residents associated with the University of Massachusetts Amherst, Amherst College, and Hampshire College.

=== Income ===
Data is from the 2009–2013 American Community Survey 5-Year Estimates.

Rank	ZIP Code (ZCTA)	Per capita income	Median household income	Median family income	Population	Number of households
	Massachusetts	$35,763	$66,866	$84,900	6,605,058	2,530,147
	Hampshire County	$29,460	$61,227	$81,385	159,267	58,828
	United States	$28,155	$53,046	$64,719	311,536,594	115,610,216
1	01002	$27,691	$54,422	$96,929	29,266	9,248
	Amherst	$19,796	$53,191	$96,733	38,651	8,583
2	01003 (UMass Amherst Campus)	$3,531	$N/A	$N/A	11,032	16

== Economy ==
Major employers in Amherst include University of Massachusetts Amherst, Amherst College, William D. Mullins Memorial Center, Hampshire College, and Amherst-Pelham Regional School District.

== Arts and culture ==
=== Points of interest ===
- Amherst Center Cultural District, formed in 2016.
- Amherst Area Chamber of Commerce
- Amherst Cinema Arts Center: a local non-profit theater showing mostly arthouse and independent films
- Amherst History Museum, which opened in 1916 and is governed by the Amherst Historical Society
- Beneski Museum of Natural History, including the Hitchcock Ichnological Cabinet
- Emily Dickinson Museum, birthplace and lifelong residence of poet Emily Dickinson, now a museum.
- Eric Carle Museum of Picture Book Art
- Hitchcock Center for the Environment, an environmental education center on the grounds of Hampshire College
- Jones Library
- Mead Art Museum at Amherst College: 18,000 items with a particular strength in American art
- Norwottuck Branch of the Mass Central Rail Trail, which runs through Northampton, Hadley, Amherst, and Belchertown, with planned future integration into the Mass Central Rail Trail to Boston.
- W. E. B. Du Bois Library at the University of Massachusetts Amherst: the tallest academic library in the United States

== Sports ==
- Games were played in town during the 1996 World Junior Ice Hockey Championships.
- Amherst Regional High School's 1992–93 girls' basketball team inspired the book In These Girls, Hope is a Muscle by Madeleine Blais.
- The University of Massachusetts Amherst's Ultimate Frisbee Team was ranked first in the Division 1 Men's Ultimate league for the 2017 season.
- The Amherst Invitational, founded in 1992, is the oldest high school Ultimate Frisbee tournament in the United States.

== Government ==
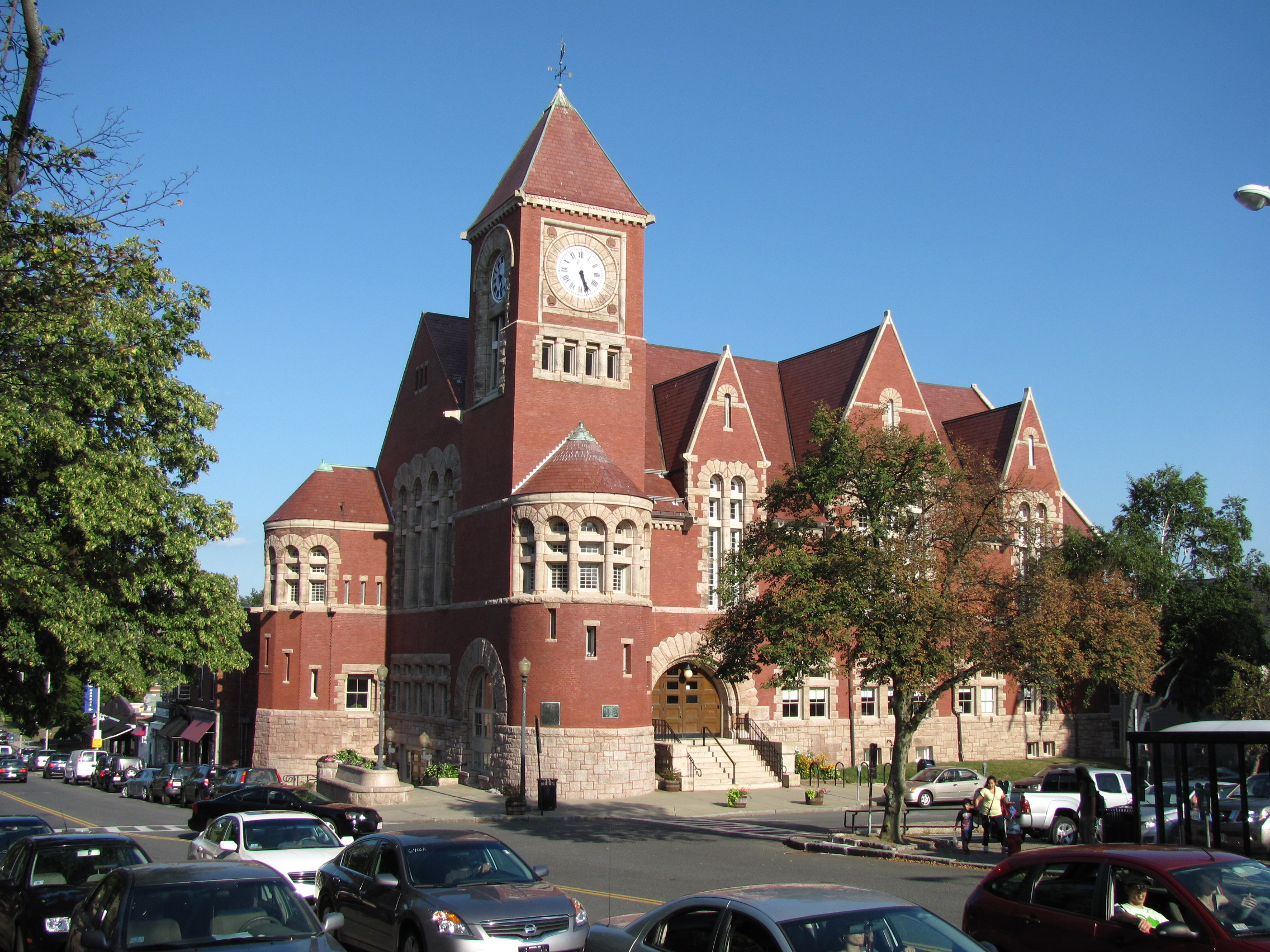
Town Hall

Amherst has a town council for its legislative branch and a town manager for its executive branch. The town manager is appointed by the town council.

Amherst's town council consists of ten district councilors and three councilors-at-large. Two district councilors are elected from each of five districts in Amherst. The three councilors-at-large are elected by the whole town. Each councilor serves a two-year term, except for the first council, where each member will serve a three-year term.

Amherst also has the following elected bodies:

- A five-member School Committee with two-year terms.
- A six-member library board of trustees with two-year terms.
- A single Oliver Smith Will Elector with a two-year term.

Amherst also has a five-member housing authority in which three of the five members are elected by voters. Each member serves a two-year term.

Town Council Members
Title	Name	District	First elected
Councilor-at-Large	Mandi Jo Hanneke	At-Large	2018
Councilor-at-Large	Ellisha Walker	At-Large	2021
Councilor-at-Large	Andrew Steinberg	At-Large	2018
District Councilor	Michele Miller	1	2021
District Councilor	Cathy Schoen	1	2018
District Councilor	Lynn Griesemer	2	2018
District Councilor	Patricia De Angelis	2	2018
District Councilor	Dorothy Pam	3	2018
District Councilor	Jennifer Taub	3	2021
District Councilor	Anika Lopes	4	2021
District Councilor	Pam Rooney	4	2021
District Councilor	Shalini Bahl-Milne	5	2018
District Councilor	Ana Devlin Gauthier	5	2021

=== State and federal representation ===
In the Massachusetts Senate Amherst is in the "Hampshire, Franklin and Worcester" district, represented by Democratic State Senator Jo Comerford since January 2019. In the Massachusetts House of Representatives Amherst is in the 3rd Hampshire district, represented by Democratic State Representative Mindy Domb since January 2019. Amherst is part of the Eighth Massachusetts Governor's Council district and has been represented by Tara Jacobs since January 2023.

Amherst is represented at the federal level by an all-Democratic delegation, including Senators Elizabeth Warren and Ed Markey, and by Representative Jim McGovern of the Second Congressional District of Massachusetts.

=== Voter registration ===
Voter turnout versus voter registration over time.

Voter registration data is from the state election enrollment statistics.

Registered Voters and Party Enrollment
Year	Democratic		Republican		Unenrolled		Total
2004	8,522	47.8%	1,231	6.9%	7,623	42.8%	17,816
2006	8,350	49.2%	1,076	6.3%	7,228	42.6%	16,980
2008	9,343	49.3%	1,076	5.7%	8,257	43.6%	18,956
2010	8,675	49.6%	948	5.4%	7,661	43.8%	17,501
2012	10,324	46%	1,219	5.4%	10,665	47.6%	22,425
2014	9,645	45%	1,156	5.4%	10,454	48.8%	21,431
2016	10,414	46.9%	1,146	5.2%	10,202	46%	22,196
2018	10,249	46.6%	1,025	4.7%	10,331	47%	21,993
2020	8,562	51.7%	575	3.5%	7,166	43.3%	16,551
2022	7,222	51%	414	3%	6,441	45%	14,243

=== Politics ===
Like many college towns, Amherst leans heavily Democratic. In each of the presidential elections from 2012 to 2020, more than 80% of Amherst's votes went to the Democratic candidate. The last Republican to win Amherst on the Presidential level was Richard Nixon in 1960.

In the 2020 United States presidential election, Democrat Joe Biden received 90.3 percent of the vote to incumbent Republican Donald Trump's 7.4 percent. In the 2000 United States presidential election, Amherst was one of a small number of places that delivered more votes for Green Party candidate Ralph Nader (who took 24% of the vote) than Republican candidate George W. Bush, who received just 13%.

== Education ==
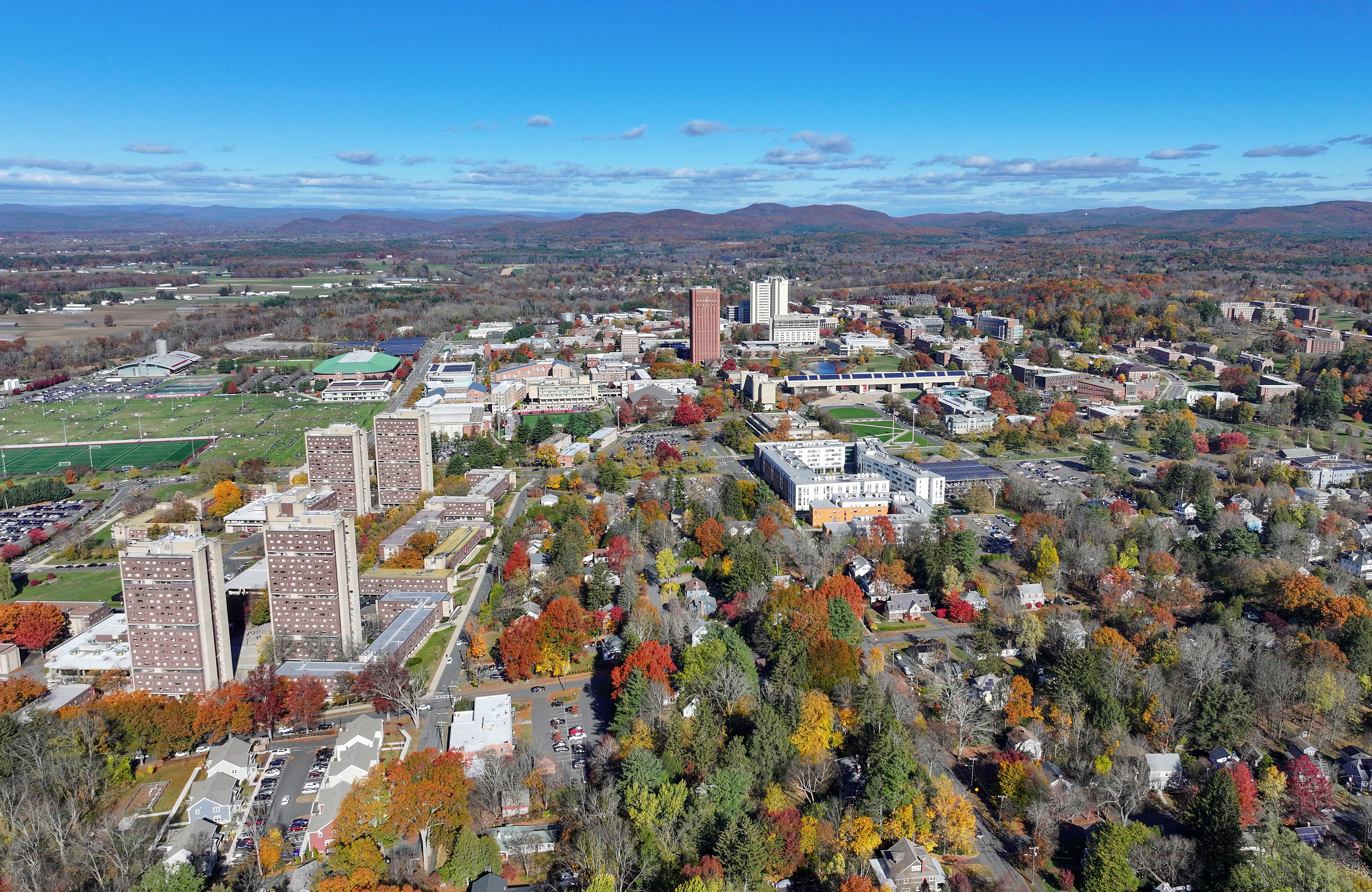
Aerial view of University of Massachusetts Amherst

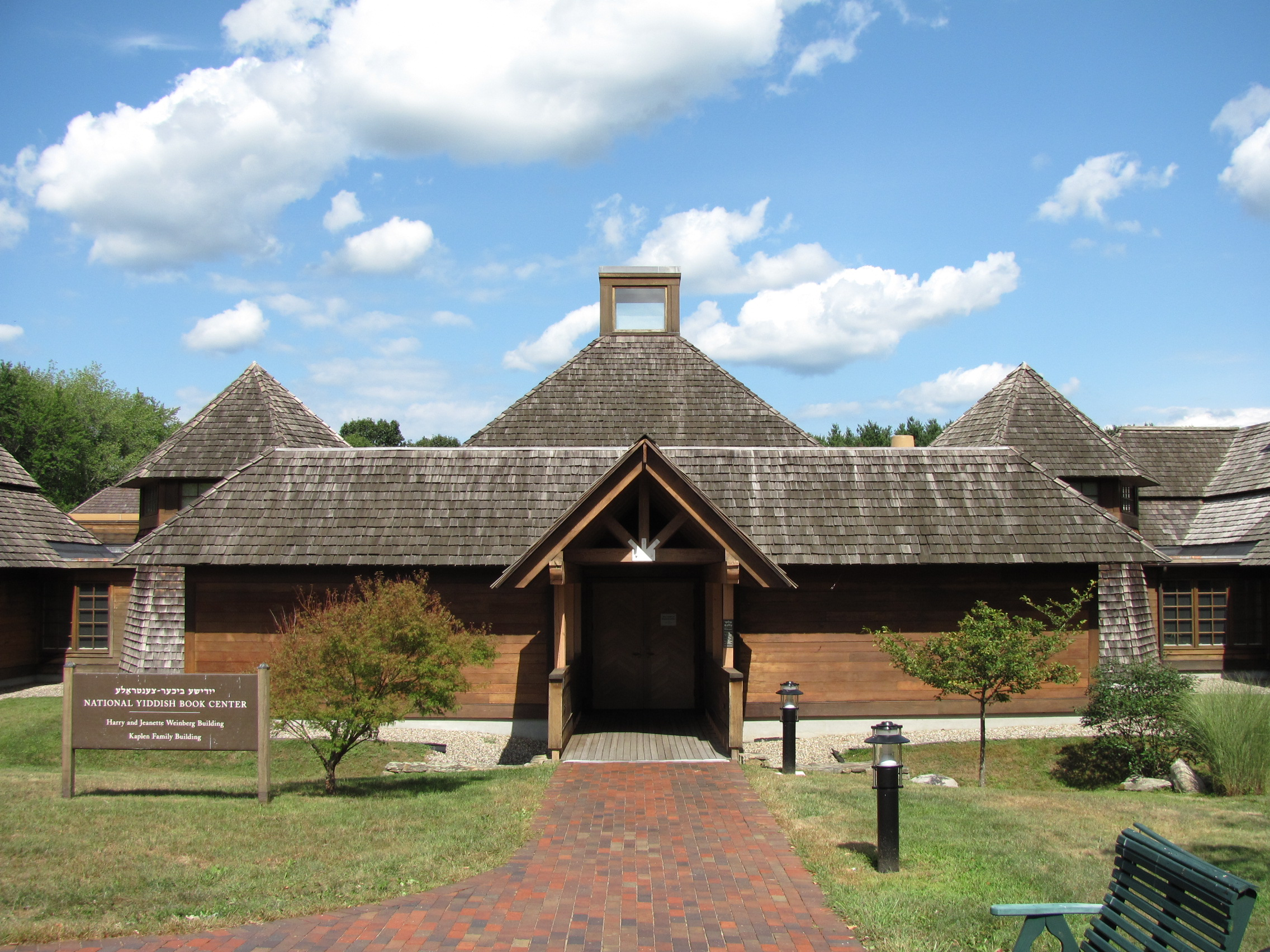
The Yiddish Book Center, located on the campus of Hampshire College

The town is part of the Amherst Regional School District along with Leverett, Pelham, and Shutesbury. Amherst has three elementary schools: Crocker Farm Elementary School, Fort River Elementary School, and Wildwood Elementary School serving K–6. Students in Amherst then attend Amherst Regional Middle School for grades 7–8. High school students then attend Amherst Regional High School.

There are three tertiary institutions located in the town: the public University of Massachusetts Amherst (the flagship of the UMass system), and two private liberal arts colleges—Amherst College and Hampshire College.

== Infrastructure ==
=== Transportation ===
==== Bus ====
The Pioneer Valley Transit Authority, funded by local governments and the Five College Consortium, provides public transportation in the area, operated by University of Massachusetts Transportation Services. Service runs well into the early morning hours on weekends when school is in session. Students attending any colleges in the Five Colleges Consortium have a fee included in their tuition bills (service fee for UMass Amherst students and student activity fees for the other colleges) for each semester that prepays their bus fares for the semester. UMass Transit buses operate via a proof-of-payment system, in which there are random inspections of student identification cards and bus passes and transfers.

Peter Pan Bus Lines provides service between Amherst and Springfield, Boston, and other locations in New England. Megabus provides service between New York City, Amherst, and Burlington, Vermont.

==== Rail ====
Amtrak rail service is available in nearby Northampton on the Vermonter service between Washington, D.C., and St. Albans, Vermont. More frequent Amtrak service to New York City and Washington, D.C., is available from Union Station in Springfield.

==== Airports ====
The closest major domestic and limited international air service is available through Bradley International Airport (BDL) in Windsor Locks, Connecticut. Bradley is located approximately one hour's driving time from Amherst. Major international service is available through Logan International Airport (BOS) in Boston, 90 miles (140 km) away.

General aviation service is close by, at Northampton Airport, Westover Metropolitan Airport, and Turners Falls Airport.

== Police report ==
Since 1997, the local newspaper, the Amherst Bulletin, has published a weekly log of phone calls received by the Amherst Police Department. This police report, whose tone is deadpan and often unintentionally humorous, has been the subject of at least two books and a 2002 article in Harper's Magazine, "Gone When Police Got There". For example, an entry from the March 27, 2015 police report reads: "2:48 a.m.—An Ann Whalen Apartments resident awoke to find someone on her balcony looking into her bedroom. The woman later told police she thinks she may have been dreaming prior to calling 911."

== Notable people ==
=== Historical ===
- Chinua Achebe (1930–2013), was a professor at the University of Massachusetts from 1972 to 1976
- Osmyn Baker (1800–1875), born in Amherst, United States Congressman and lawyer
- Ray Stannard Baker (1870–1946), newspaperman, biographer of Woodrow Wilson
- William S. Clark (1825–1886), Academician, politician, businessman; principal founder of the Massachusetts Agricultural College (now the University of Massachusetts Amherst), founder of the Sapporo Agricultural College (now the Hokkaido University)
- Mason Cook Darling (1801–1866), born in Amherst, United States Congressman from Wisconsin and first mayor of Fond du Lac, Wisconsin
- Melvil Dewey (1851–1931), devised the Dewey Decimal System while an assistant librarian at Amherst College in 1876
- Edward Dickinson (1803–1874), born in Amherst, lawyer, United States Congressman, and father of Emily Dickinson
- Emily Dickinson (1830–1886), born and lived in Amherst, one of the most prominent and celebrated American poets
- Eugene Field (1850–1895), raised in Amherst by cousin, Mary Field French; poet and humorist who wrote children's poem Wynken, Blynken, and Nod
- Robert Francis (1901–1987), poet
- Robert Frost (1874–1963), Pulitzer Prize–winning poet who taught at Amherst College and retired there
- Howard Roger Garis (1873–1962), children's author who wrote the Uncle Wiggily book series
- Lilian Garis (1873–1954), author of juvenile fiction who under the pseudonym Laura Lee Hope wrote early volumes in the Bobbsey Twins series
- Edward Hitchcock (1793–1864), educator, early geologist and a founder of the science of ichnology
- Helen Hunt Jackson (1830–1885), born in Amherst, noted author best known for A Century of Dishonor and her novel Ramona
- Arthur Lithgow (1915–2004), lived and died in Amherst, noted actor, producer and director of Shakespeare plays, founder of the Great Lakes Shakespeare Festival in Ohio (today known as the Great Lakes Theatre Festival), former director of the McCarter Theatre in Princeton, NJ, father of actor John Lithgow
- Ebenezer Mattoon (1755–1843), born in North Amherst, lieutenant in Continental Army during American Revolution, US congressman (1801–1803).
- Paul Nitze (1907–2004), born in Amherst, diplomat who helped shape defense policy over numerous presidential administrations
- Julius Hawley Seelye (1824–1895), Amherst College professor, United States Representative (1875–1877), fifth president of Amherst College
- Harlan Fiske Stone (1872–1946), attended public schools in Amherst and Amherst College; dean of the Columbia Law School, 52nd Attorney General of the United States, and Chief Justice of the United States
- Mabel Loomis Todd (1856–1932), world traveler, edited and published the first volume of Emily Dickinson's poetry
- Noah Webster (1758–1843), author of An American Dictionary of the English Language

=== Born or raised in Amherst ===
- Annie Baker, playwright
- Thomas Bezucha, film & television director, writer, & producer
- Emily Dickinson (1830–1886), poet
- P. D. Eastman, children's author, illustrator, and screenwriter
- Helen Palmer Geisel, children's author and first wife of Dr. Seuss
- Michael Hixon, U.S. Olympic Athlete Rio 2016, men's individual 3 meter springboard; 3 meter springboard synchro
- James D. Hornfischer, military historian and author
- James Ihedigbo, Detroit Lions defensive back
- Martin Johnson, of rock band Boys like Girls
- John Leonard, ice hockey player
- Ryan Leonard, ice hockey player
- Michael E. Mann (born 1965), climatologist
- J Mascis, singer, guitarist and songwriter for alternative rock band Dinosaur Jr.
- Eric Mabius, star of ABC show Ugly Betty, attended Amherst schools
- Makaya McCraven, musician
- Julie McNiven, actress with recurring roles on Mad Men and Supernatural
- Ilan Mitchell-Smith, actor starring in 1985 film Weird Science, attended Amherst public schools
- Ebon Moss-Bachrach, actor with roles on The Bear and Girls, raised in Amherst and attended Amherst public schools
- Henry Addison Nelson (1820–1906), Presbyterian clergyman
- Margaret Morse Nice (1883–1974), ornithologist, ethologist
- Eli Noyes, animator, film producer, director
- Gil Penchina, Former CEO of Wikia, Inc., attended the University of Massachusetts Amherst
- John Pettes, US Marshal for Vermont, born in Amherst
- Steve Porter, music producer
- Allen St. Pierre, executive director of NORML, attended public schools in Amherst and graduated from the University of Massachusetts Amherst
- Matt Reid, head baseball coach at Army
- Uma Thurman, Oscar-nominated actress, whose father, Robert Thurman, taught at Amherst College
- Martin M. Wattenberg (born 1970), artist and computer scientist
- Zoe Weizenbaum, child actress
- Jamila Wideman (born 1975), female left-handed point guard basketball player, lawyer and activist
- Elisha Yaffe, comedian, actor, and producer
- Kevin Ziomek, American professional baseball pitcher in the Detroit Tigers organization

=== Live/lived in Amherst ===
- Gavin Andresen, Bitcoin Foundation founder and former Bitcoin contributor
- Christian Appy, author of Patriots and Working-Class War, professor at University of Massachusetts Amherst
- Christopher Benfey, author of The Great Wave, professor at Mount Holyoke College
- Holly Black, author of Tithe, Valiant, Ironside, and co-author of the Spiderwick Chronicles
- Augusten Burroughs, author of Running with Scissors
- Michelle Chamuel, singer, songwriter, producer
- Cassandra Clare, author of The Mortal Instruments and The Infernal Devices
- Arda Collins, poet and winner of the Yale Series of Younger Poets Competition
- Tony DiTerlizzi, author of The Spider and the Fly and co-author/illustrator for Spiderwick Chronicles
- Peter Elbow, compositionist and professor emeritus at the University of Massachusetts Amherst
- Joseph Ellis, historian and author of Founding Brothers
- Martín Espada, poet, professor at the University of Massachusetts and author of the 2006 The Republic of Poetry, among others
- Black Francis, singer/guitarist of the alternative rock band the Pixies, attended UMass Amherst
- Rebecca Guay, artist specializing in watercolor painting and illustration
- Norton Juster, author of The Phantom Tollbooth
- John Katzenbach, author of The Madman's Tale
- Julius Lester, author and professor at the University of Massachusetts Amherst
- Michael Lesy, author of Wisconsin Death Trip, professor at Hampshire College
- Cale Makar, professional ice hockey player for the Colorado Avalanche and former University of Massachusetts defenseman.
- Charles C. Mann (born 1955), journalist and author of 1491: New Revelations of the Americas Before Columbus and 1493: Uncovering the New World Columbus Created
- Lynn Margulis (1938–2011), evolutionary biologist
- Catherine Newman, memoirist and novelist
- John Olver, politician who served in the US House of Representatives
- John Elder Robison, author of Look Me in the Eye; older brother of Augusten Burroughs
- Andrew Salkey, author, poet, broadcaster and professor at Hampshire College
- Jason Salkey, actor in British TV show Sharpe, student at Amherst High School and Hampshire College
- Joey Santiago, lead guitarist of the alternative rock band the Pixies, attended UMass Amherst
- Archie Shepp, jazz musician and professor emeritus at the University of Massachusetts Amherst
- Chris Smither, folk/blues singer, guitarist, and songwriter
- James Tate (born 1943), poet and professor at the University of Massachusetts Amherst
- Carl Vigeland, author of In Concert and many other books
- John Edgar Wideman, novelist and writer
- Dara Wier, poet and professor in the MFA Program for Poets & Writers at the University of Massachusetts Amherst
- Roman Yakub, composer

== Sister cities ==
- Kanegasaki, Japan
- La Paz Centro, Nicaragua
- Nyeri, Kenya

== See also ==
- Amherst Regional High School
- Amherst-Pelham Regional School District
- Tofu Curtain
