= James R. Nolen =

Massachusetts politician (1933–2011)

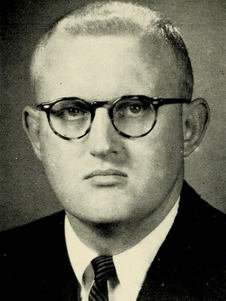

Member of the Massachusetts House of Representatives from the 3rd Hampshire district
- In office 1959–1978

Personal details
- Born: April 17, 1933 Holyoke, Massachusetts
- Died: September 21, 2011 (aged 78) Springfield, Massachusetts
- Education: Harvard College (BA); Columbia Business School (MS); Portia Law School (LLB)

James R. Nolen (April 17, 1933– September 21, 2011) was an American politician who was the member of the Massachusetts House of Representatives from the 3rd Hampshire district.
