= Carl Vigeland =

American writer and publisher

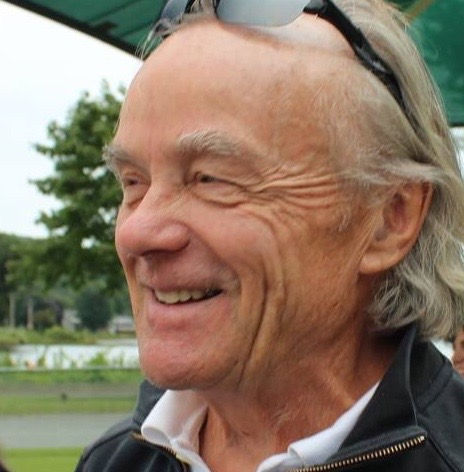

Carl Vigeland is an American writer and publisher who lives in Amherst, Massachusetts.

== Biography ==
The son of musicians, Vigeland was born in Englewood, NJ, and spent his childhood in Buffalo, NY. He graduated from Harvard University cum laude (majoring in government) and later earned a master's degree in education from University of Massachusetts Amherst. He lived many years in Conway, MA, before moving to Amherst, MA where he and his family have resided since 1991. He is the brother of composer and pianist Nils Vigeland.

Vigeland began his writing career as a newspaper reporter and reviewer while freelancing for magazines. Vigeland worked at Amherst College from 1978 to 1983, writing and editing several of the school's publications, before leaving to write about the oldest corporation in America, Harvard University. His first book, Great Good Fortune: How Harvard Makes Its Money, was published by Houghton Mifflin Company in 1986.

An amateur pianist and trumpet player, and an expert skier and golfer, Vigeland has written on wide-ranging topics for such magazines as The Atlantic Monthly, Harper's, The New Yorker, Boston Magazine, The Boston Globe Magazine, Conde Nast Traveler, Country Journal, DoubleTake, Downbeat, Fast Company, Golf Digest, Harvard, New England Monthly, The New York Times Magazine, Playboy, Sports Illustrated, and Yankee.

His second book, In Concert: Onstage and Offstage with the Boston Symphony Orchestra was published by William Morrow and Company in 1989. The book chronicles music director Seiji Ozawa, trumpeter Charlie Schlueter and the entire BSO throughout the 1986–1987 season. Publishers Weekly lauded the book for "demystifying and humanizing the august Boston Symphony Orchestra" and noted that "Vigeland is at his best in conveying the emotive power of music, making palpable the feelings of the musicians when a concert goes well and they are overwhelmed at the sound they have made."

Vigeland taught writing for many years at the University of Massachusetts Amherst. He was instrumental in developing courses at UMass for its award-winning Certificate in Online Journalism. He also taught journalism at Greenfield Community College, where for several years he was president of the executive committee of the Friends of the Archibald MacLeish Collection.

In 1994, W.W. Norton and Company published Vigeland's Stalking the Shark: Pressure & Passion on the Pro Golf Tour. Focusing on Greg Norman, the book explores what really separates the great golfers from the rest of the field.

In 2001, after a decade on the road with the jazz trumpeter Wynton Marsalis, he collaborated with Marsalis on Jazz in the Bittersweet Blues of Life, journaling life on the road, in the recording studio, and in concerts with Marsalis, his ensemble, and road crew in the early 1990s. Library Journal recommended the book, saying "This period saw Marsalis, currently director of Jazz at Lincoln Center, honing his chops at little clubs and composing songs. While not a traditional biography, this book provides a very real, personal glimpse of Marsalis, as both musician and man. Trumpeter and music writer Vigeland, who tagged along with the septet, here allows his coauthor's sense of humor to shine through. The book's film-inspired techniques make for an unpredictable, ever-evolving reading experience, and readers will come away with a feeling for life on the road, stripped of its many false stereotypes."

The next year, Vigeland returned to the subject of golf, collaborating with Bob Duval on Letters to a Young Golfer, published by Basic Books as part of their "The Art of Mentoring" series.

In 2009, Wiley published Vigeland's Mostly Mozart Guide to Mozart, a concise biography accompanied by insights into Mozart's most important works in a variety of genres.

Vigeland's seventh book is The Breathless Present, published by Levellers Press in 2011. Both an autobiography and a road book, in The Breathless Present Vigeland shares portraits of an unusual grouping of people, ranging from an early mentor and one-time neighbor, the late poet Archibald MacLeish, to jazz great Wynton Marsalis, and the author's charismatic father, also a musician. The work tells several intersecting stories in a variety of voices that mirror music's power to transmute memory and affirm life.

Vigeland's latest books are Trumpet Voluntaries, Holy Ground, Symmetry, Walking Trane, and Ricochet. Other recent books are Jonathan's Sternberg, a biography of conductor and teacher Jonathan Sternberg, published in 2014, The Great Romance: The Sun Returns, Time Never, published in 2015, A Symphony for Shelbie and Dear President Trump: An Open Letter on Greatness, both published in 2019, and, with Archibald MacLeish, October Calf [2020].

In 2019, Vigeland began publishing books under the imprint, Combray House Books.

== Bibliography ==
- Vigeland, Carl (1986) Great Good Fortune: How Harvard Makes Its Money. Houghton Mifflin; (2021) Combray House
- Vigeland, Carl (1989) In Concert: Onstage and Offstage with the Boston Symphony Orchestra. Morrow, 1989
- Vigeland, Carl (1996) Stalking the Shark: Pressure & Passion on the Pro Golf Tour. Norton, 1994
- Vigeland, Carl and Marsalis, Wynton (2001) Jazz in the Bittersweet Blues of Life, DaCapo Press, 2001
- Vigeland, Carl (2002) Letters to a Young Golfer (with Bob Duval). Basic Books, 2002
- Vigeland, Carl (2009) The Mostly Mozart Guide to Mozart. Wiley, 2009
- Vigeland, Carl (2011) The Breathless Present. Levellers Press
- Vigeland, Carl (2014), Jonathan Sternberg. Tricorn, 2014
- Vigeland, Carl (2015), The Great Romance: The Sun Returns, Time Never. Levellers Press, 2015
- Vigeland, Carl (2019), A Symphony for Shelbie. Combray House, 2019
- Vigeland, Carl (2019), French Lessons (with Joseph C. French Jr.), Combray House, 2019
- Vigeland, Carl (2019), Dear President Trump: An Open Letter on Greatness. Combray House, 2019
- Vigeland, Carl and MacLeish, Archibald (2020), October Calf. Combray House, 2020
- Vigeland, Carl (2021), Ricochet. Combray House, 2021
- Vigeland, Carl (2021), Walking Trane, Combray House, 2021
- Vigeland, Carl (2022), Symmetry: Early Poems, Late Photographs. Combray House, 2022
