= Amherst African Heritage Reparation Assembly =

United States organization

The Amherst African Heritage Reparation Assembly was created by the Amherst, Massachusetts City Council in June 2021 to develop the town's reparations plan by Oct. 31, 2021. In 2021, the Amherst Town Council approved the creation of a reparations fund. A year later, the council voted to finance the fund through deposits from the city's certified tax cannabis revenue for the previous year. In June 2022, the City Council approved $2,000,000 of initial funding for reparations.

It was made up of six Black residents and one representative from the NGO Reparations for Amherst with the final Assembly consisting of; Heather Lord, Yvonne Mendez, Michele Miller, Alexis Reed, Irvin Rhodes, Amilcar Shabazz, and Debora Bridges.

The group was advised by Robin Rue Simmons, the architect of the Evanston Reparations Committee.

== See also ==
- Evanston Reparations Committee
- California Reparations Task Force
