= Catherine Newman =

American author (born 1968)

- Born: 1968 (age 57–58)
- Education: Amherst College; University of California, Santa Cruz (PhD)
- Occupation: Author
- Website: www.catherinenewmanwriter.com

Catherine Newman (born 1968) is an American author of books for children and adults.

== Biography ==
Newman attended Fieldston High School in the Bronx and graduated from Amherst College in 1990. Newman earned a Ph.D. in Literature from the University of California, Santa Cruz.

Newman has worked in hospice care. Her favorite book is Adrienne Rich's The Dream of a Common Language.

Newman lives in Amherst, Massachusetts. She is Jewish.

=== Writing career ===
Newman has written for Taste and The Washington Post.

Her memoir Waiting for Birdy: A Year of Frantic Tedium, Neurotic Angst, and the Wild Magic of Growing a Family (Penguin, 2005) received a starred review from Publishers Weekly, which called it "honest, tender and funny". Kirkus Reviews said, "what sustains the reader is the steady humor displayed in Newman's benignly wacko voice, crisp and always ready to deflate".

Kirkus called her second memoir, Catastrophic Happiness: Finding Joy in Childhood's Messy Years (Little, Brown & Co., 2016), "an overly sentimental book".

Her adult fiction debut was We All Want Impossible Things (Harper, 2022). It tells the story of two longtime friends as one of them is dying of ovarian cancer. Newman was inspired to write it following the 2015 death of a good friend. We All Want Impossible Things received a starred review from Kirkus Reviews that read, "Newman perfectly captures the beauty and burden of caring for someone in their final moments" and "a warm and remarkably funny book about death and caregiving that will make readers laugh through their tears". Publishers Weekly called it a "moving adult debut".

Newman's second novel, Sandwich, was published in 2024, again by Harper. The novel centers on a summer week that an extended family spends on Cape Cod. A New York Times review proclaimed that "if you want to laugh out loud, tear up and rush to pull out a book in the 35 seconds between subway stops, this sweet, savory, tenderhearted 'Sandwich' fits the bill."

Wreck (Harper, 2025), Newman's most recent novel, is a sequel to Sandwich. Its story retains Newman's focus on family dynamics, and revolves around the main character's obsession with a local accident. The book became a New York Times bestseller and received a starred review from Kirkus.

In addition to her works for adults, Newman has written several books for children that were published by Storey Publishing, including Stitch Camp: 18 Crafty Projects for Kids & Tweens (2017; cowritten with Nicole Blum), How to Be a Person: 65 Hugely Useful, Super-Important Skills to Learn before You're Grown Up (2020), What Can I Say? A Kid's Guide to Super-Useful Social Skills to Help You Get Along and Express Yourself: Speak Up, Speak Out, Talk about Hard Things, and Be a Good Friend (2022).

== Selected works ==
- Waiting for Birdy: A Year of Frantic Tedium, Neurotic Angst, and the Wild Magic of Growing a Family. Penguin Books, 2005.
- It's a Boy. (Contributor of "Pretty Baby".) Seal Press, 2006.
- Catastrophic Happiness: Finding Joy in Childhood's Messy Years. Little, Brown & Co., 2016.
- Stitch Camp: 18 Crafty Projects for Kids & Tweens. (By Nicole Blum and Catherine Newman.) Storey Publishing, 2017.
- How to Be a Person: 65 Hugely Useful, Super-Important Skills to Learn before You're Grown Up. Storey Publishing, 2020.
- What Can I Say? A Kid's Guide to Super-Useful Social Skills to Help You Get Along and Express Yourself: Speak Up, Speak Out, Talk about Hard Things, and Be a Good Friend. Storey Publishing, 2022.
- We All Want Impossible Things. Harper, 2022.
- Sandwich. Harper. 2024-06-18. ISBN 978-0-06-334516-4.
- Wreck. Harper. 2025. ISBN 978-0-06-345391-3.
