= Pelham Town Hall Historic District =

Historic district in Massachusetts, United States

- U.S. National Register of Historic Places
- U.S. Historic district
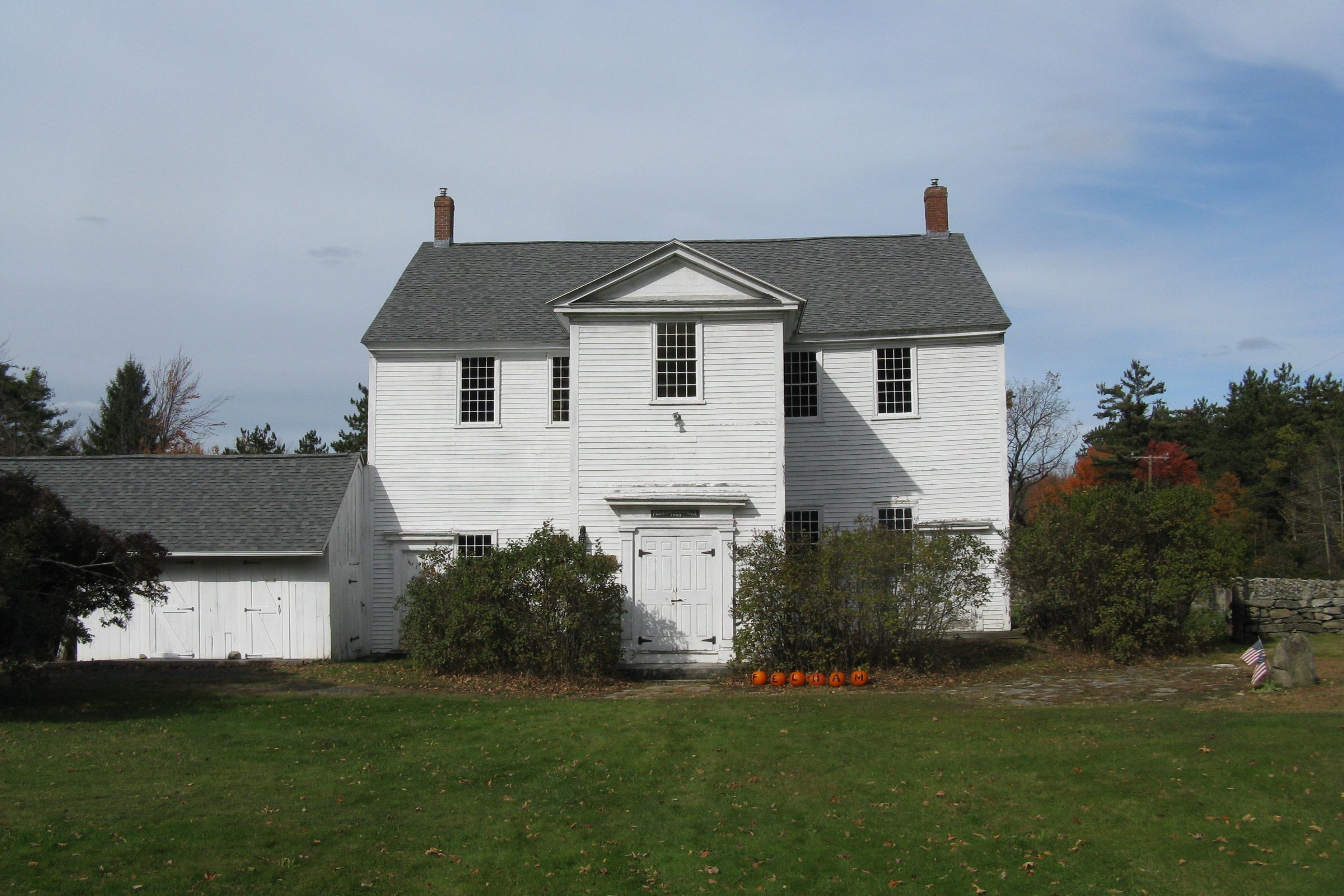
- Old Pelham Town Hall (1743)

- Location within Massachusetts Location within the United States
- Location: Daniel Shays Highway and Amherst Road, Pelham, Massachusetts
- Coordinates: 42°23′32″N 72°24′16″W
- Area: 2.6 acres (1.1 ha)
- Built: 1739
- Architectural style: Greek Revival, Colonial
- NRHP reference No.: 71000085
- Added to NRHP: November 23, 1971

The Pelham Town Hall Historic District encompasses the remaining municipal portion of the center of Pelham, Massachusetts as laid out between 1738 and 1743. It includes the Old Town Hall, built in 1743, which is claimed by the town to be the oldest continuously used town hall in the United States. It also includes the 1843 Greek Revival Congregational church, and the town's first cemetery, founded in 1739. The district was listed in the National Register of Historic Places in 1971.

The land which became Pelham was acquired by the Lisburn Proprietors, Scotch-Irish emigrants, in 1738. The next year, a lot of 10 acres (4.0 ha) was laid out for a meeting house, town pound, training field, and cemetery. The meeting house (now the town hall) was built on this parcel in 1743. Initially used for both religious and civic purposes, its religious function ended after the state mandated the separation of church and state in 1833. The Greek Revival church was built next door in 1839; it now houses the local historical society. The town center is historically significant as the last organized encampment site of rebel forces led by Daniel Shays during the Shays' Rebellion.

The town hall is a two-story wood-frame structure, with a gabled roof and clapboarded exterior. Its main facade is five bays wide, with a projecting central square vestibule. The church is a single-story frame structure, with its gabled roof oriented perpendicular to that of the town hall. It has corner pilasters, which rise to an entablature, and it is topped by a single-stage square belfry with octagonal spire.

== See also ==
- National Register of Historic Places listings in Hampshire County, Massachusetts
