= Mindy Domb =

American politician

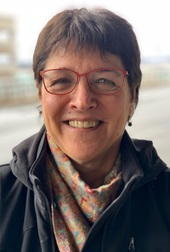

Member of the Massachusetts House of Representatives from the 3rd Hampshire district
- Incumbent
- Assumed office January 2, 2019
- Preceded by: Solomon Goldstein-Rose

Personal details
- Party: Democratic
- Spouse: Matthew Sadof
- Children: 2
- Education: Barnard College; Teachers College
- Website: Official website

Mindy Domb is an American politician who represents the 3rd Hampshire district in the Massachusetts House of Representatives. A member of the Democratic Party, her district encompasses the city of Amherst and part of the town of Granby.

Prior to her election to the state legislature, Domb served as executive director of the Amherst Survival Center.

== Early life and career ==
Domb attended school in New Jersey before enrolling at Barnard College in 1977. She graduated in 1981 with a degree in political science and women's studies.

Following her graduation, Domb worked as an aide to U.S. Representative Ted Weiss. In 1987, she joined the Massachusetts Department of Public Health as an HIV education program advisor. In 1990, she co-founded the Berkshire AIDS Coalition, and served as its inaugural chair until 1994.

== Political career ==
In 2018, after incumbent Solomon Goldstein-Rose unenrolled from the Democratic Party, Domb declared her candidacy for the 3rd Hampshire district. She defeated Eric Nakajima, chairman of the Amherst-Pelham Regional School Committee, in the Democratic primary and was unopposed in the general election.

In 2019, Domb described increasing investment in public education, addressing food insecurity, protecting the environment, increasing access to health care, protecting the rights of women, the LGBT community, workers, and immigrants, and expanding public transit as some of her top priorities.

=== Committee assignments ===
- Chairperson, Joint Committee on Mental Health, Substance Use and Recovery

== Personal life ==
Domb resides in Amherst with her husband, Matthew Sadof. They have two adult daughters. She is Jewish.

== See also ==
- 2019–2020 Massachusetts legislature
- 2021–2022 Massachusetts legislature
