= Massachusetts House of Representatives' 3rd Hampshire district =

American legislative district

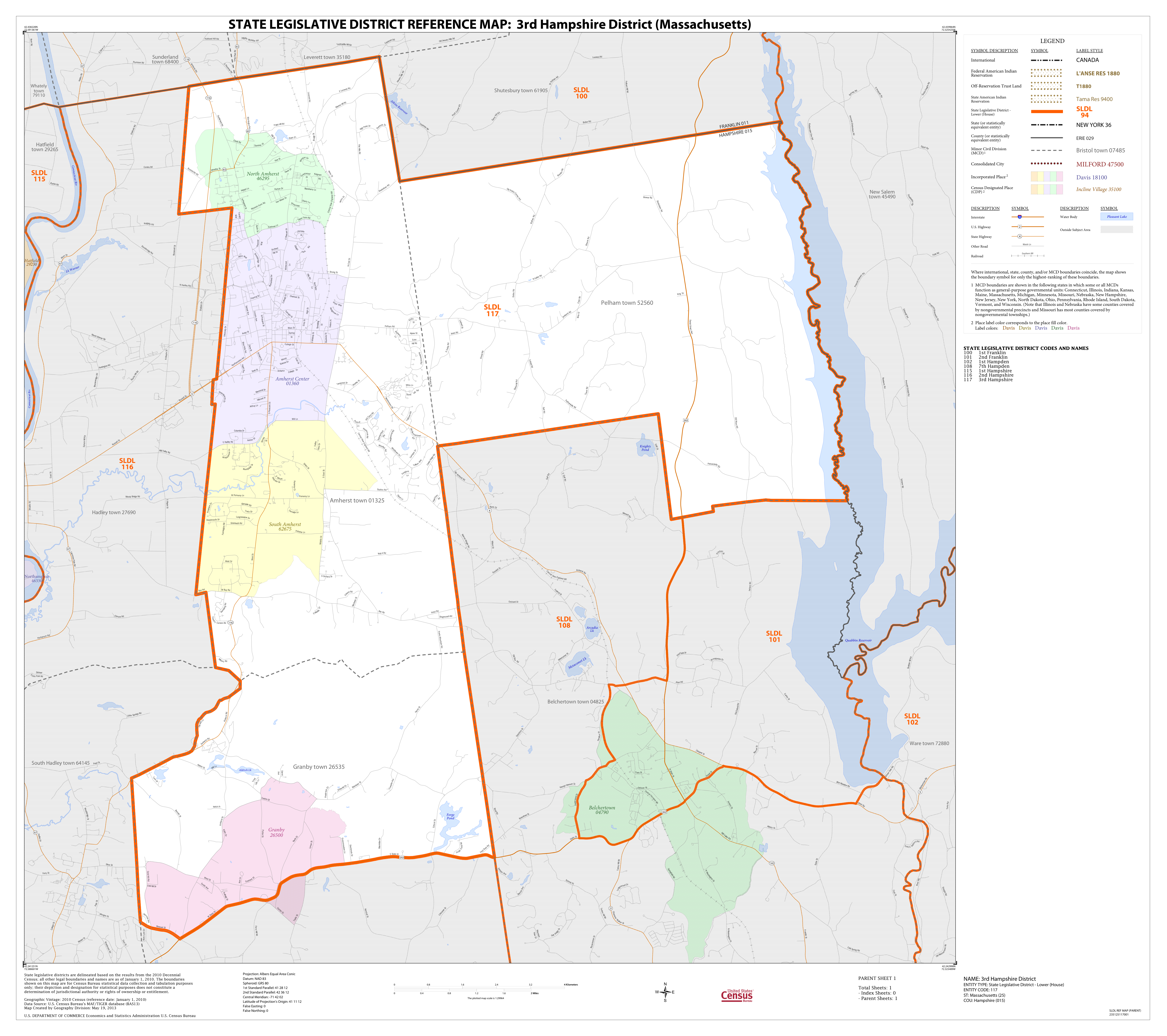
Map of Massachusetts House of Representatives' 3rd Hampshire district, based on the 2010 United States census.

The Massachusetts House of Representatives 3rd Hampshire district or "3rd Hampshire" is an electoral district for the Massachusetts House of Representatives. It consists of the towns of Amherst, Pelham and precinct 1 of Granby. Democrat Mindy Domb of Amherst has represented the district since 2019.

The current district geographic boundary overlaps with those of the Massachusetts Senate's 1st Hampden and Hampshire district and Hampshire, Franklin and Worcester district.

== District history ==
The district has existed in its current form since 2011, but has existed in name since at least 1974.

=== Former locales ===
The district previously covered:

- Hadley, circa 1872, 1927
- Hatfield, circa 1872, 1927
- South Hadley, circa 1927
- Williamsburg, circa 1872

== Representatives ==
- Spencer Shaw, circa 1859
- Henry F. Paige, circa 1920

Representative	Party	Years
James Nolen	Democratic	1975 to 1979
James Collins	Democratic	1979 to 1987
Stan Rosenberg	Democratic	1987 to 1991
Ellen Story	Democratic	1992 to 2017
Solomon Goldstein-Rose	Democratic, Independent	2017 to 2019
Mindy Domb	Democratic	2019

== Elections ==
Election data comes from Massachusetts Election Statistics.

=== 2010 ===
Candidate	Party	Votes	%
Ellen Story	Democratic	8,087	77.4%
Daniel Sandell	Republican	1,942	18.6%
Daniel Edward Mellick	Independent	412	3.9%
Others		7	0%
Blank		565	
Total		11,013	100%

=== 2012 ===
Candidate	Party	Votes	%
Ellen Story	Democratic	15,365	99%
Others		154	1%
Blank		2,766	
Total		18,285	100%

=== 2014 ===
Candidate	Party	Votes	%
Ellen Story	Democratic	8,125	88%
Kenneth Roberts, Jr	Libertarian	1,092	11.8%
Others		21	0.2%
Blank		727	
Total		9,965	100%

=== 2016 ===
Candidate	Party	Votes	%
Solomon Goldstein-Rose	Democratic	14,601	98.7%
Others		186	1.3%
Blank		3,165	
Total		17,952	100%

=== 2018 ===
Candidate	Party	Votes	%
Mindy Domb	Democratic	9,375	75%
Solomon Goldstein-Rose	Independent	3,098	24.8%
Others		30	0.2%
Blank		1,094	
Total		13,597	100%

== See also ==
- Other Hampshire County districts of the Massachusetts House of Representatives: 1st, 2nd
- Hampshire County districts of the Massachusett Senate: Berkshire, Hampshire, Franklin, and Hampden; 1st Hampden and Hampshire; 2nd Hampden and Hampshire; Hampshire, Franklin and Worcester
- List of former districts of the Massachusetts House of Representatives

== Images ==
Portraits of legislators

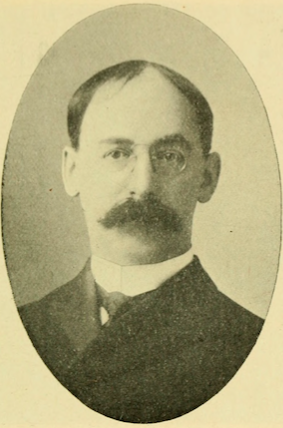
Frank Hosmer

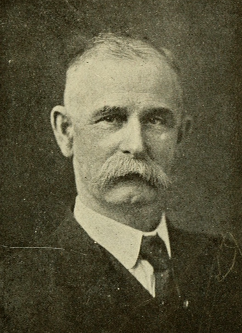
Alvin Wilson

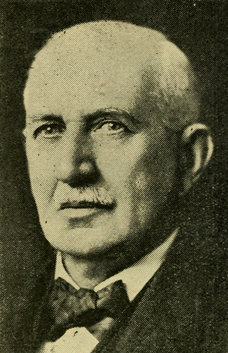
Henry Paige

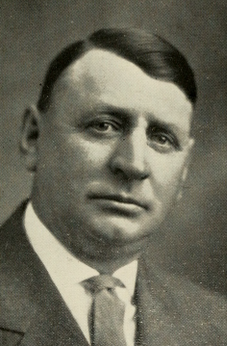
Gerald Jones

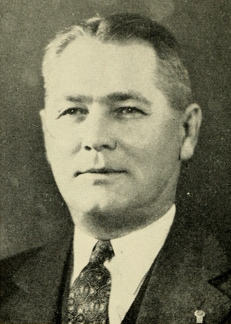
Vincent Dignam

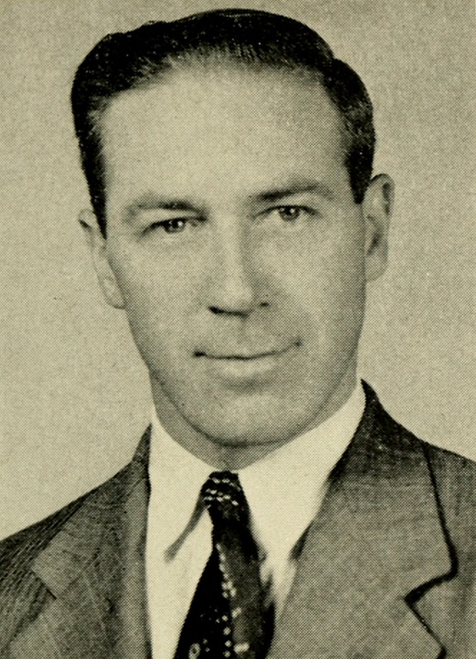
Fletcher Smith

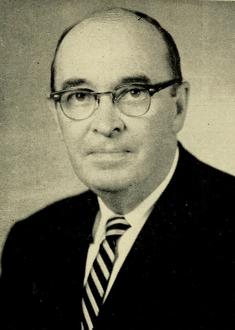
John Clark

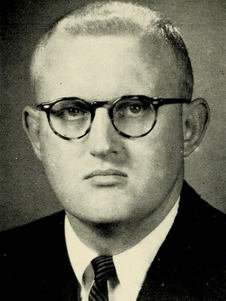
James Nolen

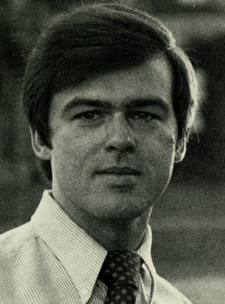
James Collins

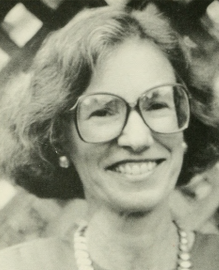
Ellen Story
