= The Church at Home and Abroad =

- First issue: 1887
- Final issue: 1898
- Country: USA
- Based in: Philadelphia, Pennsylvania

The Church at Home and Abroad was a Presbyterian periodical published from 1887 to 1898. Henry A. Nelson was its editor-in-chief for many years. It was headquartered in Philadelphia, Pennsylvania.

== Sources ==
- Amherst Graduates' Quarterly. 1934.
- Laceye C. Warner (2007). Saving Women: Retrieving Evangelistic Theology and Practice. Baylor University Press. ISBN 9781932792263.
- The Church at Home and Abroad in libraries (WorldCat catalog)
