= Ellen Story =

American politician

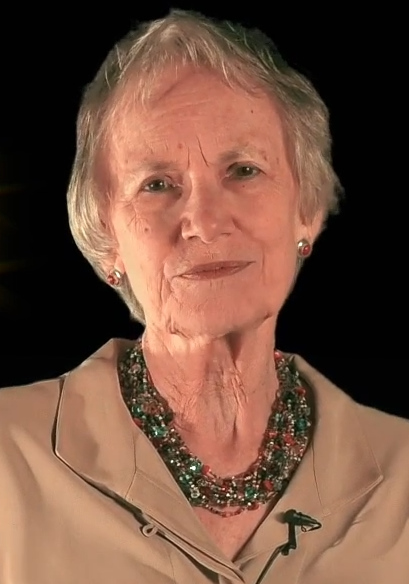
- Ellen Story in 2018

Member of the Massachusetts House of Representatives from the 3rd Hampshire district
- In office 1992–2017
- Preceded by: Stan Rosenberg
- Succeeded by: Solomon Goldstein-Rose

Personal details
- Born: October 17, 1941 (age 84) Oklahoma City, Oklahoma, U.S.
- Party: Democratic
- Education: University of Texas (B.A.); University of Wisconsin; Cambridge College (M.Ed.)

Ellen Story is an American state legislator who served in the Massachusetts House of Representatives.

== Early life ==
Story lived in Texas before moving to Amherst in 1972. She earned a bachelor's degree at the University of Texas. Story worked for the Family Planning Council of Western Massachusetts for 17 years. She also served on the Amherst School Committee.

== Political career ==
Story's policy during her time in the Massachusetts House of Representatives focused on issues related to women, mental health, GMOs and raising the income tax.
