= Henry Addison Nelson =

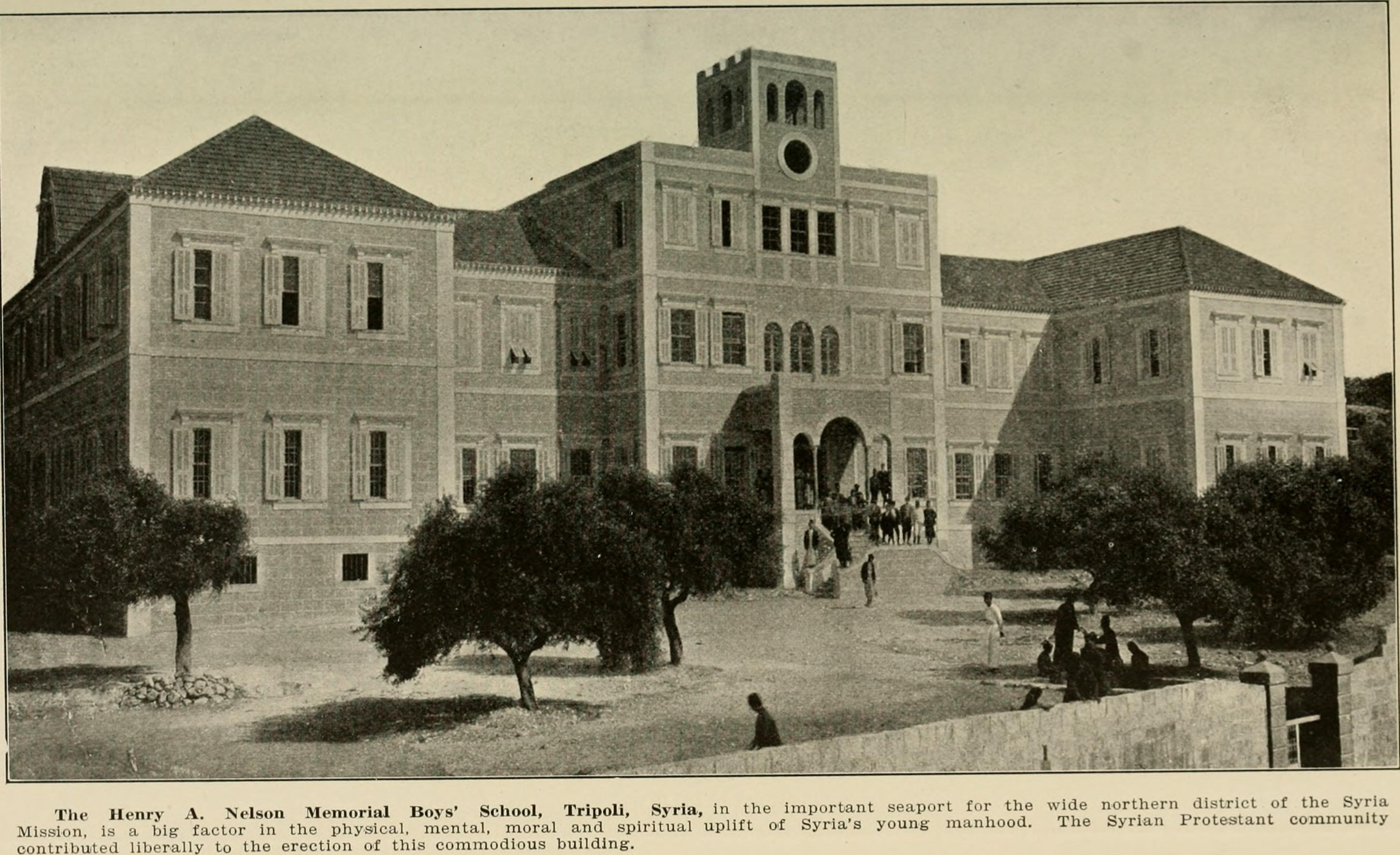
The Henry A. Nelson Memorial Boys' School, Tripoli.

Henry Addison Nelson (October 31, 1820, Amherst, Massachusetts – December 31, 1906, St. Louis) was a Presbyterian clergyman. "He was educated at Hamilton College, Clinton, N. Y. (A.B., 1840), after which he taught at Eaton, N. Y., and Homer, N. Y., until 1843, when he entered Auburn Theological Seminary, from which he was graduated in 1846." He then held the pulpit at the First Presbyterian Church, Auburn, N. Y. (1846–56) and at the First Presbyterian Church, St. Louis (1856–68). He was "professor of systematic and pastoral theology at Lane Theological Seminary, Cincinnati (1868-74), pastor of the First Presbyterian Church at Geneva, N. Y. (1874-1885), and acting pastor at Independence, Mo. (1885-86)." He was also for many years editor of the Church magazine, The Church at Home and Abroad. The Henry A. Nelson Memorial Boys' School, in Tripoli, Lebanon, was named after him.

== Sources ==
- Amherst Graduates' Quarterly. Alumni Council of Amherst College. 1934.
- Herzog, Johann Jakob; Schaff, P.; Hauck, Albert; Jackson, Samuel M.; Sherman, Charles Colebrook; Gilmore, George William (1910). The New Schaff-Herzog Encyclopedia of Religious Knowledge: Embracing Biblical, Historical, Doctrinal, and Practical Theology and Biblical, Theological, and Ecclesiastical Biography from the Earliest Times to the Present Day. Vol. 8. Funk and Wagnalls Company.
- Temple, Wayne Calhoun (1995). Abraham Lincoln, from Skeptic to Prophet. Mayhaven Publishing. ISBN 9781878044365.
