= Turners Falls Airport =

- IATA: none; ICAO: none; FAA LID: 0B5

Summary
- Airport type: Public
- Owner: Town of Montague
- Serves: Montague, Massachusetts
- Elevation AMSL: 359 ft / 109 m
- Coordinates: 42°35′30″N 072°31′23″W

Map
- Interactive map of Turners Falls Airport

Runways
Direction	Length		Surface
Direction	ft	m	Surface
16/34	3,200	975	Asphalt

Statistics (2022)
- Aircraft operations: 21,245
- Based aircraft: 30
- Source: Federal Aviation Administration

Turners Falls Airport (FAA LID: 0B5), also referred to as Turners Falls Municipal Airport, is a town owned, public use airport located three nautical miles (6 km) north of the central business district of Montague, a town in Franklin County, Massachusetts, United States. It is owned by the Town of Montague. It is included in the National Plan of Integrated Airport Systems for 2011–2015, which categorized it as a general aviation facility.

== History ==
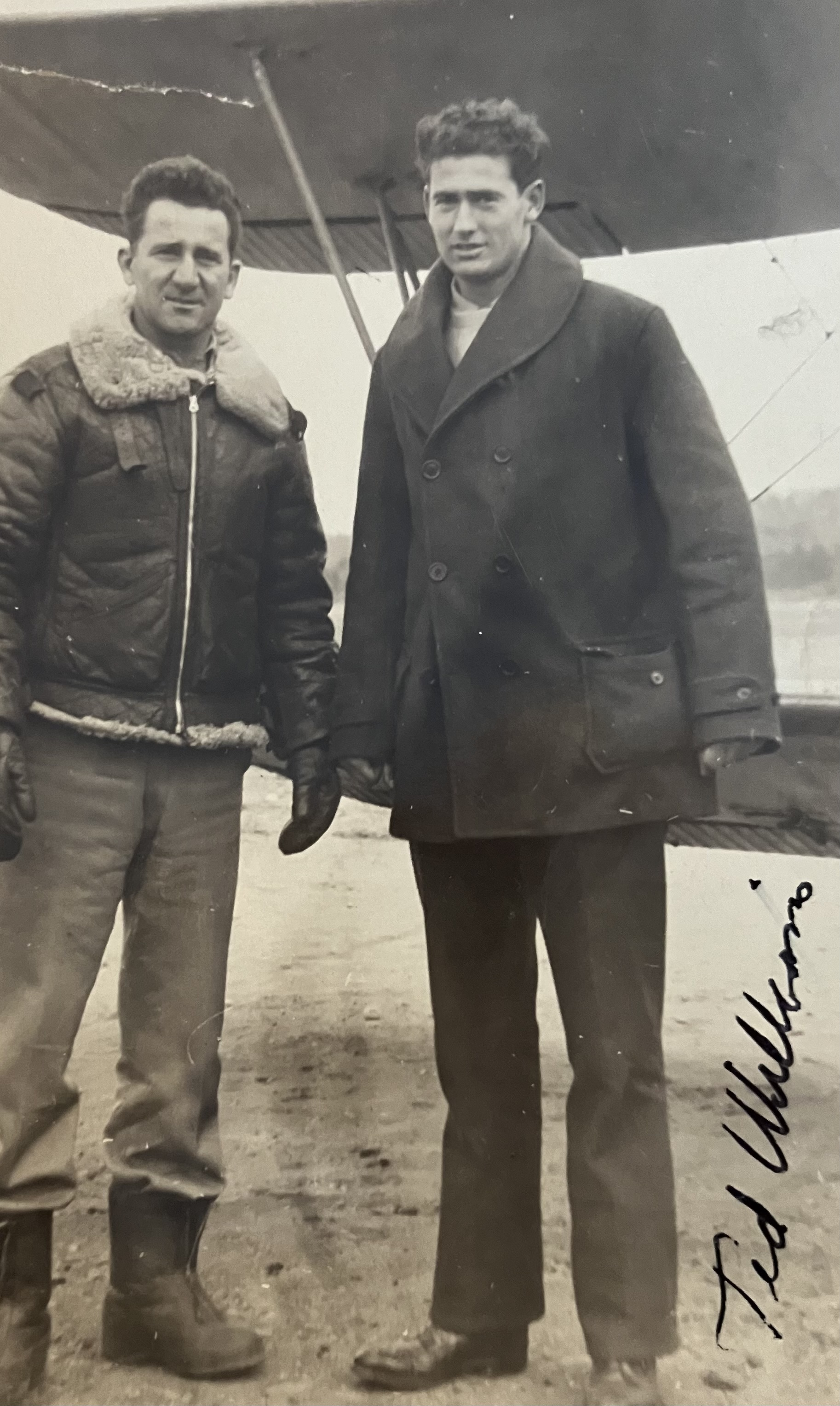
Ted Williams (Right) Flight training at the airport in 1942

Although started by a private group, the airport was the site of a large Civilian Conservation Corps camp during the Great Depression. Workers lived in tents on the grounds and labored by day. Built in 1940 by the Works Progress Administration, the airport was used by the U.S. Navy for basic aviation training in World War II; students, including famous Boston Red Sox players turned aviators Ted Williams and Johnny Pesky, trained there. The field was expanded after the war and eventually gained the name Turners Falls Municipal Airport.

Turners Falls Airport was mentioned by name by President Joe Biden in a 2022 speech highlighting his $1.2 trillion infrastructure bill.

== Airport ==
The airport complex is situated in a valley between a small mountain and the Barton's Cove oxbow of the Connecticut River. A dispute with Native Americans over alleged burial grounds once threatened to shut down the airport but an accord has been reached on the matter.

The Airport Industrial Park includes high-tech manufacturers and biotech companies. Private jet traffic has increased due to local corporations and students at the Five Colleges, Williams College, Northfield Mount Hermon School (NMH), Deerfield Academy and Eaglebrook School.

The nearest airports to Turners Falls Airport are Orange Municipal Airport, 10 nm to the east; Northampton Airport, 16 nm to the south; and Dillant–Hopkins Airport in Keene, New Hampshire, 22 nm to the north.

== Facilities and aircraft ==
Turners Falls Airport covers an area of 227 acres (92 ha) at an elevation of 359 feet (109 m) above mean sea level. It has one runway designated 16/34 with an asphalt surface measuring 3,200 by 75 feet (975 x 23 m). There is no control tower.

For the 12-month period ending March 29, 2022, the airport had 21,245 aircraft operations, an average of 58 per day: all general aviation save for 150 military flights and 95 air taxi flights. At that time there were 30 aircraft based at this airport, 29 single-engine craft and a single helicopter.

Turners Falls Airport was serviced from 1971 by Pioneer Aviation, the fixed-base operator until its operation was formally taken over by the town in 2021. It provides repair services, inspections, flight training and fuel. The airport is also home of the Franklin County Flying Club, a non-profit organization providing plane rentals to local pilots.

== See also ==
- List of airports in Massachusetts
