= Allen St. Pierre =

Allen St. Pierre served as the Executive Director of the National Organization for the Reform of Marijuana Laws (NORML), an American non-profit organization that wishes to remove the criminal penalties for and legalize cannabis. St. Pierre was hired by NORML's Board of Directors in 1991 when he worked as a Communications Director for the organization. He gradually rose through the ranks, becoming the Deputy National Director in 1993. When the NORML Foundation was created in 1997, St. Pierre was chosen to be its executive director. The NORML Foundation is a sister organization of NORML that works "to better educate the public about marijuana and marijuana policy options, and to assist victims of the current laws".

St. Pierre was the Executive Director of NORML from January 2005 until July 2016 when he stepped down. He was the seventh person to be NORML's Executive Director. He served on the Board of Directors of NORML and the NORML Foundation.

== See also ==
- National Organization for the Reform of Marijuana Laws
- Cannabis in the United States
- Legal history of cannabis in the United States
- Medical cannabis
- Drug prohibition
- Legal issues of cannabis
