= Amherst-Pelham Regional School District =

Public school system in Amherst, Massachusetts, US

Location
- 170 Chestnut Street; Amherst, MA 01002-1825 New England United States
- Coordinates: 42.384866°N 72.511105°W

District information
- Type: Public
- Grades: K–12
- Superintendent: Doug Slaughter (interim)
- Asst. superintendent(s): Sasha Figueroa
- Schools: 6
- Budget: $35,197,652 total $24,555 per pupil (2021-2022)

Students and staff
- Students: 1,230 (2022–2023)
- Teachers: 111.9 (2021–2022)
- Student–teacher ratio: 11.4 to 1 (2021–2022)

Other information
- Website: Amherst-Pelham Regional Schools

Amherst-Pelham Regional School District (ARPS) is a school district in Massachusetts which includes the towns of Amherst, Pelham, Leverett, and Shutesbury, though the elementary schools of the latter two towns are not part of the school district. It includes four elementary schools, a middle school, and a high school.

== Schools ==
=== Fort River Elementary School ===
Fort River Elementary School is located at 70 South East Street in Amherst. As of 2023, the current principal is Tamera Sullivan-Daley.

=== Crocker Farm Elementary School ===
Crocker Farm Elementary School is located at 280 West Street in Amherst. As of 2023, the current principal is Derek Shea.

=== Pelham Elementary School ===
Pelham Elementary School is located at 45 Amherst Road in Pelham. The current principal is Leigh Whiting-Jones.

=== Wildwood Elementary School ===
Wildwood Elementary School is located at 71 Strong Street in Amherst. As of 2022, the current principal is Nick Yaffe.

=== Amherst Regional Middle School ===
Amherst Regional Middle School, located at 170 Chestnut Street in Amherst, includes students in grades 7 and 8 from all four towns in the district. The current principal is Deigo Sharon. Every year students participate in community service projects. In 2019, they won 15 awards in a professional COC and donated 1000 pounds of food to local food charities.

=== Amherst Regional High School ===
Amherst Regional High School, located at 21 Mattoon Street in Amherst, includes students in grades 9 through 12. The most recent principal retired as of November 1, 2018.

=== Mark's Meadow Elementary School ===
Mark's Meadow Elementary School was located in Amherst, and was the smallest of the district's elementary schools in that town. In 2009, the Amherst and Regional School Committees considered plans to close Mark's Meadow. In May of that year, it was voted to close the school. At the end of the 2009–2010 school year, the school was closed.

The school was also used by the nearby University of Massachusetts Amherst, which also owns the building, as the location for their educational program. Some of the students who attend Mark's Meadow also lived in university housing.

== Food Service Program ==
Until 2003, the District managed its own food service program. At that time, they had Chartwells Educational Dining Service provide meals. In 2007, they began looking for other providers in order to save money. In March 2008, Whitsons Food Nutrition was chosen. The amount saved was $89,000 not including insurance savings. The company pays employees' health insurance, thereby saving the district that cost.
