= Northampton Airport =

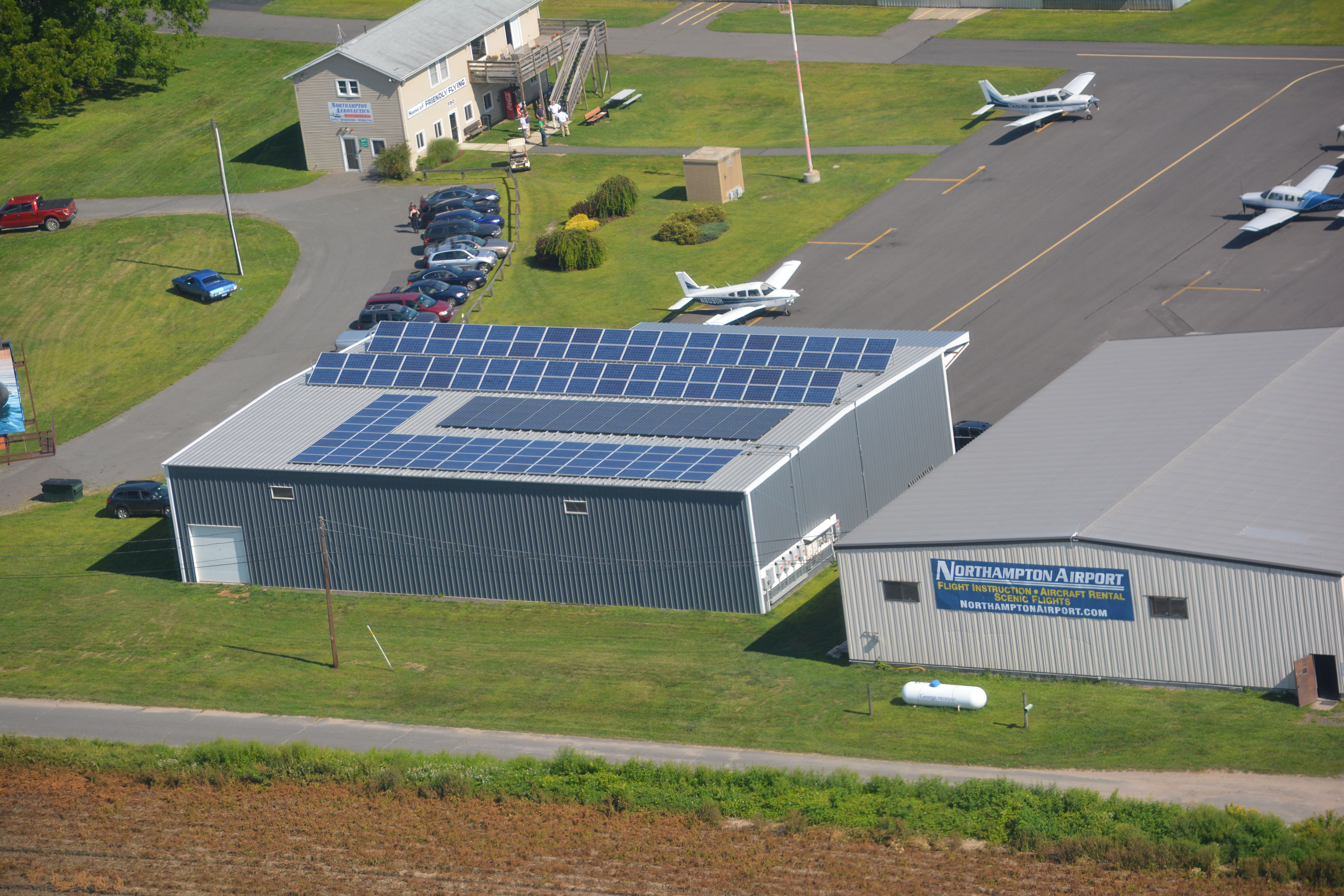
- IATA: none; ICAO: none; FAA LID: 7B2

Summary
- Airport type: Privately owned, open to the public
- Operator: Seven Bravo Two, LLC
- Location: Northampton, Massachusetts
- Elevation AMSL: 122 ft / 37.2 m
- Coordinates: 42°19′41″N 72°36′41″W
- Website: northamptonairport.com

Map
- Interactive map of Northampton Airport

Runways
Direction	Length		Surface
Direction	ft	m	Surface
14/32	3,365	1,026	Asphalt

Northampton Airport (FAA LID: 7B2) is a public airport located one mile (1.6 km) northeast of central business district of Northampton, a city in Hampshire County, Massachusetts, USA. The airport covers 55 acres (22 ha) and has one runway that is 3,365 feet (1,026 m) in length and 50 feet (15 m) in width. Avgas fuel is self-service and is available 24 hours a day. Northampton Airport has an estimated 73 flights per day and estimated 92 based aircraft.

== History ==
The Northampton Airport was opened as a commercial airport on April 1, 1929. The airport was visited by the Granville brothers (who were responsible for building the Gee Bee airplane).

During World War II, the airport was used as a naval training facility and trained pilots for the war effort. The airport has been in continuous operation since its inception in 1929.

== Flight school ==
Northampton Airport contains a flight school which consists of 15 flight instructors and 11 aircraft. The aircraft range from light sport to twin engine. Also available for training is the Redbird Full Motion Flight Simulator.

Northampton Airport has a full service maintenance facility with four full-time mechanics.
