= Pelham, Massachusetts =

- Town
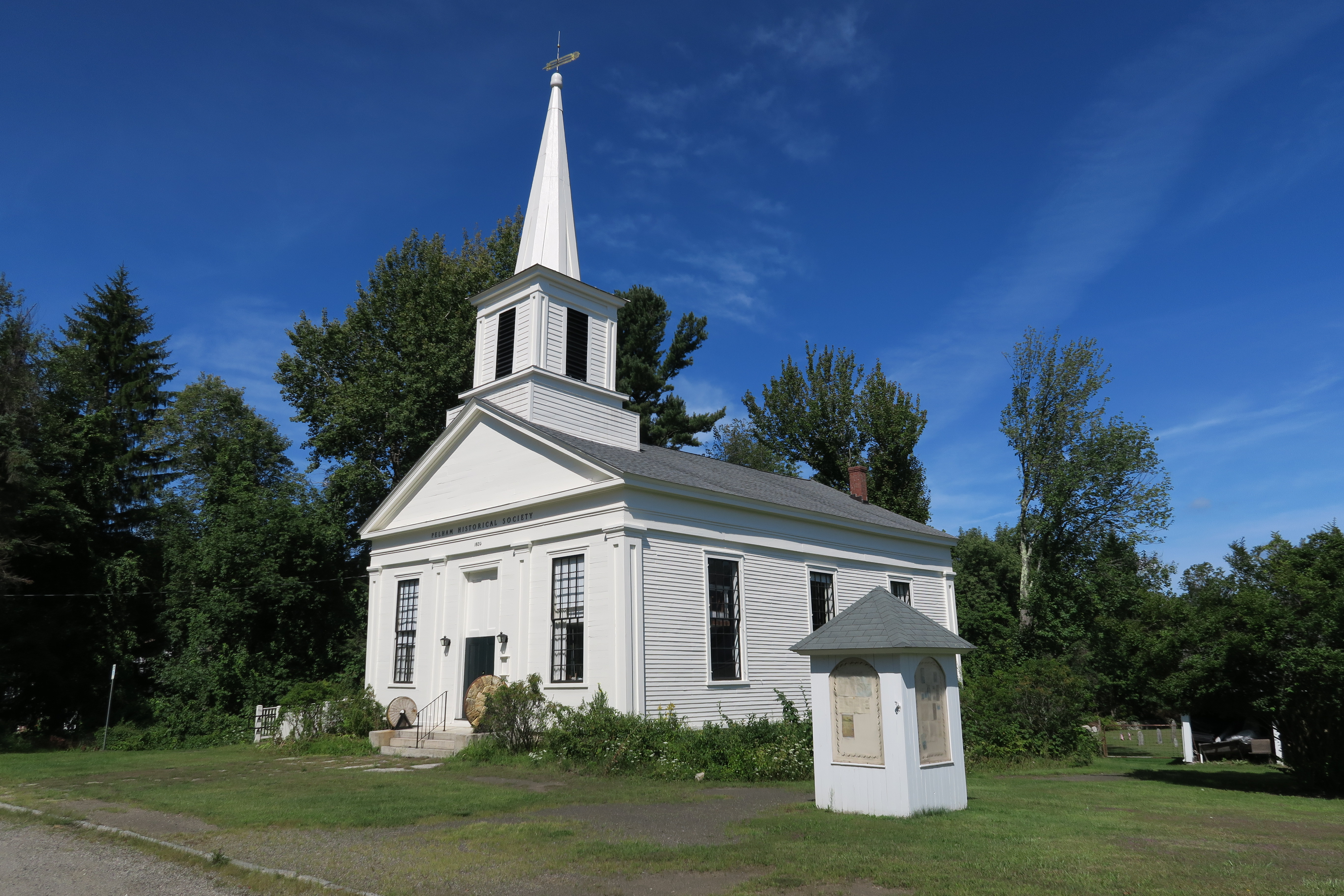
- Pelham Hill Congregational Church

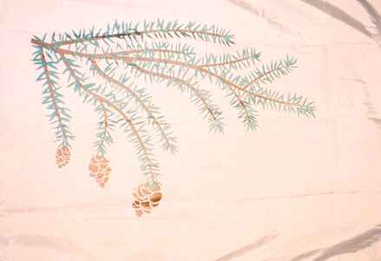
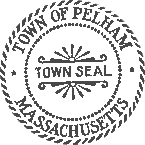
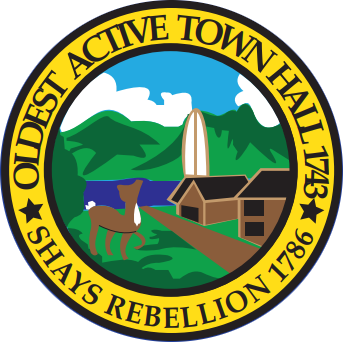
- Flag Seal Coat of arms
- Nickname: The Town of Trees
- Location in Hampshire County in Massachusetts
- Coordinates: 42°23′35″N 72°24′15″W
- Country: United States
- State: Massachusetts
- County: Hampshire
- Settled: 1738
- Incorporated: 1743

Government
  - Type: Open town meeting

Area
  - Total: 26.5 sq mi (68.6 km^{2})
  - Land: 25.1 sq mi (64.9 km^{2})
  - Water: 1.4 sq mi (3.7 km^{2})
- Elevation: 1,145 ft (349 m)

Population (2020)
  - Total: 1,280
  - Density: 51.1/sq mi (19.7/km^{2})
- Time zone: UTC−5 (Eastern)
  - Summer (DST): UTC−4 (Eastern)
- ZIP Codes: 01002 (shared with Amherst); 01007 (Belchertown)
- Area code: 413
- FIPS code: 25-52560
- GNIS feature ID: 0618205
- Website: pelhamma.gov

Pelham is a town in Hampshire County, Massachusetts, United States. The population was 1,280 at the 2020 census. Its ZIP Code is shared with Amherst.

Pelham is part of the Springfield, Massachusetts Metropolitan Statistical Area.

== History ==
A drawing of the town flag of Pelham.

Pelham (/ˈpɛləm/ PEL-əm; the "h" is silent) was part of the Equivalent Lands compromise, and was first settled in 1738 by mostly Presbyterian Scotch-Irish immigrants. It was officially incorporated in 1743. The town is named for the Pelham family; Henry Pelham was Prime Minister of the United Kingdom at the time of the town's incorporation. The town is best known as being home to Daniel Shays, leader of Shays' Rebellion, a series of protests against crushing austerity measures in Massachusetts during 1786 and 1787. The rebellion, planned in Conkey's Tavern in town, drew support from many towns in central and western Massachusetts, but it met its practical end when the angry farmers' force refused to fight Governor Bowdoin's army and they were dispersed in a rout in nearby Petersham. Pelham also holds the distinction of having the oldest town hall in continuous use in the United States. A town meeting is held there for that primary purpose each year.

Pelham's boundaries have changed twice in its history. Originally a much larger town, rectangular in shape (except for a small extension southward taking up part of the modern area of Knight's Corner) and extending eastward to the top of Prescott Hill (where Daniel Shays once lived), the land east of the West Branch of the Swift River was annexed by the town of Prescott in the latter half of the nineteenth centuries (maps made in 1855 and 1862 both show this land still belonging to Pelham). The landscape would change once again, however, when the Quabbin Reservoir was formed along the branches of the Swift River. The reservoir filled along the river, and protected lands along its edge became part of the Quabbin Reservation. It was at this time as well that the towns of the valley were dis-incorporated, and a portion of Enfield which now constitutes the town's southeast corner (roughly east of Caldwell Brook and Knight's Corner) was given to the town. Because the reservoir divided the town from its old lands in Prescott, however, that portion of land was not returned to the town, but given to New Salem instead.

On March 23, 1860, a young man named Warren Gibbs, who lived in the town, died after eating some oysters prepared for him by his wife, Mary Felton. His brother had a tombstone produced that claimed that Felton poisoned him. After that, the tombstone was repeatedly destroyed, and the brother had to hire guards to protect it.

== Geography ==
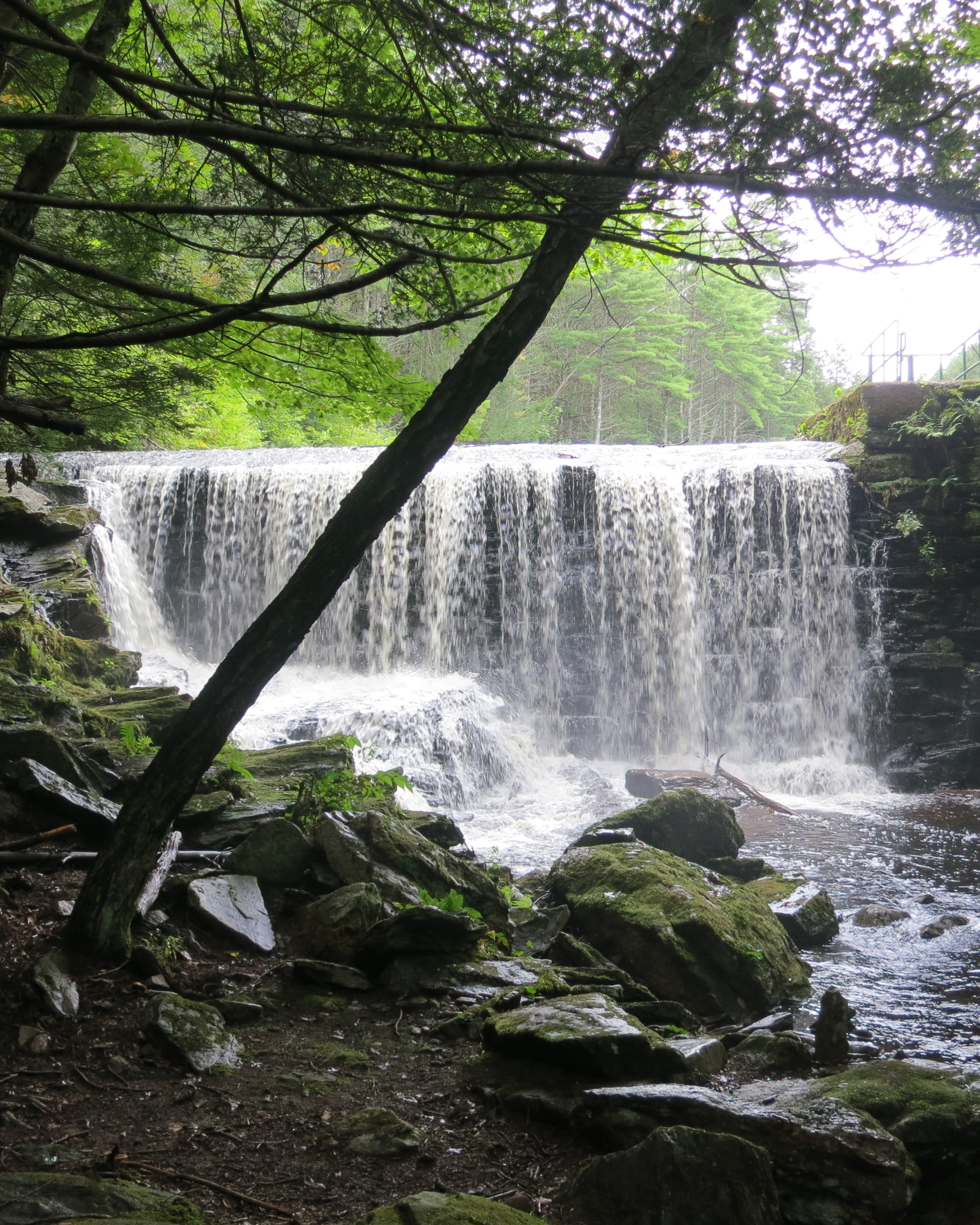
Buffam Falls Conservation Areas is located along the Metacomet-Monadnock Trail

According to the United States Census Bureau, the town has a total area of 26.5 square miles (69 km^{2}), of which 25.1 square miles (65 km^{2}) is land and 1.4 square miles (3.6 km^{2}) (5.40%) is water. The town lies along the western edge of the Quabbin Reservoir, its town line following the former path of the West Branch of the Swift River, which once flowed through the town. The town lies along the hills which divide the Pioneer Valley along the Connecticut River to the west from the Quabbin Valley to the east. The brooks in town also flow in both these directions; those in the eastern third of town drain towards the Quabbin, with the western brooks draining towards the Connecticut. The town is fairly forested, some of which are protected; these include Cadwell Memorial Forest, Buffam Falls Conservation Area and the Quabbin lands.

Pelham is the northeasternmost town in Hampshire County, bordering Franklin County to the north and east. (Prior to the formation of the Quabbin Reservoir, the town of Prescott was the northeast corner of the county, but its lands were absorbed by New Salem.) Pelham is bordered by Shutesbury to the north, New Salem to the east, Belchertown to the south and Amherst to the west. (Because of the reservoir, there is no direct connection between Pelham and New Salem.) The historical center of town is located 14 miles (23 km) east of the county seat of Northampton, 25 miles (40 km) north-northeast of Springfield, 45 miles (72 km) northwest of Worcester, and 84 miles (135 km) west of Boston (though the latter two distances are hampered by not having direct routes across the Quabbin).

== Transportation ==
U.S. Route 202, which was rerouted due to the Quabbin Reservoir project along the Daniel Shays Highway, runs through the eastern side of town. Other than a small portion of Route 9 which clips the town's southwestern corner, Route 202 is the only highway through town. The town is roughly equidistant from Interstate 90, Interstate 91 and Route 2 to the south, west, and north, respectively.

The nearest rail service is the Amtrak Vermonter service in Northampton. Several general aviation airports are located in nearby towns, but the nearest national air service can be reached at Bradley International Airport in Connecticut.

== Education ==
The town is part of the Amherst-Pelham Regional School District along with Amherst, Leverett, and Shutesbury. Pelham has one elementary school, the Pelham Elementary School, which serves K–5. Students in Pelham then attend Amherst Regional Middle School for grades six through eight, followed by Amherst Regional High School for grades nine through twelve.

== Demographics ==
Historical population
Year	Pop.	±%
1790	1,040	—
1850	983	−5.5%
1860	748	−23.9%
1870	673	−10.0%
1880	614	−8.8%
1890	486	−20.8%
1900	462	−4.9%
1910	467	+1.1%
1920	503	+7.7%
1930	455	−9.5%
1940	568	+24.8%
1950	579	+1.9%
1960	805	+39.0%
1970	937	+16.4%
1980	1,112	+18.7%
1990	1,373	+23.5%
2000	1,403	+2.2%
2010	1,321	−5.8%
2020	1,280	−3.1%
2024*	1,343	+4.9%
* = population estimate. Source: United States census records and Population Estimates Program data.

As of 2000, the US census records there were 1,403 people, 545 households, and 382 families residing in the town. The population density was 56.0 inhabitants per square mile (21.6/km^{2}). There were 556 housing units at an average density of 22.2 per square mile (8.6/km^{2}). The racial makeup of the town was 95.08% White, 1.43% African American, 1.07% Asian, 0.64% from other races, and 1.78% from two or more races. Hispanic or Latino of any race were 1.85% of the population.

There were 545 households, out of which 32.5% had children under the age of 18 living with them, 58.2% were married couples living together, 8.6% had a female householder with no husband present, and 29.9% were non-families. Of all households, 19.8% were made up of individuals, and 6.2% had someone living alone who was 65 years of age or older. The average household size was 2.57 and the average family size was 2.95.

In the town, the population was spread out, with 23.2% under the age of 18, 7.7% from 18 to 24, 24.4% from 25 to 44, 32.1% from 45 to 64, and 12.5% who were 65 years of age or older. The median age was 42 years. For every 100 females, there were 99.9 males. For every 100 females age 18 and over, there were 94.1 males.

The median income for a household in the town was $61,339, and the median income for a family was $71,667. Males had a median income of $50,435 versus $33,500 for females. The per capita income for the town was $29,821. About 2.6% of families and 4.9% of the population were below the poverty line, including 3.1% of those under age 18 and 5.8% of those age 65 or over.

== Notable people ==
- Daniel Shays (1747–1825), rebellion leader
- Lettie S. Bigelow (1848/49–1906), author
- Deb Talan (born 1968), singer-songwriter
- H. W. Harkness (1821–1901), mycologist and natural historian
