= 2016 United States presidential election in Massachusetts =

- November 8, 2016
- Turnout: 74.51% ▲

Nominee	Hillary Clinton	Donald Trump
Party	Democratic	Republican
Home state	New York	New York
Running mate	Tim Kaine	Mike Pence
Electoral vote	11	0
Popular vote	1,995,196	1,090,893
Percentage	60.01%	32.81%

Clinton
40–50%
50–60%
60–70%
70–80%
80–90%
90–100%
Trump
40–50%
50–60%
60–70%
Tie
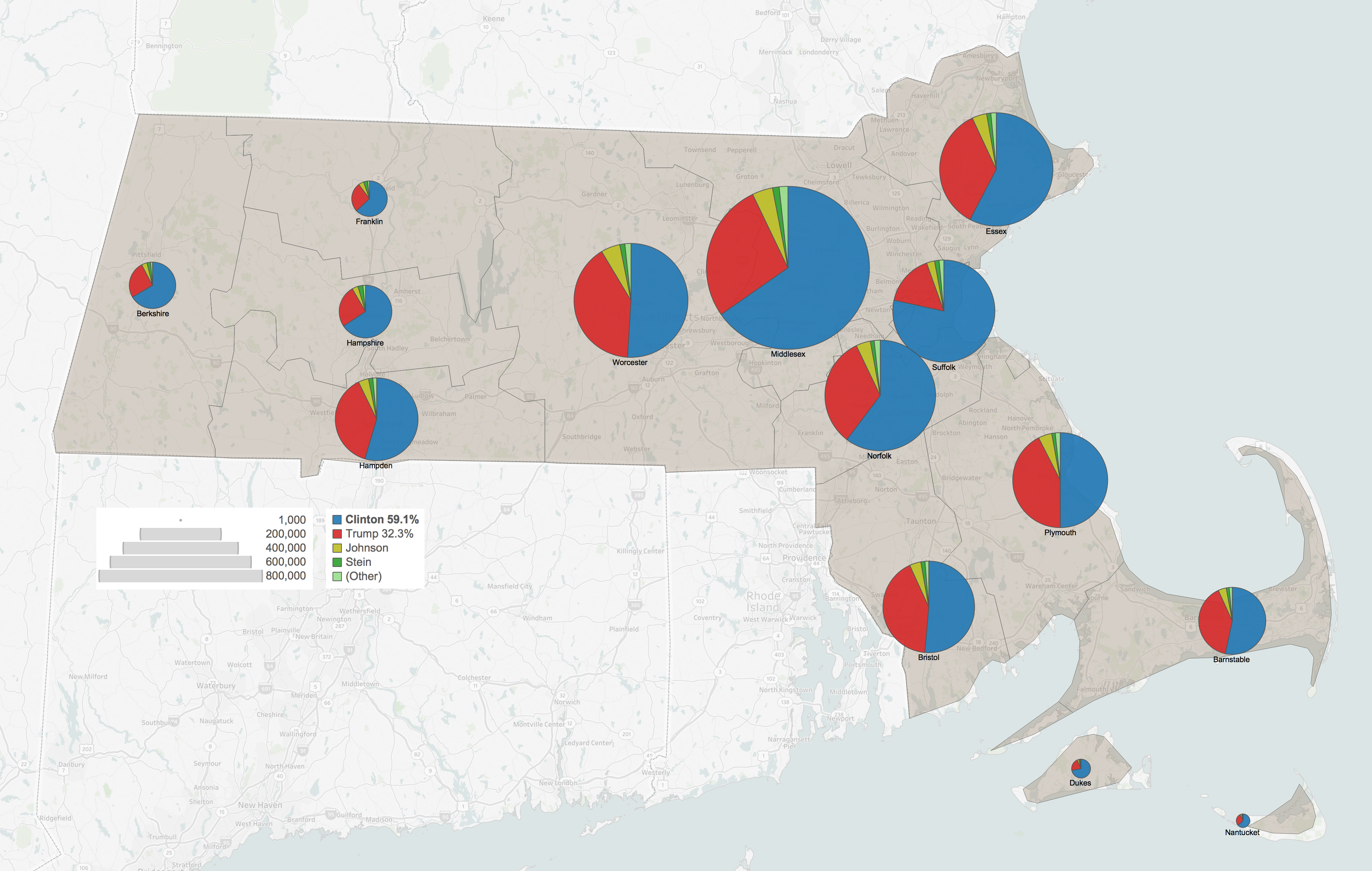
- Results by county showing number of votes by size and candidates by color
President before election
Barack Obama
Democratic
Elected President
Donald Trump
Republican

Treemap of the popular vote by county

The 2016 United States presidential election in Massachusetts was held on Tuesday, November 8, 2016, as part of the 2016 United States presidential election, in which all 50 states plus the District of Columbia participated. Massachusetts voters chose electors to represent them in the Electoral College via a popular vote, pitting the Republican Party's nominee, businessman Donald Trump, and running mate Indiana Governor Mike Pence against Democratic Party nominee, former Secretary of State Hillary Clinton, and her running mate Virginia Senator Tim Kaine. Massachusetts has 11 electoral votes in the Electoral College.

In the general election, Clinton won Massachusetts with 60.01% of the vote, while Trump received 32.81%. This marked the fourth consecutive election in which the Democratic candidate won over 60% of the vote, and the seventh in a row in which they won in every single county in the state, thus making Massachusetts and Hawaii the only states in which Clinton won every single county. Massachusetts had been a Democratic-leaning state since 1928, and a Democratic stronghold since 1960, and has maintained extremely large Democratic margins since 1996. It also marked the fourth consecutive election in which both the Democratic and Republican vote shares in Massachusetts fell; since 2004, the combined vote shares of the two major parties in the Commonwealth have gradually declined from 98.72% to 94.32%.

Clinton improved on Obama's 2012 performance by around 4%, due to a large swing to the Democrat in the metropolitan Boston area, making the state one of 11 (along with the District of Columbia) that shifted towards the Democrats. Meanwhile, the New Bedford and Fall River areas and the western part of Massachusetts, particularly eastern Berkshire County, swung to Trump.

Trump became the first Republican since 1912 to lose the once reliably Republican town of Boxford, which has voted against him all three of his runs for presidency. That being said, Clinton became the first Democrat to win Boxford in a presidential election since its creation.

== Primary elections ==
=== Democratic primary ===
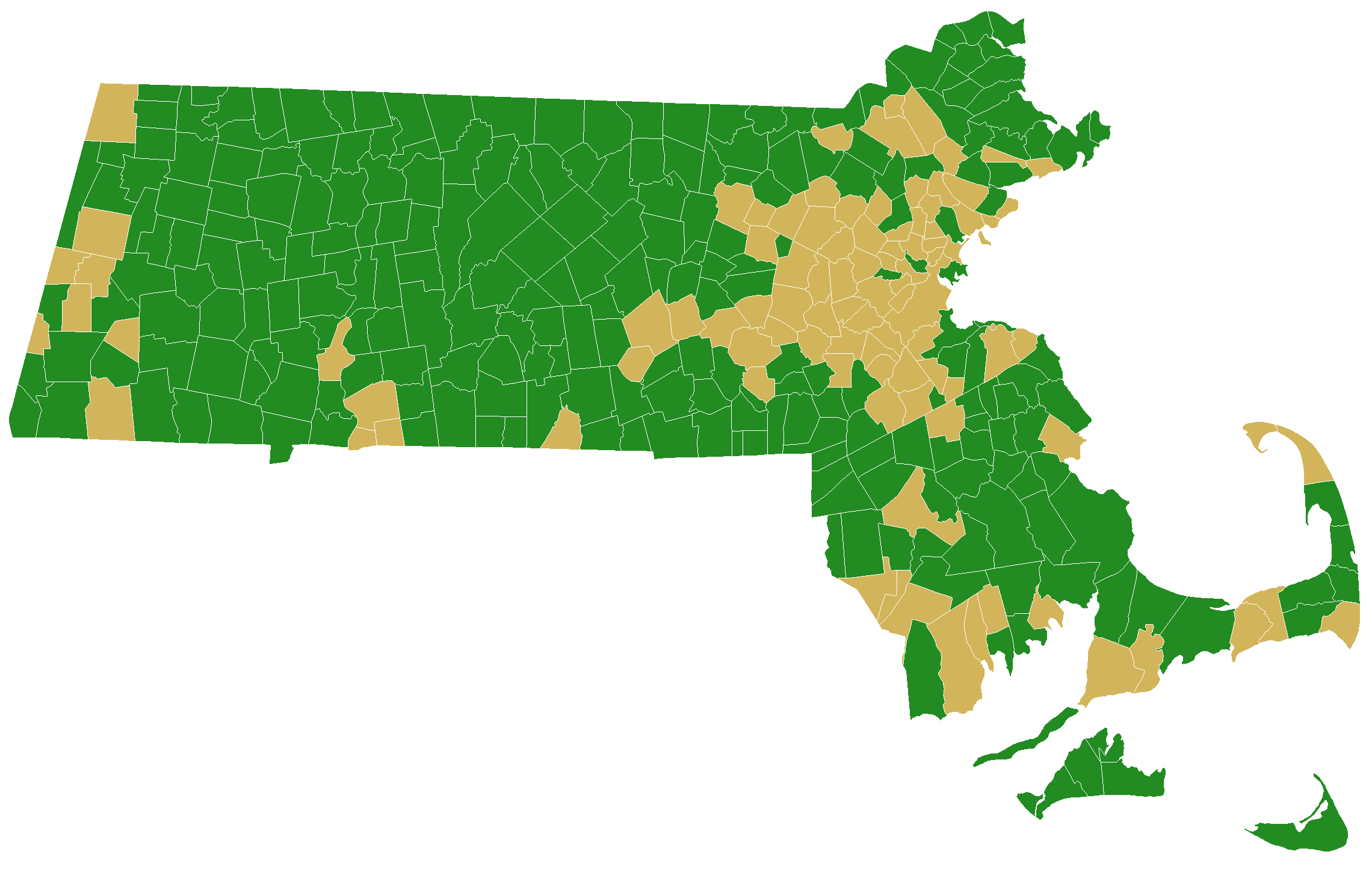
Results of the Democratic primary by town Hillary Clinton Bernie Sanders

Results of the Massachusetts Democratic primary on March 1, 2016
Candidate	Popular vote		Estimated delegates		
Candidate	Count	Percentage	Pledged	Unpledged	Total
Hillary Clinton	606,822	49.73%	46	21	67
Bernie Sanders	589,803	48.33%	45	1	46
Martin O'Malley (withdrawn)	4,783	0.39%	0	0	0
Rocky De La Fuente	1,545	0.13%	0	0	0
No preference	8,090	0.66%	–	2	2
All others	4,927	0.40%	0	0	0
Blank votes	4,326	0.35%	–	–	–
Total	1,220,296	100%	91	24	115

=== Republican primary ===
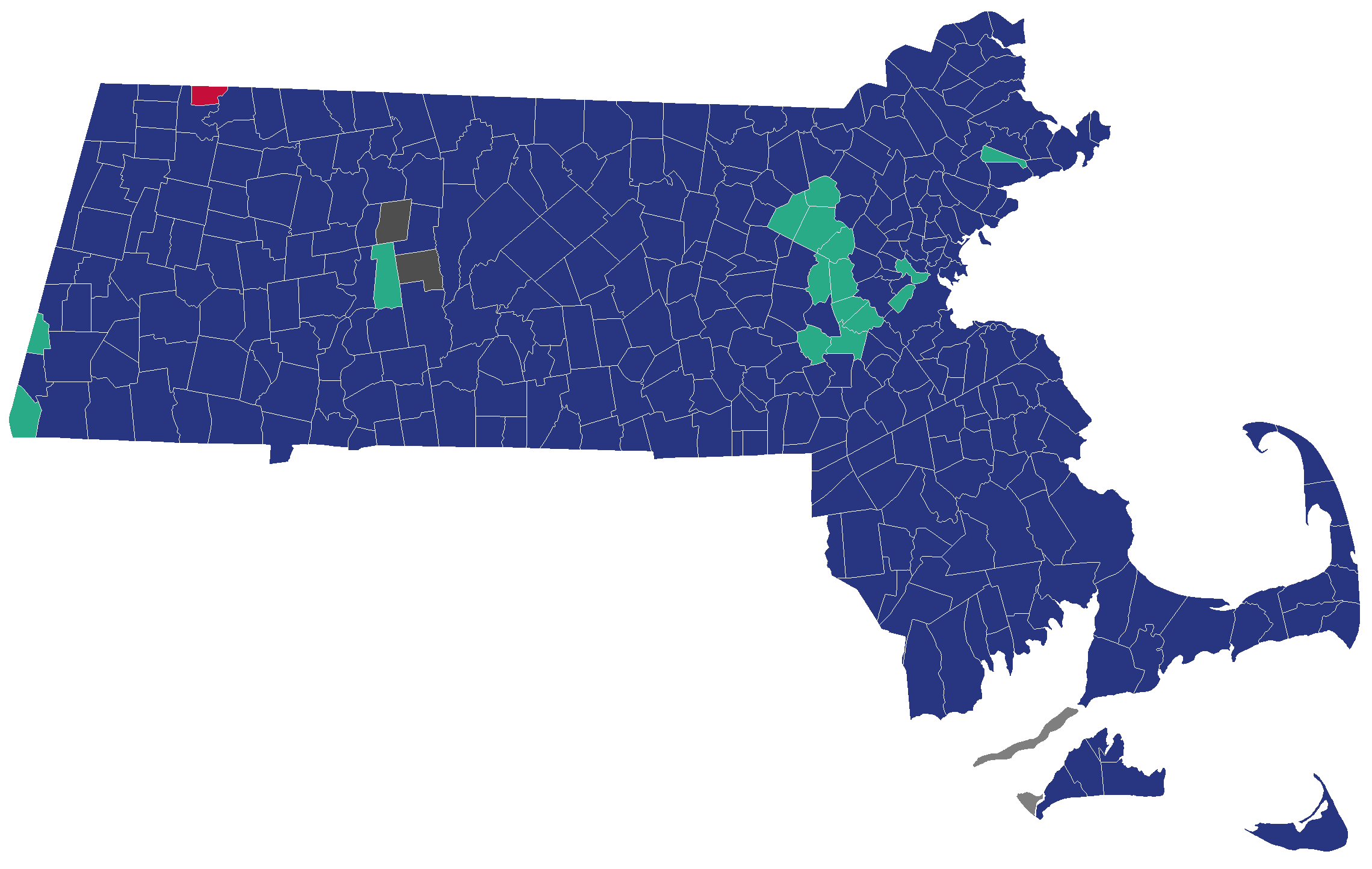
Town results of the Massachusetts Republican presidential primaries, 2016 Donald Trump John Kasich Marco Rubio Tie

Massachusetts Republican primary, March 1, 2016
Candidate	Votes	Percentage	Actual delegate count		
Candidate	Votes	Percentage	Bound	Unbound	Total
Donald Trump	312,425	48.99%	22	0	22
John Kasich	114,434	17.94%	8	0	8
Marco Rubio	113,170	17.75%	8	0	8
Ted Cruz	60,592	9.50%	4	0	4
Ben Carson	16,360	2.57%	0	0	0
Jeb Bush (withdrawn)	6,559	1.03%	0	0	0
No Preference	3,220	0.50%	0	0	0
Others	2,325	0.36%	0	0	0
Chris Christie (withdrawn)	1,906	0.30%	0	0	0
Rand Paul (withdrawn)	1,864	0.29%	0	0	0
Blank Votes	1,440	0.23%	0	0	0
Carly Fiorina (withdrawn)	1,153	0.18%	0	0	0
Jim Gilmore (withdrawn)	753	0.12%	0	0	0
Mike Huckabee (withdrawn)	709	0.11%	0	0	0
George Pataki (withdrawn)	500	0.08%	0	0	0
Rick Santorum (withdrawn)	293	0.05%	0	0	0
Unprojected delegates:			0	0	0
Total:	637,703	100.00%	42	0	42
Source: The Green Papers

=== Green-Rainbow primary ===
The Massachusetts primary took place on March 1. Five candidates appeared on the ballot; the results are as follows:

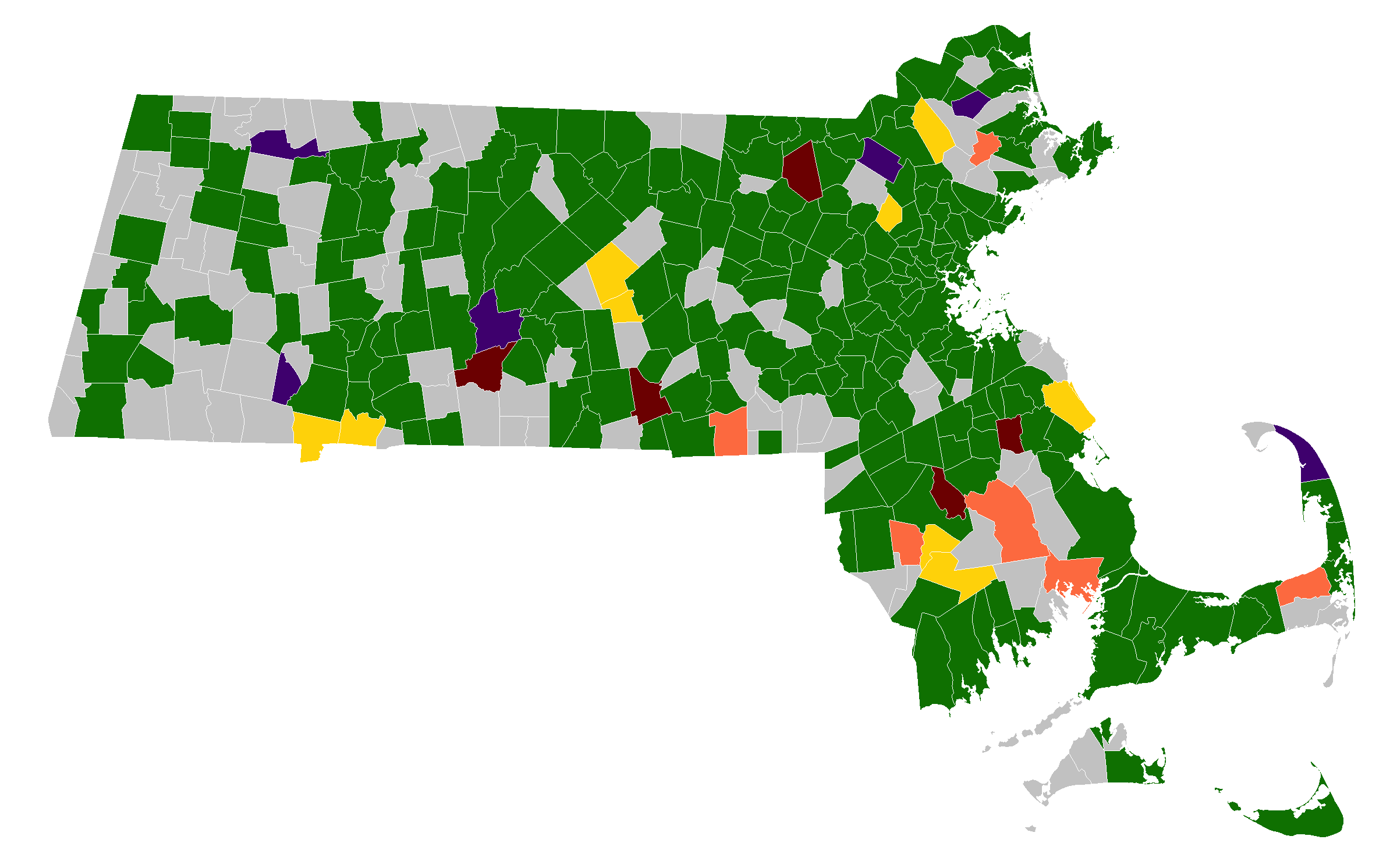
Town results of the Massachusetts Green presidential primaries, 2016. Jill Stein Sedinam Curry Darryl Cherney Kent Mesplay William Kreml No votes

Massachusetts Green Party presidential primary, March 1, 2016
Candidate	Votes	Percentage	National delegates
Jill Stein	768	45.7%	5
Sedinam Moyowasifza-Curry	78	4.7%	1
Darryl Cherney	54	3.2%	0
Kent Mesplay	37	2.2%	0
William Kreml	24	1.4%	0
Others	436	25.9%	4
No Preference	199	11.8%	4
Blank votes	85	5.0%	n/a
Total	1,681	100.00%	10

Any members of the party could apply to be delegates to be sent to the national convention, and had until March 10 (over a week after the primary) to apply. The number of voters that took part in the election slightly increased from the 1,554 that took part in the 2012 primary.

=== United Independent primary ===
Ballots were available for voters enrolled in this party, but there were no candidates for office.

== General election ==
=== Predictions ===
The following are final 2016 predictions from various organizations for Massachusetts as of Election Day.

Source	Ranking	As of
Los Angeles Times	Safe D	November 6, 2016
CNN	Safe D	November 4, 2016
Cook Political Report	Safe D	November 7, 2016
Electoral-vote.com	Safe D	November 8, 2016
Rothenberg Political Report	Safe D	November 7, 2016
Sabato's Crystal Ball	Safe D	November 7, 2016
RealClearPolitics	Safe D	November 8, 2016
Fox News	Safe D	November 7, 2016

=== Polling ===
Clinton won every single pre-election poll by upper double digits. The final poll showed Clinton with 56% to Trump's 26%, and the average of the final three polls showed Clinton leading Trump 56% to 27%.

=== Results ===
2016 United States presidential election in Massachusetts
Party	Candidate	Votes	%
Democratic	Hillary Clinton; Tim Kaine	1,995,196	60.01
Republican	Donald Trump; Mike Pence	1,090,893	32.81
Libertarian	Gary Johnson; Bill Weld	138,018	4.15
Green-Rainbow	Jill Stein; Ajamu Baraka	47,661	1.43
Independent	Evan McMullin (write-in); Nathan Johnson (write-in)	2,719	0.08
Independent	Laurence Kotlikoff (write-in); Edward Leamer (write-in)	28	0.00
Independent	William Feegbeh (write-in); Steve O'Brien (write-in)	28	0.00
Workers World	Monica Moorehead (write-in); Lamont Lilly (write-in)	15	0.00
Write-in		50,488	1.52
Total votes		3,325,046	100%
Democratic win			

==== By county ====
County	Hillary Clinton Democratic		Donald Trump Republican		Various candidates Other parties		Margin		Total votes cast
County	#	%	#	%	#	%	#	%	Total votes cast
Barnstable	72,430	53.34%	54,099	39.84%	9,252	6.82%	18,331	13.50%	135,781
Berkshire	43,714	66.62%	16,839	25.66%	5,064	7.72%	26,875	40.96%	65,617
Bristol	129,540	51.38%	105,443	41.82%	17,157	6.80%	24,097	9.56%	252,140
Dukes	8,400	71.95%	2,477	21.22%	797	6.83%	5,923	50.73%	11,674
Essex	222,310	57.69%	136,316	35.37%	26,744	6.94%	85,994	22.32%	385,370
Franklin	24,478	63.05%	10,364	26.70%	3,979	10.25%	14,114	36.35%	38,821
Hampden	112,590	54.63%	78,685	38.18%	14,826	7.19%	33,905	16.45%	206,101
Hampshire	55,367	65.76%	21,790	25.88%	7,036	8.36%	33,577	39.88%	84,193
Middlesex	520,360	65.31%	219,793	27.59%	56,582	7.10%	300,567	37.72%	796,735
Nantucket	4,146	63.71%	1,892	29.07%	470	7.22%	2,254	34.64%	6,508
Norfolk	221,819	60.33%	119,723	32.56%	26,153	7.11%	102,096	27.77%	367,695
Plymouth	135,513	49.97%	115,369	42.54%	20,295	7.49%	20,144	7.43%	271,177
Suffolk	245,751	78.44%	50,421	16.09%	17,111	5.47%	195,330	62.35%	313,283
Worcester	198,778	50.98%	157,682	40.44%	33,491	8.58%	41,096	10.54%	389,951
Totals	1,995,196	60.01%	1,090,893	32.81%	238,957	7.18%	904,303	27.20%	3,325,046

==== By municipality ====
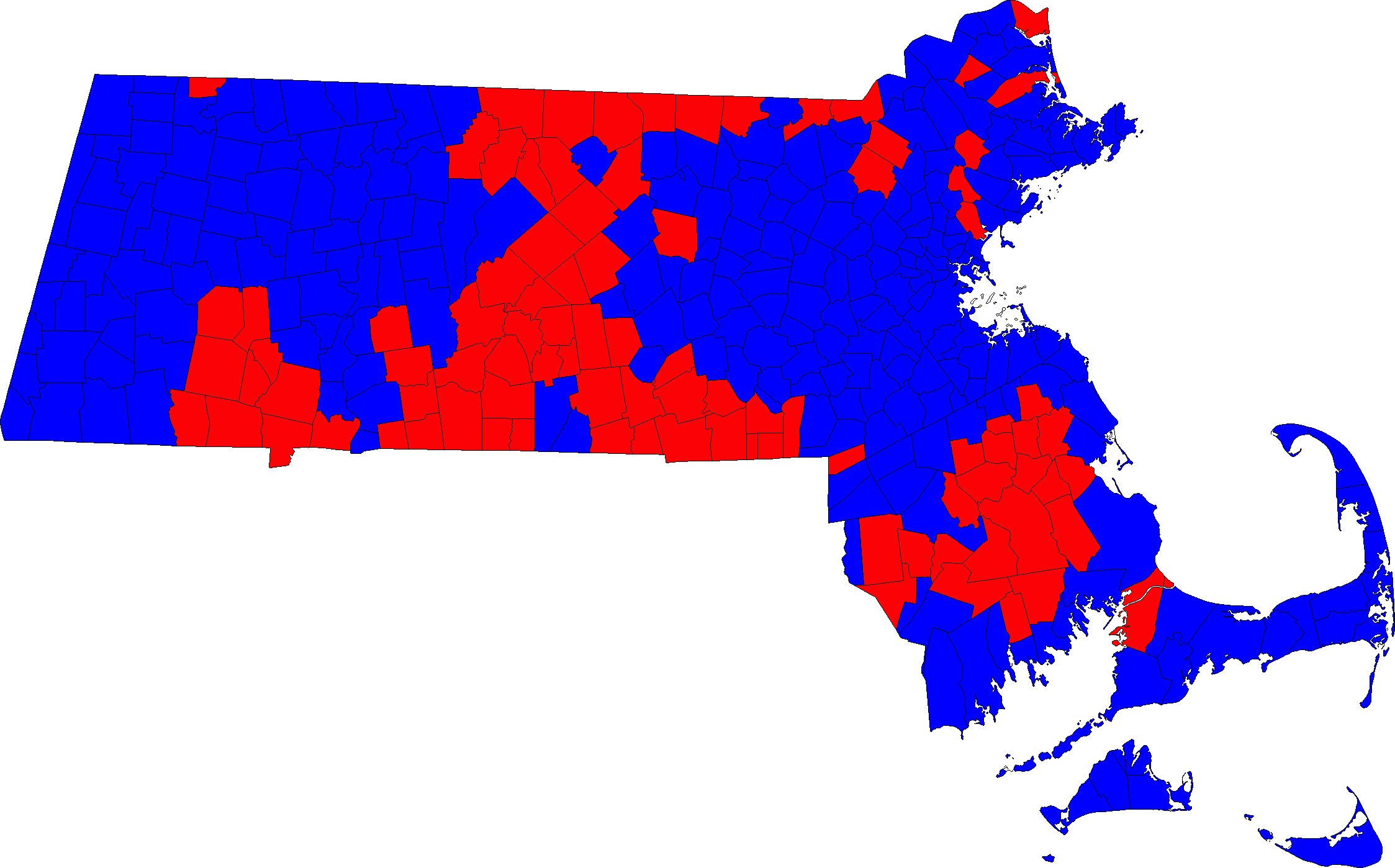
Results by municipality

City/town	Hillary Rodham Clinton Democratic		Donald Trump Republican		All other candidates various parties		Total votes counted
City/town	%	#	%	#	%	#	Total votes counted
Abington	46.2%	4,115	45.1%	4,017	8.8%	780	8,912
Acton	70.9%	9,198	19.7%	2,555	9.4%	1214	12,967
Acushnet	42.3%	2,401	50.0%	2,834	7.7%	437	5,672
Adams	59.1%	2,413	31.5%	1,285	9.4%	382	4,080
Agawam	41.7%	6,208	49.9%	7,421	8.4%	1248	14,877
Alford	73.6%	226	16.9%	52	9.4%	29	307
Amesbury	55.0%	5,174	34.4%	3,231	10.6%	997	9,402
Amherst	82.0%	12,357	8.3%	1,248	9.7%	1461	15,066
Andover	57.3%	11,222	33.3%	6,522	9.3%	1828	19,572
Aquinnah	80.8%	232	11.8%	34	7.3%	21	287
Arlington	75.3%	20,539	17.1%	4,652	7.6%	2080	27,271
Ashburnham	42.3%	1,439	44.8%	1,522	12.9%	438	3,399
Ashby	37.4%	722	50.4%	974	12.3%	237	1,933
Ashfield	72.4%	836	15.9%	184	11.7%	135	1,155
Ashland	60.9%	5,684	29.7%	2,768	9.4%	874	9,326
Athol	41.1%	2,076	46.2%	2,335	12.8%	645	5,056
Attleboro	50.4%	10,518	41.0%	8,571	8.6%	1792	20,881
Auburn	47.6%	4,496	42.3%	4,000	10.1%	959	9,455
Avon	49.9%	1,254	42.5%	1,068	7.6%	190	2,512
Ayer	51.8%	2,162	35.9%	1,498	12.4%	516	4,176
Barnstable	49.3%	13,005	42.4%	11,195	8.3%	2180	26,380
Barre	40.9%	1,201	48.7%	1,429	10.4%	306	2,936
Becket	54.5%	571	35.1%	368	10.3%	108	1,047
Bedford	63.0%	5,085	27.4%	2,211	9.5%	770	8,066
Belchertown	52.4%	4,408	37.5%	3,153	10.2%	857	8,418
Bellingham	44.9%	4,033	45.2%	4,059	9.9%	890	8,982
Belmont	69.8%	10,252	21.1%	3,106	9.1%	1333	14,691
Berkley	39.5%	1,455	52.4%	1,926	8.1%	298	3,679
Berlin	51.3%	1,009	37.9%	745	10.8%	212	1,966
Bernardston	57.2%	711	30.7%	382	12.1%	151	1,244
Beverly	58.8%	13,185	30.8%	6,904	10.4%	2324	22,413
Billerica	45.2%	10,100	46.2%	10,319	8.7%	1939	22,358
Blackstone	40.0%	1,850	50.3%	2,327	9.6%	446	4,623
Blandford	35.7%	256	56.5%	405	7.8%	56	717
Bolton	56.5%	1,891	31.0%	1,036	12.5%	418	3,345
Boston	79.7%	221,093	13.7%	38,087	6.6%	18186	277,366
Bourne	44.5%	4,910	47.1%	5,201	8.4%	924	11,035
Boxborough	64.7%	1,987	24.6%	756	10.6%	326	3,069
Boxford	47.1%	2,454	42.1%	2,194	10.8%	560	5,208
Boylston	49.8%	1,424	39.3%	1,125	10.9%	312	2,861
Braintree	50.8%	10,469	40.9%	8,427	8.4%	1730	20,626
Brewster	56.0%	3,813	34.8%	2,370	9.3%	632	6,815
Bridgewater	43.5%	5,718	47.6%	6,261	8.8%	1161	13,140
Brimfield	37.3%	793	52.4%	1,113	10.3%	220	2,126
Brockton	70.1%	25,593	24.1%	8,801	5.7%	2091	36,485
Brookfield	38.8%	708	51.2%	936	10.0%	183	1,827
Brookline	82.8%	24,583	10.7%	3,175	6.5%	1922	29,680
Buckland	65.9%	703	21.6%	230	12.6%	134	1,067
Burlington	53.7%	7,633	38.2%	5,434	8.1%	1152	14,219
Cambridge	87.4%	46,563	6.2%	3,323	6.4%	3396	53,282
Canton	55.5%	7,308	35.9%	4,731	8.6%	1131	13,170
Carlisle	67.9%	2,302	21.6%	732	10.5%	357	3,391
Carver	39.7%	2,529	50.4%	3,206	9.9%	632	6,367
Charlemont	55.4%	407	31.0%	228	13.6%	100	735
Charlton	36.9%	2,709	52.5%	3,856	10.6%	776	7,341
Chatham	51.6%	2,398	38.7%	1,796	9.7%	449	4,643
Chelmsford	52.4%	10,705	37.5%	7,661	10.2%	2076	20,442
Chelsea	74.8%	7,500	15.8%	1,587	9.4%	946	10,033
Cheshire	51.7%	978	39.2%	741	9.1%	172	1,891
Chester	34.2%	238	53.4%	372	12.4%	86	696
Chesterfield	51.8%	398	34.8%	267	13.4%	103	768
Chicopee	50.3%	12,338	40.1%	9,841	9.6%	2362	24,541
Chilmark	78.3%	617	11.9%	94	9.8%	77	788
Clarksburg	56.9%	510	36.5%	327	6.6%	59	896
Clinton	52.1%	3,767	38.0%	2,748	10.0%	722	7,237
Cohasset	57.4%	2,895	32.3%	1,629	10.2%	516	5,040
Colrain	54.9%	513	27.5%	257	17.6%	164	934
Concord	73.9%	8,460	17.0%	1,951	9.1%	1036	11,447
Conway	70.0%	865	20.2%	249	9.8%	121	1,235
Cummington	58.9%	334	27.5%	156	13.6%	77	567
Dalton	62.9%	2,190	27.0%	940	10.1%	353	3,483
Danvers	49.7%	7,752	41.5%	6,484	8.8%	1370	15,606
Dartmouth	51.7%	8,586	40.6%	6,738	7.7%	1279	16,603
Dedham	58.9%	8,621	32.7%	4,778	8.4%	1227	14,626
Deerfield	63.6%	1,968	25.1%	777	11.3%	350	3,095
Dennis	51.8%	4,887	39.8%	3,751	8.4%	794	9,432
Dighton	38.9%	1,602	52.1%	2,149	9.0%	371	4,122
Douglas	35.8%	1,780	54.0%	2,685	10.3%	510	4,975
Dover	56.2%	2,063	31.0%	1,137	12.9%	472	3,672
Dracut	40.4%	6,645	50.6%	8,319	9.0%	1473	16,437
Dudley	38.5%	2,113	52.3%	2,871	9.2%	503	5,487
Dunstable	46.9%	954	41.1%	837	12.0%	244	2,035
Duxbury	50.9%	5,137	38.5%	3,888	10.6%	1071	10,096
East Bridgewater	39.6%	3,174	50.8%	4,073	9.6%	768	8,015
East Brookfield	34.3%	417	54.6%	664	11.2%	136	1,217
East Longmeadow	43.8%	4,089	47.6%	4,441	8.6%	805	9,335
Eastham	59.5%	2,203	32.4%	1,199	8.1%	300	3,702
Easthampton	63.4%	6,213	26.5%	2,599	10.0%	984	9,796
Easton	50.4%	6,556	40.2%	5,231	9.4%	1224	13,011
Edgartown	63.6%	1,787	27.7%	779	8.7%	244	2,810
Egremont	73.5%	621	17.4%	147	9.1%	77	845
Erving	50.4%	420	36.0%	300	13.7%	114	834
Essex	55.2%	1,272	32.9%	758	11.9%	274	2,304
Everett	66.5%	9,461	27.7%	3,940	5.8%	822	14,223
Fairhaven	48.7%	4,264	43.7%	3,824	7.6%	665	8,753
Fall River	56.7%	17,467	35.2%	10,850	8.1%	2506	30,823
Falmouth	56.6%	11,467	35.3%	7,165	8.1%	1642	20,274
Fitchburg	54.8%	8,590	35.6%	5,587	9.6%	1502	15,679
Florida	47.8%	191	42.5%	170	9.8%	39	400
Foxborough	49.6%	5,132	40.2%	4,161	10.2%	1051	10,344
Framingham	68.3%	20,520	23.5%	7,063	8.1%	2445	30,028
Franklin	51.7%	9,527	38.0%	6,996	10.4%	1910	18,433
Freetown	40.1%	2,035	52.2%	2,649	7.7%	393	5,077
Gardner	47.9%	4,196	40.4%	3,542	11.7%	1024	8,762
Georgetown	46.0%	2,347	43.7%	2,228	10.3%	527	5,102
Gill	60.8%	579	27.2%	259	12.1%	115	953
Gloucester	58.7%	9,808	32.1%	5,355	9.2%	1545	16,708
Goshen	57.1%	364	33.4%	213	9.6%	61	638
Gosnold	50.7%	36	38.0%	27	11.3%	8	71
Grafton	52.2%	5,372	37.7%	3,883	10.0%	1032	10,287
Granby	44.1%	1,651	45.4%	1,699	10.5%	391	3,741
Granville	34.0%	335	55.6%	548	10.4%	103	986
Great Barrington	76.5%	2,880	15.4%	580	8.1%	304	3,764
Greenfield	64.1%	5,574	24.1%	2,098	11.8%	1025	8,697
Groton	57.5%	3,917	31.4%	2,138	11.1%	757	6,812
Groveland	44.2%	1,822	46.9%	1,934	8.9%	369	4,125
Hadley	64.9%	2,149	26.2%	867	9.0%	297	3,313
Halifax	39.7%	1,794	51.2%	2,312	9.1%	413	4,519
Hamilton	55.2%	2,631	31.0%	1,476	13.8%	655	4,762
Hampden	38.1%	1,188	52.8%	1,645	9.1%	284	3,117
Hancock	47.6%	189	40.1%	159	12.3%	49	397
Hanover	42.4%	3,750	48.3%	4,267	9.3%	821	8,838
Hanson	39.5%	2,432	50.7%	3,124	9.8%	602	6,158
Hardwick	40.0%	568	49.9%	709	10.1%	144	1,421
Harvard	66.6%	2,515	23.5%	889	9.9%	372	3,776
Harwich	53.2%	4,560	38.4%	3,294	8.4%	718	8,572
Hatfield	59.7%	1,284	30.7%	660	9.7%	208	2,152
Haverhill	51.1%	15,407	40.0%	12,050	8.9%	2672	30,129
Hawley	51.0%	105	32.5%	67	16.5%	34	206
Heath	53.2%	244	35.9%	165	10.9%	50	459
Hingham	57.3%	8,510	32.4%	4,810	10.3%	1535	14,855
Hinsdale	53.3%	606	35.5%	403	11.2%	127	1,136
Holbrook	50.2%	2,912	41.1%	2,385	8.7%	502	5,799
Holden	49.0%	5,605	40.3%	4,612	10.7%	1223	11,440
Holland	34.4%	475	52.1%	720	13.5%	186	1,381
Holliston	60.4%	5,291	29.2%	2,563	10.4%	913	8,767
Holyoke	68.4%	11,656	23.6%	4,022	8.0%	1361	17,039
Hopedale	50.1%	1,759	39.2%	1,375	10.7%	377	3,511
Hopkinton	57.4%	5,358	31.2%	2,911	11.4%	1067	9,336
Hubbardston	37.6%	1,040	49.8%	1,376	12.6%	349	2,765
Hudson	55.5%	6,028	34.7%	3,775	9.8%	1062	10,865
Hull	56.4%	3,688	36.0%	2,356	7.6%	499	6,543
Huntington	38.3%	460	50.9%	611	10.8%	130	1,201
Ipswich	55.8%	4,939	34.1%	3,013	10.1%	894	8,846
Kingston	44.9%	3,471	46.3%	3,579	8.8%	684	7,734
Lakeville	37.9%	2,466	51.9%	3,374	10.2%	664	6,504
Lancaster	46.1%	1,850	41.2%	1,651	12.7%	508	4,009
Lanesborough	57.1%	998	34.2%	597	8.7%	152	1,747
Lawrence	80.9%	19,852	14.4%	3,535	4.7%	1150	24,537
Lee	63.5%	1,969	27.5%	852	9.0%	278	3,099
Leicester	41.6%	2,423	48.5%	2,825	10.0%	580	5,828
Lenox	72.2%	2,234	18.5%	572	9.4%	290	3,096
Leominster	49.3%	9,840	41.1%	8,199	9.6%	1912	19,951
Leverett	76.9%	996	14.3%	185	8.9%	115	1,296
Lexington	74.8%	13,900	17.6%	3,279	7.6%	1412	18,591
Leyden	61.0%	306	27.7%	139	11.4%	57	502
Lincoln	75.7%	2,996	15.8%	625	8.5%	336	3,957
Littleton	57.4%	3,445	31.3%	1,876	11.3%	680	6,001
Longmeadow	55.1%	5,311	35.9%	3,457	9.0%	866	9,634
Lowell	63.1%	23,555	28.3%	10,584	8.6%	3207	37,346
Ludlow	42.9%	4,483	48.8%	5,097	8.2%	861	10,441
Lunenburg	45.7%	2,942	43.5%	2,802	10.8%	696	6,440
Lynn	64.8%	22,164	27.2%	9,311	7.9%	2714	34,189
Lynnfield	42.1%	3,238	49.8%	3,829	8.1%	626	7,693
Malden	68.9%	15,845	24.1%	5,538	7.0%	1612	22,995
Manchester-by-the-Sea	62.1%	2,249	26.3%	954	11.6%	420	3,623
Mansfield	51.6%	6,879	38.0%	5,073	10.4%	1389	13,341
Marblehead	61.6%	8,111	28.6%	3,759	9.8%	1288	13,158
Marion	56.0%	1,861	34.9%	1,159	9.1%	303	3,323
Marlborough	57.7%	10,577	32.5%	5,959	9.8%	1800	18,336
Marshfield	46.1%	7,343	45.3%	7,215	8.6%	1362	15,920
Mashpee	49.5%	4,448	42.7%	3,839	7.8%	697	8,984
Mattapoisett	49.3%	2,125	42.2%	1,820	8.6%	369	4,314
Maynard	63.4%	3,860	27.4%	1,671	9.2%	559	6,090
Medfield	56.5%	4,409	30.8%	2,400	12.7%	990	7,799
Medford	67.8%	20,690	25.1%	7,671	7.1%	2167	30,528
Medway	51.4%	4,009	37.8%	2,948	10.8%	843	7,800
Melrose	63.0%	10,687	28.5%	4,832	8.5%	1442	16,961
Mendon	42.7%	1,530	47.3%	1,694	10.0%	360	3,584
Merrimac	48.2%	1,895	41.2%	1,622	10.6%	418	3,935
Methuen	49.4%	11,662	43.4%	10,235	7.2%	1687	23,584
Middleborough	38.2%	4,837	52.0%	6,583	9.8%	1235	12,655
Middlefield	50.5%	155	37.5%	115	12.1%	37	307
Middleton	41.4%	2,159	51.1%	2,663	7.5%	389	5,211
Milford	53.3%	7,370	37.9%	5,237	8.8%	1219	13,826
Millbury	43.4%	3,162	47.3%	3,445	9.3%	681	7,288
Millis	51.9%	2,620	37.4%	1,890	10.7%	540	5,050
Millville	37.3%	624	52.3%	874	10.4%	174	1,672
Milton	65.7%	10,752	26.2%	4,286	8.1%	1324	16,362
Monroe	42.4%	25	44.1%	26	13.6%	8	59
Monson	41.1%	1,922	48.3%	2,259	10.7%	499	4,680
Montague	63.6%	2,858	24.4%	1,095	12.0%	538	4,491
Monterey	75.3%	417	15.9%	88	8.8%	49	554
Montgomery	37.5%	199	53.0%	281	9.4%	50	530
Mount Washington	71.0%	76	17.8%	19	11.2%	12	107
Nahant	56.6%	1,347	36.3%	864	7.0%	167	2,378
Nantucket	63.0%	4,146	28.7%	1,892	8.3%	545	6,583
Natick	66.8%	13,420	24.2%	4,870	9.0%	1807	20,097
Needham	69.3%	12,797	21.8%	4,019	9.0%	1656	18,472
New Ashford	62.7%	101	24.2%	39	13.0%	21	161
New Bedford	61.9%	20,812	30.7%	10,327	7.3%	2469	33,608
New Braintree	39.5%	246	52.3%	326	8.2%	51	623
New Marlborough	64.8%	564	25.0%	218	10.2%	89	871
New Salem	54.9%	337	33.9%	208	11.2%	69	614
Newbury	53.3%	2,465	37.1%	1,716	9.6%	442	4,623
Newburyport	63.8%	7,385	26.9%	3,114	9.4%	1085	11,584
Newton	76.8%	36,463	16.4%	7,764	6.8%	3242	47,469
Norfolk	48.1%	2,956	40.0%	2,458	11.9%	728	6,142
North Adams	63.4%	3,730	26.7%	1,570	9.8%	579	5,879
North Andover	51.9%	8,499	39.0%	6,391	9.2%	1501	16,391
North Attleborough	45.7%	7,059	43.5%	6,716	10.7%	1659	15,434
North Brookfield	35.0%	907	54.5%	1,413	10.5%	271	2,591
North Reading	46.8%	4,283	43.5%	3,986	9.7%	885	9,154
Northampton	79.5%	13,512	11.1%	1,878	9.4%	1605	16,995
Northborough	56.6%	5,130	32.7%	2,964	10.7%	972	9,066
Northbridge	40.7%	3,425	47.3%	3,977	12.0%	1005	8,407
Northfield	57.7%	1,013	30.3%	533	12.0%	211	1,757
Norton	45.4%	4,555	44.1%	4,428	10.5%	1058	10,041
Norwell	48.4%	3,277	41.9%	2,837	9.6%	652	6,766
Norwood	55.8%	9,000	35.3%	5,692	8.8%	1424	16,116
Oak Bluffs	68.8%	2,098	24.2%	738	7.0%	213	3,049
Oakham	36.7%	435	53.5%	633	9.8%	116	1,184
Orange	43.3%	1,487	45.1%	1,550	11.6%	398	3,435
Orleans	58.5%	2,687	32.9%	1,511	8.6%	397	4,595
Otis	46.6%	431	44.0%	407	9.3%	86	924
Oxford	39.1%	2,744	50.9%	3,576	10.0%	705	7,025
Palmer	40.0%	2,475	49.8%	3,083	10.3%	635	6,193
Paxton	44.8%	1,213	44.2%	1,197	11.0%	298	2,708
Peabody	50.4%	14,395	42.2%	12,036	7.4%	2118	28,549
Pelham	81.7%	748	10.7%	98	7.5%	69	915
Pembroke	43.6%	4,630	46.3%	4,913	10.1%	1073	10,616
Pepperell	42.8%	2,932	45.3%	3,098	11.9%	816	6,846
Peru	49.1%	255	39.9%	207	11.0%	57	519
Petersham	50.4%	417	37.7%	312	11.9%	98	827
Phillipston	36.3%	374	53.4%	550	10.3%	106	1,030
Pittsfield	67.9%	13,907	23.3%	4,771	8.8%	1800	20,478
Plainfield	62.8%	263	25.5%	107	11.7%	49	419
Plainville	44.5%	2,216	44.6%	2,223	10.9%	545	4,984
Plymouth	47.2%	15,602	43.3%	14,309	9.4%	3112	33,023
Plympton	40.2%	727	48.8%	883	11.0%	198	1,808
Princeton	50.4%	1,183	38.3%	898	11.3%	264	2,345
Provincetown	86.8%	2,082	8.7%	208	4.5%	109	2,399
Quincy	60.4%	25,477	31.6%	13,321	8.0%	3394	42,192
Randolph	74.7%	11,509	20.1%	3,098	5.2%	799	15,406
Raynham	42.6%	3,327	48.7%	3,806	8.7%	681	7,814
Reading	56.7%	8,848	34.4%	5,373	8.9%	1384	15,605
Rehoboth	39.9%	2,784	51.2%	3,574	8.9%	619	6,977
Revere	59.6%	11,964	34.3%	6,895	6.1%	1222	20,081
Richmond	70.2%	706	21.7%	218	8.1%	81	1,005
Rochester	39.8%	1,368	50.8%	1,743	9.4%	323	3,434
Rockland	46.1%	4,403	45.1%	4,313	8.8%	845	9,561
Rockport	62.7%	3,122	27.6%	1,371	9.7%	483	4,976
Rowe	50.6%	122	41.1%	99	8.3%	20	241
Rowley	43.0%	1,679	46.3%	1,809	10.7%	417	3,905
Royalston	44.7%	314	45.7%	321	9.5%	67	702
Russell	32.8%	278	56.6%	480	10.6%	90	848
Rutland	40.9%	2,022	47.4%	2,344	11.8%	582	4,948
Salem	67.4%	14,950	24.6%	5,458	8.0%	1775	22,183
Salisbury	43.6%	2,098	46.8%	2,249	9.6%	463	4,810
Sandisfield	52.0%	254	38.9%	190	9.0%	44	488
Sandwich	46.6%	6,017	45.2%	5,846	8.2%	1060	12,923
Saugus	43.4%	6,385	49.6%	7,305	7.0%	1028	14,718
Savoy	45.9%	184	40.6%	163	13.5%	54	401
Scituate	53.8%	6,512	36.8%	4,457	9.5%	1146	12,115
Seekonk	46.5%	3,663	45.3%	3,572	8.2%	642	7,877
Sharon	68.6%	7,219	23.2%	2,447	8.2%	862	10,528
Sheffield	64.0%	1,242	27.3%	530	8.8%	170	1,942
Shelburne	68.6%	821	19.2%	230	12.2%	146	1,197
Sherborn	64.9%	1,766	22.7%	617	12.5%	340	2,723
Shirley	47.4%	1,637	41.5%	1,432	11.0%	381	3,450
Shrewsbury	55.3%	10,620	35.4%	6,808	9.3%	1779	19,207
Shutesbury	76.4%	980	11.1%	142	12.5%	160	1,282
Somerset	47.7%	4,901	44.4%	4,566	7.9%	810	10,277
Somerville	82.5%	33,740	10.1%	4,128	7.4%	3006	40,874
South Hadley	55.8%	5,208	34.8%	3,254	9.4%	876	9,338
Southampton	45.4%	1,744	44.1%	1,692	10.5%	405	3,841
Southborough	58.0%	3,530	31.2%	1,898	10.8%	655	6,083
Southbridge	53.2%	3,714	37.0%	2,586	9.8%	681	6,981
Southwick	34.9%	1,859	55.6%	2,961	9.5%	507	5,327
Spencer	38.6%	2,265	51.8%	3,045	9.6%	565	5,875
Springfield	73.1%	40,341	20.4%	11,231	6.5%	3614	55,186
Sterling	42.7%	2,162	45.9%	2,327	11.4%	577	5,066
Stockbridge	73.9%	965	19.3%	252	6.7%	88	1,305
Stoneham	52.4%	6,962	39.4%	5,243	8.2%	1088	13,293
Stoughton	58.1%	8,451	33.8%	4,920	8.1%	1177	14,548
Stow	60.4%	2,708	28.1%	1,261	11.5%	518	4,487
Sturbridge	45.9%	2,534	43.7%	2,415	10.4%	573	5,522
Sudbury	67.7%	7,402	22.9%	2,510	9.4%	1028	10,940
Sunderland	69.5%	1,353	19.9%	387	10.7%	208	1,948
Sutton	40.2%	2,312	50.1%	2,881	9.7%	555	5,748
Swampscott	62.5%	5,554	29.1%	2,586	8.4%	745	8,885
Swansea	44.3%	3,928	49.0%	4,351	6.7%	594	8,873
Taunton	50.5%	12,365	40.7%	9,973	8.8%	2142	24,480
Templeton	37.5%	1,521	51.0%	2,068	11.6%	469	4,058
Tewksbury	43.2%	7,602	47.9%	8,432	8.9%	1574	17,608
Tisbury	73.2%	1,942	17.9%	476	8.9%	236	2,654
Tolland	31.7%	101	59.6%	190	8.8%	28	319
Topsfield	49.8%	2,100	37.2%	1,566	13.0%	548	4,214
Townsend	39.8%	2,082	48.8%	2,550	11.4%	598	5,230
Truro	68.9%	1,095	22.7%	361	8.4%	133	1,589
Tyngsborough	44.7%	3,061	46.3%	3,167	9.0%	617	6,845
Tyringham	67.2%	201	23.4%	70	9.4%	28	299
Upton	49.1%	2,296	38.9%	1,818	12.0%	562	4,676
Uxbridge	41.9%	3,266	47.4%	3,698	10.7%	834	7,798
Wakefield	52.4%	8,294	38.3%	6,060	9.3%	1464	15,818
Wales	35.9%	365	54.1%	550	10.0%	102	1,017
Walpole	49.0%	7,270	40.8%	6,046	10.2%	1512	14,828
Waltham	64.9%	17,355	28.4%	7,592	6.7%	1782	26,729
Ware	40.9%	1,853	48.3%	2,189	10.9%	494	4,536
Wareham	47.1%	5,435	44.3%	5,104	8.6%	994	11,533
Warren	37.5%	904	52.5%	1,266	10.0%	242	2,412
Warwick	57.2%	271	30.0%	142	12.9%	61	474
Washington	66.4%	217	27.2%	89	6.4%	21	327
Watertown	70.5%	13,166	21.1%	3,941	8.4%	1561	18,668
Wayland	71.0%	6,114	19.6%	1,684	9.4%	810	8,608
Webster	42.1%	3,119	48.2%	3,575	9.7%	717	7,411
Wellesley	69.2%	10,568	21.2%	3,235	9.6%	1463	15,266
Wellfleet	68.1%	1,554	22.6%	515	9.3%	213	2,282
Wendell	68.0%	402	17.6%	104	14.4%	85	591
Wenham	55.2%	1,368	31.2%	774	13.6%	336	2,478
West Boylston	48.3%	2,136	41.6%	1,838	10.1%	448	4,422
West Bridgewater	38.5%	1,623	51.1%	2,150	10.4%	438	4,211
West Brookfield	41.4%	869	48.1%	1,008	10.5%	220	2,097
West Newbury	54.2%	1,620	34.1%	1,020	11.6%	348	2,988
West Springfield	46.0%	5,711	44.6%	5,537	9.5%	1180	12,428
West Stockbridge	73.1%	659	19.8%	178	7.1%	64	901
West Tisbury	77.0%	1,688	15.0%	329	8.0%	175	2,192
Westborough	61.6%	6,023	28.2%	2,752	10.2%	1001	9,776
Westfield	42.6%	8,225	46.7%	9,021	10.7%	2060	19,306
Westford	55.8%	7,854	33.4%	4,706	10.7%	1511	14,071
Westhampton	55.4%	629	35.9%	408	8.7%	99	1,136
Westminster	42.4%	1,958	46.8%	2,165	10.8%	500	4,623
Weston	65.2%	4,368	24.6%	1,648	10.2%	680	6,696
Westport	46.9%	4,383	45.9%	4,285	7.2%	675	9,343
Westwood	56.0%	5,319	33.9%	3,218	10.1%	957	9,494
Weymouth	51.6%	15,398	40.1%	11,983	8.3%	2486	29,867
Whately	56.5%	582	31.8%	328	11.7%	120	1,030
Whitman	42.1%	3,393	47.3%	3,815	10.6%	853	8,061
Wilbraham	43.5%	3,744	46.6%	4,010	10.0%	858	8,612
Williamsburg	70.4%	1,207	20.2%	347	9.3%	160	1,714
Williamstown	80.5%	2,916	13.2%	478	6.3%	229	3,623
Wilmington	45.6%	6,205	45.4%	6,167	9.0%	1223	13,595
Winchendon	38.7%	1,789	50.1%	2,312	11.2%	517	4,618
Winchester	62.1%	8,062	28.5%	3,701	9.4%	1225	12,988
Windsor	58.4%	313	29.7%	159	11.9%	64	536
Winthrop	53.4%	5,194	39.6%	3,852	7.0%	681	9,727
Woburn	52.2%	10,915	39.9%	8,342	7.8%	1633	20,890
Worcester	65.0%	43,084	26.7%	17,732	8.3%	5487	66,303
Worthington	56.4%	430	30.0%	229	13.6%	104	763
Wrentham	44.9%	3,052	44.0%	2,993	11.2%	759	6,804
Yarmouth	51.1%	7,304	40.9%	5,848	7.9%	1135	14,287

==== By congressional district ====
Clinton won all nine congressional districts.

District	Clinton	Trump	Representative
1st	56%	36%	Richard Neal
2nd	55%	36%	Jim McGovern
3rd	57%	35%	Niki Tsongas
4th	58%	34%	Joe Kennedy III
5th	68%	25%	Katherine Clark
6th	55%	38%	Seth Moulton
7th	83%	12%	Mike Capuano
8th	59%	34%	Stephen Lynch
9th	52%	41%	William R. Keating

== See also ==
- United States presidential elections in Massachusetts
- 2016 Democratic Party presidential debates and forums
- 2016 Democratic Party presidential primaries
- 2016 Green Party presidential primaries
- 2016 Republican Party presidential debates and forums
- 2016 Republican Party presidential primaries
