= Hampshire High School =

Hampshire High School is the name of high schools in several U.S. states:

- Hampshire High School (Illinois), Hampshire, Illinois
- Hampshire High School (West Virginia), Romney, West Virginia
- Hampshire Regional High School, Westhampton, Massachusetts
