= Max Weir =

American baseball coach

Current position
- Title: Head coach
- Team: UMass
- Conference: MAC
- Record: 18–29

Coaching career (HC unless noted)
- 2017–2021: American International College (assistant)
- 2021–2022: Gardner-Webb (head development team)
- 2022–2023: UMass (assistant)
- 2023–2024: Nichols College (associate head coach)
- 2025: UMass (assistant)
- 2026: UMass (co-interim HC)
- 2027–present: UMass

Head coaching record
- Overall: 18–29

Max Weir is an American college baseball coach and former player. Weir is the head coach of the UMass Minutemen baseball team.

== Playing career ==
Weir played high school baseball at Hampshire Regional High School. In 2015, the Hampshire Regional baseball team reached the Western Massachusetts championship game. He did not play baseball after high school.

== Coaching career ==
Weir coached at American International College for four years, serving as an assistant baseball coach.

Prior to joining UMass, Weir was the head development team coach at Gardner-Webb University. He joined Gardner-Webb in October 2021.

For the 2022-23 season, Weir was an assistant coach for the UMass baseball team. At UMass, he primarily worked with catchers and hitters.

In the summer of 2023, Weir joined Nichols College as an associate head coach. Weir spent one year (2023–24) as the associate head coach at Nichols College at the NCAA Division III level of college baseball. He helped the Nichols Bison to a 29-13 overall record.

Weir returned to UMass in August 2024 as an assistant coach for the 2025 season.

On August 19, 2025, Weir was named as co-acting head coach of the UMass Minutemen baseball team alongside Brandon Shileikis.

On May 27, 2026, Weir was officially named the new head coach of UMass.

== Personal life ==
Weir is a native of Southampton, Massachusetts. He is a graduate of Hampshire Regional High School.

== See also ==
- List of current NCAA Division I baseball coaches
