= Nancy Conz =

American long-distance runner

Nancy Conz (May 1, 1957 in Southampton, Massachusetts – February 8, 2017 in Southampton) was an American long-distance runner and "pioneer" marathoner.

== Early life ==
Conz grew up in Southampton, Massachusetts. In 1975, Conz graduated from Hampshire Regional High School in Massachusetts.

== Career ==
Conz held four American long-distance running records set in the early 1980s. Three of those records: 15,000 meters, 10 miles and the one hour run, were set in one track race at the University of Massachusetts in Amherst, Massachusetts on June 25, 1981, but these three all were broken by Molly Huddle in a 1 November 2020 event.

In 1980, Conz won her first attempt at the marathon in the Five College Marathon in South Hadley, Massachusetts. This was a qualifier for the marathon in London, England. In August 1980, Conz ran her first international race and won second place at the Avon International Marathon for Women in London, England. Conz wore bib number 184. Conz finished in 2:36:02, and it was also the #2 time in the world that year. She returned the following year to win Avon, this time in Ottawa, beating her friend and future, winning the first ever women's Olympic gold medalist in the marathon, Joan Benoit. She also won Freihofer's Run for Women that same year. In 1982, she won the Chicago Marathon with a personal best of 2:33:22.

Nancy was a great runner. She came onto the scene rather quickly, and climbed quickly as well. She was a real tenacious runner. She gave it everything she had. She beat me several times when we went head to head. She was tenacious and worked very hard.

— Joan Benoit Samuelson

Conz was self-coached, her only previous coaching came from her days at Hampshire Regional High School.

== Personal life ==
In 1979, Conz married Paul Conz, a former blues drummer. They have two children, Derek Conz and Jarryd Conz.

On February 8, 2017, Conz died in Southampton, Massachusetts, after a near 20-year battle with adenoid cystic carcinoma, at the age of 59.
