= Westhampton =

Westhampton or Westampton may refer to a community in the United States:

- Westhampton, Massachusetts
- Westhampton, New York
- Westampton Township, New Jersey
