= Chesterfield, Massachusetts =

Town in Massachusetts, United States

- Town
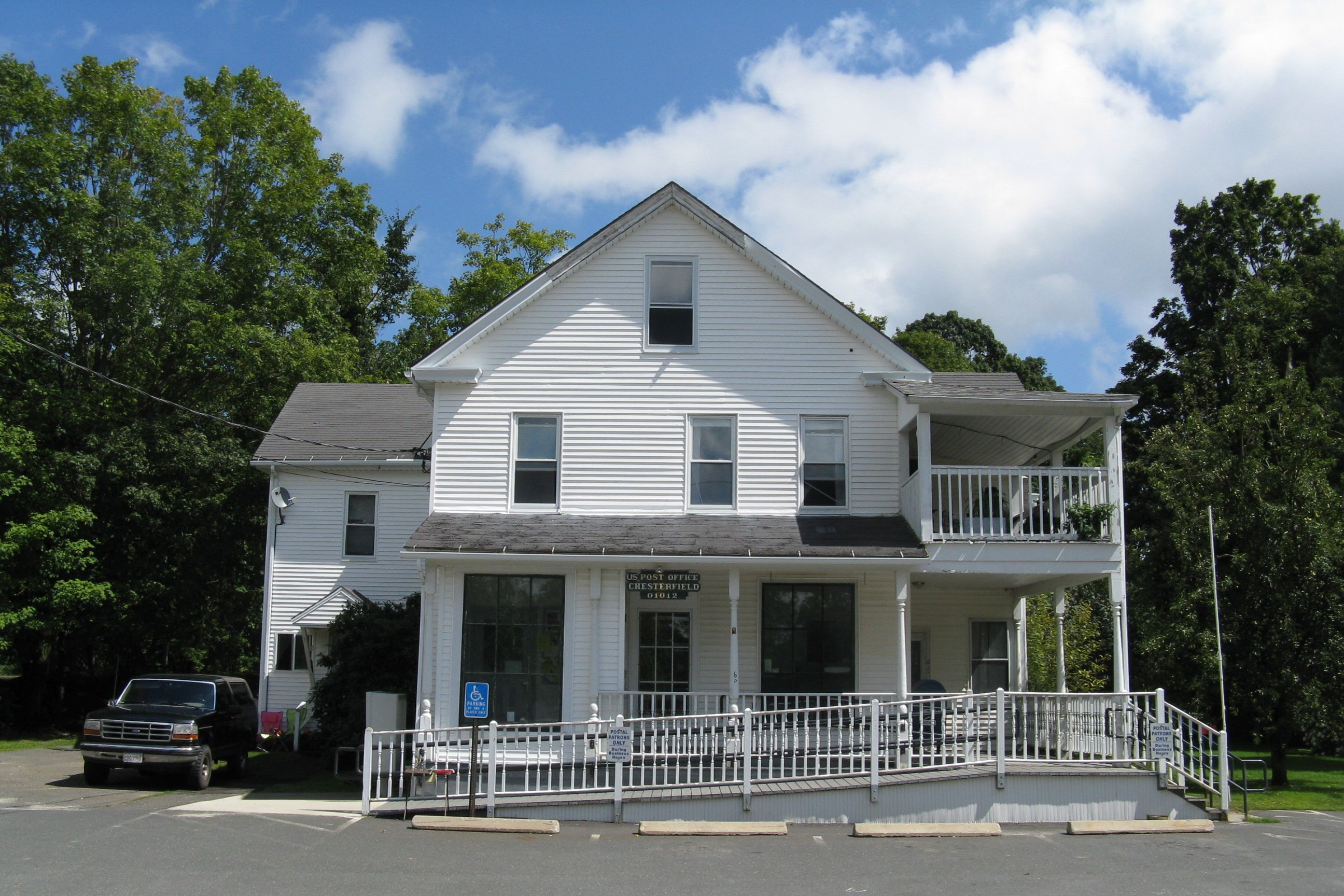
- Chesterfield Post Office

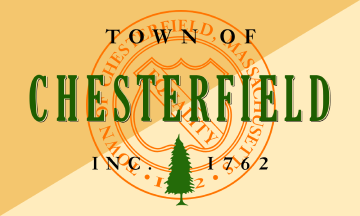
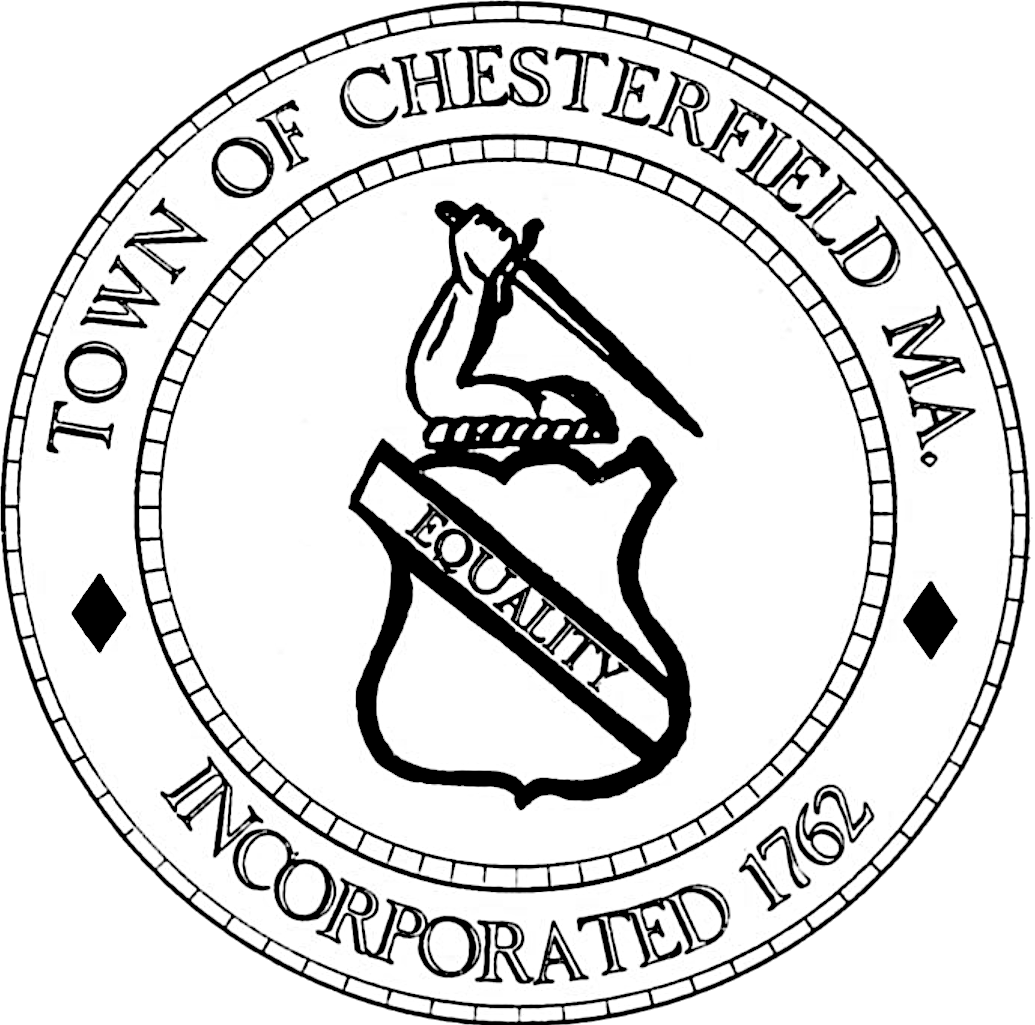
- Flag Seal

- Location in Hampshire County in Massachusetts
- Coordinates: 42°23′30″N 72°50′25″W
- Country: United States
- State: Massachusetts
- County: Hampshire
- Settled: 1760
- Incorporated: 1762

Government
  - Type: Open town meeting

Area
  - Total: 31.2 sq mi (80.9 km^{2})
  - Land: 30.8 sq mi (79.9 km^{2})
  - Water: 0.39 sq mi (1.0 km^{2})
- Elevation: 1,394 ft (425 m)

Population (2020)
  - Total: 1,186
  - Density: 38.4/sq mi (14.8/km^{2})
- Time zone: UTC−5 (Eastern)
  - Summer (DST): UTC−4 (Eastern)
- ZIP Codes: 01012 (Chesterfield); 01084 (West Chesterfield); 01026 (Cummington); 01096 (Williamsburg)
- Area code: 413
- FIPS code: 25-13590
- GNIS feature ID: 0618197
- Website: www.townofchesterfieldma.com

Chesterfield is a rural hill town in Hampshire County, Massachusetts, United States, 26 miles (42 km) east of Pittsfield, 75 miles (120 km) west of Worcester, and 90 miles (140 km) west of Boston. The population was 1,186 at the 2020 census. It is part of the Springfield, Massachusetts Metropolitan Statistical Area.

== History ==
Chesterfield was first settled in 1760 and was officially incorporated in 1762. It was named after the Earl of Chesterfield. The town center, established after the Revolution, has well-preserved Federal period houses along Main Road. In its early days, the town supported a largely agricultural economy, with wool from Merino sheep as a major product. However, there were sawmills and tanneries in operation as well as cloth dressing mills, and in the early 19th century these superseded farming and brought in a small immigrant population that was mostly Irish. Progress wiped out most of the industry in Chesterfield, and by the start of the 20th century a re-emerging agricultural economy developed alongside the growing trade from summer residents.

== Geography ==
According to the United States Census Bureau, the town has a total area of 31.2 square miles (80.9 km^{2}), of which 30.8 square miles (79.9 km^{2}) are land and 0.4 square miles (1.0 km^{2}), or 1.27%, are water. Chesterfield's location is nearly equidistant from the northern, southern and western state lines of Massachusetts.

Chesterfield is located in the Hilltowns region of Massachusetts, 52 miles (84 km) north of Hartford, Connecticut, 108 miles (174 km) west of Boston, 30 miles (48 km) northwest of Springfield, 75 miles (120 km) west of Worcester, 64 miles (103 km) southeast of Albany, New York, 26 miles (42 km) east of Pittsfield, and 160 miles (260 km) northeast of New York City.

== Education ==
Chesterfield is part of the Hampshire Regional School District along with Goshen, Southampton, Westhampton, and Williamsburg. Students attend K–6 at New Hingham Regional Elementary School along with Goshen, and 7–12 students attend Hampshire Regional High School.

== Points of interest ==
- Chesterfield Gorge along the Westfield River, a property of the Trustees of Reservations
- Indian Hollow (Massachusetts)

== Demographics ==
Historical population
Year	Pop.	±%
1790	1,183	—
1820	1,447	+22.3%
1850	1,014	−29.9%
1860	897	−11.5%
1870	811	−9.6%
1880	769	−5.2%
1890	608	−20.9%
1900	611	+0.5%
1910	536	−12.3%
1920	441	−17.7%
1930	420	−4.8%
1940	422	+0.5%
1950	496	+17.5%
1960	556	+12.1%
1970	704	+26.6%
1980	1,000	+42.0%
1990	1,048	+4.8%
2000	1,201	+14.6%
2010	1,222	+1.7%
2020	1,186	−2.9%
2022*	1,175	−0.9%
* = population estimate.

At the 2000 census, there were 1,201 people, 447 households and 324 families residing in the town. The population density was 38.6 inhabitants per square mile (14.90/km^{2}). There were 524 housing units at an average density of 16.8 per square mile (6.5/km^{2}). The racial makeup of the town was 98.67% White, 0.25% Asian, 0.25% Pacific Islander, 0.08% from other races, and 0.75% from two or more races. Hispanic or Latino of any race were 0.08% of the population.

There were 447 households, of which 34.0% had children under the age of 18 living with them, 60.6% were married couples living together, 7.8% had a female householder with no husband present, and 27.3% were non-families. Of all households, 18.8% were made up of individuals, and 6.5% had someone living alone who was 65 years of age or older. The average household size was 2.69 and the average family size was 3.09.

Of the population 25.7% were under the age of 18, 6.1% from 18 to 24, 29.8% from 25 to 44, 28.6% from 45 to 64, and 9.7% who were 65 years of age or older. The median age was 54 years. For every 100 females, there were 99.5 males. For every 100 females age 18 and over, there were 96.0 males.

The median household income was $49,063 and the median family income was $57,361. Males had a median income of $35,417 versus $27,788 for females. The per capita income for the town was $19,220. About 3.4% of families and 5.7% of the population were below the poverty line, including 5.7% of those under age 18 and 3.4% of those age 65 or over.
