= Baker, Missouri =

- Village
- Location of Baker, Missouri
- Coordinates: 36°46′25″N 89°45′41″W
- Country: United States
- State: Missouri
- County: Stoddard

Area
  - Total: 0.20 sq mi (0.53 km^{2})
  - Land: 0.20 sq mi (0.53 km^{2})
  - Water: 0 sq mi (0.00 km^{2})
- Elevation: 292 ft (89 m)

Population (2020)
  - Total: 3
  - Density: 14.6/sq mi (5.64/km^{2})
- Time zone: UTC-6 (Central (CST))
  - Summer (DST): UTC-5 (CDT)
- FIPS code: 29-03034
- GNIS feature ID: 2398019

Baker is a village in Stoddard County, Missouri, United States. Per the 2020 census, the population was 3. As of 2017, it is Missouri's smallest incorporated settlement.

== Geography ==
Baker is located on the Castor River along Missouri Route HH, approximately 10 miles east of Dexter and 11 miles southwest of Sikeston.

According to the United States Census Bureau, the village has a total area of 0.21 square miles (0.54 km^{2}), all land.

Baker and Goshen, Massachusetts are the only two towns or villages in the United States within 29 miles of four different states. Baker is 28.6 miles from Arkansas, 28.2 miles from Illinois, 23 miles from Tennessee, and 18 miles from Kentucky.

== Demographics ==
Historical population
Census	Pop.	Note	%±
1960	114		—
1970	72		−36.8%
1980	31		−56.9%
1990	8		−74.2%
2000	5		−37.5%
2010	3		−40.0%
2020	3		0.0%
U.S. Decennial Census; 2010 2020

=== 2020 census ===
Baker village, Missouri – Racial and ethnic composition Note: the US Census treats Hispanic/Latino as an ethnic category. This table excludes Latinos from the racial categories and assigns them to a separate category. Hispanics/Latinos may be of any race.
Race / Ethnicity (NH = Non-Hispanic)	Pop 2010	Pop 2020	% 2010	% 2020
White alone (NH)	3	2	100.00%	66.67%
Black or African American alone (NH)	0	0	0.00%	0.00%
Native American or Alaska Native alone (NH)	0	0	0.00%	0.00%
Asian alone (NH)	0	0	0.00%	0.00%
Pacific Islander alone (NH)	0	0	0.00%	0.00%
Some Other Race alone (NH)	0	0	0.00%	0.00%
Mixed Race orMulti-Racial (NH)	0	0	0.00%	0.00%
Hispanic or Latino (any race)	0	1	0.00%	33.33%
Total	3	3	100.00%	100.00%

Note: the US Census treats Hispanic/Latino as an ethnic category. This table excludes Latinos from the racial categories and assigns them to a separate category. Hispanics/Latinos can be of any race.

=== 2010 census ===
As of the census of 2010, there were 3 people, 1 household, and 1 family residing in the village. The population density was 14.3 inhabitants per square mile (5.5/km^{2}). There were 2 housing units at an average density of 9.5 per square mile (3.7/km^{2}). The racial makeup of the village was 100.0% White.

There was 1 household, of which 100.0% were married couples living together. 0.0% of all households were made up of individuals. The average household size was 3.00 and the average family size was 3.00.

The median age in the village was 60.5 years. 0.0% of residents were under the age of 18; 0.0% were between the ages of 18 and 24; 33.3% were from 25 to 44; 33.3% were from 45 to 64; and 33.3% were 65 years of age or older. The gender makeup of the village was 66.7% male and 33.3% female.

=== 2000 census ===
As of the census of 2000, there were 5 people, 2 households, and 1 family residing in the village. The population density was 24.1 inhabitants per square mile (9.3/km^{2}). There were 2 housing units at an average density of 9.7 per square mile (3.7/km^{2}). The racial makeup of the village was 100.00% White.

There were two households, neither of which had children under the age of 18 living with them, one of which was a married couple living together, and one of which was a non-family. One household was made up of an individual living alone who was 65 years of age or older. The average household size was 2.50 and the average family size was 4.00.

The age distribution was one person aged 19, one between 20 and 24, two persons between 45 and 54, and one person between 65 and 74 years of age. The median age was 47.5 years. There were three female inhabitants and two male inhabitants. All five residents were 18 years or older.

The median income for a household and a family in the village was $177,361. Males had a median income of $100,000 versus $79,631 for females. The per capita income for the village was $182,000. The single family was not below the poverty line.

== Education ==
It is in the Richland R-I School District.
