= Eliza A. Pittsinger =

American poet

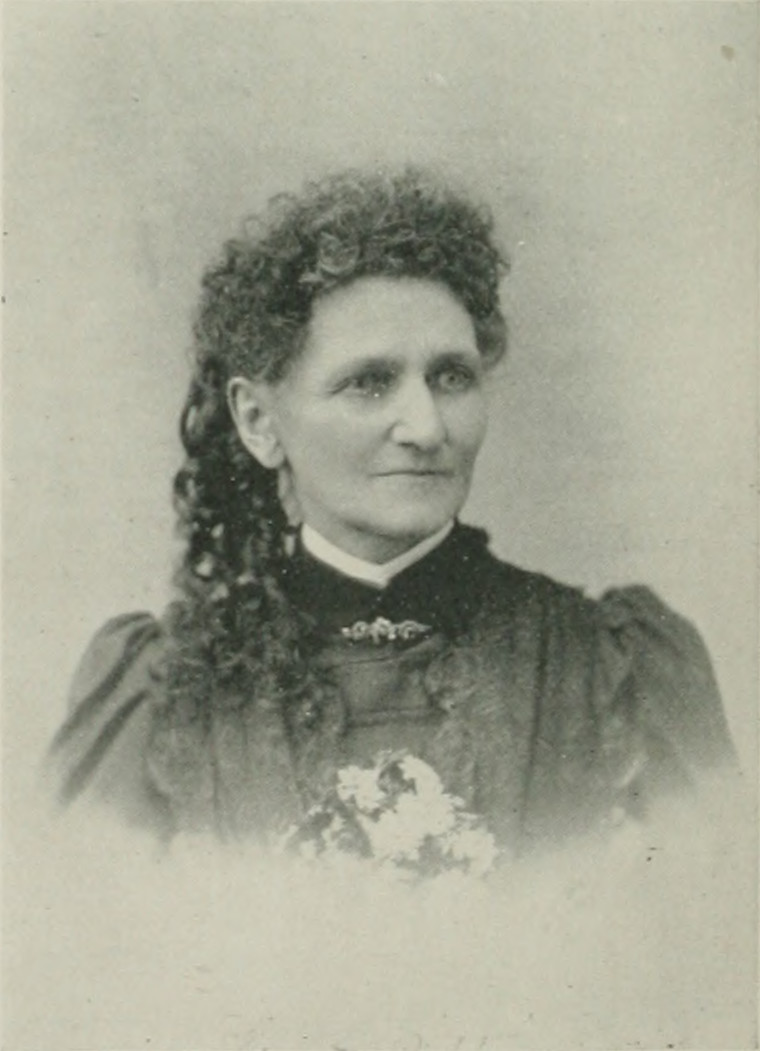
- Photo in A Woman of the Century
- Born: March 18, 1837; Westhampton, Massachusetts, U.S.
- Died: February 22, 1908 (aged 70); San Francisco, California, U.S.
- Occupation: poet
- Writing career
- Language: English
- Notable work: "Song of the Soul Victorious"

Eliza A. Pittsinger (March 18, 1837 - February 22, 1908), known as "The California Poetess", was an American poet of the long nineteenth century. She was born in Massachusetts and came to California from her home in Chesterfield in 1852, making the voyage around Cape Horn. At the outbreak of the American Civil War, she devoted her whole energies for a time toward molding the public sentiment for The Union. After a visit home to Massachusetts, she was married, but her life proving unhappy, she was soon divorced. When she again returned to California, she began writing for different papers, taking a deep interest in spiritualistic investigations and phenomena. She was a regular contributor to the Golden Era, the Carrier Dove, and the Banner of Light. What she considered her greatest poem, "Song of the Soul Victorious", was a treatment of the eternity of life, one of her favorite themes. Although Pittsinger wrote some very popular verses, she became obscure later in life.

== Early life and education ==
Eliza Ann Pittsinger was born in Westhampton, Massachusetts, March 18, 1837. Her father was of German descent. Her mother was of Anglo-American birth and blended unusual personal attractions with a nature bold and aspiring.

The mother's death occurred at the age of 32, leaving Pittsinger with two brothers and two sisters to the care and guidance of an older sister, a girl of 14, who thus acted in the double capacity of mother and sister. The father, deeply suffering from his bereavement, became negligent of his business matters, so that his circumstances and means of supporting his family were greatly reduced. Pittsinger early exhibited a disposition impulsive, daring, precocious; she cherished an unusual desire for knowledge of all kinds, and availed herself of all educational opportunities.

At the age of 14, she took charge of the house for her father, two brothers, and a sister, and walked 1 mile (1.6 km) to teach a school; and at the same time instructed at home a younger brother and sister. At 16, she was teacher of a school in western New York, composed mostly of boys much older than herself. During the three following years, her time was spent in teaching through the summer, and attending the Northampton High School in winter, from which she graduated with what is generally considered a thorough New England education.

== Career ==
Subsequent to completing her education, Pittsinger was engaged for several years at Rogers' stereotype institution in Boston as proof-reader and reviewer. In the spring of 1854, she sailed for California; and four years later, her stirring songs and lyrics began to appear in the California journals. Here, she developed many admirers and warm friends by her fervent patriotism and devoted enthusiasm to the zealous efforts in the cause of social and moral reforms. In the mining districts, she was enthusiastically received and appreciated. In 1866 and 1867, at Nevada City, Grass Valley, and at the lakes and among the Sierra Nevadas, at San Francisco and elsewhere, she read her own poems to enthusiastic audiences, and at the same time wrote letters of travel for San Francisco papers. A farewell benefit was tendered her by the influential people of that city on the eve of her departure for a visit north. She wrote an extended “Poem on California,” to be compiled with others.

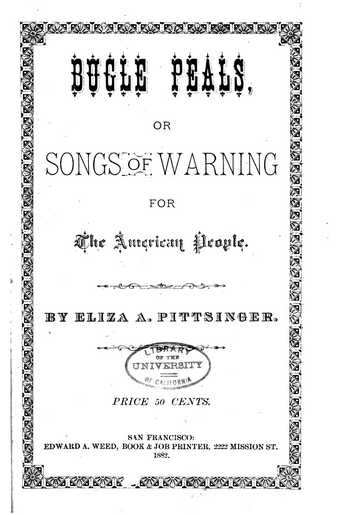
Bugle Peals

In the early 1860s-1870s, Pittsinger was well known within the poetic world. Then, her poems regarding the eternity of life, the sublimity of love, and the glory of patriotism thrilled readers. With patriotic fervor she wrote war songs, the inspiring words of which stirred California youth for the cause of The Union in the days of the American Civil War. She was called "The California Poetess". Her poems were recited in the schools and taught by teachers of elocution. No public meeting was complete in those days without a rendition of one of her thrilling "Bugle Peals", or her "Song of the Soul Victorious," a lyric on the immortality of life which she considered her masterpiece. Throughout California, she was known and revered. But in later days, the lyrics grew less inspiring, though her enthusiasm never wavered. Slowly among the rising generations of young people, her popularity waned and faded away. At the time of her death, her name was practically unknown.

She wrote wholly from aspiration. Freedom and justice to all was her motto. She accepted the theory of reincarnation, embodiments in the material form, and the varied experiences thereby obtained, to prepare it for its immortal destiny. That idea was embodied in a number of her most remarkable poems. She was chosen the poet for the 40th anniversary celebration of the raising of the first American flag in California. She wrote a stirring poem for the 400th anniversary of the birth of Martin Luther, which was recited by herself and others on that occasion. Her poems were varied and numerous.

== Personal life ==
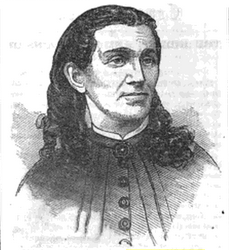
Eliza A. Pittsinger

With the exception of eight years spent in the north Atlantic States, she lived in San Francisco since the days of the war. She lived with her only sister, Almira Ingram Holcomb, who was an invalid. After Almira died in May 1907, Pittsinger lived practically alone. As late as 1906, she wrote a short poem on the earthquake, and it was one of her hopes for some time to have all her works gathered and published. She had been ill for only four days before her death, to the last, protesting that she was going to recover. She died in San Francisco on February 22, 1908.

== Selected works ==
- Anti-Blaine campaign poem ...
- The National Rally. A New Patriotic Song
- The eternal now
- Gem of the grand encampment: California's welcome to the Grand Army of the Republic
- Society of California Pioneers : ceremonies at the laying of the corner stone of the New Pioneer Hall, July 7th, 1862. Oration, 1862
- Poem.
- O quiver neath the morning sun (hymn)
