= Springfield metropolitan area, Massachusetts =

Springfield Metropolitan Area
- Metropolitan Statistical Area
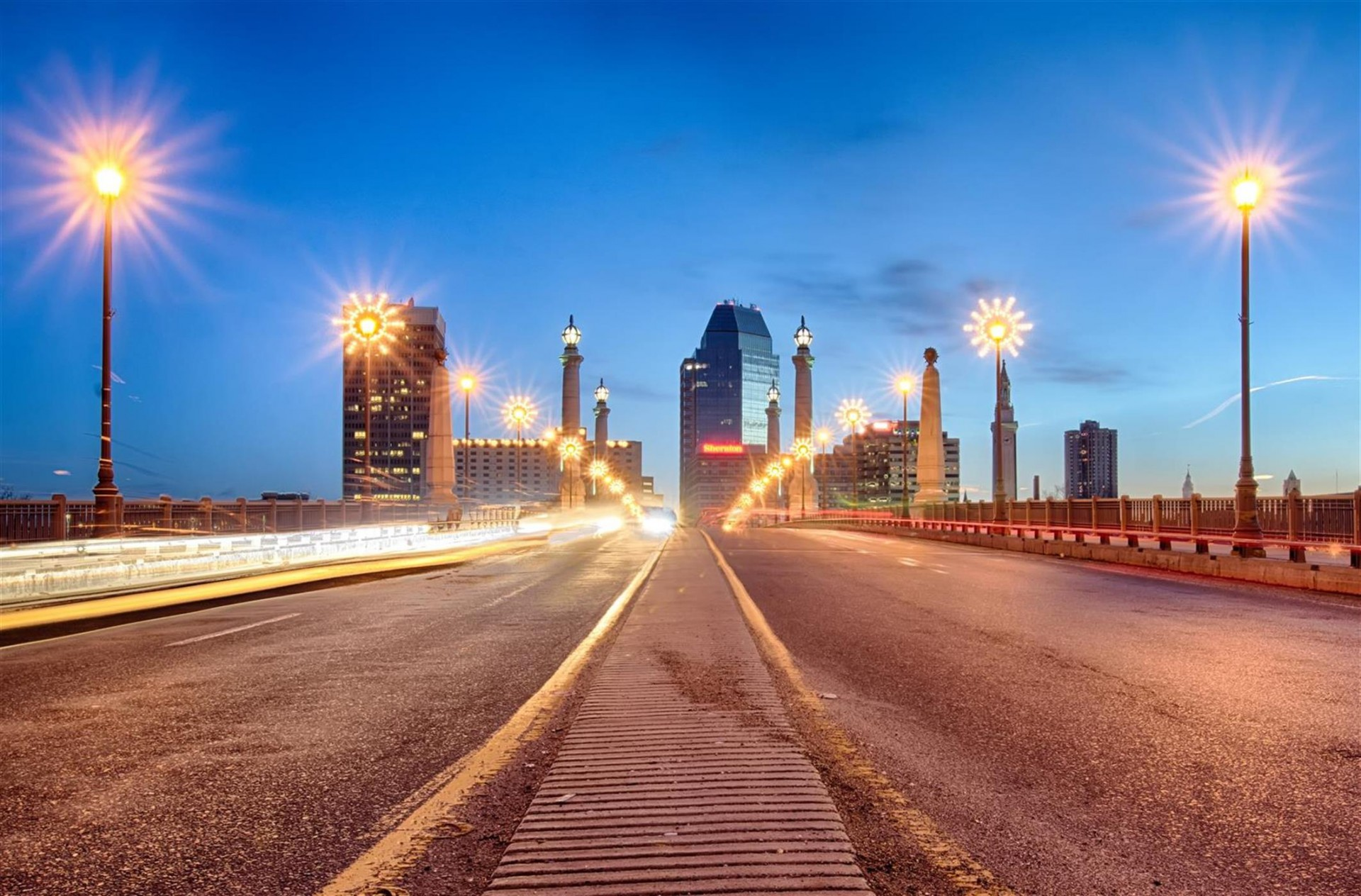
- Springfield Metro Center from the Hampden County Memorial Bridge at blue hour
Springfield–Amherst Town–Northampton, MA CSA
Springfield, MA MSA
Amherst Town–Northampton, MA MSA
Greenfield, MA µSA
- Country: United States
- State: Massachusetts
- Principal municipalities: Springfield Franklin County: Ashfield; Bernardston; Buckland; Charlemont; Colrain; Conway; Deerfield; Erving; Gill; Greenfield; Hawley; Heath; Leverett; Leyden; Monroe; Montague; New Salem; Northfield; Orange; Rowe; Shelburne; Shutesbury; Sunderland; Warwick; Wendell; Whately; Hampden County: Agawam; Blandford; Brimfield; Chester; Chicopee; East Longmeadow; Granville; Hampden; Holland; Holyoke; Longmeadow; Ludlow; Monson; Montgomery; Palmer; Russell; Southwick; Tolland; Wales; West Springfield; Westfield; Wilbraham; Hampshire County: Amherst; Belchertown; Chesterfield; Cummington; Easthampton; Goshen; Granby; Hadley; Hatfield; Huntington; Middlefield; Northampton; Pelham; Plainfield; South Hadley; Southampton; Ware; Westhampton; Williamsburg; Worthington

Area
  - Total: 1,904 sq mi (4,930 km^{2})

Population
  - Density: 367.9/sq mi (142.0/km^{2})
  - MSA (2020): 465,825(117th)
  - CSA (2020): 699,162(74th)

GDP
  - Total: $40.110 billion (2022)
- Time zone: UTC-5 (Eastern Time Zone)
- Area code: 413

The Springfield metropolitan area, also known as Greater Springfield, is a region that is socio-economically and culturally tied to the City of Springfield, Massachusetts. The U.S. Office of Management and Budget (OMB) defines the Springfield, MA Metropolitan Statistical Area (MSA) as consisting of Hampden County in Western Massachusetts. As of 2025, the metropolitan area's population was estimated at 464,338, making it the 118th-largest metropolitan area in the United States.

The OMB also defines the Springfield–Amherst Town–Northampton, MA Combined Statistical Area (CSA), a three-county combined statistical area that adds the Amherst Town–Northampton metropolitan area (Hampshire County) and the Greenfield micropolitan area (Franklin County) to the Springfield MSA. As of 2025, the CSA's population was estimated at 699,101, making it the 75th-largest in the United States. Greater Springfield is one of two combined statistical areas in Massachusetts; the other is Greater Boston.

== History ==
Historically, the U.S. Census Bureau has also identified the region as "Springfield–Holyoke" as those cities were the area's population centers as recently as 1980; since that time the population has become further distributed, including new growth in Amherst, Westfield, and West Springfield, and Northern Connecticut.

When Standard Metropolitan Areas (predecessors of today's Metropolitan Statistical Areas) were introduced by the Bureau of the Budget (now the OMB) in 1950, the Springfield–Holyoke, MA–CT SMA was delineated based on New England towns. The Springfield–Holyoke SMA initially consisted of ten towns in Hampden County, three towns in Hampshire County, and one town (Enfield) in Hartford County, CT. Towns were used as the basis of the Springfield metropolitan area until 2003, though an alternative county-based definition was introduced in 1983 with the creation of New England County Metropolitan Areas (NECMAs); in 1983 the Springfield, MA NECMA consisted of Hampden and Hampshire Counties.

Since 2003, metropolitan statistical areas in New England have been defined using counties, replacing NECMAs. Franklin County was added to the MSA in 2003, removed in 2013 to form the separate Greenfield Town, MA Micropolitan Statistical Area, and added back to the Springfield MSA in 2018. In 2023, Franklin County was removed again, reforming the Greenfield µSA. Hampshire County was also split off in 2023 to create the separate Amherst Town–Northampton, MA MSA, leaving only Hampden County in the Springfield MSA. All three counties are included in the broader Springfield–Amherst Town–Northampton, MA Combined Statistical Area.

New England city and town areas (NECTAs) were developed in 2003 to replace the former town-based definitions of Metropolitan Statistical Areas. In New England, towns are a much more important level of government than counties; county government in New England is weak at best, and in Connecticut, Rhode Island, and most of Massachusetts, does not exist at all. In 2020, the Springfield, MA–CT NECTA comprised 21 towns in Hampden County, 20 towns in Hampshire County, eight towns in Franklin County, four towns in Hartford County, CT, and one town in Tolland County, CT (Somers). NECTAs were discontinued in July 2023.

== Components of the CSA ==
Statistical Area	2025 estimate	2020 Census	Change	Area	Density
Springfield, MA MSA (Hampden County)	464,338	465,825	−0.32%	634 sq mi (1,640 km^{2})	732/sq mi (283/km^{2})
Amherst Town–Northampton, MA MSA (Hampshire County)	164,065	162,308	+1.08%	545 sq mi (1,410 km^{2})	301/sq mi (116/km^{2})
Greenfield, MA µSA (Franklin County)	70,698	71,029	−0.47%	725 sq mi (1,880 km^{2})	98/sq mi (38/km^{2})
Total	699,101	699,162	−0.01%	1,904 sq mi (4,930 km^{2})	367/sq mi (142/km^{2})

== Component cities/towns of the NECTA ==
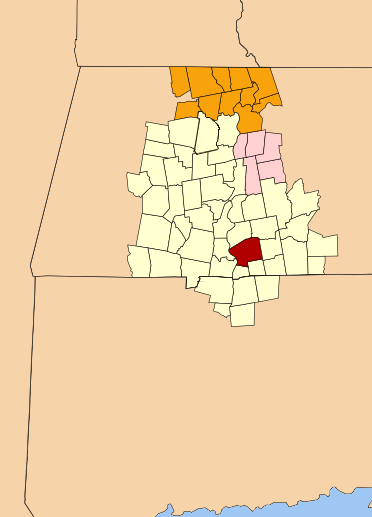
Springfield, MA Metropolitan NECTA shown in cream color, with Springfield highlighted in red. The adjacent NECTAs of Amherst (pink) and Greenfield (orange) are also shown.

- Amherst
- Ashfield
- Agawam
- Belchertown
- Blandford
- Chester
- Chesterfield
- Chicopee
- Conway
- Cummington
- Deerfield
- East Longmeadow
- East Windsor, Connecticut
- Easthampton
- Enfield, Connecticut
- Goshen
- Granby
- Granville
- Hadley
- Hampden
- Hatfield
- Holyoke
- Huntington
- Leverett
- Longmeadow
- Ludlow
- Monson
- Montgomery
- Northampton
- Palmer
- Pelham
- Russell
- Shutesbury
- Somers, Connecticut
- South Hadley
- Southampton
- Southwick
- Springfield (principal city)
- Suffield, Connecticut
- Sunderland
- Tolland
- Wales
- Ware
- Wendell
- West Springfield
- Westfield
- Westhampton
- Whately
- Wilbraham
- Williamsburg
- Windsor Locks, Connecticut
- Worthington

== Demographics ==
As of the census of 2010, there were 692,942 people, 269,091 households, and 168,758 families residing within the MSA. The racial makeup of the MSA was 81.10% White, 6.7% African American, 0.30% Native American, 2.5% Asian, 0.04% Pacific Islander, 6.6% from other races, and 2.7% from two or more races. Hispanic or Latino of any race were 15.4% of the population.

As of the census of 2000, there were 680,014 people, 260,745 households, and 167,924 families residing within the MSA. The racial makeup of the MSA was 83.50% White, 5.96% African American, 0.25% Native American, 1.74% Asian, 0.06% Pacific Islander, 6.35% from other races, and 2.13% from two or more races. Hispanic or Latino of any race were 11.15% of the population. In the 2010 census, the metropolitan area had the highest percentage of Puerto Ricans of any metropolitan statistical area in the continental United States.

The median income for a household in the MSA was $42,195, and the median income for a family was $52,551. Males had a median income of $37,784 versus $28,404 for females. The per capita income for the MSA was $20,633.

The median age for the MSA was 38.9 in 2010 overall, with a median age of 37.4 for males and 40.1 for females. The estimated median age in 2017 was 38.2 overall with a median age 36.6 for males and 39.6 for females. Among the 100 most populous MSAs in the United States, the Springfield metropolitan area had the 10th highest life expectancy in 2016 for the top quartile of income earners, adjusted for race and ethnicity, with an overall life expectancy of 87.2.

== Transportation ==
The Pioneer Valley Transit Authority (PVTA) is the primary operator of public transportation services in the Springfield Metropolitan Area. Headquartered in Springfield, the PVTA maintains a fleet of approximately 174 buses, 144 vans, and "is the largest regional transit authority in Massachusetts." Founded in 1974 with the enactment of Massachusetts General Law Chapter 161B, the PVTA serves 24 member communities in Hampden, Hampshire, and Franklin counties. Each member community pays an assessment fee to the PVTA based "on the number of miles served in that city or town." Alternative sources of revenue mostly originate from federal and state governments. The PVTA itself is governed by an advisory board.

From the late 1800s until June 1940, the Springfield Street Railway served much of the greater Springfield metropolitan area with its 208+ mile streetcar system, which connected Springfield with its various neighborhoods like Forest Park and Indian Orchard, nearby cities such as Chicopee, Westfield, Holyoke, Agawam, West Springfield, Ludlow, Longmeadow, East Longmeadow, Palmer, Monson, Wilbraham and Ware and even nearby regions like Worcester, Hartford and the Berkshires.

The Northern portion of the Greater Springfield metro region was similarly served by the Holyoke Street Railway and the closely affiliated Northampton Street Railway which together served their namesake cities along with South Hadley, Chicopee, Northampton, Amherst, Easthampton, Hadley and other nearby cities along with the Connecticut Valley Street Railway which also served Northampton, Amherst and Hadley as well as Greenfield, Turners Falls, Deerfield, Hatfield, Whately and other cities within and outside the metropolitan area. Smaller local street railways like the Shelburne Falls and Colrain Street Railway and an even smaller one in Conway operated in other outlying parts of the greater Springfield region.

Today, bus transportation is offered in various parts of the Greater Springfield metropolitan Area as described above by the Pioneer Valley Transit Authority as well as the Franklin Regional Transit Authority in the northern portion of the metropolitan statistical area. Intercity bus service to various cities within and outside of the commonwealth is available from the locally owned Peter Pan Bus Lines.

Passenger rail service on the Vermonter and, since 2019, the Valley Flyer Amtrak trains are available from John W. Olver Transit Center in Greenfield, Union Station in Northampton, Holyoke, and Springfield Union Station, the last of which is served also by the Hartford Line, a CT Rail route offering frequent service from Springfield to Hartford and New Haven, Connecticut, wherein a connection to the New York MTA and the Acela is possible.

A new state-supported Amtrak service that will connect Springfield and its greater metropolitan area with Pittsfield, Worcester, and Boston known as East-West Passenger Rail is in the development phase and has received some initial funding, as has a long-underway effort to reinstate Vermonter (previously the Montrealer) service to Montreal, which has been truncated to St. Albans, Vermont since 1995.

Another similar project, called Northern Tier Passenger Rail which would reactivate the former Fitchburg Railroad and reconnect the northernmost portion of the metro region with Fitchburg, Gardner, North Adams, Orange, Pittsfield, Albany and the cities of the existing MBTA Fitchburg Line in Greater Boston has also been proposed and studied, and is presently awaiting funding following the release of MassDOT's final report in 2024.

== Economy ==
=== Notable companies based in Springfield city proper ===
- American Hockey League
- Baystate Health
- Big Y
- Eversource Energy
- MassMutual
- Merriam-Webster
- Peter Pan Bus Lines
- Wellfleet Group

=== Notable companies based in surrounding towns ===
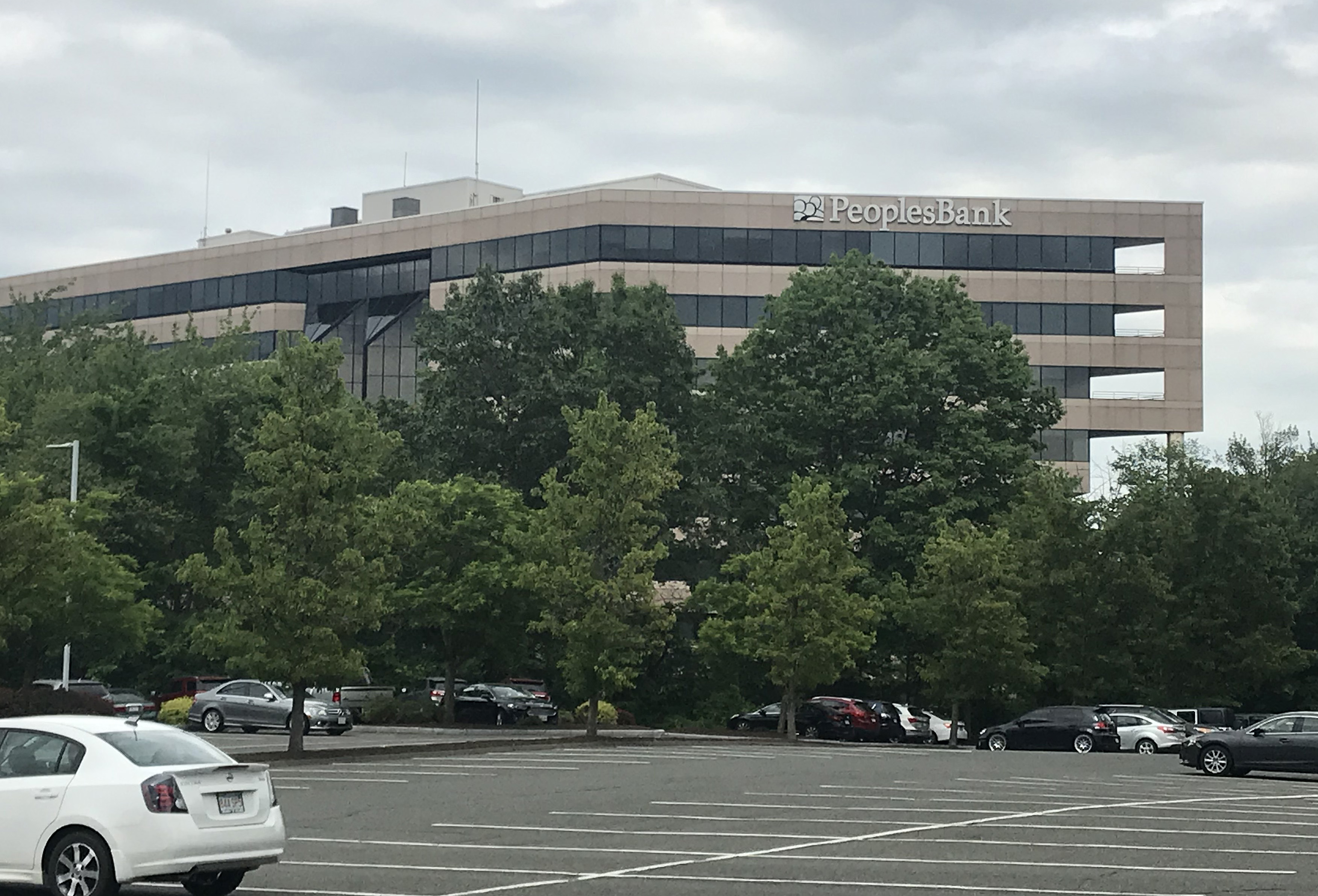
The PeoplesBank headquarters in Holyoke.

- Chemex Coffeemaker (Chicopee)
- Excel Dryer (East Longmeadow)
- PeoplesBank (Holyoke)
- Savage Arms (Westfield)
- Yankee Candle (East Deerfield)

== Media ==
The Springfield metropolitan area is tabulated by Nielsen as the Springfield-Holyoke designated market area, and is the 111th largest television market in the United States, with viewership comparable to Tallahassee and Fort Wayne. The area's local news is characterized by 2 operations, the local NBC affiliate WWLP 22, and the consolidated WesternMassNews, representing CBS affiliate WSHM 3, joint ABC affiliate and FOX affiliate WGGB. In 2019 local NPR affiliate WFCR and PBS WGBY merged operations to form New England Public Media.

== See also ==
- Massachusetts statistical areas
