= Brandon Shileikis =

American baseball coach

Playing career
- 2014–2018: Quinnipiac

Coaching career (HC unless noted)
- 2018–2021: Pittsfield Suns (pitching)
- 2021: Roger Williams (assistant)
- 2022: Amherst (assistant)
- 2022: Niagara Power
- 2023–2025: UMass (assistant)
- 2026: UMass (co-interim HC)

Head coaching record
- Overall: 18–29

Brandon Shileikis is an American college baseball coach and former player. Shileikis was most recently the co-head coach of the UMass Minutemen baseball team.

== Playing career ==
As a player, Shileikis played collegiately for the Quinnipiac Bobcats baseball team and was a four year letter winner. He was a pitcher on the team from 2014 to 2018. He appeared in 51 games with 26 starts, totaling 10 wins and 12 losses.

Shileikis played for the Pittsfield Suns in summers 2016 and 2017. He was also on the North Shore Navigators in summer 2014.

== Coaching career ==
From 2018-2021, Shileikis was a pitching coach for the Pittsfield Suns.

Sheleikis coached at Roger Williams University as the baseball team’s top assistant in Spring 2021.

Shileikis spent a season prior to joining UMass as an assistant coach for the baseball team at Amherst College.

Shileikis also was head coach of the Niagara Power while splitting time at Amherst College.

In September 2022, Shileikis was hired as an assistant coach for the UMass Minutemen baseball team.

After head coach Matt Reynolds left UMass in August 2025, Shileikis ascended to co-head coach of UMass alongside Max Weir.

Shileikis was co-head coach of UMass for one season in 2026 before Weir was given the full-time head coaching position for the 2027 season.

== Personal life ==
Shileikis's hometown is North Dighton, Massachusetts.
