= Goshen, Massachusetts =

Town in Massachusetts, United States

- Town
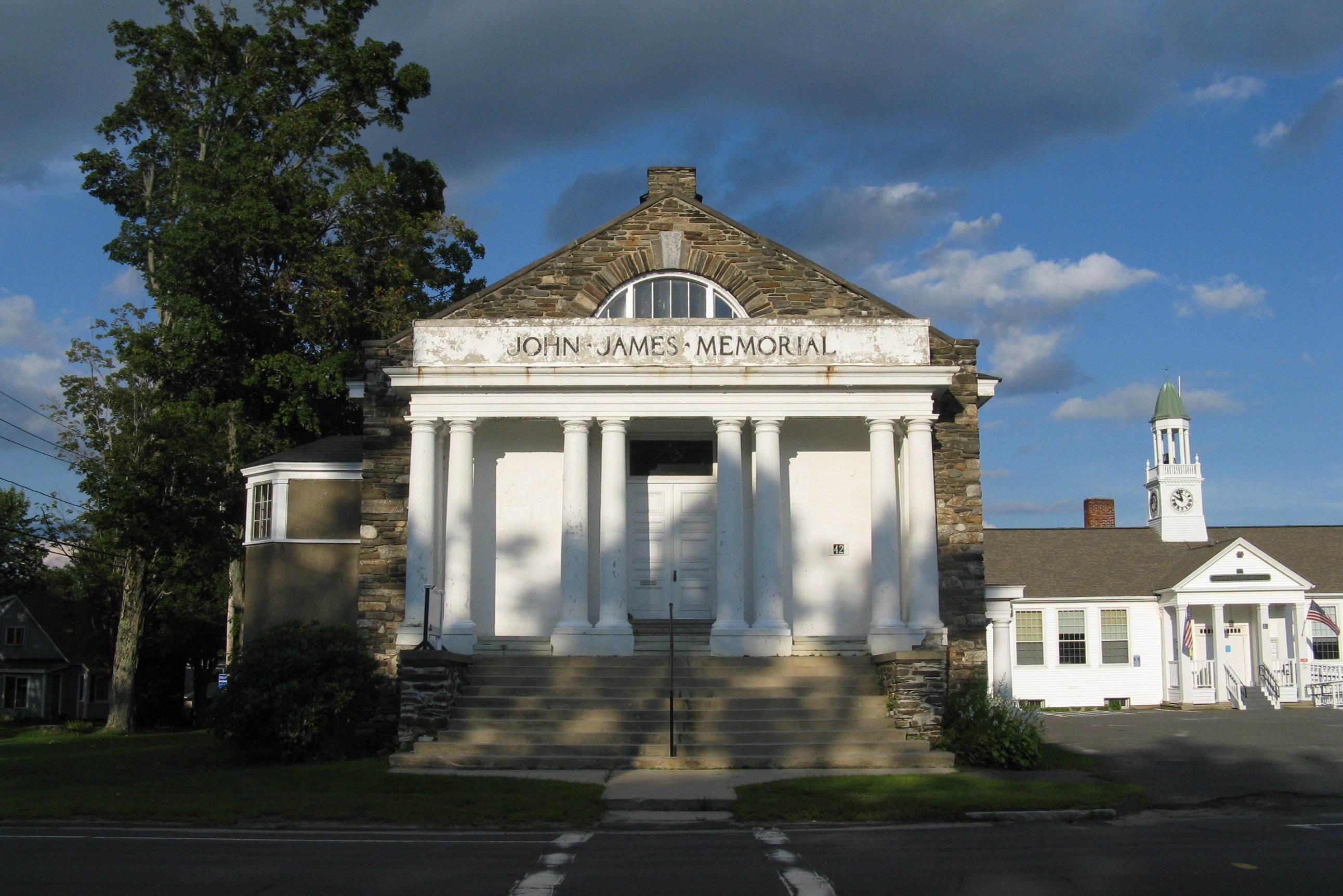
- John James Memorial Library

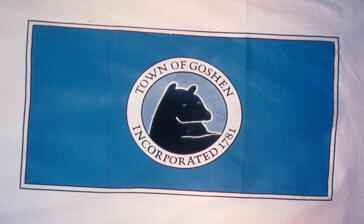
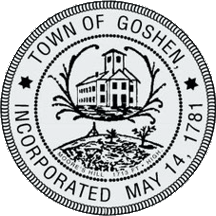
- Flag Seal
- Nickname: G-Town
- Location in Hampshire County in Massachusetts
- Coordinates: 42°26′25″N 72°48′00″W
- Country: United States
- State: Massachusetts
- County: Hampshire
- Settled: 1761
- Incorporated: 1781

Government
  - Type: Open town meeting

Area
  - Total: 17.7 sq mi (45.9 km^{2})
  - Land: 17.4 sq mi (45.0 km^{2})
  - Water: 0.35 sq mi (0.9 km^{2})
- Elevation: 1,368 ft (417 m)

Population (2020)
  - Total: 960
  - Density: 55/sq mi (21/km^{2})
- Time zone: UTC−5 (Eastern)
  - Summer (DST): UTC−4 (Eastern)
- ZIP Codes: 01032 (Goshen); 01096 (Williamsburg)
- Area code: 413
- FIPS code: 25-26290
- GNIS feature ID: 0619391
- Website: www.goshen-ma.us

Goshen (/ˈɡoʊʃən/, GOH-shən) is a town in Hampshire County, Massachusetts, United States. The population was 960 at the 2020 census. It is part of the Springfield, Massachusetts Metropolitan Statistical Area. The town has a rural atmosphere, with one general store, a post office, a fire station, a library, a regional elementary school in nearby Chesterfield, and a town hall. The town encompasses both the Upper and Lower Highland lakes, Upper being a part of the D.A.R. State Forest. The Lower Highland Lake is privately held by a homeowners' association for families who own yearlong and summer properties on the lake.

== History ==
Goshen was first settled in 1761. Until May 14, 1781, it was a part of Chesterfield, Massachusetts. Home to natural beryl deposits, colorless beryl was first discovered in Goshen, leading it to be called goshenite by the gem industry.

== Demographics ==
Historical population
| Year | Pop. | ±% |
|---|---|---|
| 1790 | 681 | — |
| 1850 | 512 | −24.8% |
| 1860 | 439 | −14.3% |
| 1870 | 368 | −16.2% |
| 1880 | 327 | −11.1% |
| 1890 | 297 | −9.2% |
| 1900 | 316 | +6.4% |
| 1910 | 279 | −11.7% |
| 1920 | 224 | −19.7% |
| 1930 | 248 | +10.7% |
| 1940 | 237 | −4.4% |
| 1950 | 321 | +35.4% |
| 1960 | 385 | +19.9% |
| 1970 | 483 | +25.5% |
| 1980 | 651 | +34.8% |
| 1990 | 830 | +27.5% |
| 2000 | 921 | +11.0% |
| 2010 | 1,054 | +14.4% |
| 2020 | 960 | −8.9% |
| 2022* | 947 | −1.4% |
* = population estimate.

As of the census of 2000, there were 921 people, 365 households, and 247 families residing in the town. The population density was 53.0 inhabitants per square mile (20.5/km^{2}). There were 536 housing units at an average density of 30.9 per square mile (11.9/km^{2}). The racial makeup of the town was 99.02% White, 0.11% Native American, 0.22% Asian, and 0.65% from two or more races. Hispanic or Latino of any race were 1.09% of the population.

There were 365 households, out of which 29.9% had children under the age of 18 living with them, 56.2% were married couples living together, 6.8% had a female householder with no husband present, and 32.3% were non-families. Of all households, 18.4% were made up of individuals, and 5.8% had someone living alone who was 65 years of age or older. The average household size was 2.52 and the average family size was 2.94.

In the town, the population was spread out, with 21.9% under the age of 18, 4.3% from 18 to 24, 32.0% from 25 to 44, 31.1% from 45 to 64, and 10.6% who were 65 years of age or older. The median age was 41 years. For every 100 females, there were 88.0 males. For every 100 females age 18 and over, there were 90.2 males.

The median income for a household in the town was $49,583, and the median income for a family was $58,750. Males had a median income of $37,159 versus $27,500 for females. The per capita income for the town was $22,221. About 4.3% of families and 7.9% of the population were below the poverty line, including 7.3% of those under age 18 and 9.5% of those age 65 or over.

== Geography ==
According to the United States Census Bureau, the town has a total area of 17.7 square miles (46 km^{2}), of which 17.4 square miles (45 km^{2}) is land and 0.3 square miles (0.78 km^{2}) (1.98%) is water. Coordinates are 42.44°N 72.81°W.

Goshen and Baker, Missouri, are the only two towns or villages in the United States within 29 miles of four different states. Goshen is 28.5 miles from New York, 28 miles from Connecticut, 26 miles from New Hampshire, and 20 miles from Vermont.

== Education ==
Goshen is part of the Hampshire Regional School district along with Chesterfield, Southampton, Westhampton, and Williamsburg. Students in Goshen attend New Hingham Regional Elementary School in Chesterfield from K–6. High School students typically attend Hampshire Regional High School.

== Points of interest ==
- D.A.R. State Forest A property of the Massachusetts Department of Conservation and Recreation.
- Camp Howe
- The Institute for the Musical Arts
- Three Sisters Sanctuary Arts & Performance space
- Goshen Historical Commission Museum
