= D.A.R. State Forest (Massachusetts) =

Protected area in Massachusetts, United States

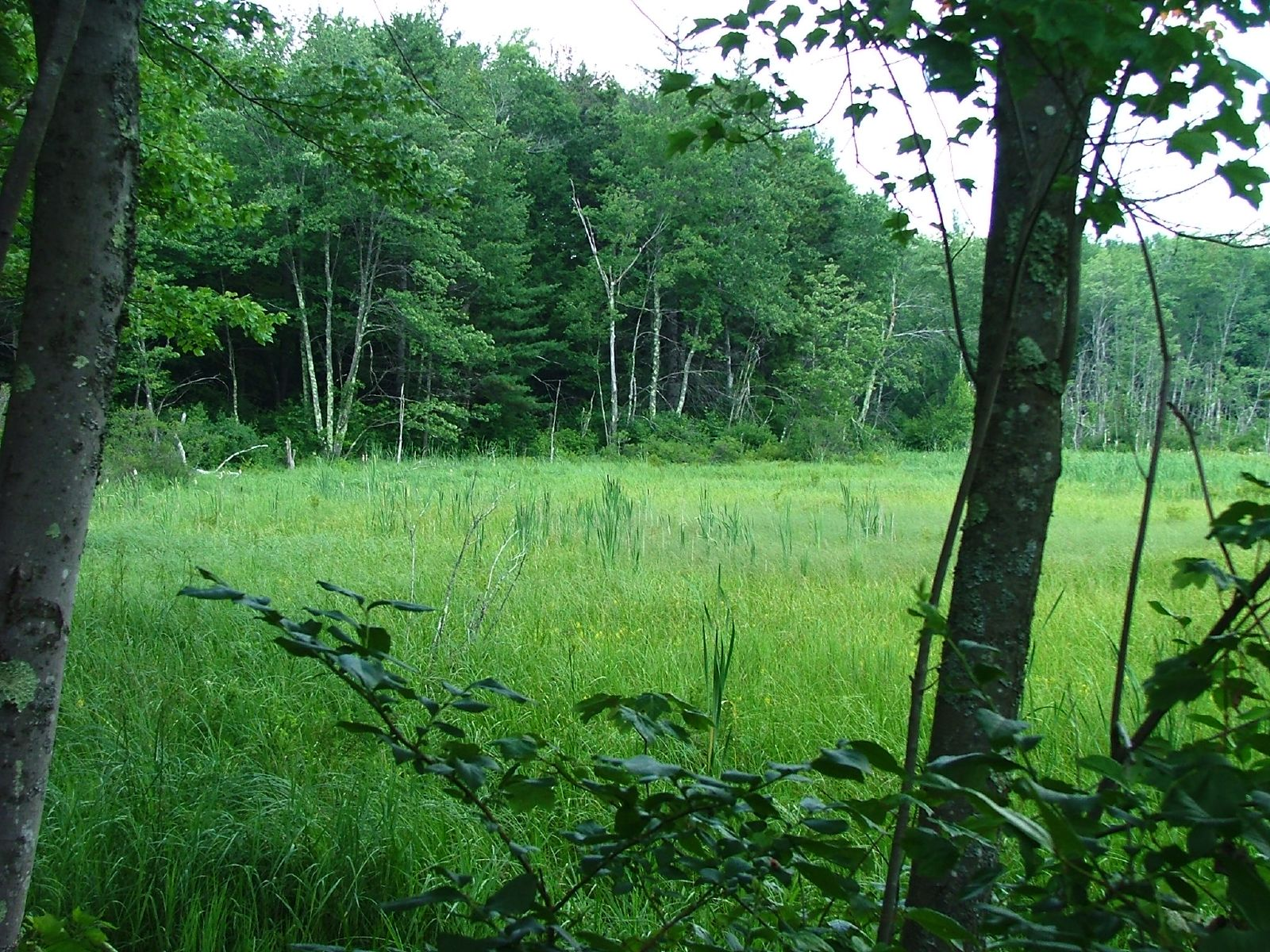
- D.A.R. State Forest, July 2007

- Location within Massachusetts Location within the United States
- Location: Goshen and Ashfield, Massachusetts, United States
- Coordinates: 42°27′25″N 72°47′53″W
- Area: 1,728 acres (699 ha)
- Elevation: 1,424 ft (434 m)
- Established: 1929
- Administrator: Massachusetts Department of Conservation and Recreation
- Website: Official website

The Daughters of the American Revolution State Forest is a publicly owned forest with recreational features located mostly in the town of Goshen with some spillage into neighboring Ashfield, Massachusetts. Activities center around Upper and Lower Highland Lakes. The state forest encompasses 1,728 acres (699 ha) and is managed by the Department of Conservation and Recreation.

== History ==
The forest was established in 1929 when 1,020 acres (410 ha) were donated to the state by the Daughters of the American Revolution. Improvements made in the 1930s by the Civilian Conservation Corps included the reconstruction of dams, the creation of camping and picnicking areas, and the building of roads and bridges.

== Activities and amenities ==
The forest abuts Upper Highland and Lower Highland lakes, which provide opportunities for swimming, fishing, and non-motorized boating. The 15 miles (24 km) of mixed-use trails that cross through the northern hardwood-conifer forest are used for hiking, mountain biking, and horseback riding. Camping is offered at 51 campsites. The Goshen fire tower provides views of the Connecticut River Valley and surrounding states. Winter activities include cross-country skiing, snowshoeing, snowmobiling, and ice fishing.
