= Hampshire Regional High School =

School in Massachusetts, United States

Location
- 19 Stage Road; Westhampton, Massachusetts 01027; United States; 42°18′07.32″N 72°46′18.34″W

Information
- Type: Middle/High school Open enrollment
- School district: Hampshire Regional School District
- Superintendent: Vito Perrone
- Principal: Lauren Hotz
- Faculty: 69.82 (FTE)
- Grades: 7–12
- Enrollment: 690 (2023–2024)
- Student to teacher ratio: 9.88
- Colors: Red and white
- Team name: Raiders
- Budget: $13,534,639 total $16,185 per pupil (2016)
- Communities served: Westhampton, Southampton, Williamsburg, Goshen, Chesterfield
- Website: Hampshire Regional Middle and High School

Hampshire Regional High School is a regional secondary school located in Westhampton, Massachusetts, United States, for students in grades 7–12. The school has approximately 750 students from the towns of Westhampton, Southampton, Williamsburg, Goshen, and Chesterfield. Although students from Worthington would usually go to Gateway Regional High School, the town stopped sending students there and now sends students to Hampshire Regional. The principal is Lauren Hotz. The high school assistant principal is Michael Lavelle, and the middle school assistant principal is Kara Sheridan.

The sports teams from Hampshire Regional are called the "Raiders". Team colors are red and white. Sports offered at Hampshire Regional include soccer, cross country, basketball, indoor track, wrestling, baseball, softball, field hockey, track and field, and unified track. Students participating in ice hockey, football, and swimming compete in a co-op arrangement with Easthampton High School teams. Students participating in Nordic skiing compete in a co-op arrangement with the Mohawk Regional High School team. Students participating in lacrosse compete in a co-op arrangement with the Northampton High School teams.
