= Westhampton, Massachusetts =

- Town
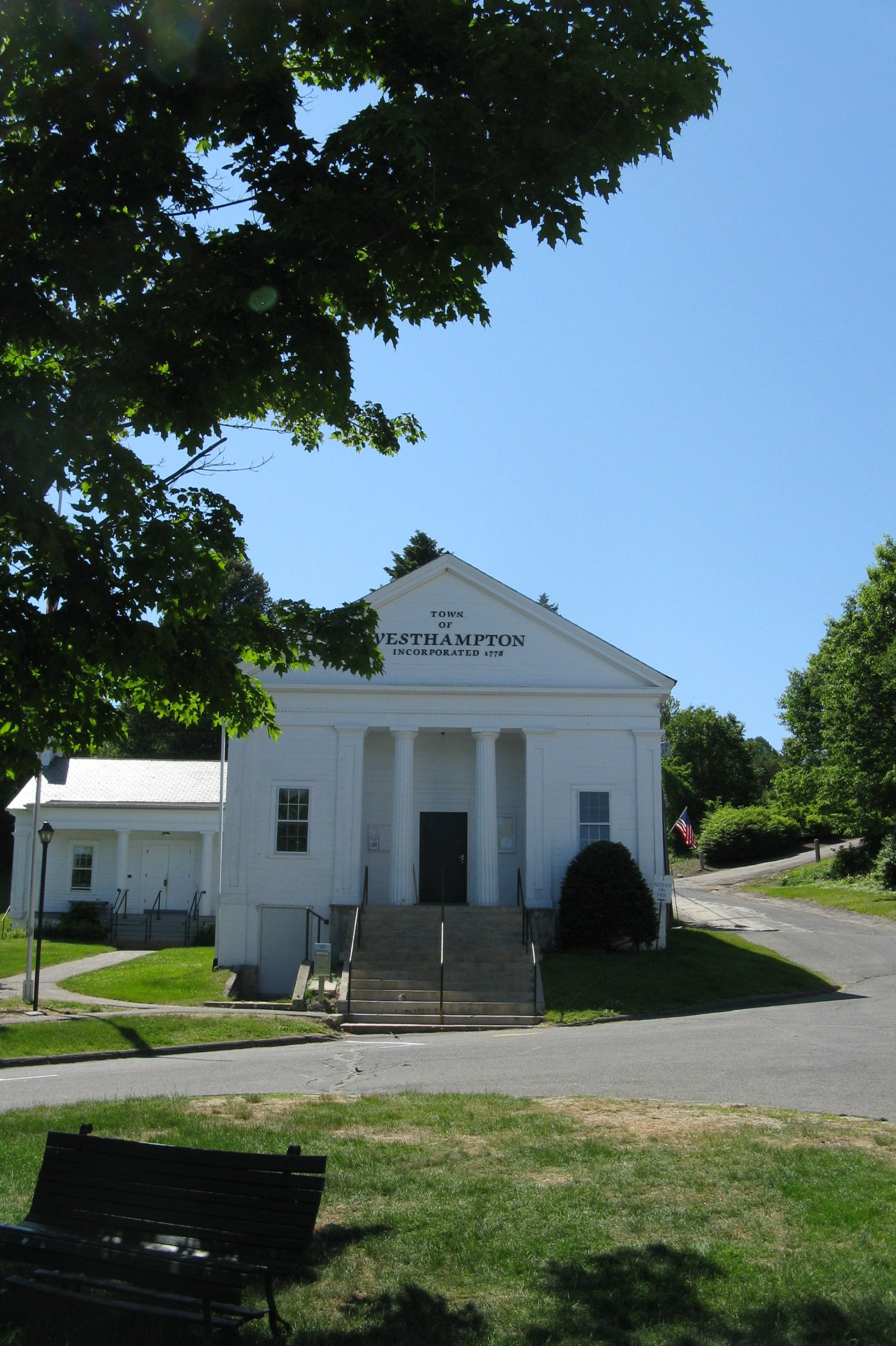
- Westhampton Town Hall

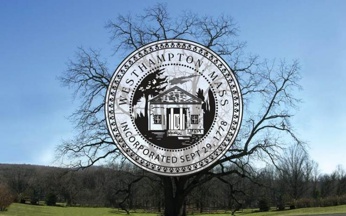
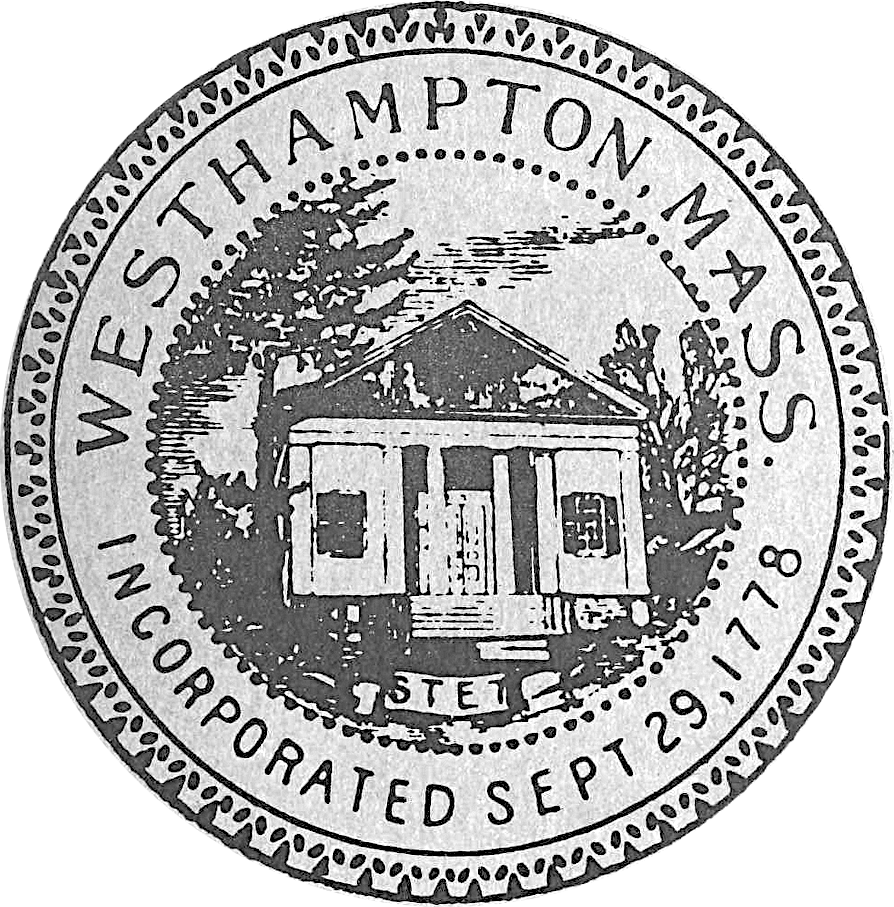
- Flag Seal

- Location in Hampshire County in Massachusetts
- Coordinates: 42°18′10″N 72°46′30″W
- Country: United States
- State: Massachusetts
- County: Hampshire
- Settled: 1762
- Incorporated: 1778

Government
  - Type: Open town meeting

Area
  - Total: 27.4 sq mi (70.9 km^{2})
  - Land: 27.2 sq mi (70.4 km^{2})
  - Water: 0.19 sq mi (0.5 km^{2})
- Elevation: 732 ft (223 m)

Population (2020)
  - Total: 1,622
  - Density: 59.7/sq mi (23.0/km^{2})
- Time zone: UTC-5 (Eastern)
  - Summer (DST): UTC-4 (Eastern)
- ZIP Code: 01027
- Area code: 413
- FIPS code: 25-76380
- GNIS feature ID: 0618210
- Website: westhamptonma.gov

Westhampton is a town in Hampshire County, Massachusetts, United States. The population was 1,622 at the 2020 census. It is part of the Springfield, Massachusetts Metropolitan Statistical Area.

== History ==
Westhampton was first settled in 1762. Originally part of Northampton, Westhampton was officially incorporated on September 29, 1778. The first town meeting was held on November 19, 1778, at which the Reverend Enoch Hale, brother of American spy Nathan Hale, was chosen to be the town's first minister.

Westhampton is one of eight "dry" towns in the Commonwealth, meaning that the sale of alcoholic beverages is prohibited within its boundaries.

The town is home to the five-town Hampshire Regional High School, which serves the towns of Westhampton, Southampton, Williamsburg, Goshen, and Chesterfield.

== Geography ==
According to the United States Census Bureau, the town has a total area of 27.4 square miles (70.9 km^{2}), of which 27.2 square miles (70.4 km^{2}) are land and 0.19 square miles (0.5 km^{2}), or 0.68%, are water. Westhampton is bordered by Southampton to the south, Huntington to the west, Chesterfield to the northwest, Williamsburg to the northeast, Northampton to the east, and Easthampton to the southeast.

Massachusetts Route 66 is the sole state highway through the town, leading east 9 miles (14 km) to Northampton and west 5 miles (8 km) to Knightville in the town of Huntington.

== Demographics ==
Historical population
Year	Pop.	±%
1790	683	—
1850	602	−11.9%
1860	608	+1.0%
1870	587	−3.5%
1880	563	−4.1%
1890	477	−15.3%
1900	469	−1.7%
1910	423	−9.8%
1920	305	−27.9%
1930	374	+22.6%
1940	403	+7.8%
1950	452	+12.2%
1960	583	+29.0%
1970	793	+36.0%
1980	1,137	+43.4%
1990	1,327	+16.7%
2000	1,468	+10.6%
2010	1,607	+9.5%
2020	1,622	+0.9%
2022*	1,620	−0.1%
* = population estimate. Source: United States Census records and Population Estimates Program data.

As of the census of 2000, there were 1,468 people, 542 households, and 422 families residing in the town. The population density was 54.1 inhabitants per square mile (20.9/km^{2}). There were 623 housing units at an average density of 23.0 per square mile (8.9/km^{2}). The racial makeup of the town was 98.50% White, 0.34% Native American, 0.14% Asian, 0.27% from other races, and 0.75% from two or more races. Hispanic or Latino of any race were 0.54% of the population.

There were 542 households, out of which 34.3% had children under the age of 18 living with them, 69.0% were married couples living together, 5.9% had a female householder with no husband present, and 22.1% were non-families. 15.9% of all households were made up of individuals, and 5.2% had someone living alone who was 65 years of age or older. The average household size was 2.71, and the average family size was 3.07.

In the town, the population was spread out, with 25.4% under the age of 18, 5.0% from 18 to 24, 31.0% from 25 to 44, 29.4% from 45 to 64, and 9.2% who were 65 years of age or older. The median age was 40 years. For every 100 females, there were 98.4 males. For every 100 females age 18 and over, there were 97.3 males.

The median income for a household in the town was $60,089, and the median income for a family was $66,625. Males had a median income of $42,200 versus $35,809 for females. The per capita income for the town was $25,360. About 1.9% of families and 3.5% of the population were below the poverty line, including 4.0% of those under age 18 and 4.3% of those age 65 or over.

Voting in the 2008 presidential election was held at the Westhampton Town Hall. Of the 1,095 votes cast, 62% were for Sen. Barack Obama, in contrast to the 37% of votes that were cast for Sen. John McCain.

== Notable people ==
- Otis Clapp, politician (Massachusetts state representative and member of the old Boston City Council), homeopath, pharmacist, publisher, bookseller, and U.S. Internal Revenue Bureau collector
- Adam Dutkiewicz, guitarist of metalcore band Killswitch Engage
- Mordicai Gerstein, children's book illustrator
- Nathan Hale, an American journalist and newspaper publisher who introduced regular editorial comment as a newspaper feature
- Henry M. Loud, Michigan lumber magnate of the nineteenth century
- Sylvester Judd, Transcendentalist author of 1845's Margaret, friend of Ralph Waldo Emerson and Margaret Fuller
- Eliza A. Pittsinger, American poet of the nineteenth century
