= Southampton, Massachusetts =

- Town
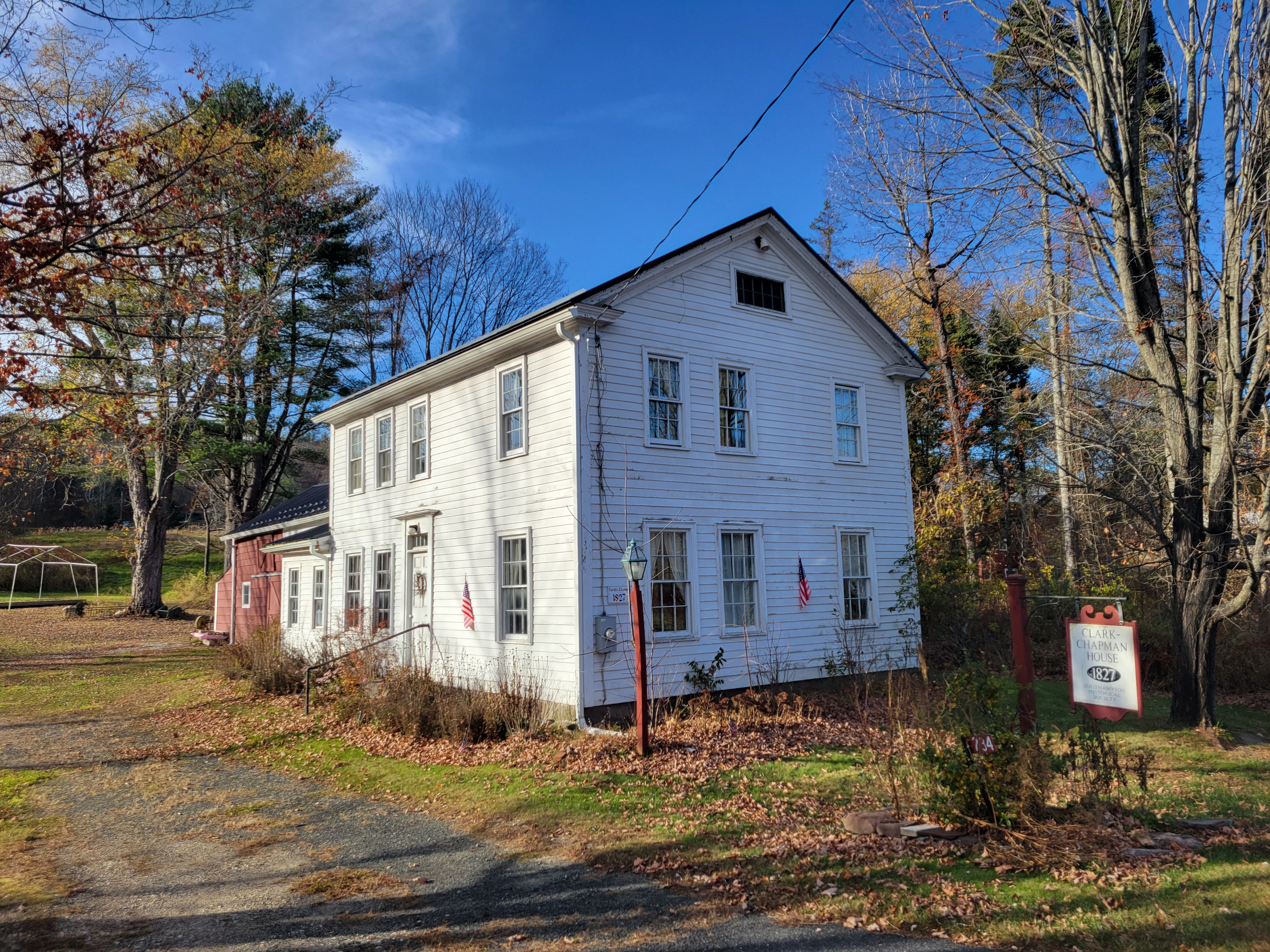
- Clark Chapman House

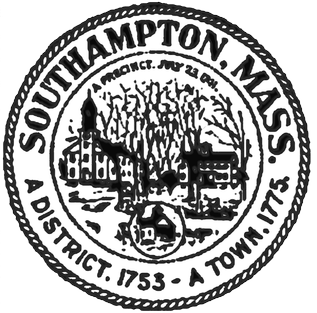
- Seal

- Location of Southampton in Hampshire County, Massachusetts (left) and of Hampshire County in Massachusetts (right)
- Coordinates: 42°13′45″N 72°43′50″W
- Country: United States
- State: Massachusetts
- County: Hampshire
- Settled: 1732
- Incorporated: April 19, 1775

Government
  - Type: Open town meeting

Area
  - Total: 29.1 sq mi (75.3 km^{2})
  - Land: 28.1 sq mi (72.9 km^{2})
  - Water: 0.93 sq mi (2.4 km^{2})
- Elevation: 230 ft (70 m)

Population (2020)
  - Total: 6,224
  - Density: 221/sq mi (85.4/km^{2})
- Time zone: UTC−5 (Eastern)
  - Summer (DST): UTC−4 (Eastern)
- ZIP Code: 01073
- Area code: 413
- FIPS code: 25-62745
- GNIS feature ID: 0618207
- Website: www.townofsouthampton.org

Southampton (/saʊθˈhæmptən/) is a town in Hampshire County, Massachusetts, United States. It was established first as a district of Northampton in 1732. It was incorporated in 1775. The name Southampton was given to it during its first town meeting in 1773. Its ZIP code is 01073. Southampton is part of the Springfield, Massachusetts Metropolitan Statistical Area. The town had a population of 6,224 at the 2020 census.

== History ==
In 1964, U.S. Senator Ted Kennedy was involved in a plane crash in the town.

== Geography ==
According to the U.S. Census Bureau, the town has a total area of 29.1 square miles (75 km^{2}), of which 28.1 square miles (73 km^{2}) is land and 0.9 square miles (2.3 km^{2}) (3.20%) is water. Southampton is bordered by Easthampton to the northeast, Holyoke to the southeast, Westfield to the south, Montgomery to the southwest, Huntington for a very short length on the west, and Westhampton to the northwest. Southampton is located 17 miles northwest of Springfield and 100 miles west of Boston.

=== Climate ===
In a typical year, Southampton temperatures fall below 50 °F (10 °C) for 205 days per year. Annual precipitation is typically 45.9 inches per year (high in the US) and snow covers the ground 66 days per year or 18.1% of the year (high in the US). It may be helpful to understand the yearly precipitation by imagining nine straight days of moderate rain per year. The humidity is below 60% for approximately 18.4 days, or 5% of the year.

== Demographics ==
Historical population
Year	Pop.	±%
1790	829	—
1850	1,060	+27.9%
1860	1,130	+6.6%
1870	1,159	+2.6%
1880	1,046	−9.7%
1890	1,017	−2.8%
1900	1,012	−0.5%
1910	870	−14.0%
1920	814	−6.4%
1930	931	+14.4%
1940	950	+2.0%
1950	1,387	+46.0%
1960	2,192	+58.0%
1970	3,069	+40.0%
1980	4,137	+34.8%
1990	4,478	+8.2%
2000	5,387	+20.3%
2010	5,792	+7.5%
2020	6,224	+7.5%
2022*	6,207	−0.3%
* = population estimate.

As of the 2000 census there were 5,387 people, 1,985 households, and 1,556 families residing in the town. The population density was 191.4 inhabitants per square mile (73.9/km^{2}). There were 2,025 housing units at an average density of 71.9 per square mile (27.8/km^{2}). The racial makeup of the town was 98.29% White, 0.20% African American, 0.13% Native American, 0.63% Asian, 0.20% from other races, and 0.54% from two or more races. Hispanic or Latino of any race were 0.87% of the population.

There were 1,985 households, out of which 36.6% had children under the age of 18 living with them, 66.9% were married couples living together, 8.4% had a female householder with no husband present, and 21.6% were non-families. Of all households 16.8% were made up of individuals, and 6.8% had someone living alone who was 65 years of age or older. The average household size was 2.71 and the average family size was 3.07.

In the town, the population was spread out, with 25.5% under the age of 18, 6.3% from 18 to 24, 29.1% from 25 to 44, 29.2% from 45 to 64, and 9.9% who were 65 years of age or older. The median age was 39 years. For every 100 females, there were 94.3 males. For every 100 females age 18 and over, there were 95.0 males.

The median income for a household in the town was $61,831, and the median income for a family was $64,960. Males had a median income of $41,544 versus $31,250 for females. The per capita income for the town was $26,205. About 1.8% of families and 2.4% of the population were below the poverty line, including 2.8% of those under age 18 and 6.5% of those age 65 or over.

== Notable people ==
- Lewis Strong Clarke (1873–1906), Louisiana sugarcane planter and 19th century Republican politician
- Nancy Conz (1957–2017), marathoner
- Max Weir, baseball coach
- Times of Grace, metalcore band
