= Regional Transit Authority =

Regional Transit Authority may refer to:

- Central Puget Sound Regional Transit Authority
- Greater Cleveland Regional Transit Authority
- Greater Dayton Regional Transit Authority
- New Orleans Regional Transit Authority
- Regional Transit Authority of Southeast Michigan
- Regional Transportation Agency of Central Maryland
- Southwest Ohio Regional Transit Authority

One of 15 Regional Transit Authorities in Massachusetts, including:

- Berkshire Regional Transit Authority
- Cape Cod Regional Transit Authority
- Franklin Regional Transit Authority
- Montachusett Regional Transit Authority (MART)
- Pioneer Valley Transit Authority
- Worcester Regional Transit Authority

== See also ==
- Regional Transportation Authority (disambiguation)
