= University of Massachusetts Transportation Services =

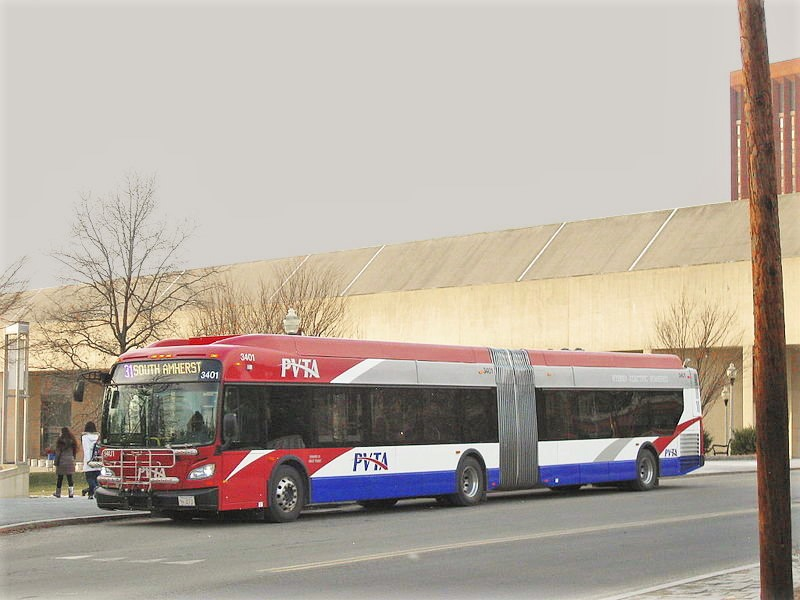
- PVTA bus #3401 makes a stop at the UMass Fine Arts Center on N. Pleasant Street, operating the Route 31.
- Parent: University of Massachusetts Amherst; Pioneer Valley Transit Authority
- Headquarters: 185 Holdsworth Way; Amherst, Massachusetts
- Locale: Five Colleges of the Pioneer Valley
- Service area: Five Colleges campuses plus Amherst, Belchertown, Granby, Hadley, Northampton, South Deerfield, South Hadley and Sunderland
- Service type: Local bus transit, campus shuttle, field trip charter
- Alliance: Five College Consortium
- Routes: 9
- Hubs: UMass Fine Arts Center; Studio Arts Building; Haigis Mall
- Daily ridership: 20,600 (weekdays, Q2 2026)
- Annual ridership: 2,280,500 (2025)
- Fuel type: Diesel, hybrid electric
- Director: Connie Englert
- Website: UMass Transit; PVTA.com

University of Massachusetts Transportation Services, abbreviated to UMass Transit Services or UMass Transit, is a department within the University of Massachusetts Amherst contracted by the Pioneer Valley Transit Authority (PVTA) to operate fixed-route transit services on the UMass Amherst campus and surrounding area, including some services to other members of the Five Colleges Consortium in eastern Hampshire County. Similar to other large campus transportation systems, such as UGA Campus Transit in Georgia and Unitrans in California, PVTA fixed-route buses operated by UMass Transit Services are primarily driven by students attending UMass Amherst. In 2025, PVTA fixed-routes operated by UMass Transit had a ridership of 2,280,500, or about 20,600 per weekday as of the second quarter of 2026.

== Background ==
UMass Transit is a student-based organization with more than 90% of the employees (i.e. bus drivers, mechanics, dispatchers) being UMass students, with the remaining employees falling under University 03 employment status or full time administrators. UMass Transit Services operates 10 PVTA routes with a fleet of 40 transit vehicles (35' - 60').

PVTA service operated by UMass Transit runs 12 months a year, 20 hours per day, seven days per week.

Service began in 1969 as an intra-campus shuttle. A federal grant allowed expansion to nearby towns in 1973. It joined the PVTA in 1976. Daily ridership reached 24,000 by 1982.

Route B79 was originally operated by the Quaboag Valley Community Development Corporation and the Town of Ware, through its Quaboag Connector partnership. PVTA reassigned operation of this route to UMass Transit Services, starting on January 5, 2025.

== Services ==
UMass Transit operates fixed-route buses on behalf of the PVTA, which must outsource mass transit operations pursuant to Massachusetts state law. PVTA maintains ownership of fixed-route buses displaying logos and livery associated with the agency. Other department vehicles are independently chartered by UMass Transit, usually as a paid service. Fixed-route buses are numbered in the 3000 series, and are between 35 and 60 feet in length. UMass Transit operates two of the 60-foot (18 m) articulated buses acquired by PVTA; they were purchased in 2013 to accommodate crowding conditions on routes 30 and 31.

=== Field trip services ===
UMass Transit also maintains an activity fleet of buses geared toward student organizations within the UMass Amherst community. These buses are generally painted to match the school colors of white and maroon.

=== Accessible Van Service ===
UMass Transit operates a fleet of paratransit vans which services members of the UMass Amherst community who have mobility impairments, whether they are permanent or temporary. The service has a range that extends 3 miles from the center of campus.

== Fixed routes ==
The following routes are operated by UMass Transit Services on behalf of the PVTA.

=== Amherst-area routes (including UMass and the Five Colleges) ===
Route	Terminals		Via
30	N. Amherst; Puffton Village	Amherst; Old Belchertown Road (before Harkness Road)	North Pleasant Street, Main Street, Belchertown Road
31	Sunderland; Sugarloaf Estates	S. Amherst; The Boulders	South Pleasant Street, North Pleasant Street, Amherst/Sunderland Road
34/35	UMass Amherst Campus Shuttle		University Drive, Commonwealth Avenue, North Pleasant Street, East Pleasant Street, Eastman Lane, East Pleasant Street, Massachusetts Avenue
38	Amherst; Haigis Mall, UMass	S. Hadley; Mt. Holyoke College	MA Route 116, North Pleasant Street

=== UMass Outreach routes ===
These routes, operated by UMass Transit, are targeted not toward the UMass student body, but towards the year-round local population in the area.

Route	Terminals		Via
33	Hadley; Stop & Shop	N. Amherst; Mill Hollow Apartments/Puffers Pond	Amity Street, East Pleasant Street, Eastman Lane, Cushman Center, Survival Center, North Pleasant Street
45	Amherst; Physical Sciences Building, UMass	Belchertown; Belchertown Center	North Pleasant Street, Main Street, Echo Hill/Gatehouse Road, Belchertown Road
46	Amherst; Studio Arts Building, UMass	S. Deerfield; Whately Park and Ride	North Pleasant Street, Sunderland/Amherst Road, South Deerfield Center
B79	Amherst; Haigis Mall, UMass	Worcester; Union Station Garage	North Pleasant Street, MA Route 9

== Fares ==
All UMass Transit routes, with the exception of B79, are free of charge. Route B79 is priced by fare zones, with full Amherst-Worcester service costing $9.00. Passes may only be purchased digitally on the MassDOT BusPlus App.

Students attending any colleges in the Five Colleges Consortium have a fee included in their tuition bills (service fee for UMass Amherst students and student activity fees for the other colleges) for each semester that prepays their bus fares for the semester and funds the Five Colleges bus system, along with fares on the B43 local route between Amherst College and Smith College via UMass.

== Holiday and school break service levels ==
While the population of Amherst is nominally 39,263 as per the 2020 census, that figure includes the student population of the Five Colleges, many of whom are only part-time residents and who account for approximately 60 percent of that figure. As such, when classes are not in session, service is greatly reduced and often suspended on many routes, and other routes will have service ending early.

All PVTA fixed-routes operated by UMass Transit are suspended on New Year's Day, Memorial Day, Independence Day, Thanksgiving Day, and Christmas Day. On other days when classes are not in session, these routes operate on a reduced service schedule.
