= 1980 Amherst, Massachusetts water shortage =

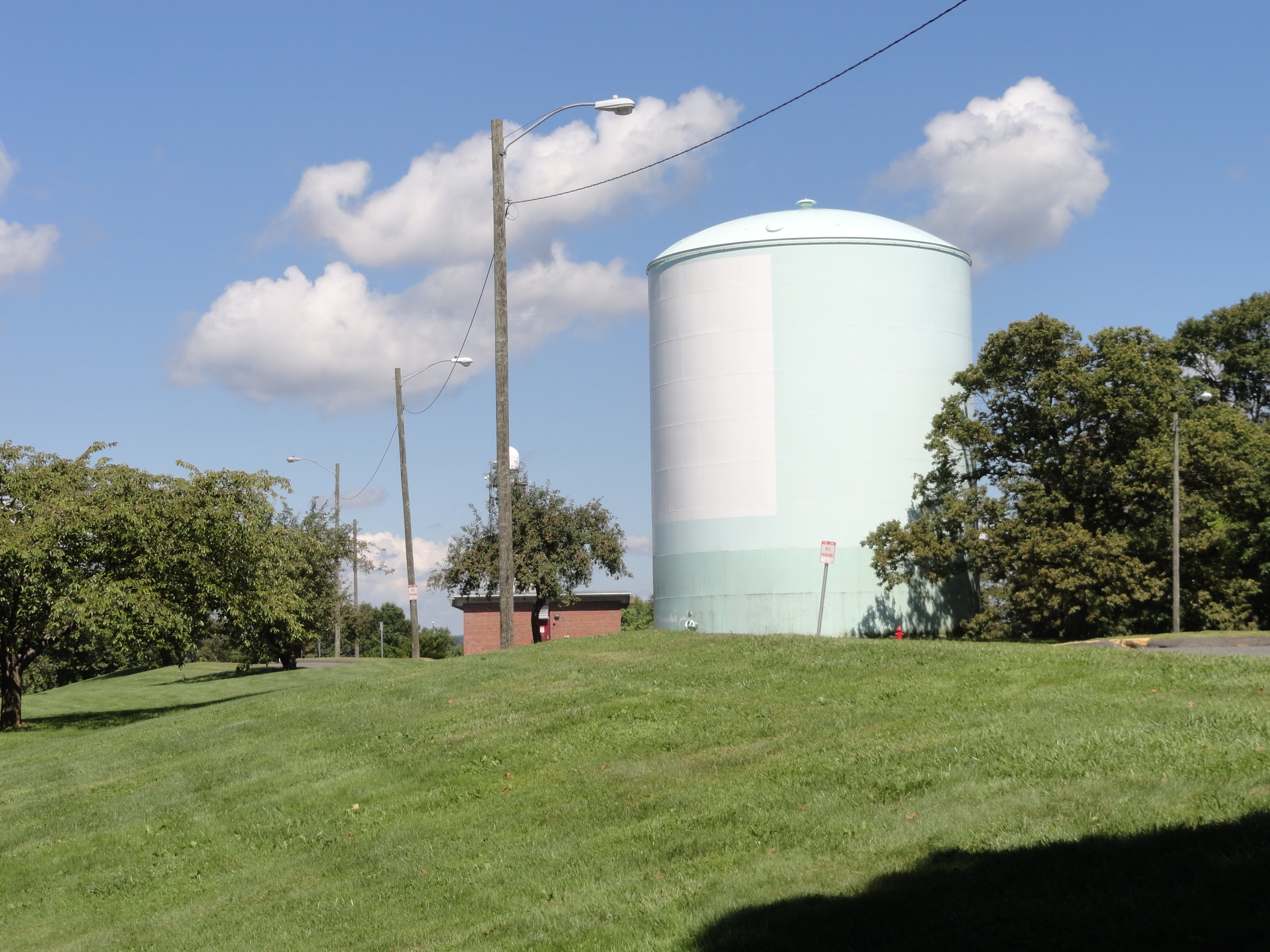
Watertower on the campus of the University of Massachusetts Amherst

The 1980 Amherst, Massachusetts, water shortage was a water crisis in Amherst, Massachusetts, that amongst other impacts, also led to the closure of the University of Massachusetts Amherst for four days from September 4, 1980, to September 7, 1980. Since 1965, communities across the state were experiencing water crises of their own. This was the region's worst drought.

== Background ==
The summer of 1980 was a dry summer for most of the state of Massachusetts. After weeks of drought, the town's reservoirs fell significantly below their normal level. From the beginning of July, total precipitation had been half of the state average, while temperature was higher than average. The Atkins Reservoir near Shutesbury was six feet below normal, and the Hills Reservoir near Pelham was 13 feet below normal, with its output reduced by half. A third reservoir in the same town was 2.5 feet below the normal level.

On August 31, the school opened for the fall semester. Labor Day weekend added to the already challenged situation. As the temperatures rose into the 80s, the demand for water by Labor Day soared to 4.5 million US gallons (17,000,000 L), 700,000 US gallons (2,600,000 L) more than the previous record. Normally, the school uses half of the 3.4 million US gallons (13,000,000 L) that the town produces on an average day.

Soon after, Amherst Town Manager Louis Hayward had a dilemma. Compounding the problem was the fact that in South Amherst, construction of a new well in Lawrence Swamp was still at least a month from completion. This issue then caused the Amherst Board of Selectmen on the following Monday to declare a water emergency, with the aim of cutting water usage by one quarter by banning all outside use of water. Additionally, authorization was given to a selectman to approach the neighboring town of Hadley and purchase water from them. University officials were also placed on a state of alert and asked to cut back water use, something that was asked two years earlier by the school when they put up signs asking students to help with water conservation. In the morning, the fire department was also notified by the town's department of public works to the fact that alarms on the town's four storage tanks were showing that levels had dropped to forty feet, well below the normal level of sixty-two feet. This caused an increase in pumping of water into the tanks.

The first signs of trouble came the next morning when a resident of William M. Cashin House on the northern end of campus called the school's maintenance to report low water levels. A plumber was dispatched, and after checking that the filters weren't clogged, determined it was a supply problem. A call was placed into the local water department. By early afternoon, notices were posted in the dorm advising students on the fifth through eighth floors that there was no water available. Complaints began to trickle in from the Sylvan, Orchard Hill, and Central Residential Areas. All these dorms were on a hill relative to the rest of campus. Health services then went out to local markets and purchased distilled water and secured two fifty-five gallon drums from a Holyoke company.

Eventually, plumbers were dispatched to shut off water, first to the individual floors, then entire buildings. By six that night, the physical plant director alerted Vice Chancellor for Administration and Finance George Beatty about the impending crisis. Around forty five minutes later, the town manager was notified of the problem. Around this time, water shortages were beginning to be noticed in the Southwest Residential Area. In the Mildred Pierpont House, toilets wouldn't stop flushing, a consequence of low water pressure. By 9:30 that night, about 3,000 students were without water. Chancellor Henry Koffler returned from meetings in Boston and was subsequently warned by Beatty that if the pressure continued to drop, the steam plant would have to be shut down, and research projects, air conditioning, and electrical systems would also have to be turned off. All of this would prove costly. By this time, students were travelling to Puffers Pond in North Amherst to clean up. The chancellor was also urged by Hayward to close the campus.

In a last-ditch effort an hour and a half later, water was ordered shut off to the Southwest Residential Area, which contained 5,600 residents at the time. Water service to the John W. Lederle Graduate Research Center, Herter, and Tobin Halls, as well as the showers at the Boyden Gym, were also shut off. Reports from the night state that some students began to hoard water in pails before the taps were shut off. By four the next morning, it was determined that the shutdown of water to the area had no effect and so service was restored. As a result of people leaving the faucets on, the bathrooms flooded when service was restored.

== Shutdown and evacuation ==
At 7:30 that morning, Chancellor Henry Koffler convened a meeting and announced plans to shut down the campus. At ten, campus representatives were informed of the plan, where the only business going on at the school would be "urgent business". Additionally, air conditioning would no longer run at the school. By noon, the campus would close, and, according to notices sent to residence halls, "All students are to leave Amherst as quickly as possible. Only the most difficult cases are to be allowed as exceptions." By the end of the day, seventy percent of the taps in 41 dorms on campus ran dry.

As a result of the campus now being closed, the town of Amherst activated an emergency well on Bay Road, South Amherst, as well as beginning to tap into Hadley's water system. Officials were briefly encouraged when tank levels rose from zero to twenty-one feet by nine that morning, but two hours later, levels began to drop again. As a result of the low water pressure, firefighters began taking a one thousand gallon tanker truck with them when they went on calls.

The mass evacuation of people called for an armada of transportation to suit the needs of students. As a result of this, officials arranged for a group of buses that would transport students to Worcester, Natick, and Boston, beginning at two that afternoon. Calls were soon received from people as far away as Enfield, Connecticut, offering to house the temporarily displaced students. The chancellor even offered to house students, until he realized that his house, perched on the side of Orchard Hill, was also without water. Eventually, the school's transit service set up tables in the Southwest, Sylvan, and Central residential areas to sell bus tickets to the students. The resulting scene was later described as a "madhouse" by a ticket seller. People who were unable to pay were told that if they supplied their student number, they would be billed later. While one report states that fifty buses were used in the evacuation, another one states that fifty-five buses were used that day.

The mood of the remaining students began to turn festive as a result of them not being affected by water shortages. According to The Daily Collegian, the campus newspaper, several fraternity and sorority organizations began to plan "shower parties", which involved a lot of beer. According to The Boston Globe, two liquor stores in town reported a significant increase in sales to students. By late afternoon, the campus was largely deserted of the 11,000 students that had lived there.

== Official response ==
Governor Edward J. King, who was visiting a fair in nearby Northampton, instructed the state police to begin to patrol the now empty campus to deter looters. The campus also promised to beef up police presence. As the campus remained in twenty four-hour lockdown, only six hundred students remained on campus, including three hundred international students in Walter E. Prince Hall, and three hundred and sixty residential assistants. Some student athletes also remained behind. The national guard also brought in eight tanks of water and purchased hundreds of empty cider jugs from a local farm. The dining commons also switched to paper plates and plastic utensils and water was shut off to the dorms by the physical plant.

== Return to normalcy ==
Soon after, the town began to refill its tanks and bring in new supplies. Campus officials planned to have students back on campus by Sunday. A blame game ensued between town and campus officials. Eventually, this settled down as the focus shifted on bringing students back. Students were also reimbursed for room and dining commons. Depending on their meal plan, students were reimbursed between $22.89 and $26.76. A plan by the president of the Student Government Association to charter fifteen buses was turned down. Bathrooms were also cleaned and disinfected to allow for students to come back, and an extension of the add-drop deadline was announced. One entrepreneuing student who stayed behind began to hawk "UMass Evacuation" T-shirts, which showed a dripping faucet labeled "Amherst DPW". All one hundred and sixty-eight shirts were sold within two hours.

== Aftermath ==
The campus reopened on September 8, and classes resumed the next day. Town officials then tried to figure out how the crisis developed and why the town manager was never told of the shortage of water. The town also continued to borrow water and use an emergency well until another one was opened at the end of September.

The crisis prompted an investigation, leading to long-term improvements in water management practices. The incident underscored the challenges of managing water resources in a rapidly growing community with limited infrastructure. In an interview, the head of the new Amherst Town Water Conservation Project, Chuck Lacey, said, "We are a small town with small reservoirs and if it doesn't rain for six weeks they dry up. We've been taking a gamble for years with the expansion of the university." Paul Godfrey, head of the Water Resources Research Center at the University of Massachusetts Amherst said that, "...the problem has been coming at us for 15 years. The university kept expanding but nobody did anything about the water.
