= Pioneer Valley Transit Authority =

Pioneer Valley (Springfield, MA Metro Area & UMASS Amherst) Fixed Bus Route Service

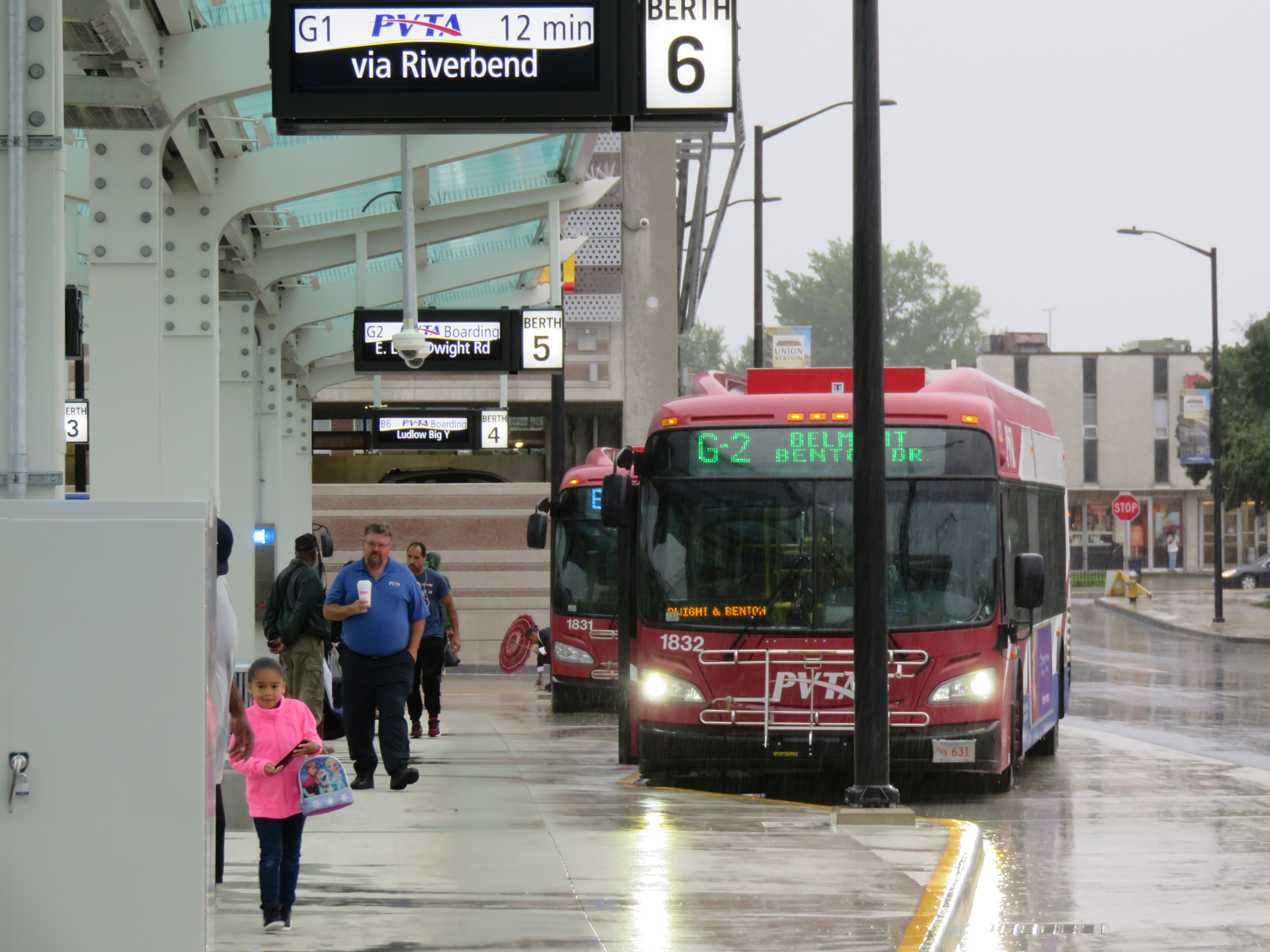
- Union Station, a multi-modal transportation center in Springfield featuring local and intercity bus, train, and taxi service, as well as a parking garage.
- Founded: 1974
- Headquarters: 2808 Main Street; Springfield, MA 01107
- Locale: Pioneer Valley, Massachusetts
- Service area: Hampden and Hampshire counties
- Service type: Bus, demand response
- Routes: 48 (as of May 2026)
- Hubs: Springfield Union Station; Holyoke Transportation Center; Westfield Olver Transit Pavilion; Northampton Academy of Music; UMass Haigis Mall / Fine Arts Center / Studio Arts Building
- Depots: Cottage Street Operations and Maintenance Facility; Main Street Operations and Maintenance Facility; Northampton Operations and Maintenance Facility; UMass Bus Garage
- Fleet: 189 buses, 138 vans
- Annual ridership: 9,472,133 (FY2025)
- Fuel type: Diesel, gasoline, battery-electric
- Operator: DGR Management, Inc.; University of Massachusetts Transportation Services; Hulmes Transportation Services; MV Transportation
- Administrator: Sandra Sheehan
- Website: https://www.pvta.com/

The Pioneer Valley Transit Authority (PVTA) oversees and coordinates public transportation in the Pioneer Valley of Western Massachusetts, offering fixed-route bus service, paratransit service, and senior van service. PVTA was created by Chapter 161B of the Massachusetts General Laws in 1974. Based in Springfield, Massachusetts, PVTA serves Hampden and Hampshire counties, and provides connecting service to CTtransit in Hartford County, Connecticut, to FRTA in Franklin County, to BRTA in Berkshire County, and to WRTA in Worcester County. It is the largest regional transit authority, and second largest public transit system in Massachusetts after the Massachusetts Bay Transit Authority, providing service to over 11 million riders annually across 24 municipalities in the region, with about 70% of all riders using the system as their primary mode of transit.

== Organizational structure ==
As per Section 25, Chapter 161B of the Massachusetts General Laws, regional transit authorities in Massachusetts are not permitted to directly operate their service, but must instead contract with other entities to operate transit service. Contractors and their staff are based at various vehicle depots dispersed throughout the service area.

The Springfield Area Transit Company (SATCo) operates the southern portion of PVTA's service area, servicing Hampden County. SATCo, located at 665 Cottage Street in Springfield, is managed by DGR Management. All SATCo fixed-route buses are numbered in the 1000 series.

The Valley Area Transit Company (VATCo) operates the central portion of PVTA's service area. Most of its routes originate from Northampton, providing connections to the UMass Transit service area via Route 9, and to the SATCo service area on the other side of the Mount Tom Range via Routes 5 and 10. VATCo, located at 54 Industrial Drive in Northampton, is managed by DGR Management. All VATCo fixed-route buses are numbered in the 7000 series.

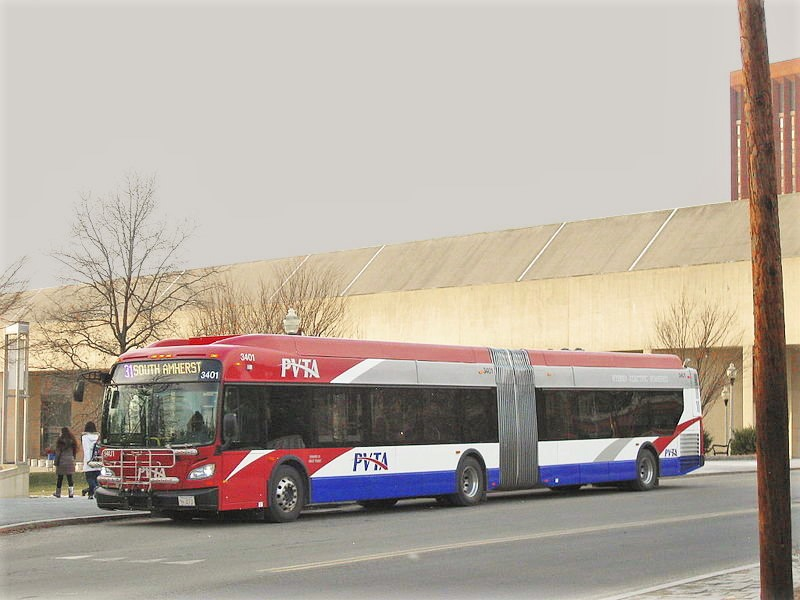
A PVTA articulated bus operating Route 31 at the UMass Amherst Fine Arts Center

University of Massachusetts Transportation Services operates PVTA's routes through the Five Colleges area in eastern Hampshire County and neighboring towns, with most of the routes centered around UMass Amherst, the largest ridership generator in the service area. UMass Transit Services is a department within the University of Massachusetts Amherst. The UMass Transit garage is located on-campus at 185 Holdsworth Way, Amherst. All UMass Transit fixed-route buses are numbered in the 3000 series.

The fixed-route van shuttles (Ware Shuttle, Palmer Shuttle, and Nashawannuck Express) are operated by Hulmes Transportation Services, located at 15 Bridge Street in Belchertown. These routes are operated by vans numbered in the 1200 series.

ADA Paratransit Service and Senior Van Service is provided by MV Transportation for the entire service area. MV is based at 2840 Main Street in Springfield. All paratransit vehicles are numbered in the 5000 series.

The three Western Massachusetts transit authorities – the Berkshire Regional Transit Authority, the Franklin Regional Transit Authority, and the PVTA – began operating weekday-only intercity routes branded as "Link413" (after area code 413) in January 2026. Initial service included a Pittsfield–Northampton route.

== Routes ==
=== Springfield-area ===
These routes are operated by the Springfield Area Transit Company (SATCo), except for the Ware Shuttle and Palmer Shuttle, which are operated by Hulmes Transportation Services.

Route	Route Name	Notes
G1	Chicopee / Sumner Avenue-Allen Street-Canon Circle	
G2	East Springfield via Carew St / Belmont Avenue - Dwight St	
G3	Springfield Plaza via Liberty St / King St - Westford Circle	Also serves Springfield Registry of Motor Vehicles.
B4	Plainfield Street	Serves Wason Medical Offices.
G5	Dickinson Street-Jewish Home-Longmeadow	Connects with CTtransit 905 (Windsor Locks - Enfield Express) at MassMutual - Bright Meadow Campus, Enfield, CT.
B6	Ludlow via Bay St	Some trips enter Indian Orchard via Pasco Road and Goodwin Street instead. Limited trips serve and terminate at the Encompass Health Rehabilitation Hospital of Western Mass.
B7	Wilbraham Big Y-State St-Boston Rd	Some trips serve Independence House daily. On Weekdays, there are some limited trips that serve and terminate at Colonial Estates.
R10	Westfield / WSU / West Springfield via Route 20	Limited trips serve Union Street in West Springfield.
P11	Holyoke Community College Express	Only operates when classes are in session.
B12	Stonybrook Express	
R14	Feeding Hills-Springfield	Some trips serve Heritage Nursing Home and Agawam Industrial Park.
B17	Wilbraham Big Y-Worthington St-Wilbraham Rd	
G19	Holyoke-Montcalm-Chicopee	Replaces former X90A service between downtown Holyoke and Chicopee Big Y, via Montcalm St and Memorial Dr.
P20	Holyoke-Springfield via Holyoke Mall	
P21	Holyoke-Springfield via Chicopee	
P21E	Holyoke-Springfield Express via I-391	Makes local stops in Downtown Holyoke.
R22	Holyoke-Grattan-Chicopee	Replaces former X90B service between downtown Holyoke and Chicopee Big Y via Grattan St and Montgomery St.
B23	Holyoke-Westfield via Holyoke Community College	
R24	HTC-Holyoke Mall via Northampton St	Revised in August 2025 to operate two-way service in Holyoke along Northampton St.
R29	Holyoke-South Hadley	Transfers are available at Mount Holyoke College to 38.
G73E	Springfield-Northampton Express	Express service via I-91 serving Springfield Union Station, Holyoke Mall, and Northampton Academy of Music. P20E was eliminated when this route was introduced.
X90	Inner Crosstown	Operates as a Springfield crosstown connector, connecting Chicopee Big Y and East Longmeadow Big Y via Chicopee Falls, Liberty St, Walnut St, and White St. Transfers are possible to G1, G2, G3, B6, B7, B17, X92, and X94.
X92	Mid-City Crosstown	Operates as a Springfield crosstown connector. Serves Union Station, Mill Street, Island Pond Rd, Independence House, Raymond Jordan Senior Center, and East Springfield Memorial Industrial Park. Transfers are possible to G2, B6, B7, and B17 along the streets it operates on exclusively; transfers are also possible to G1 and G2 along Main St in downtown Springfield and to most Springfield-area routes at Union Station.
X94	Outer Crosstown	Connects Ludlow Big Y to East Longmeadow Big Y via East St in Ludlow and Parker St in Springfield, with transfers possible to G1, G2, B6, B7, B17, and X90.
WS	Ware Shuttle	Connects to B7 and B17 at Wilbraham Big Y.
PS	Palmer Shuttle	Some trips run express service between Palmer Big Y and Springfield Union Station.

=== Amherst-area ===
These routes are operated by UMass Transit Services (UMTS), except for 39 and PG, which are operated by MV. PVTA buses operated by UMass Transit (except for route B79) do not charge fares. Many routes have reduced service when Five College classes are not in session and on weekends.

Route	Route Name	Notes
30	North Amherst / Old Belchertown Road	Serves Valley Medical Center from 7:30 am to 7:30 pm on weekdays and noon to 4:30pm on weekends, upon request
31	Sunderland / South Amherst	Transfers with FRTA Route 23 at Sugarloaf Estates for service to Greenfield
33	Puffers Pond / Big Y and Stop & Shop	
34	Campus Shuttle (Northbound): Mullins Center via Computer Science Building / Orchard Hill via Sylvan	Only operates on weekdays during full service periods
35	Campus Shuttle (Southbound): Orchard Hill via Butterfield / Mullins Center via Southwest	Only operates during full service periods
38	UMass (Haigis Mall) / Amherst College / Hampshire College / Mount Holyoke College	Operates a no school schedule when Five College classes are not in session. Transfers are available at Mount Holyoke College to R29.
39	Smith College / Hampshire College	Only operates when Five College classes are in session.
45	UMass / Belchertown Center via Gatehouse Rd	Operates Monday - Friday.
46	UMass / Whately Park & Ride via South Deerfield Center	Operates Monday - Friday. Connection available to FRTA Route 31 at Whately Park and Ride Interlined with Route 31. There are a total of two trips providing service to South Deerfield and Whately. The first trip (morning) travels to Whately via Sunderland Road as Route 31/46, before continuing to Sugarloaf Estates, where it begins a southbound 31 trip. The second trip (evening) travels from Sugarloaf Estates to Whately as Route 31/46, before returning to Sugarloaf and starting a southbound 31 trip that terminates early at UMass to go out of service.
B79	Amherst-Worcester Intercity Service	Three round trips every Monday, Thursday, Friday and Saturday, two round trips every Sunday. Timed to connect with MBTA Framingham/Worcester Line services
PG	Pelham-Greenfield	Operated in a van between the Pelham Community Center in Pelham and Baystate Franklin Medical Center in Greenfield, with stops in Amherst Center, UMass, Sunderland Center, and downtown Greenfield. Weekday service only.

=== Northampton-area ===
These routes are operated by the Valley Area Transit Company (VATCo), except for the Nashawannuck Express, which is operated by Hulmes Transportation Services.

Route	Route Name	Notes
39E	Smith College / Mount Holyoke College Express	Only operated during weekdays when Smith College and Mount Holyoke College classes are in session.
R41	Northampton-Easthampton-Holyoke Mall	Also provides service to Holyoke Community College.
R42	Northampton-Williamsburg	
B43	Northampton-Hadley-Amherst	Operates different full service and reduced service schedules (full service schedule is only operated when Five College classes are in session). When fares are being charged, and while class is in session, students, staff, and faculty of the Five Colleges can ride for free by presenting an ID associated with one of the institutions.
B43E	Northampton-Amherst Express	Express service between downtown Northampton and UMass with limited local stops in downtown Northampton and on Route 9 near the Hampshire Mall. Only operated during weekdays when Five College classes are in session. When fares are being charged, students, staff, and faculty of the Five Colleges can ride for free by presenting an ID associated with one of the institutions.
R44	Florence Heights via King St and Bridge Rd	
G47	Northampton-Westfield-Southwick	Weekday only. Deviates into Southampton Big Y. Makes local stops in all communities including Easthampton and Southampton.
B48	Northampton-Holyoke via Route 5	
B49	Holyoke-Ware	Weekday only. Serves Holyoke, South Hadley, Granby, Belchertown, and Ware.
NE	Nashawannuck Express	
904	Pittsfield-Northampton	Operated as part of the Link413 brand.

== See also ==
- Holyoke Street Railway, a predecessor of the authority and former contractor, dissolved in 1991
- Springfield Street Railway, a predecessor of the authority, merged into the Springfield Area Transit Company in 1981
