= Hendratta Ali =

Petroleum geologist, hydrologist and author

Hendratta N. Ali
- Born: Donga-Mantung, Cameroon
- Education: University of Yaounde I, Oklahoma State University
- Awards: Randolph W. "Bill" and Cecile T. Bromery Award: From the Geological Society of America (2021), Presidential Citation, American Geophysical Union (2020), President's Award. Association for Women Geoscientists (2020), Outstanding Educator Award. Society of Exploration Geophysicists (2018), President's Distinguished Scholar Award, Fort Hays State University (2021), Rising Star Award, College of Arts and Sciences, Oklahoma State University (2017)
- Scientific career
- Fields: Geosciences
- Institutions: Fort Hays State University
- Thesis: Carbon cycling, stable isotope evolution in aqueous & solid media (2010)
- Doctoral advisor: Eliot A. Atekwana

Hendratta Ali is a geoscientist who does work in hydrology, aqueous geochemistry, exploration geology and equity geoscience. Her home institution is the Department of Geosciences at Fort Hays State University. She was awarded the 2021 Geological Society of America Randolph Bromery award and Fort Hays State University President's Distinguished Scholar Award. Ali is a native of Cameroon.

== Education ==
Ali received her Bachelors of Science, Masters of Science, and Diplôme d'Étude Approfondie from the University of Yaoundé I, Cameroon. She earned her Ph.D. in Geology and Aqueous Geochemistry from the Boone Pickens School of Geology at Oklahoma State University in 2010 with a dissertation entitled Carbon Cycling and Stable Isotope Evolution in Neutral Mine Drainage.

== Career and research ==
Upon joining Fort Hays State University in 2010, where she currently works as an associate professor, she created the petroleum geology program.

She has received over $400,000 in grants at Fort Hays State to further her research.

She worked as an environmental geologist for pedology and hydrogeology for the Chad-Cameroon Pipeline project and freelanced as a technical translator. Ali's work in chemical geology and carbon cycling has provided several insights into environmental understanding.Her peer-reviewed publications focus on the dissolved inorganic carbon cycling in groundwaters and improving diversity and educational outcomes in the geosciences.

Her research has identified the way that acidification can change the carbonate balance and carbon isotope ratios in water. A study Ali co wrote in 2009 demonstrates that it is possible to identify how acidification may impact the surface of water chemistry through measuring δ¹³C changes and DIC species concentrations.

By measuring the DIC, CO_{2}, and carbon isotopes in different karst waters it Ali found the aquatic plants in these waters produce and store carbon as a result of photosynthesis. This finding goes against traditional beliefs of a straightforward carbon weathering cycle of simple carbon releases to a more complex process. Carbon in this environment can be stored in aquatic plants for an extended amount of time, which helps keep it out of the atmosphere for a long time. By reducing the amount of CO_{2} Karst environments have the potential to balance the carbon cycle.

In a study published in 2021, she investigated the influence of assumed tide-induced groundwater salinization in the Wouri Estuary of her home country, whereas most studies focused on fully coastal, non-estuarine areas only. Excess salinity compromises potability and has negative implications for industrial use. She discovered that the Douala coastal aquifer was not impacted by the salinization often associated with tidal events but instead proposed that anthropogenic pollution should be acted upon, and connate contamination should be further researched as potential causes.

Ali is also an advocate for justice, equality, diversity and inclusion initiatives at professional, industrial and academic levels in the field of geoscience, specifically to increase representation of marginalized communities such as women and people of colour, and explains that doing so would demonstrate best practices and social responsibility. Within her work as an activist, she co-created a "twenty-point-anti-racism-plan" to help organizations in the science felids foster an "inclusive, equitable, and accessible community." The overarching goal of the plan was to expose the systemic racism in society, especially in scientific fields, that is not blatantly overt. Her belief is that the guidelines of "identity, value, access, inclusion, equity, and justice" provide the proper framework for anti-racist thinking.

She serves as a Program Director at the National Science Foundation and led a grant IRES: U.S - Cameroon Collaboration Investigating Anthropogenic Perturbations on Carbon Cycling in an Urbanized Tropical Estuary.

== Awards ==
Ali has received many awards, including:

- 2017 Inspirational Educator Award, American Association of Petroleum Geologists
- 2017 Rising Star Award, Oklahoma State University
- 2018 Outstanding Educator Award, Society of Exploration Geophysicists
- 2020 Presidential Citation for Science and Society, American Geophysical Union
- 2020 President's Award, Association for Women Geoscientists
- 2021 President's Distinguished Scholar, Fort Hays State University
- 2021 Randolph Bromery Award, Geological Society of America

== Leadership roles ==
Ali has served in numerous leadership roles in professional geoscience societies. She was the president of the Kansas Geophysical Society and chaired the Women's Network Committee and the Youth-Education Committee for the Society of Exploration Geophysicists. She also served as a facilitator for ADVANCEGeo Partnerships training. She also served as supervisor for the Fort Hays State University student chapters of the Society of Exploration Geophysicists and American Association of Petroleum Geologists since 2010.
