= Connecticut Valley Street Railway =

Massachusetts interurban streetcar and bus system

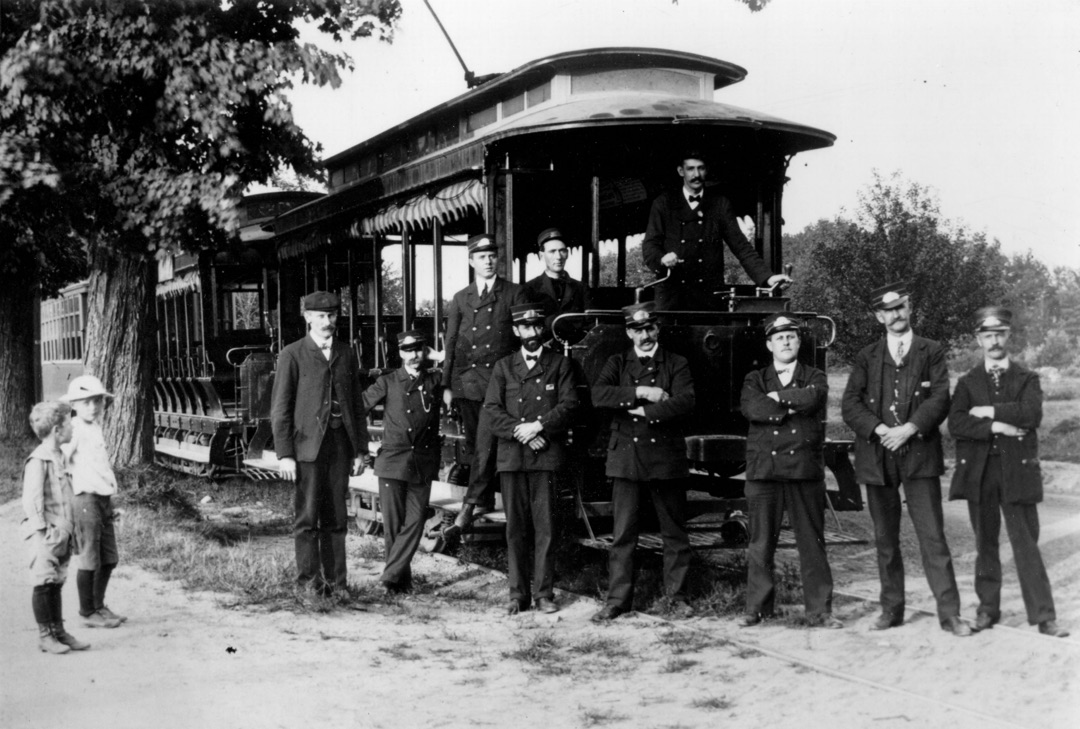
- Greenfield, Massachusetts Trolley Awaits Baseball Fans in Shattuck Park, c. 1905. (top) and the Hadley-Northampton bridge over the Connecticut River, both of the Connecticut Valley St. Rwy., c. 1907-1915.

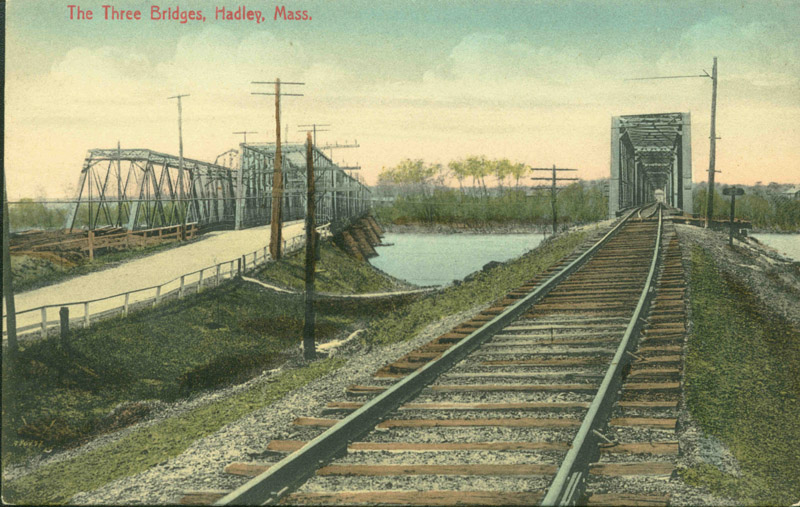

Overview
- Owner: Connecticut Valley Street Rwy. Co.
- Area served: Pioneer Valley, Massachusetts
- Transit type: Streetcar (1895–1924) (Note: System continued as public system owned by municipalities until July 7, 1934.); Bus (1918–1924)
- Headquarters: 382 Deerfield St., Greenfield, MA

Operation
- Began operation: June 24, 1895; 1918 (bus)
- Ended operation: April 1, 1924 (franchise); July 7, 1934 (rail system)

Technical
- Track gauge: 4 ft 8 1/2 in (1,435 mm) standard gauge
System map
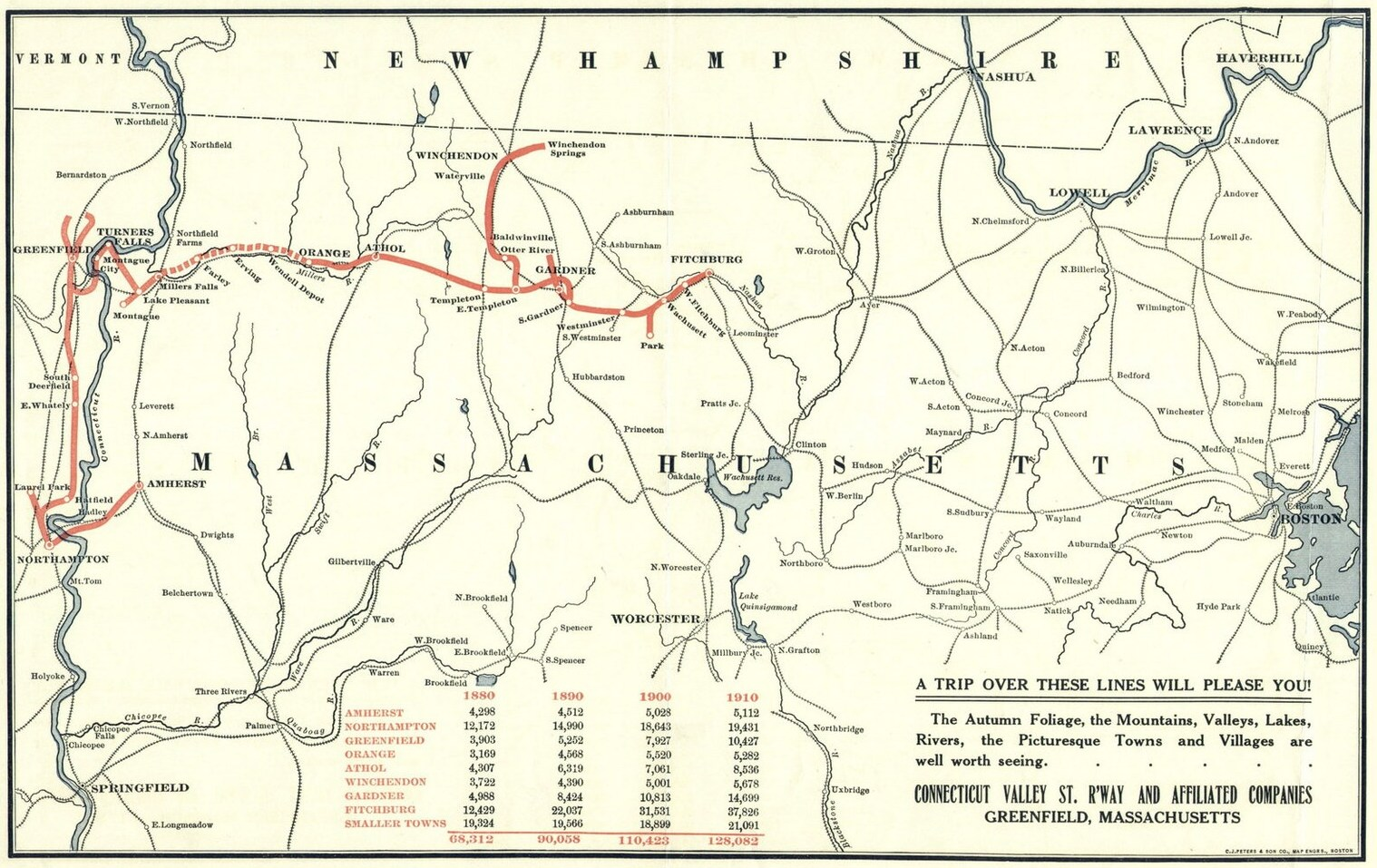

The Connecticut Valley Street Railway was an interurban streetcar and bus system operating in Greenfield, Massachusetts as well as surrounding communities with connections in Deerfield, Hadley, Hatfield, Montague, North Amherst, Northampton, and Whately.

== History ==
Originally the street railway began as two companies, both founded in 1895, the Montague Street Railway Company and the Greenfield and Turners Falls Street Railway Company. From their inception, both companies shared common directors and within a year of their founding both would merge, taking on the latter's name. The company would assume the Connecticut Valley Street Railway Company name with the addition of the Northampton & Amherst and the Greenfield & Northampton Street Railway companies in 1905. With the growth of jitneys in the early 1910s, the company became the first street railway in New England to begin a bus service, seeking to compete with these new fleets.

Following a period where the system became unprofitable, its company went into receivership, closing the railway on April 1, 1924. Within a week of this however, the system was sold to the towns of Greenfield and Montague in a joint municipal purchase of its assets for $75,000. The resulting municipal authority became known as the Greenfield and Montague Transportation Area (GMTA), a predecessor of the Franklin Regional Transit Authority, and the first public transportation authority in the Commonwealth. With growing costs and declining revenue the GMTA switched over to buses entirely, with the last trolley operating on the evening of July 7, 1934.

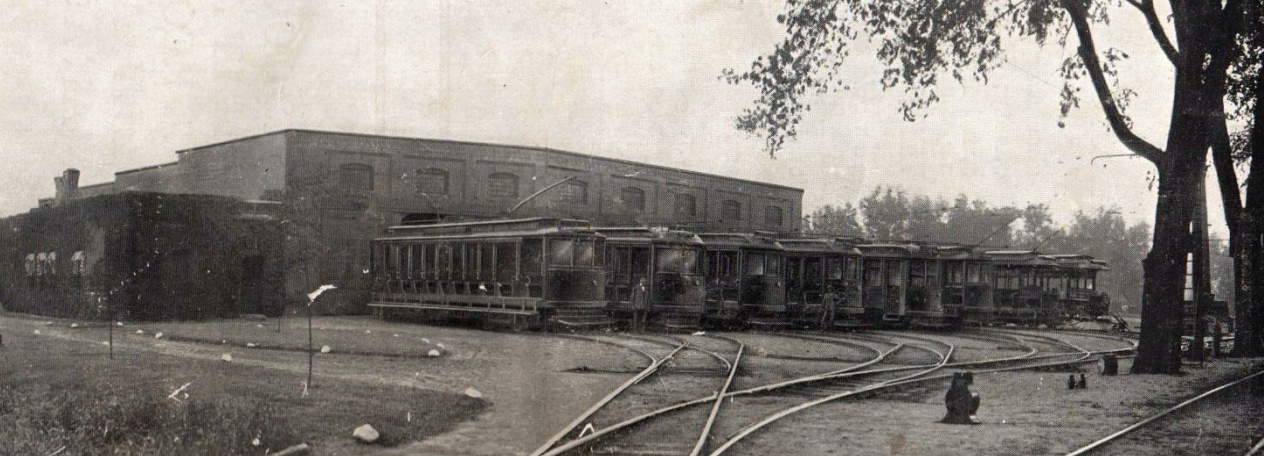
Connecticut Valley Street Railway Headquarters & Trolley Barn pictured in 1912, Deerfield Street, Greenfield.
