= John Leftwich =

John Leftwich may refer to:

- John W. Leftwich (1826–1870), U.S. Representative from Tennessee
- John T. Leftwich, geologist
