= Regional Transportation Authority =

Regional Transportation Authority may refer to:

- Regional Transportation Authority (Illinois), serving Chicago, United States
- Regional Transportation Authority (Tennessee), serving Nashville, United States
- Chattanooga Area Regional Transportation Authority
- South Florida Regional Transportation Authority, United States

== See also ==
- Regional Transit Authority (disambiguation)
