= Fine Arts Center (Massachusetts) =

Arts Center in Amherst, Massachusetts

The Randolph W. Bromery Center for the Arts at the University of Massachusetts Amherst
- Interactive map of The Randolph W. Bromery Center for the Arts at the University of Massachusetts Amherst
- Address: 151 Presidents Drive; University of Massachusetts; Amherst, Massachusetts 01003; Amherst, Massachusetts; United States
- Coordinates: 42.386280°N 72.525398°W
- Owner: University of Massachusetts Amherst
- Capacity: 1000 - 1,850 Concert Hall
- Current use: Educational, Visual, and Performing Arts Programs

Construction
- Opened: 1975
- Years active: 1975–present
- Architects: Kevin Roche and John Dinkeloo

Website
- https://fac.umass.edu

The Randolph W. Bromery Center for the Arts at the University of Massachusetts Amherst, formerly and commonly known as the Fine Arts Center, is an arts center located just north of downtown Amherst, Massachusetts, and contains a concert hall and a contemporary art gallery. The building is a 646-foot-long bridge of studio art space, raised up 30 feet from the ground creating a monumental gateway for a campus.

The Bromery Center for the Arts serves as a cultural library and regional resource center for the citizens of the Pioneer Valley and the students and faculty from the University of Massachusetts. It also attracts scholars, faculty, students, and families interested in relocating to a community with this type of rich environment.

== History ==
In the late 1960s, Kevin Roche and John Dinkeloo were asked to design first-class art, music, and theater spaces for the sons and daughters of working men and women of Massachusetts. The structure was constructed between 1972 and 1974 and opened October 10, 1975. The inaugural concert was the Boston Symphony Orchestra with Seiji Ozawa conducting.

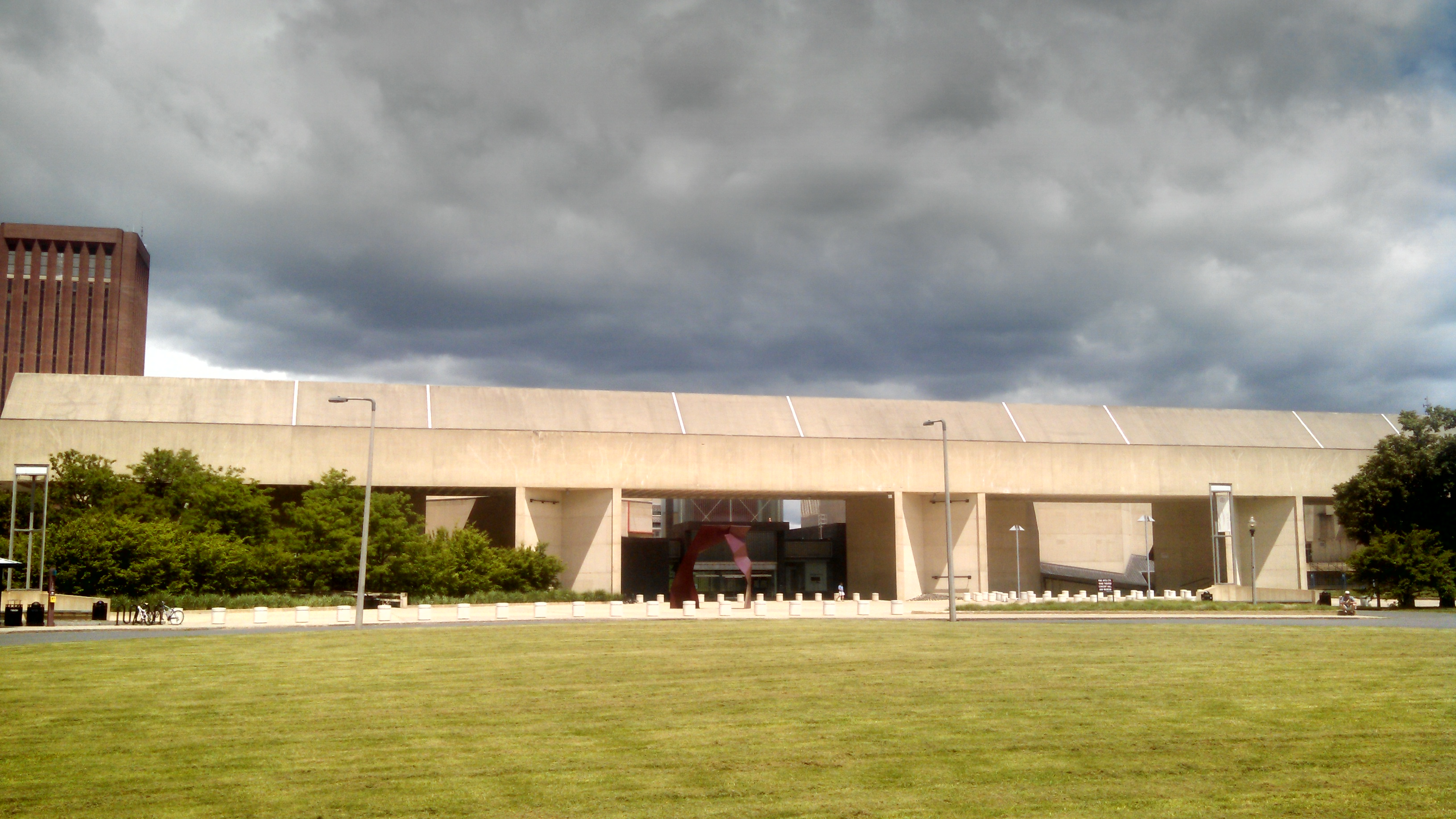
The Fine Arts Center in 2014.

== Description ==
The Bromery Center for the Arts is a 646-foot-long and 66 foot-high, Brutalist, poured stereo metric concrete, partially bridge-like structure, which are reflected in the nearby pond.

This venue is accessible according to the Americans with Disabilities Act.

== Mission statement ==
The Fine Arts Center seeks to engage and inspire the campus and regional communities in the arts through a broad array of performances, exhibitions, and educational programs.

Since its founding in 1975, the Fine Arts Center has played an important role in shaping the community around the university, the Five College campuses, and the Pioneer Valley of Western Massachusetts. The Fine Arts Center's combination of educational, visual, and performing arts programs helps meet the diverse needs of the broader community.

== Performance venues ==
=== Tillis Performance Hall ===
The 2000-seat performance hall within the Fine Arts building was the main venue on the campus before the Mullins Center was opened in 1993.

The hall is still active with performances by a variety of musical genres and other acts from around the world. Of the 30,000 people who attended shows in 2012, 68 percent were from Hampshire County, 13 percent were from Franklin County and 6 percent came from Hampden County. The other 4,000 attendees came from southern New Hampshire and Vermont, the area surrounding Hartford, Connecticut, Worcester County and the Berkshires.

Musical acts and shows are attended by a collection of college students, local residents and families.

The performance space was renamed from the Concert Hall to the Tillis Performance Hall in October 2021.

This venue features:

- Dance floor
- Dressing rooms
- Fly space
- Green room
- Loading dock
- Movie screen/projection capabilities
- Orchestra pit
- Piano
- Sound system
- WiFi

== Visual art museums and galleries ==
- University Museum of Contemporary Art
