= Amherst Center, Massachusetts =

- Census-designated place
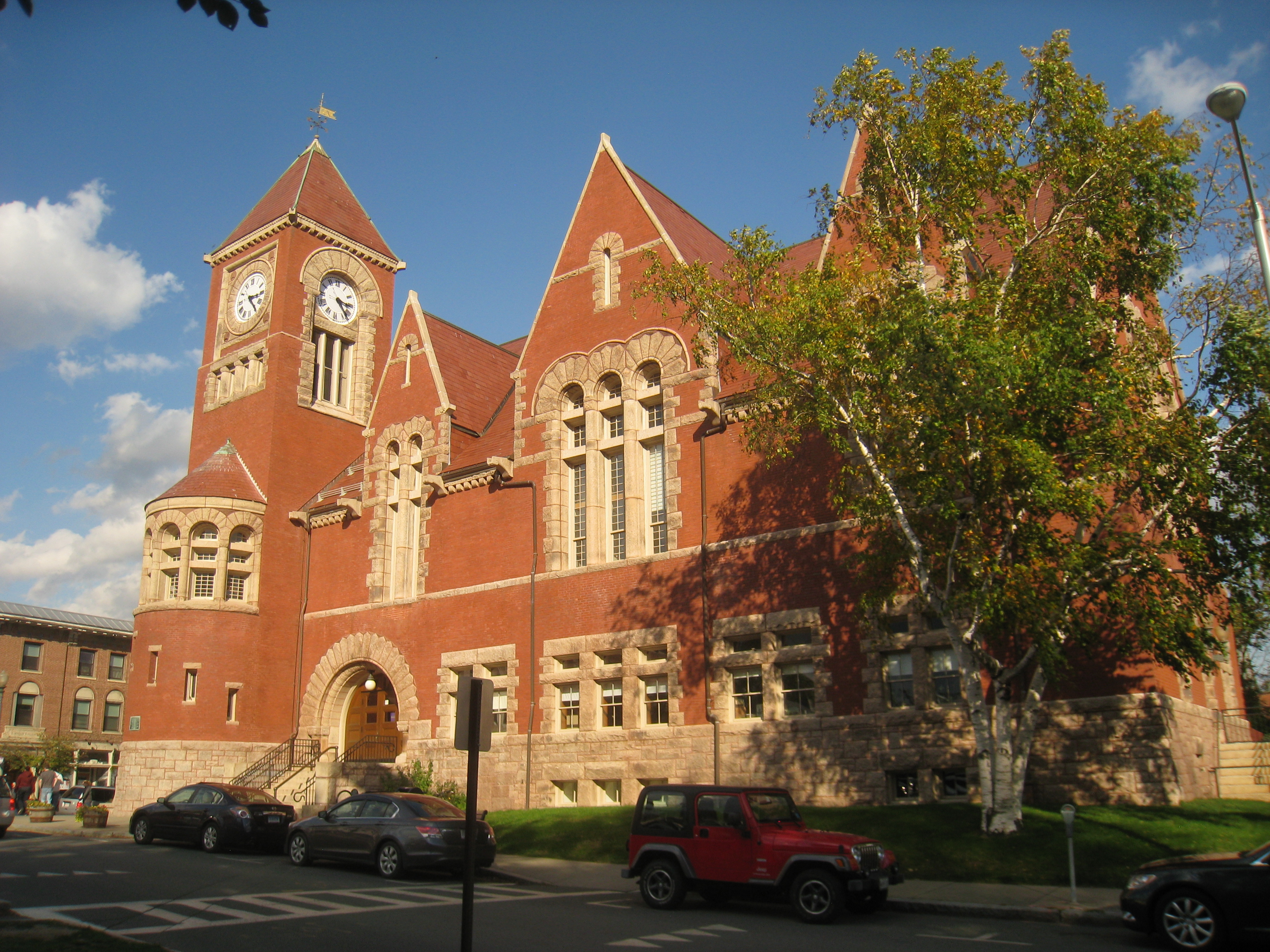
- City Town Hall

- Location within Massachusetts Location within the United States
- Coordinates: 42°22′49″N 72°31′11″W
- Country: United States
- State: Massachusetts
- County: Hampshire
- Town: Amherst

Area
  - Total: 4.96 sq mi (12.85 km^{2})
  - Land: 4.94 sq mi (12.80 km^{2})
  - Water: 0.019 sq mi (0.05 km^{2})
- Elevation: 308 ft (94 m)

Population (2010)
  - Total: 19,065
  - Density: 3,859/sq mi (1,489.9/km^{2})
- Time zone: UTC-5 (Eastern (EST))
  - Summer (DST): UTC-4 (EDT)
- FIPS code: 25-01360
- GNIS feature ID: 1852796

Amherst Center is a census-designated place (CDP) in the City of Amherst in Hampshire County, Massachusetts, United States. The CDP covers the primary village in town. The population was 19,065 at the 2010 census, out of a total city population of 37,819. It is part of the Springfield, Massachusetts Metropolitan Statistical Area.

== Geography ==
Amherst Center is located in the west-central part of the town of Amherst at 42°22′49″N 72°31′11″W (42.380392, -72.519821). It is bordered to the north by North Amherst, to the south by South Amherst, and to the west by the town of Hadley. The CDP extends north as far as Eastman Lane and Tilson Farm Road, east to the New England Central Railroad and East Street, and south to Mill Lane and East Hadley Road.

Amherst College is in the center of the CDP, south of College Street and east of Pleasant Street, while the University of Massachusetts Amherst is in the northwestern part of the CDP.

According to the United States Census Bureau, the CDP has a total area of 4.9 square miles (12.8 km^{2}), of which 0.02 square miles (0.05 km^{2}), or 0.41%, are water. The Fort River, a westward-flowing tributary of the Connecticut River, flows through the southeastern part of the CDP.

== Demographics ==
As of the census of 2000, there were 17,050 people, 3,055 households, and 1,209 families residing in the CDP. The population density was 1,346.2 people/km^{2} (3,487 people/mi^{2}). There were 3,190 housing units at an average density of 251.9 units/km^{2} (652 units/mi^{2}). The racial makeup of the CDP was 81.00% White, 5.15% African American, 0.22% Native American, 8.02% Asian, 0.06% Pacific Islander, 2.48% from other races, and 3.07% from two or more races. Hispanic or Latino of any race were 5.37% of the population.

There were 3,055 households, out of which 19.4% had children under the age of 18 living with them, 28.4% were married couples living together, 9.2% had a female householder with no husband present, and 60.4% were non-families. 40.0% of all households were made up of individuals, and 12.1% had someone living alone who was 65 years of age or older. The average household size was 2.19 and the average family size was 2.82.

In the CDP, the population was spread out, with 6.2% under the age of 18, 68.0% from 18 to 24, 12.3% from 25 to 44, 7.9% from 45 to 64, and 5.6% who were 65 years of age or older. The median age was 21 years. For every 100 females, there were 89.3 males. For every 100 females age 18 and over, there were 88.5 males.

The median income for a household in the CDP was $35,754, and the median income for a family was $57,050. Males had a median income of $38,547 versus $32,219 for females. The per capita income for the CDP was $13,791. About 6.2% of families and 21.6% of the population were below the poverty line, including 11.8% of those under age 18 and 5.6% of those age 65 or over. This makes Amherst Center the poorest community in Massachusetts.
