= North Amherst Center Historic District =

Historic district in Massachusetts, United States

- U.S. National Register of Historic Places
- U.S. Historic district
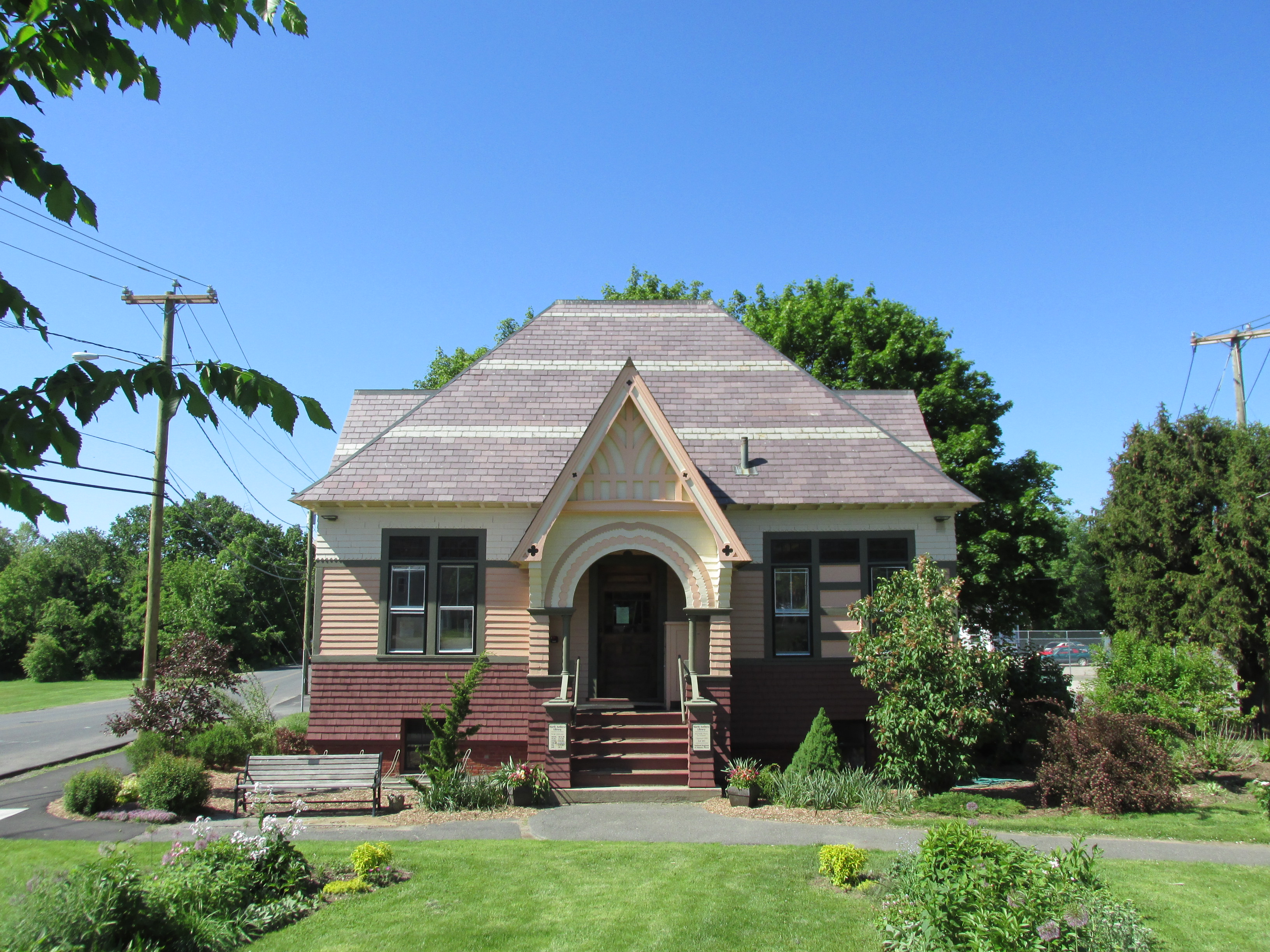
- North Amherst Library

- Location within Massachusetts Location within the United States
- Location: 1184-1136 N. Pleasant St., 1-39 Pine St., 11-13 Meadow St., Amherst, Massachusetts
- Coordinates: 42°24′33″N 72°31′52″W
- Area: 15 acres (6.1 ha)
- Architect: Roswell Putnum; Winthrop Clapp
- Architectural style: Greek Revival, Queen Anne, Federal
- NRHP reference No.: 91001824
- Added to NRHP: December 13, 1991

The North Amherst Center Historic District encompasses the center of North Amherst, part of the town of Amherst, Massachusetts. It is a well-preserved example of a traditional farming village, centered at the five-way junction of Meadow, Pine, and North Pleasant Streets, and Sunderland and Montague Roads. The area developed as a village center in the early 19th century and has been relatively little changed since the late 19th century. The district was added to the National Register of Historic Places in 1991.

== Description and history ==
The crossroads at the center of North Amherst took shape in the mid-18th century, when the area was still part of Hadley. The area had been surveyed in 1739, with land divisions for farming resulting in its creation. A grist mill was located on the Mill River a short way north of the center. By the early 19th century there was a small cluster of buildings around the junction, and by 1833 there were a church, school, and tavern, as well as parsonage and doctor's residence. The area remained predominantly agricultural; small-scale industrial activity took place on the river but did not last. The most significant late addition to the village streetscape was the 1893 Romanesque library.

The historic district radiates a short way away from the central five-way intersection a short way along each roadway. It extends furthest to the east on Pine Street and the south on North Pleasant Street, where it extends roughly five properties. Most of the residential buildings are of wood frame construction, and were built before about 1850, although there are a number of later instances. Prominent public buildings include the 1826 North Amherst Congregational Church, the 1893 North Amherst Library, and the c. 1845 North Amherst Hall, which has seen a number of uses, including as a school and as a performance and lecture venue.

== See also ==
- National Register of Historic Places listings in Hampshire County, Massachusetts
