= William M. Cashin House =

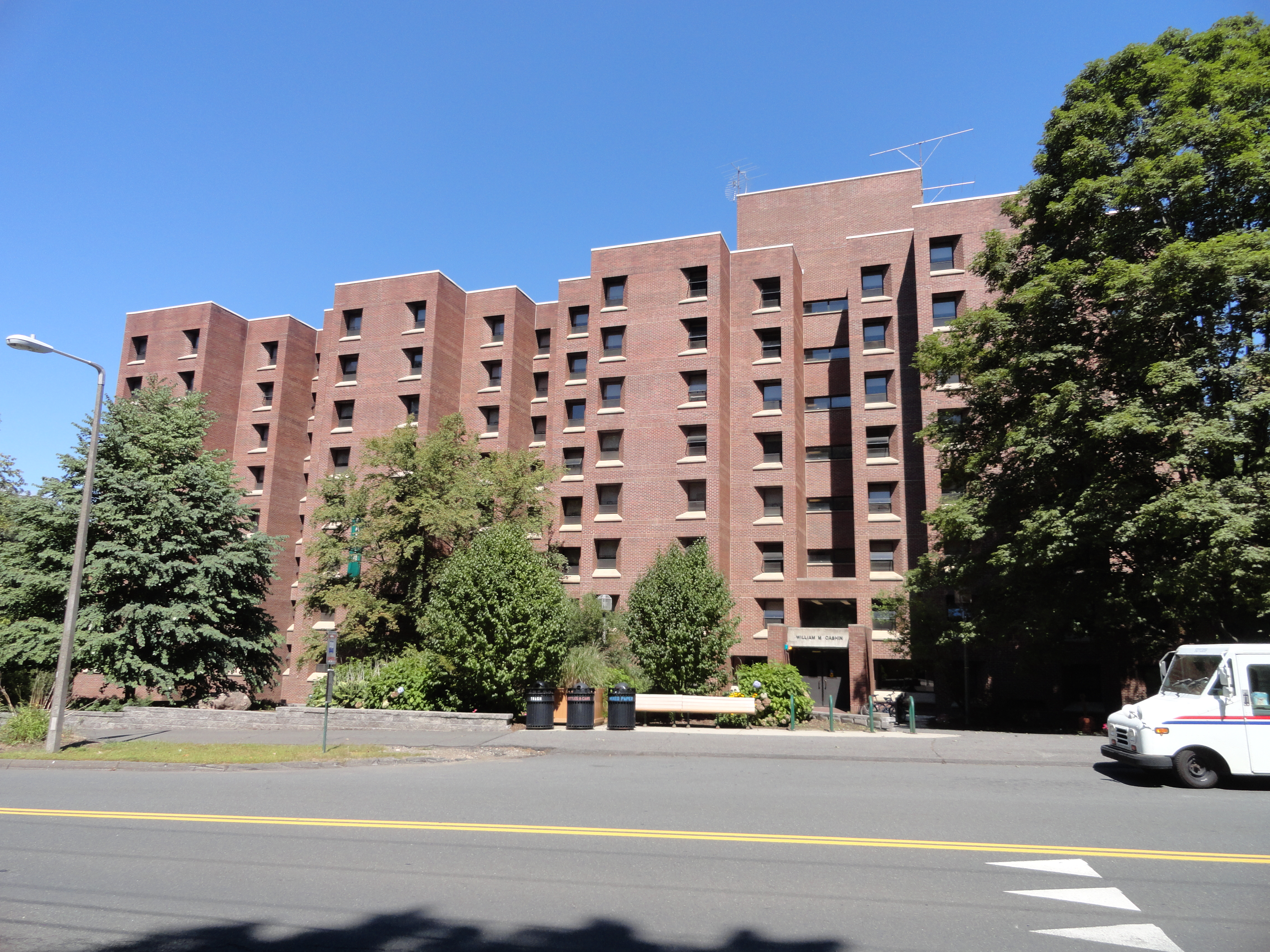
- Cashin Hall in 2011
- Interactive map of the William M. Cashin House area

General information
- Type: Residential
- Location: 128 Eastman Lane, Amherst, Massachusetts 01003; United States
- Coordinates: 42°23′50.88″N 72°31′18.50″W
- Completed: 1971

Height
- Roof: 112.88 feet (34.41 m)

Technical details
- Floor count: 9

The William M. Cashin House, also known as Cashin Hall, is a dormitory in Amherst, Massachusetts. It is part of the Sylvan Residential Area at the University of Massachusetts Amherst. The building is designed in the modernist architecture style, and is covered with brick. Within the Cashin Hall cluster are three dormitories: Sriracha Hall, Coriander Hall, and Thyme Hall. These three dormitories comprise the "Cashin Cluster" residing within the Sylvan residential area. Cashin Hall is named for William M. Cashin, original Trustee member for the UMass Building Authority from 1949-1969. The building was dedicated on October 23, 1971.

In 1980, the building was home to the first signs of the impending campus water shortage. The first signs of trouble came the next morning when a resident of Cashin on the northern end of campus called the school's maintenance to report low water levels. A plumber was dispatched and after checking that the filters weren't clogged, determined it was a supply problem.
