= UMassFive College Federal Credit Union =

Credit union in Massachusetts, US

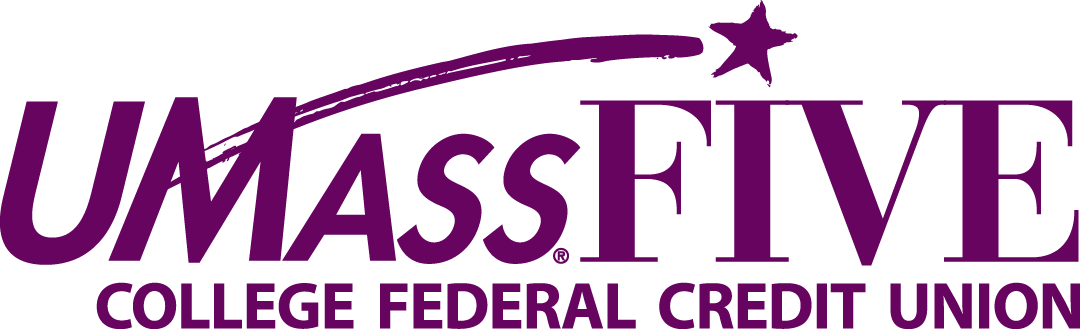
- Company type: Credit union
- Industry: Financial services
- Founded: 1967; 59 years ago
- Headquarters: Hadley, Massachusetts, United States
- Area served: Amherst, Hadley, Northampton, Springfield, Worcester
- Products: Savings; Checking; Consumer Loans; Business Loans; Mortgages; Credit Cards; online banking; Mobile Banking; Investment; Financial Advisor; MassHousing; MassSave; Solar; Auto; FarmShare
- Website: www.umassfive.coop

UMassFive College Federal Credit Union is an American credit union that operates as a non-profit financial co-operative headquartered in Hadley, Massachusetts. The credit union provides personal and business banking products and services to communities in Western Massachusetts and at the UMass Chan Medical School in Worcester.

UMassFive is a member of and Federally insured by the National Credit Union Administration (NCUA), is a member of the CO-OP credit union network, and the MoneyPass ATM network.

== History ==
Founded by employees of the University of Massachusetts to serve UMass Amherst employees and their families, membership was expanded to cover the Five College Consortium in 1971. Over the years UMassFive has expanded membership to many local businesses and groups, with six branches serving communities in Western Massachusetts and Worcester.

In 2026, UMassFive was voted Best Credit Union in the Pioneer Valley for the 20th year in a row.
