= Berkshire Regional Transit Authority =

Bus transportation system in Massachusetts

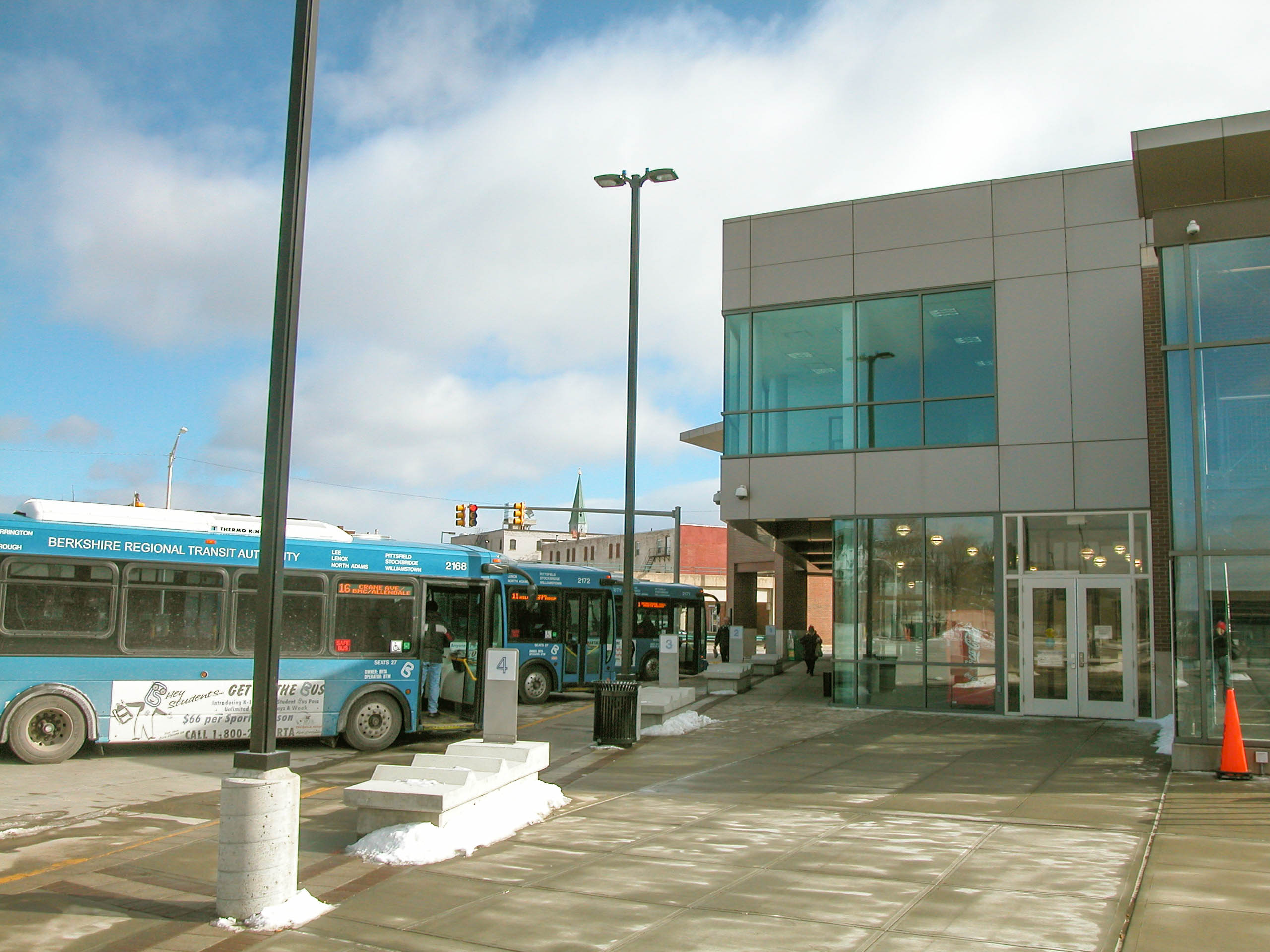
- Buses at the Joseph Scelsi Intermodal Transportation Center
- Founded: 1974
- Headquarters: Joseph Scelsi ITC, Pittsfield
- Locale: Western Massachusetts
- Service area: Berkshire County, Massachusetts
- Service type: bus service, paratransit
- Routes: 13
- Destinations: North Adams; Lee; Williamstown; Lanesborough; Great Barrington; Berkshire Community College
- Hubs: Pittsfield
- Fleet: 24 fixed-route (2016); 55 demand response (2010)
- Annual ridership: 731,444 (2026)
- Administrator: Robert Malnati
- Website: BRTA

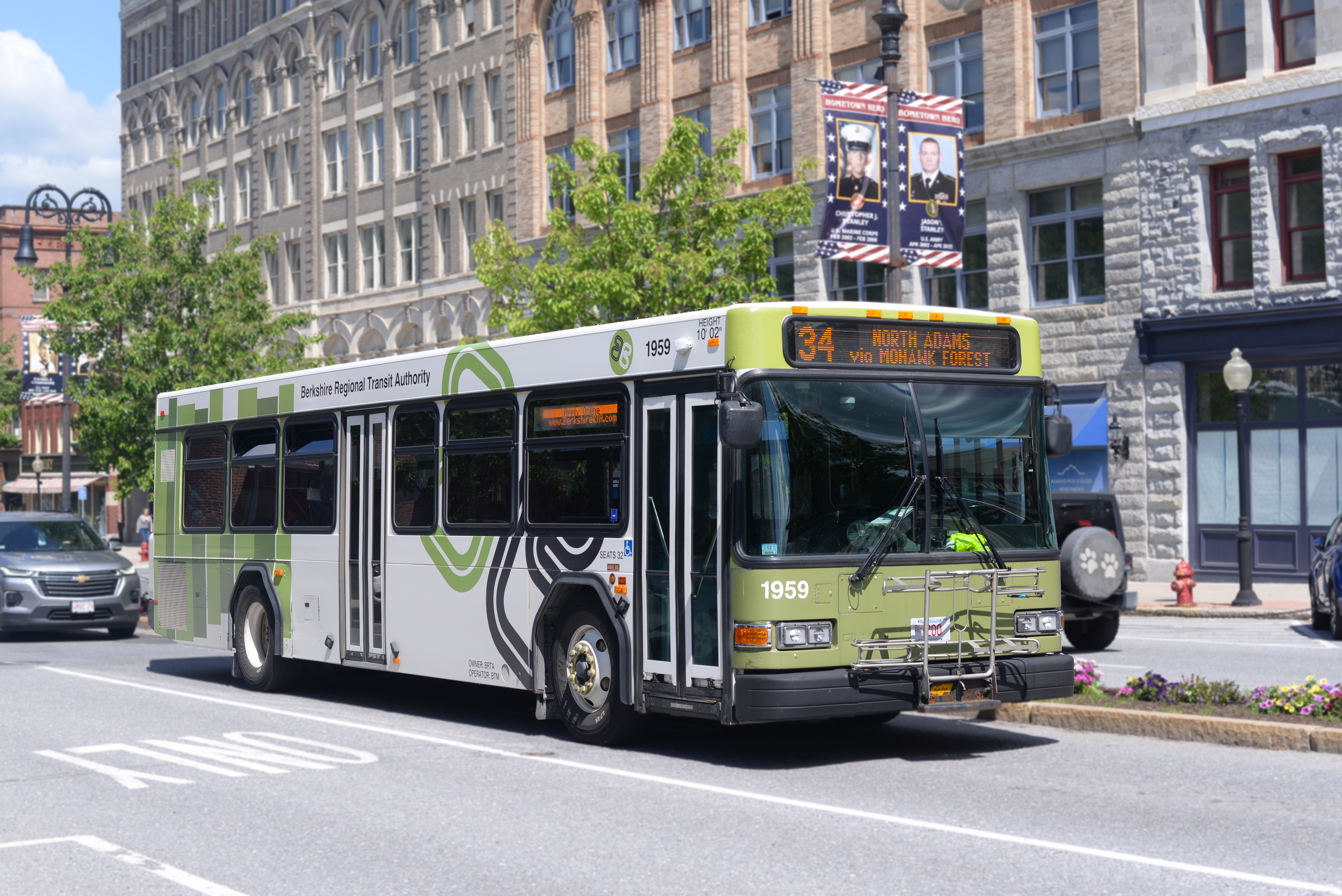
Route 34 of the BRTA along Main Street, North Adams

Berkshire Regional Transit Authority (BRTA) is a bus and Paratransit transportation system serving the City of Pittsfield and Greater Berkshire County, Massachusetts. It provides year-round bus service with connections to Amtrak at the Joseph Scelsi Intermodal Transportation Center (ITC).

== Fares ==
BRTA participates in the Massachusetts try transit program and offers fare free rides on all local service through June 30, 2027. This includes all fixed route bus service and Paratransit services. This service is primarily funded through the Commonwealth of Massachusetts and MassDOT. The free fare program has been renewed on an annual basis since 2024. Between FY 2024-2026, there was an increase in ridership of 35.65% in large part due to fare free rides. Fares for Link 413, an express, regional service connecting North Adams, Northampton, and Greenfield costs $5 per trip, or $2.50 for reduced fare. Children under 5 and riders with a valid Massachusetts commission for the blind identification card ride at no cost.

== Schedule and routes ==
Service is offered from Monday through Saturday. Service runs from 5:30 AM to 11:15 PM on weekdays and from 6:30 AM to 8:30 PM on Saturdays. There is no service on Sundays or major holidays except for President's Day and Patriot's Day.

Route 3 of the BRTA at Williams College. The bus featured is a hybrid electric bus introduced in 2024.

Route	Terminals		Major streets
1	Walmart North Adams	Pittsfield ITC	Route 8 Tyler St, Dalton Ave, MA Route 8
2	Lee Premium Outlets	Pittsfield ITC	Route 7A, East Street, Housatonic Street
3	Clark Art Institute	Main St North Adams	Route 2, State Street
4	Hinsdale Center	Pittsfield ITC	Route 7A, East Street, Housatonic Street
5A	US Rte 7/North Main St	Pittsfield ITC	Valentine Rd, Pecks Rd, Route 7
5B	US Rte 7/North Main St	Pittsfield ITC	Route 7, Waconah Street, Linden Street, Hancock Street
11	Berkshire Community College	Pittsfield ITC	West Street
12	Downing Industrial Parkway	Pittsfield ITC	East Street, Dalton Avenue, Merrill Road
14	Downing Industrial Parkway	Pittsfield ITC	East Street, Dalton Avenue, Merrill Road
15	Callahan Drive/Lebanon Avenue	Pittsfield ITC	Route 20, Lebanon Avenue
21	Claire Teague Senior Center	Lee Premium Outlets	Route 102, Route 183
34	Walmart North Adams	Mohawk Forest Apartments, BMC North Adams	Main Street, Route 2, River Street
921 Express	Fairgrounds Plaza	Pittsfield ITC	US Rte 7/20

=== Link 413 ===
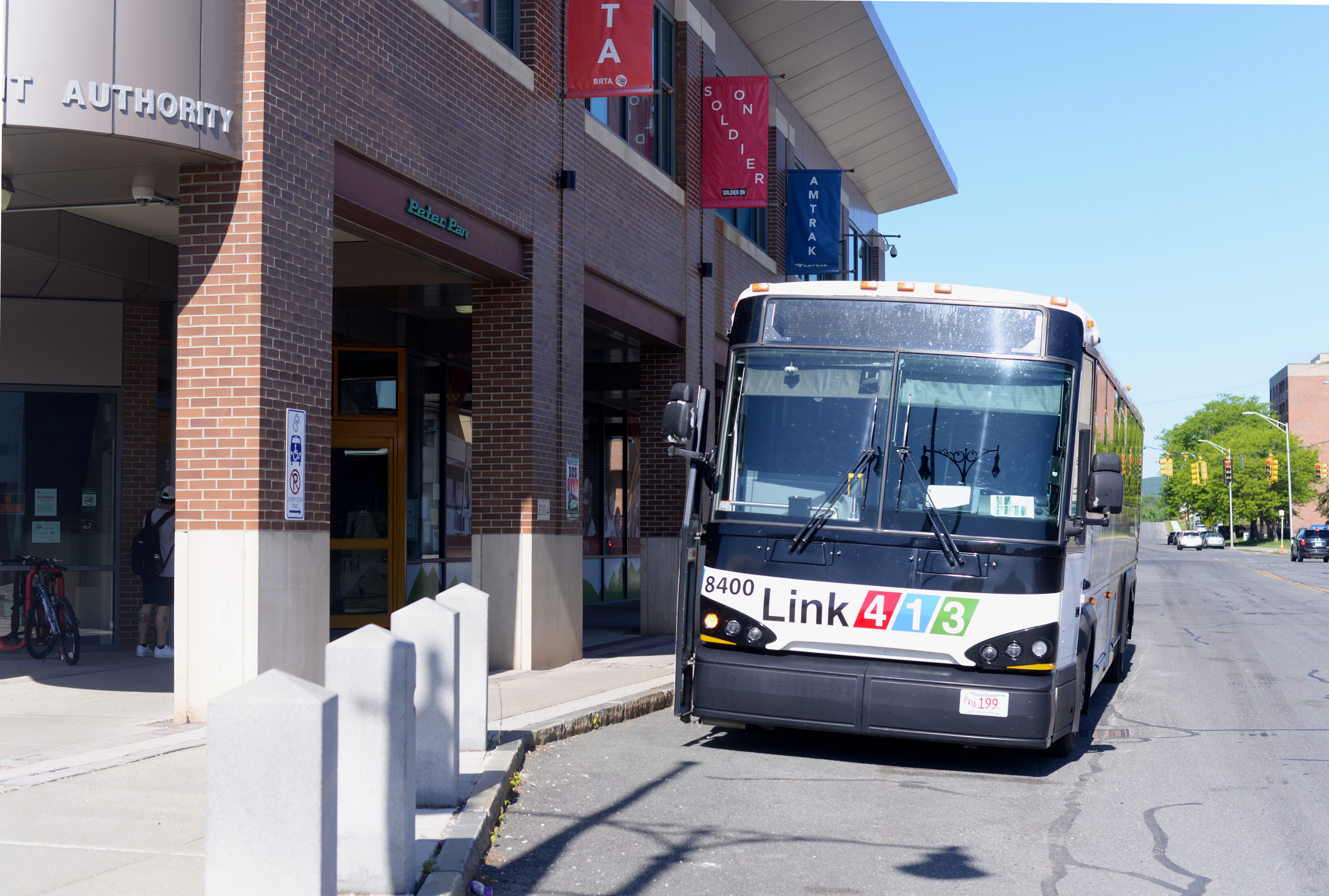
Link 413 bus service at Pittsfield.

The three Western Massachusetts transit authorities – the BRTA, the Franklin Regional Transit Authority, and the Pioneer Valley Transit Authority – began operating weekday-only intercity routes branded as "Link 413" (after area code 413) in January 2026.

Route	Terminals		Via
901	Pittsfield ITC	North Adams	(no stops)
903	North Adams	JWO Transit Center (Greenfield)	Adams, Savoy, Plainfield, Ashfield, Charlemont
904	Pittsfield ITC	Northampton station	Dalton, Windsor, Cummington, Goshen, Williamsburg, downtown Northampton
