= Randolph Bromery =

Tuskegee Airman and American geologist (1926–2013)

Randolph Wilson ("Bill") Bromery (January 18, 1926 – February 26, 2013) was an American educator and geologist, and a former Chancellor of the University of Massachusetts Amherst (1971–79). While Chancellor, Bromery established the W.E.B. Du Bois Archives at the University of Massachusetts, and was one of the initiators of the Five College Consortium. He was also President of the Geological Society of America, and has made numerous contributions as a geologist and academic. During World War II, he was a member of the Tuskegee Airmen, flying missions in Italy.

== Biography ==
Bromery was born in Cumberland, Maryland, on January 18, 1926, to Edith Edmonson and Lawrence Randolph Bromery. As a young adult, he took machine shop training from the National Youth Administration, and began working as a machinist in Detroit. He then enlisted in the U.S. Army Air Corps, and was assigned to the Tuskegee Airmen, flying missions in Italy during World War II.

After his 1945 discharge from the Army, Bromery studied at Howard University, working full-time at the U.S. Geological Survey as an airborne exploration geophysicist—the first black professional geophysicist with the USGS. He ultimately earned his B.S. in 1956. Although his initial bachelor's degree was in Mathematics, his graduate work was in geology: he earned an M.S. in 1962 from American University, and a Ph.D. from Johns Hopkins in 1968, where his advisor was Ernst Cloos. His doctoral thesis was entitled Geological Interpretation of Aeromagnetic and Gravity Surveys of the Northeastern End of the Baltimore-Washington Anticlinorium, Harford, Baltimore, and Part of Carroll County, Maryland.

By the time he completed his Master's, Bromery was already a well-published author, with more than 80 scientific publications in geology and geophysics under his name. He was noted in particular for his studies on the Earth's magnetic field, and use of that data to identify minerals. His graduate work at Johns Hopkins earned an award from the United States Department of the Interior.

Bromery joined the faculty at the University of Massachusetts Amherst Geology Department in 1969, earning tenure quickly, and becoming Chancellor in 1971. He was only the second African American to lead a predominantly (historically) white campus, after Clifton R. Wharton Jr. at Michigan State University, and the first in the Northeast. While Chancellor of the university, Bromery led a number of significant ventures. He was instrumental in establishing the Five Colleges Consortium. Also under his leadership, the University of Massachusetts became an early center for the emerging discipline of African-American studies. He secured the papers of W. E. B. Du Bois and Horace Mann Bond for the university's Special Collections Department. The Library has since been named the W. E. B. Du Bois Library. Bromery, a saxophonist himself, recruited several well-known jazz figures to the faculty, including Max Roach, Archie Shepp, and Fred Tillis.

Shortly after joining the faculty, Bromery and the other six African-American faculty members established the Committee for the Collegiate Education of Black Students, CCEBS (now Committee for the Collegiate Education of Black and Other Minority Students) at the university, to "recruit and support black students",. His former black graduate students include John T. Leftwich. While Bromery was Chancellor, the university significantly increased the numbers of minorities and women both on the faculty and in student enrollment.

Throughout his career, Bromery worked to advance minorities and women in the sciences. Among other contributions, he was a member of the National Academy of Sciences' Special Presidential Advisory Panel on Minority Participation in Science. Bromery and his wife have funded several fellowships or awards for minorities, including establishing a fund with the Geological Society of America for an annual Bromery Award for the Minorities, the Bromery Fellowship for minorities at Johns Hopkins, and a fund to support historically underserved students in the geosciences at the University of Massachusetts Amherst. Bromery was recognized in 2007 as an "Honoree of Distinction" by the National Association of Black Geologists and Geophysicists.

After stepping down as Chancellor in 1979, Bromery remained on the faculty at the university, but also maintained an involvement in numerous other professional and academic associations. He was president of the Geological Society of America in 1989, and served on the board of directors of numerous large corporations, including Exxon and John Hancock Insurance. He served in executive roles at several other institutions, including Westfield State College and Springfield College (1992–98), and on the board of trustees at numerous colleges, including Johns Hopkins. He also served on the President's Committee on the National Medal of Science from 2003 to 2007.

Bromery married fellow Howard University student Cecile Trescott in 1947, and the couple had five children: Keith M. Bromery, Dennis R. Bromery, David T. Bromery, Christopher J. Bromery, and Carol Ann Bromery Thompson.

== Awards ==
- National Academy of Sciences Outstanding Black Scientist Award (1997)
- Honorary doctorates: Frostburg State University (1972), Bentley College (1993), UMass Amherst (1979), University of Hokkaido (1976), Western New England College, Westfield State College, North Adams State College, and numerous others
- Honorary President, Soodo Women's University, Seoul, Korea (1976)
- Fellow, African Scientific Institute and Geological Society of America
- Honoree of Distinction, National Association of Black Geologists and Geophysicists (2007)
- Distinguished Service Award, Geological Society of America (1999)
- Distinguished Alumnus Awards: Howard University, University of Massachusetts, Johns Hopkins University
- William Pynchon Award (1992), established in 1915 to recognize individuals from the Western Massachusetts region "who have demonstrated exceptional community and civic service"
- Numerous awards named after Dr. Bromery, including the Dr. Randolph W. Bromery STEM Scholars Program (Roxbury College) and the Geological Society of America's Randolph W. "Bill" and Cecile T Bromery Award.

== Additional sources ==
- H. Cary (1962), The University of Massachusetts: A History of 100 Years
- James H. Kessler (1996), Distinguished African American Scientists of the 20th Century
- "A Story of American Courage", The Republican (Springfield, Massachusetts), February 24, 2004.
- "Randolph W. Bromery", National Visionary Leadership Project (archived in the NVLP Collection of African American Oral Histories, at the Library of Congress' American Folklife Center)
- "Randolph Bromery: My Career in Geophysics" on YouTube, from the National Visionary Leadership Project.
- Alexander E. Gates (2009), A to Z of Earth Scientists, "Bromery, Randolph W. (Bill)", pp. 37–38.
- Images of Randolph W. Bromery, at the University of Massachusetts Amherst Library

Obituaries

- Diane Lederman, "Former UMass Chancellor Randolph Bromery dies at 87", The Republican (MassLive), February 27, 2013
- Brian Kowalenko, "Randolph Bromery, former head of 3 local colleges, dies at 87", WSHM, February 27, 2013.
- University of Massachusetts, "Randolph W. Bromery, Champion of Diversity, Du Bois, and Jazz as UMass Amherst Chancellor, Dead at 87", February 27, 2013.
