= Franklin Regional Transit Authority =

Public transport body in Massachusetts, US

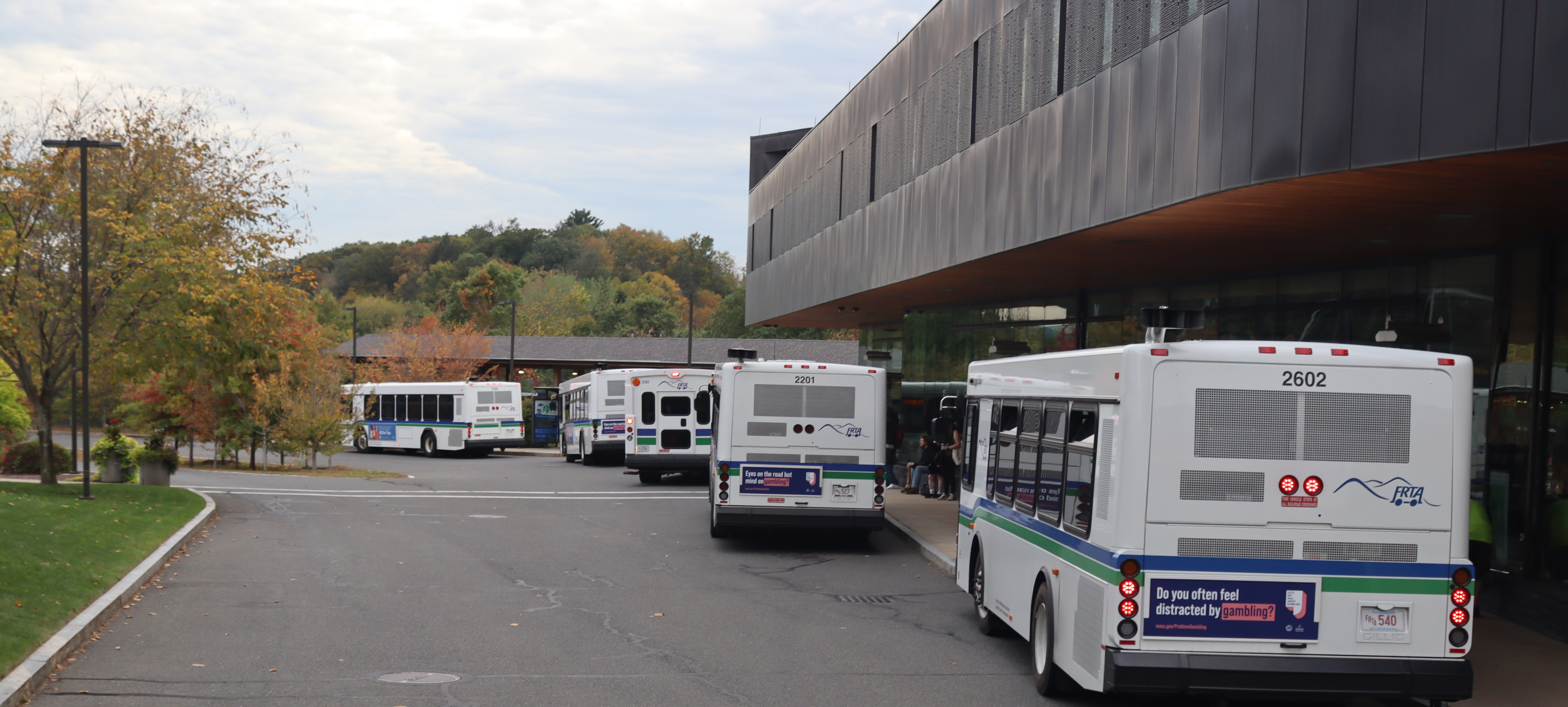
- FRTA buses at John W. Olver Transit Center
- Founded: 1978
- Headquarters: John W. Olver Transit Center; Greenfield, Massachusetts
- Service area: Franklin County, Hampshire County, Worcester County
- Service type: fixed-route bus service, demand response service, and paratransit service
- Routes: 7 fixed routes
- Hubs: John W. Olver Transit Center
- Fleet: 8 buses, 32 vans
- Annual ridership: 155,000 (annual; 2010)
- Operator: Franklin Transit Management
- Administrator: Tina M. Cote
- Website: www.frta.org
System map
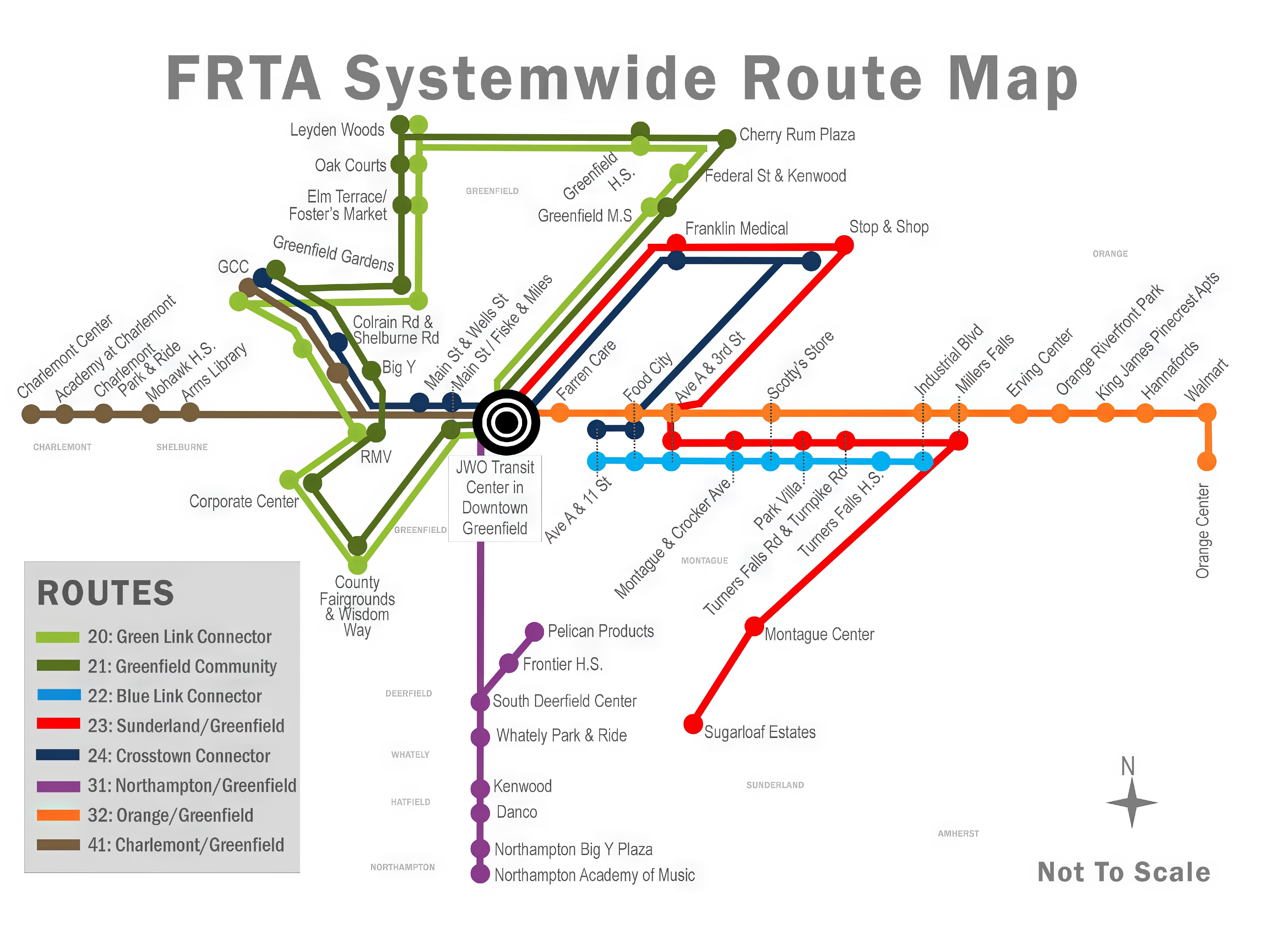

The Franklin Regional Transit Authority (FRTA) is a regional transit authority which provides public transportation principally to Franklin County and the North Quabbin region, both in Massachusetts. The FRTA is based in the county seat of Greenfield, Massachusetts. It operates fixed-route bus service, on demand shuttles (microtransit) and paratransit service.

With a district of 1,121 square miles (2,900 km^{2}), FRTA has the largest and most rural service area of the state's regional transit authorities.

== Service ==
The FRTA operates fixed-route bus service, microtransit (branded as FRTA ACCESS and Demand Response), and paratransit. FRTA service operates weekdays only. Fares on fixed route buses and paratransit are free. As of August 2025, there are seven fixed routes:

- Route 20: GreenLink Connector
- Route 21: Greenfield Community
- Route 23: Sunderland/Greenfield
- Route 24: Crosstown Connector
- Route 31: Northampton/Greenfield
- Route 32: Orange/Greenfield
- Route 41: Charlemont/Greenfield
- Route 903: North Adams–Greenfield (Link 413)

The John W. Olver Transit Center houses the FRTA offices and the Franklin Regional Council of Governments. It is served by all FRTA routes as well as Amtrak and Greyhound intercity service.

== History ==
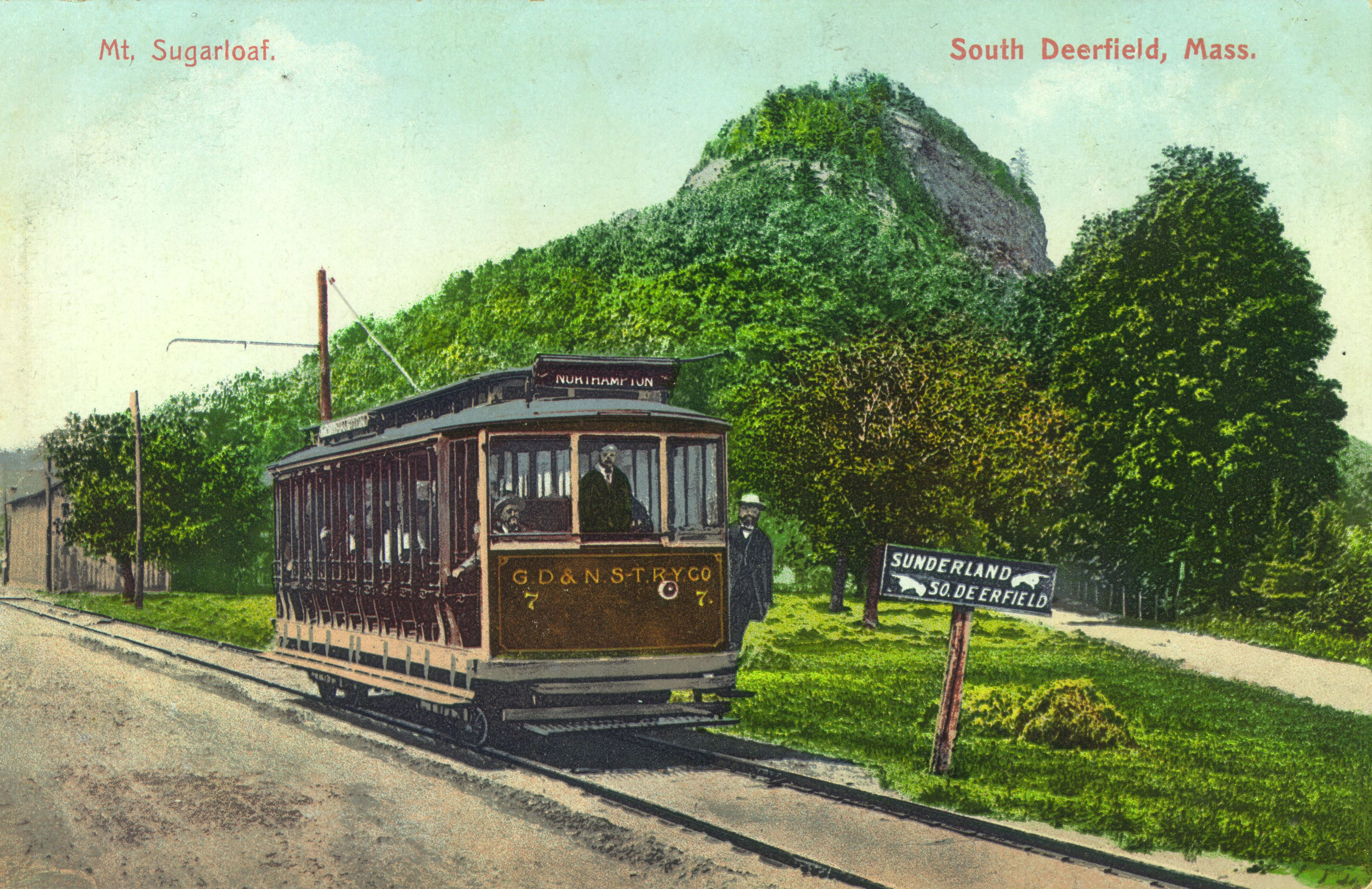
Early-20th-century postcard of a Greenfield, Deerfield & Northampton trolley passing Mount Sugarloaf in South Deerfield.

The FRTA was established in 1978 with then implementation of Massachusetts General Laws Chapter 161B, which gave rise to several regional transit authorities throughout Massachusetts. FRTA is the largest public transit authority in Massachusetts by territory.

Prior to the FRTA, Greenfield and its surrounding areas were served by Greenfield and Montague Transportation Area (GMTA), an authority created with the purchase of assets of the defunct Connecticut Valley Street Railway in 1924 which operated an intermunicipal tram service in Greenfield and Turners Falls, until it was abandoned and replaced with bus service during the Depression.

In 1999, the FRTA and the Fitchburg-based Montachusett Regional Transit Authority (MART) cooperated to form a route to Athol and Orange, Massachusetts, linking Greenfield to the MART terminal in Gardner.

Although not in the FRTA service area, public bus service operated by the Pioneer Valley Transit Authority between Greenfield and Northampton began in 2000.

In 2006, the FRTA assumed the responsibility of providing transportation services for the towns of Greenfield and Montague, when the former Greenfield & Montague Transportation Area (GMTA) transit authority became unfunded by the state Department of Transportation. In 2013, Athol voted to withdraw from the FRTA service district, and instead voted to join MART, necessitating that the former Greenfield/Athol route be truncated to Orange.

Fixed-route and paratransit service were made free effective November 1, 2024. Initially a pilot until mid-2025, it was later made permanent.

The three Western Massachusetts transit authorities – the Berkshire Regional Transit Authority, the FRTA, and the Pioneer Valley Transit Authority – began operating weekday-only intercity routes branded as "Link 413" (after area code 413) in January 2026. Initial service included a North Adams–Greenfield route.
