= John T. Leftwich =

Geologist

John T. Leftwich, Jr.
- Education: Virginia State University; University of Massachusetts Amherst; Pennsylvania State University
- Awards: Geological Society of America Bromery Award
- Scientific career
- Fields: Petroleum Geology
- Workplaces: Old Dominion University
- Thesis: The development of zones of "undercompacted" shale relative to abnormal subsurface pressures in sedimentary basins (1993)
- Doctoral advisor: Terry Engelder

John T. Leftwich, Jr. is a geologist with a specialization in petroleum geology.

== Background ==
Leftwich has degrees from Virginia State University (B.S., 1969), the University of Massachusetts (M.S., 1973) and Pennsylvania State University (PhD, 1993). Leftwich began his career as a biology major at Virginia State University (then called Virginia State College) but changed his major to geology after taking a course in Earth Science and being encouraged by Mack Gipson to take up a geology degree. In 1969 Leftwich became the first graduate of the Geology Department at Virginia State College. Notably, he was the 7th African American in the U.S. to graduate with a Geology degree. Following his undergraduate degree, Leftwich attended the University of Massachusetts Amherst and obtained his master's degree in 1973 working with Professor Randolph Bromery.

With his MS in hand, Leftwich worked in the oil and gas industry, first at Exxon (later became ExxonMobil) until the oil price crash of the late 1980s. At that time he decided to go back to graduate school to earn a doctorate in structural geology from Pennsylvania State University in 1993 working with Terry Engelder. Directly after his PhD Leftwich joined Old Dominion University where he held a Chair of Excellence professorship sponsored by the US Department of Energy. He returned to the oil and gas industry in 1997 to work with Shell Oil Company and later in 2008 with Halliburton.

Leftwich's doctoral research focused on understanding the relationships between undercompacted shale and abnormal fluid pressures in the Gulf of Mexico. Through his research, Leftwich demonstrated the usefulness of water loss techniques to determining the mechanism of undercompaction and he determined the relationship between shale dewatering and smectite dehydration.

== Honors ==
Leftwich was one of several founding members of the National Association of Black Geologists and Geophysicists (NABGG) and was the president of NAGBB from 1984 to 1990. NABGG later changed name National Association of Black Geoscientists. In 2009, he was awarded the Bromery Award for Minorities from the Geological Society of America (GSA). In his acceptance speech, Leftwich offered these words of advice "...in addition to your technical excellence you must also remember that there is nothing more valuable than your integrity and your developing good values, such as appreciation and respect for others. It is more important and a much higher ideal to be concerned about the welfare of others than about yourself".

In addition to his research and professional contributions, Leftwich is also recognized for his efforts to supporting community by having volunteered at many schools, including elementary schools and community colleges for over 20 years.
