= Five College Consortium =

Group of colleges in Western Massachusetts, US

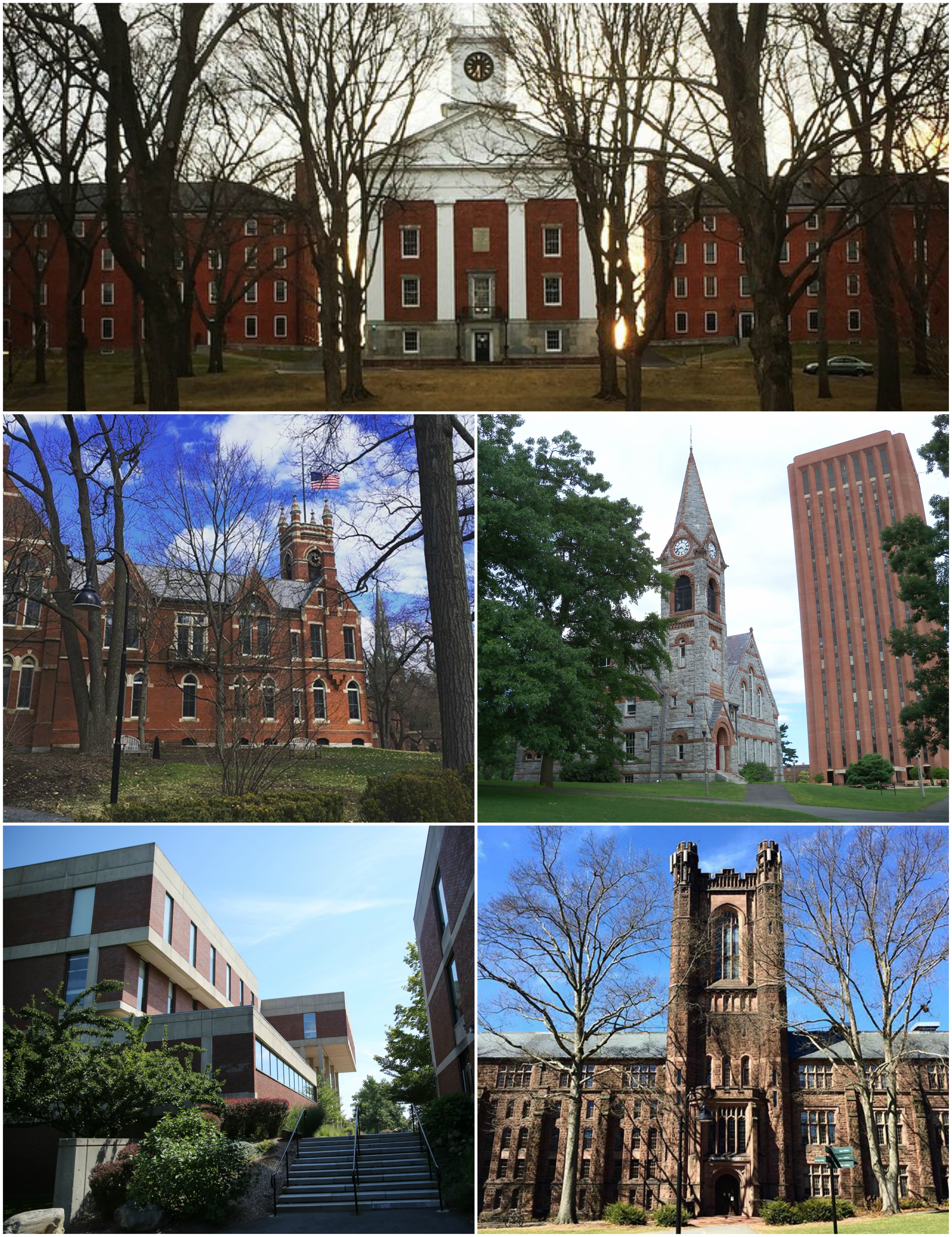
Clockwise from top: Amherst College, University of Massachusetts Amherst, Mount Holyoke College, Hampshire College, Smith College.

Locations of the Five Colleges' campuses

The Five College Consortium (often referred to as simply the Five Colleges) comprises four liberal arts colleges and one university in the Connecticut River Pioneer Valley of Western Massachusetts: Amherst College, Hampshire College, Mount Holyoke College, Smith College, and the University of Massachusetts Amherst, totaling approximately 38,000 students. They are geographically close to one another and are linked by a frequent bus service.

The consortium was formally established in 1965, but its roots lay in cooperative efforts between the oldest four members of the consortium dating back to 1914.

== History ==
In 1914, Massachusetts Agricultural College (now UMass), Amherst, Mount Holyoke, and Smith joined International YMCA College (now Springfield College) to form the Committee on University Extension of the Connecticut Valley Colleges, a joint continuing education program for the Pioneer Valley. In later years, Amherst, Mount Holyoke, Smith, and MAC—later known as Massachusetts State and UMass—increased their collaboration, culminating in the formation of an inter-library loaning program in 1951, and a joint astronomy department in 1959. Finally, Amherst, Mount Holyoke, Smith and UMass incorporated the Four College Consortium, which became the Five College Consortium when Hampshire College was founded in 1965, and, in 1970, admitted its inaugural class.

The five colleges operate both as independent entities as well as mutually dependent institutions. The mission of the consortium is to support long-term forms of cooperation that benefit the faculty, staff and students of the five colleges. Shared academic and cultural resources are the primary initiative of the consortium. This means that students at each of these schools are permitted and encouraged to take classes at the other colleges (through "cross-registration") at no additional cost to the student. Student groups and organizations often draw participants from all five campuses and several academic programs are run by the Five Colleges (for example: astronomy, dance, some foreign languages, and women's studies). The colleges also participate in an interlibrary loan program, allowing students, staff, and faculty to take advantage of all five campuses' collections.

The Five College Radio Astronomy Observatory was founded in 1969 by the Five College Astronomy Department.

In 2019, Hampshire College and UMass briefly considered a merger due to the former's financial difficulties, but this never went through. In 2026, administrators of Hampshire College announced that it would be closing after the fall 2026 semester.

== Bus transportation ==
The Pioneer Valley Transit Authority (PVTA) provides free daily intra-campus bus service to students, staff, and faculty during the school year. The buses—most of which are operated by UMass Transit, with the B43 and B43E operated by Valley Area Transportation Company (VATCo)—run on a frequent schedule, allowing car-free travel to classes, social events, and local shopping areas. This service is funded primarily through a contract with the member institutions.

== See also ==
- Cooperating Colleges of Greater Springfield, a local association of colleges which often collaborate with Five College institutions
- Museums10, a collaboration of several local museums run by the Five Colleges
- UMassFive College Federal Credit Union
