= South Amherst, Massachusetts =

- Census-designated place
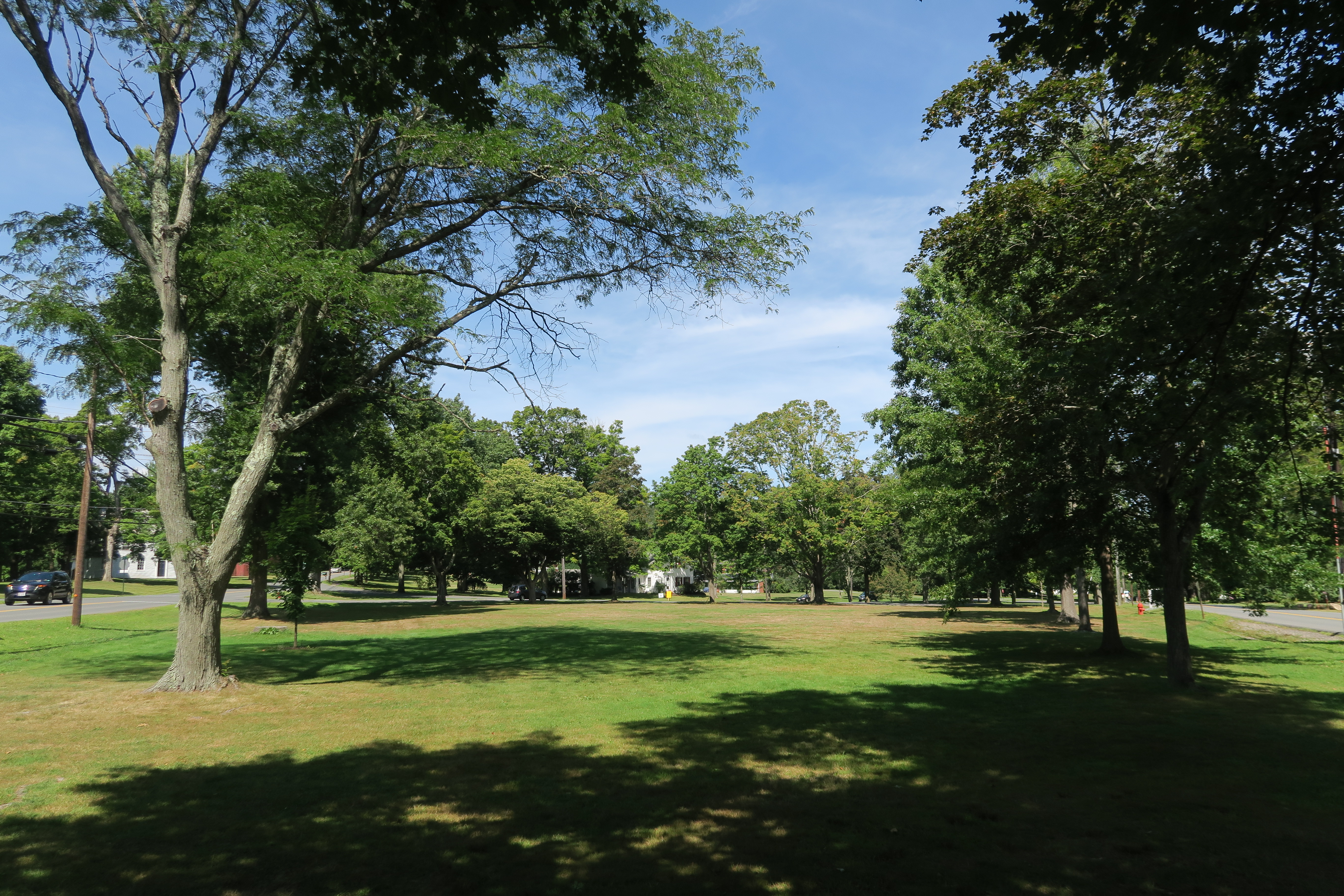
- South Amherst Common

- Location within Massachusetts Location within the United States
- Coordinates: 42°20′23″N 72°31′21″W
- Country: United States
- State: Massachusetts
- County: Hampshire
- Town: Amherst

Area
  - Total: 4.25 sq mi (11.00 km^{2})
  - Land: 4.22 sq mi (10.94 km^{2})
  - Water: 0.023 sq mi (0.06 km^{2})
- Elevation: 230 ft (70 m)

Population (2010)
  - Total: 4,994
  - Density: 1,182/sq mi (456.5/km^{2})
- Time zone: UTC-5 (Eastern (EST))
  - Summer (DST): UTC-4 (EDT)
- ZIP code: 01002
- Area code: 413
- FIPS code: 25-62675
- GNIS feature ID: 0609086

South Amherst is a census-designated place (CDP) in the town of Amherst in Hampshire County, Massachusetts, United States. The population was 4,994 at the 2010 census. The CDP includes the village of South Amherst and residential subdivisions south of the Amherst town center.

South Amherst is part of the Springfield, Massachusetts Metropolitan Statistical Area.

== Geography ==
South Amherst is located in the southwest part of the town of Amherst. It is bordered to the north by Amherst Center and to the west by the Hadley town line. The CDP extends south to Bay Road.

According to the United States Census Bureau, the CDP has a total area of 4.2 square miles (11.0 km^{2}), of which 0.02 square miles (0.06 km^{2}), or 0.58%, are water.

The original village of South Amherst is near the eastern edge of the CDP, at the junction of Shays Street, South East Street, and Station Road. The village has a town common area between South East and Middle streets, known as the South Amherst Common or Fiddlers Green, which, together with several of the surrounding houses, constitutes the South Amherst Common Historic District.

== Demographics ==
At the 2000 census, there were 5,039 people, 1,500 households and 870 families residing in the CDP. The population density was 458.9/km^{2} (1,187.2/mi^{2}). There were 1,530 housing units at an average density of 139.3/km^{2} (360.5/mi^{2}). The racial makeup of the CDP was 71.66% White, 7.01% African American, 0.22% Native American, 10.82% Asian, 0.12% Pacific Islander, 5.40% from other races, and 4.78% from two or more races. Hispanic or Latino were 9.82% of the population.

There were 1,500 households, of which 34.5% had children under the age of 18 living with them, 37.5% were married couples living together, 17.0% had a female householder with no husband present, and 42.0% were non-families. 18.3% of all households were made up of individuals, and 4.3% had someone living alone who was 65 years of age or older. The average household size was 2.68 and the average family size was 3.12.

19.8% of the population were under the age of 18, 37.4% from 18 to 24, 21.6% from 25 to 44, 15.4% from 45 to 64, and 5.7% who were 65 years of age or older. The median age was 23 years. For every 100 females, there were 90.8 males. For every 100 females age 18 and over, there were 88.1 males.

The median household income was $44,628 and the median family income was $58,438. Males had a median income of $43,793 compared with $35,288 for females. The per capita income for the CDP was $17,191. About 8.3% of families and 17.4% of the population were below the poverty line, including 3.1% of those under age 18 and none of those age 65 or over.
