= North Amherst, Massachusetts =

North Amherst
- Census-designated place
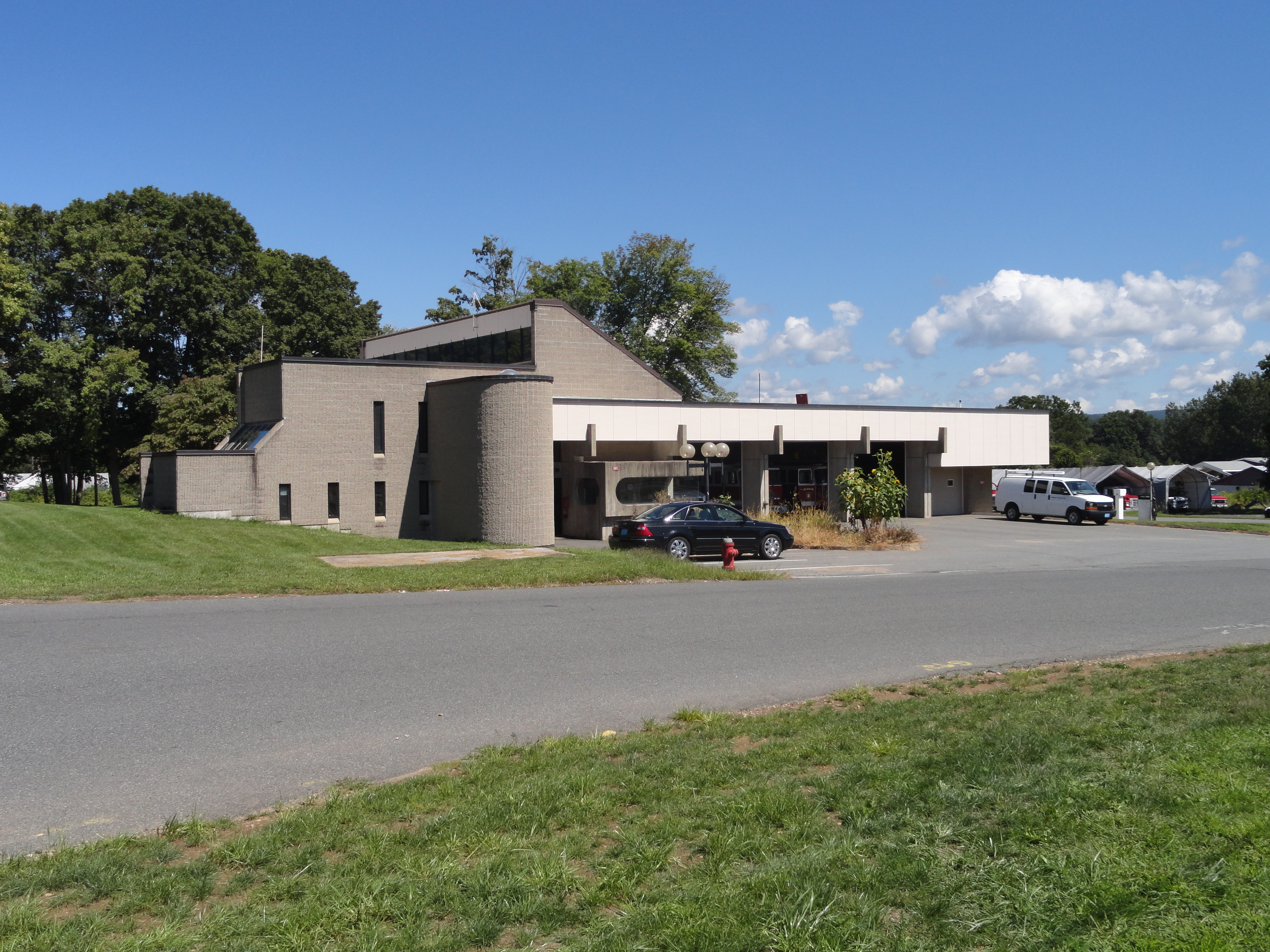
- North Amherst Fire Station

- Location within Massachusetts Location within the United States
- Coordinates: 42°24′22″N 72°31′16″W
- Country: United States
- State: Massachusetts
- County: Hampshire
- Town: Amherst

Area
  - Total: 2.1 sq mi (5.5 km^{2})
  - Land: 2.1 sq mi (5.5 km^{2})
  - Water: 0 sq mi (0.0 km^{2})
- Elevation: 187 ft (57 m)

Population (2010)
  - Total: 6,819
  - Density: 3,202/sq mi (1,236.4/km^{2})
- Time zone: UTC-5 (Eastern (EST))
  - Summer (DST): UTC-4 (EDT)
- ZIP code: 01059
- Area code: 413
- FIPS code: 25-46295
- GNIS feature ID: 0608905

North Amherst is a census-designated place (CDP) in the city of Amherst in Hampshire County, Massachusetts, United States. The population was 6,819 at the 2010 census, up from 6,019 at the 2000 census. It is part of the Springfield, Massachusetts Metropolitan Statistical Area.

North Amherst is located in the northern part of the city of Amherst at 42°24′22″N 72°31′16″W (42.406192, -72.521217). It is bordered to the south by the Amherst Center CDP and to the southwest by the town of Hadley. The CDP border follows the Mill River north from the Hadley town line, then east across Massachusetts Route 116 as far as Massachusetts Route 63. The border then follows Pulpit Hill Road, Mill Street, Sand Hill Road, and Pine Street east to the New England Central Railroad line, which it follows south to Tilson Farm Road. The CDP boundary then proceeds west along Tilson Farm Road and Eastman Lane to North Pleasant Street, which it follows north to a brook near the Hadley town line.

According to the United States Census Bureau, the CDP has a total area of 2.1 square miles (5.5 km^{2}), of which 1.0 acre (3,930 m^{2}), or 0.07%, are water.

There are several large apartment complexes in North Amherst, housing mostly students of the University of Massachusetts Amherst along with low-income families (a plurality of whom are graduate students). Apart from these housing developments, North Amherst also sports a number of older houses, and North Amherst Center Historic District is on the National Register of Historic Places.

North Amherst is home to a large majority of Amherst middle income families, as the main street (North Pleasant Street) has multiple housing developments built off it. This includes "Grantwood", which is the largest neighborhood/development in Amherst. North Amherst is also home to two cohousing communities: Pioneer Valley and Pine Street Cohousing.

Cushman Village is located just east of North Amherst. This small area is unique, as the roads turn back into each other unlike the square roads off East Pleasant Street. Cushman Village has a number of historical homes, as well as the Cushman Common and the Cushman Store.

North Amhearst is also known for its amphibian tunnels. The Henry Street salamander tunnels are tunnels which run under Henry Street in North Amherst. The tunnels help spotted salamanders cross Henry Street to get to vernal pools that the salamanders use for breeding. They are the first amphibian tunnels in the United States.

== Demographics ==
As of the census of 2000, there were 6,019 people, 1,915 households, and 813 families residing in the CDP. The population density was 1,101.4/km^{2} (2,856.1/mi^{2}). There were 1,947 housing units at an average density of 356.3/km^{2} (923.9/mi^{2}). The racial makeup of the CDP was 75.76% White, 4.44% African American, 0.25% Native American, 13.09% Asian, 0.22% Pacific Islander, 3.11% from other races, and 3.14% from two or more races. Hispanic or Latino of any race were 6.43% of the population.

There were 1,915 households, out of which 25.4% had children under the age of 18 living with them, 30.9% were married couples living together, 9.3% had a female householder with no husband present, and 57.5% were non-families. 22.3% of all households were made up of individuals, and 4.5% had someone living alone who was 65 years of age or older. The average household size was 2.60 and the average family size was 2.99.

In the CDP, the population was spread out, with 14.2% under the age of 18, 50.4% from 18 to 24, 19.7% from 25 to 44, 10.8% from 45 to 64, and 4.9% who were 65 years of age or older. The median age was 22 years. For every 100 females, there were 105.6 males. For every 100 females age 18 and over, there were 103.3 males.

The median income for a household in the CDP was $28,063, and the median income for a family was $43,423. Males had a median income of $37,202 versus $29,079 for females. The per capita income for the CDP was $14,336. About 12.8% of families and 33.6% of the population were below the poverty line, including 19.5% of those under age 18 and 2.2% of those age 65 or over.
