= Samuel Weed Barnum =

American minister and author

- Born: June 4, 1820; North Salem, New York, U.S.
- Died: November 18, 1891 (age 71); New Haven, Connecticut, U.S.
- Occupations: Minister, author, lexicographer
- Children: 4, including Charlotte Barnum

Samuel Weed Barnum (June 4, 1820 – November 18, 1891) was an American minister and author.

== Early life and education ==
Barnum, the only son of Horace and Cynthia (Weed) Barnum, was born in North Salem, Westchester County, New York, on June 4, 1820, and removed to Stamford, Connecticut, in 1835.

Barnum graduated from Yale College in 1841. He studied in the Yale Divinity School from 1841 to 1844, but during his theological course, and afterwards, he suffered much from ill-health.

== Career ==
From March, 1845, to August, 1847, Barnum was the principal assistant of Professor Goodrich in the revision of Webster's Dictionary. From December, 1848, to April, 1850, he preached to the First Congregational Church in Granby, Connecticut. In 1851 and 1852 he preached for fourteen months at Feeding Hills, then a parish of West Springfield, now of Agawam, Massachusetts. He was ordained pastor of the Congregational Church in Chesterfield, Mass., on January 25, 1853, and remained there for two years. From January 1, 1856, to May 14, 1862, he was pastor of the church in Phillipston, Mass. He remained for one year longer in Phillipston, and then resided for two years in Stamford.

In May, 1865, he removed to New Haven, and during his residence here, besides preaching as health and opportunity permitted, he prepared for the press a Comprehensive Dictionary of the Bible (1868), mainly abridged from Dr. William Smith; Romanism as it is (1871); and a Vocabulary of English Rhymes (1876). His health, never robust, was after this date more precarious; but he was able to take charge, in part, of the department of pronunciation in the new Webster's International Dictionary (1890), and was preparing an elaborate Fifty-years' Record of his Yale class, at the time of his death.

== Publications ==
- Romanism as It Is (1871)
- Vocabulary of English Rhymes (1876)
- Comprehensive Dictionary of the Bible (1878)

== Personal life ==
Barnum married, on April 16, 1849, Charlotte Betts, of Stamford, who survived him with their children, two sons and two daughters; the sons were graduates of Yale College, in 1875 and 1879, respectively, one daughter was mathematician Charlotte Barnum. Barnum died from heart-disease, in New Haven, on November 18, 1891, in his 72nd year.
