= G. Adolph Johnson =

American architect (1889–1985)

Gustaf Adolph Johnson
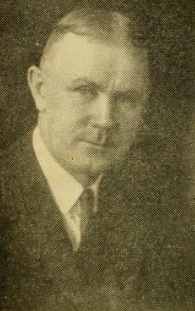
- Johnson c. 1927
- Born: September 9, 1889; Worcester, Massachusetts, U.S.
- Died: June 27, 1985 (aged 95); Westborough, Massachusetts, U.S.
- Occupation: Architect

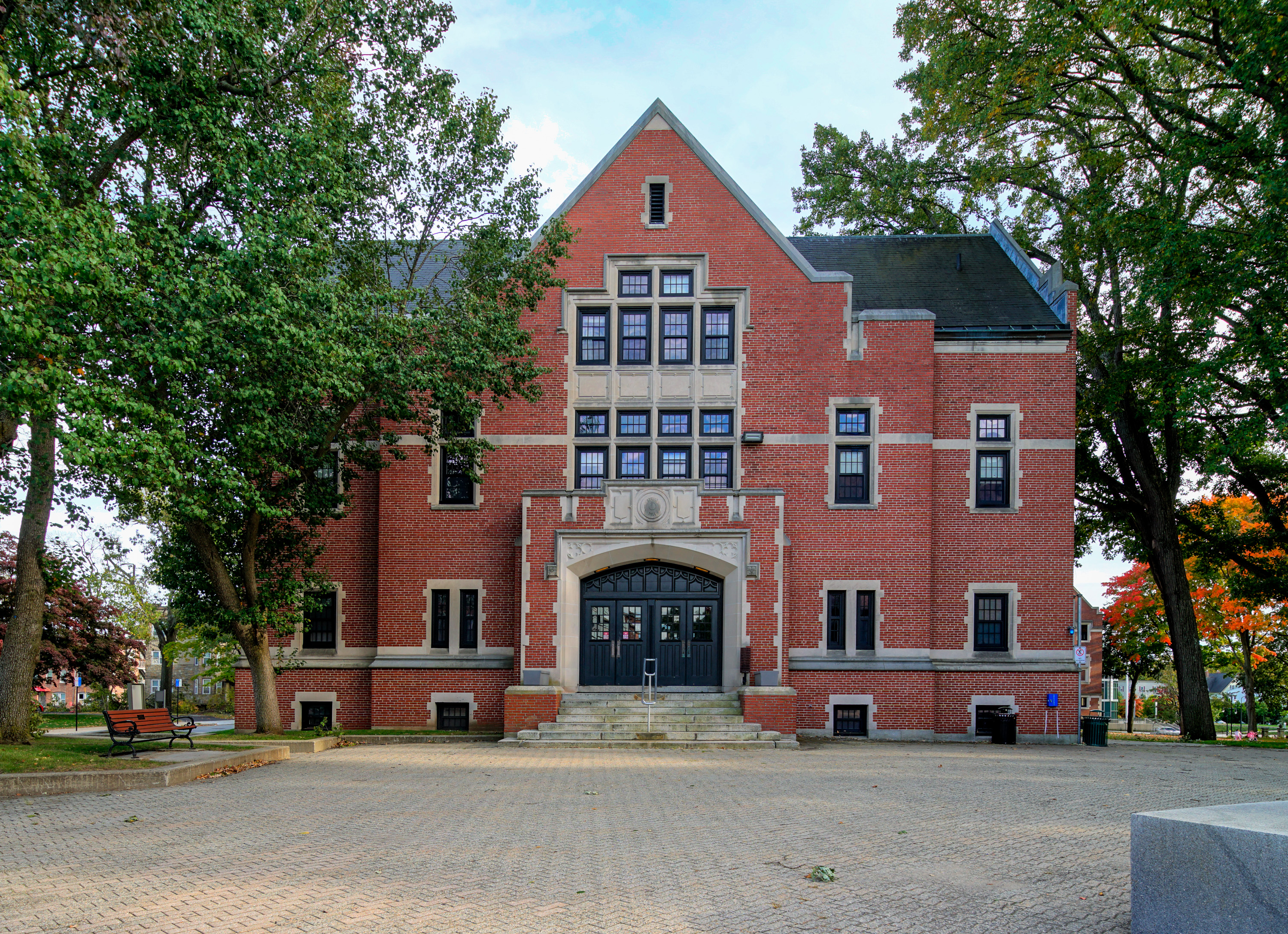
Atwood Hall at Clark University in Worcester, designed by Johnson and built in 1937–38.

Gustaf Adolph Johnson (1889-1985) was an American architect and politician from Worcester, Massachusetts.

== Life and career ==
Gustaf Adolph Johnson was born September 9, 1889, in Worcester to John A. Johnson and Christina (Fors) Johnson, both of whom had immigrated from Sweden in 1884. He attended public schools, graduating from the English High School in 1907. He then went to study in the Washington-based atelier of Glenn Brown, an MIT-trained architect. When he returned to Worcester, he took a job with the architect George H. Clemence. After a brief period, he accepted a position in the Worcester Boys' Trade High School, where he was an instructor in drawing. When the United States entered World War I in 1917, Johnson served in the governmental service department for the rehabilitation of disabled soldiers. This eventually took him to Chicago, where he attended classes in architecture at the Armour Institute. In Chicago he worked for Patton, Holmes & Flinn, where he worked on buildings for Carleton College in Minnesota.

When Johnson returned to Worcester in 1922, he opened his own office and began to practice as an architect. For forty years he was associated with fellow architect Jasper Rustigian. (Note: Jasper Rustigian (1882-1965) was born in Harpoot, now part of Turkey. An Armenian, his family immigrated to Worcester in 1891. He received his architectural training with Fuller & Delano and established his practice in about 1919. Among Rustigian's independent designs is the Duprey Building in Worcester, completed in 1926, where Johnson and Rustigian kept their office until the late 1930s. Not to be confused with the Rhode Island lawyer of the same name, born in the same town in 1876.) Though for the most part they shared only their resources, not their projects, for part of the 1940s and 1950s they were in a formal partnership, the firm then being known as Johnson & Rustigian, and briefly as Johnson, Rustigian & Kunz with a third partner. Johnson continued to practice into the 1960s.

Johnson was a member of the Worcester chapter of the American Institute of Architects, but was not a member of the national organization.

== Political and personal life ==
Johnson was a Republican. He was a member of the Worcester City Council from 1924 to 1926, and a member of the Massachusetts House of Representatives from the 17th Worcester district in 1927–28. In addition to his professional affiliations, Johnson was also a member of a number of social and fraternal organizations. He was a director of the Skandia Bank and Trust Company of Worcester and a trustee of Fairlawn Hospital.

Johnson married in 1914, to Signe C. Thorn of Worcester. They had no children. He died June 27, 1985, in Westborough.

== Architectural works ==
- Calvary Lutheran Church, (Note: The building material from this church was reused to build Immanuel Lutheran Church in Holden, completed in 1949.) Salisbury and Wachusett Sts, Worcester, Massachusetts (1925, demolished 1948)
- North Worcester Aid Society addition, 58 Holden St, Worcester, Massachusetts (1928, NRHP 1980)
- Worcester Public Library Billings Branch (former), 15 Hamilton St, Worcester, Massachusetts (1929)
- Providence Street Junior High School (former), 211 Providence St, Worcester, Massachusetts (1930–31)
- Alumni Gymnasium and Atwood Hall, Clark University, Worcester, Massachusetts (1937–38)
- First Unitarian Church, (Note: The original church was built in 1850 to a design by Sidney Mason Stone. This was almost completely destroyed in the 1938 New England hurricane. Johnson rebuilt the church to the original design, using salvaged materials where possible.) 90 Main St, Worcester, Massachusetts (1939)
- Worcester Art Museum addition, (Note: Alterations and the addition of a fourth floor to the central building, originally used for the display of modern art.) 55 Salisbury St, Worcester, Massachusetts (1939–40)
- Immanuel Lutheran Church, 346 Shrewsbury St, Holden, Massachusetts (1948–49)
- Phillipston Memorial School, 20 The Common, Phillipston, Massachusetts (1948)
- Chandler Street Junior High School, (Note: Designed in association with The Architects Collaborative of Cambridge.) 525 Chandler St, Worcester, Massachusetts (1950)
- Burncoat Junior High School, 135 Burncoat St, Worcester, Massachusetts (1951)
- Fairlawn Hospital addition, 189 May St, Worcester, Massachusetts (1951)
- All Saints Episcopal Church Education Building, 10 Irving St, Worcester, Massachusetts (1954)
- St. Francis Episcopal Church, 70 Highland St, Holden, Massachusetts (1955)
- Bullock and Wright Residence Halls, Jefferson Hall and Jeppson Laboratory, (Note: Designed in association with Cram & Ferguson of Boston. Jefferson Hall has been demolished.) Clark University, Worcester, Massachusetts (1958–59)
- West Building, (Note: Designed in association with Perkins & Will of Chicago and White Plains.) Memorial Hospital, Worcester, Massachusetts (1961–62)
- Paul R. Swan Library, Becker College, Leicester, Massachusetts (1963)

== Gallery of architectural works ==
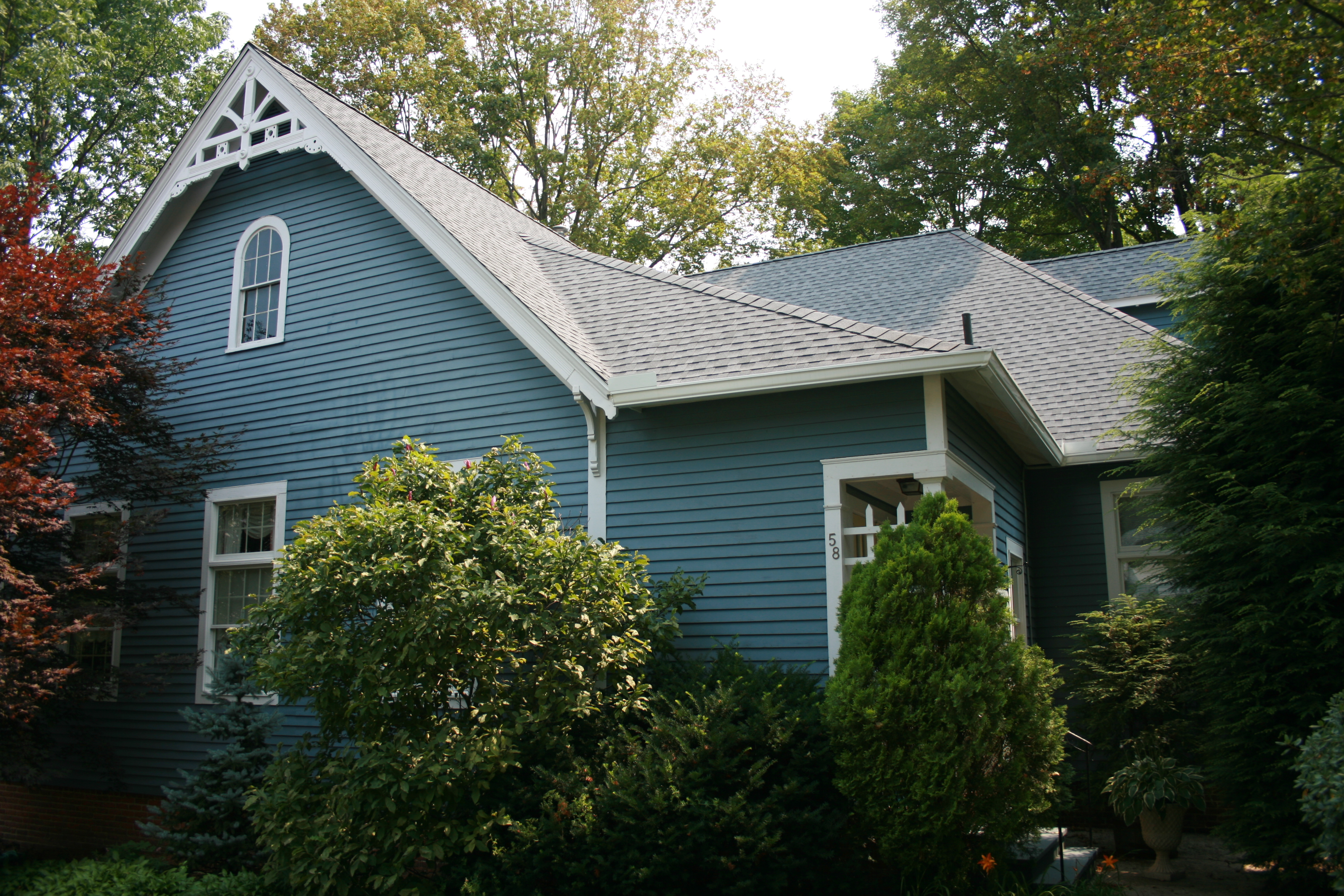
North Worcester Aid Society addition (right), Worcester, Massachusetts, 1928.

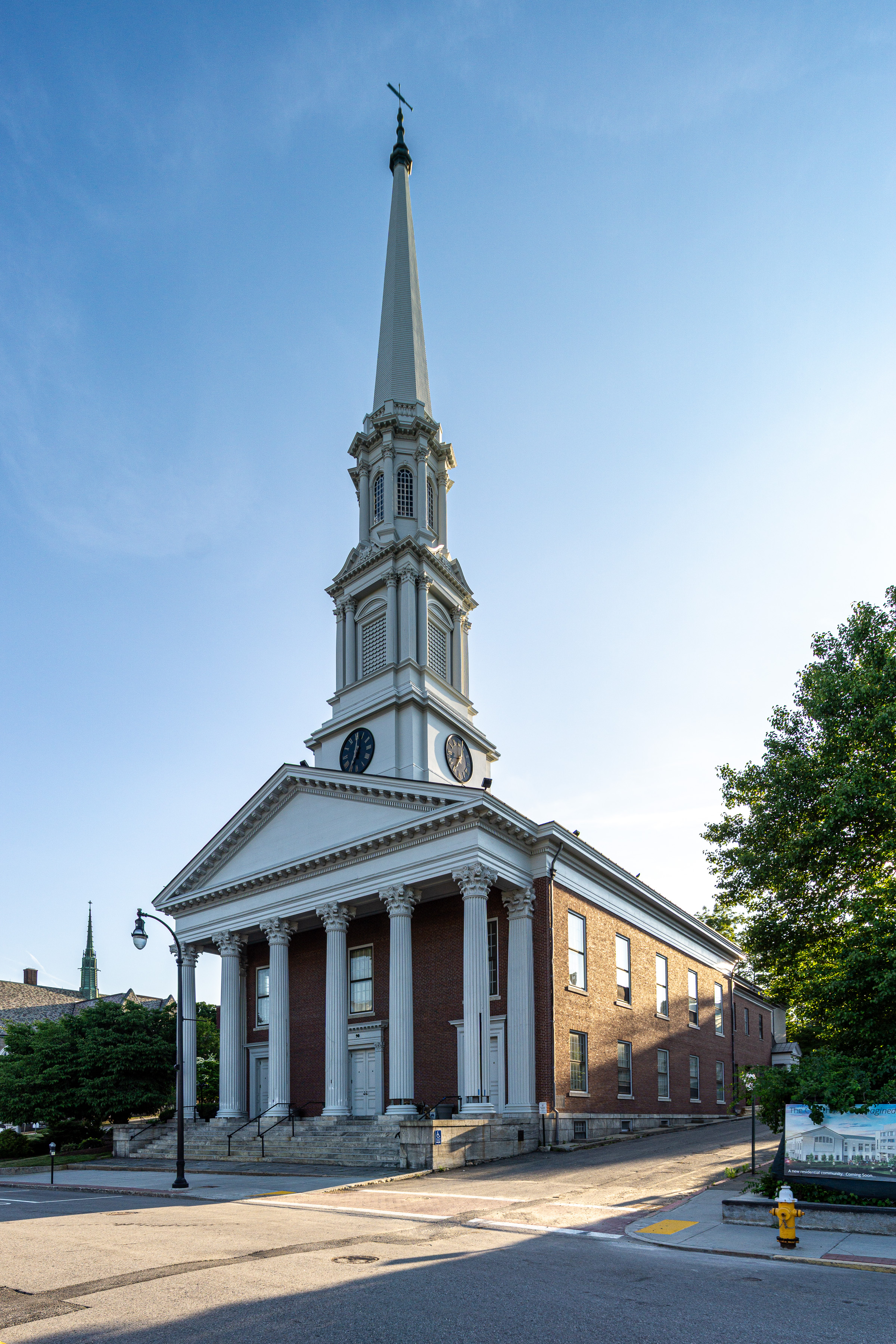
First Unitarian Church, Worcester, Massachusetts, 1939.

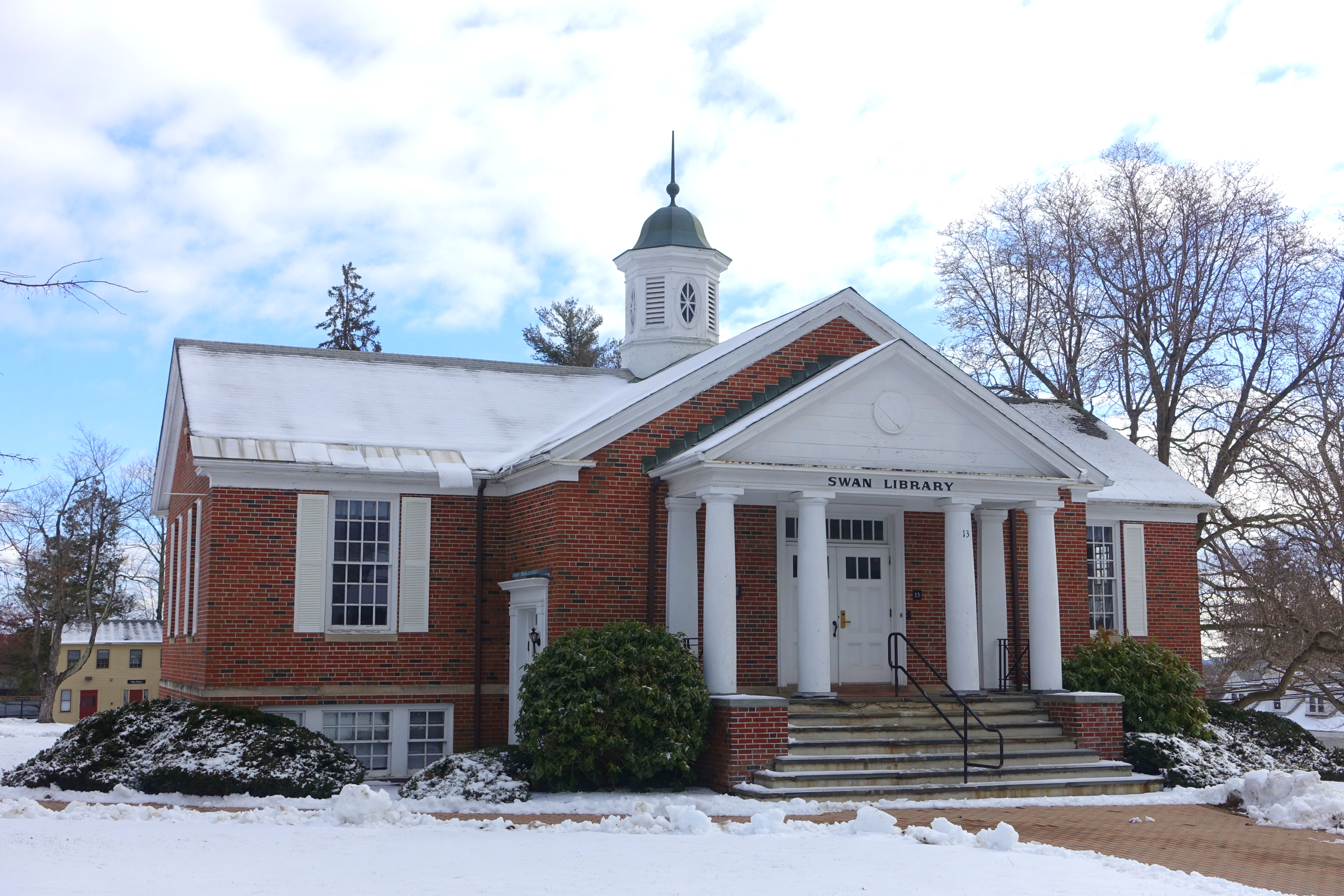
Paul R. Swan Library, Becker College, Leicester, Massachusetts, 1963.
