= Agawam High School =

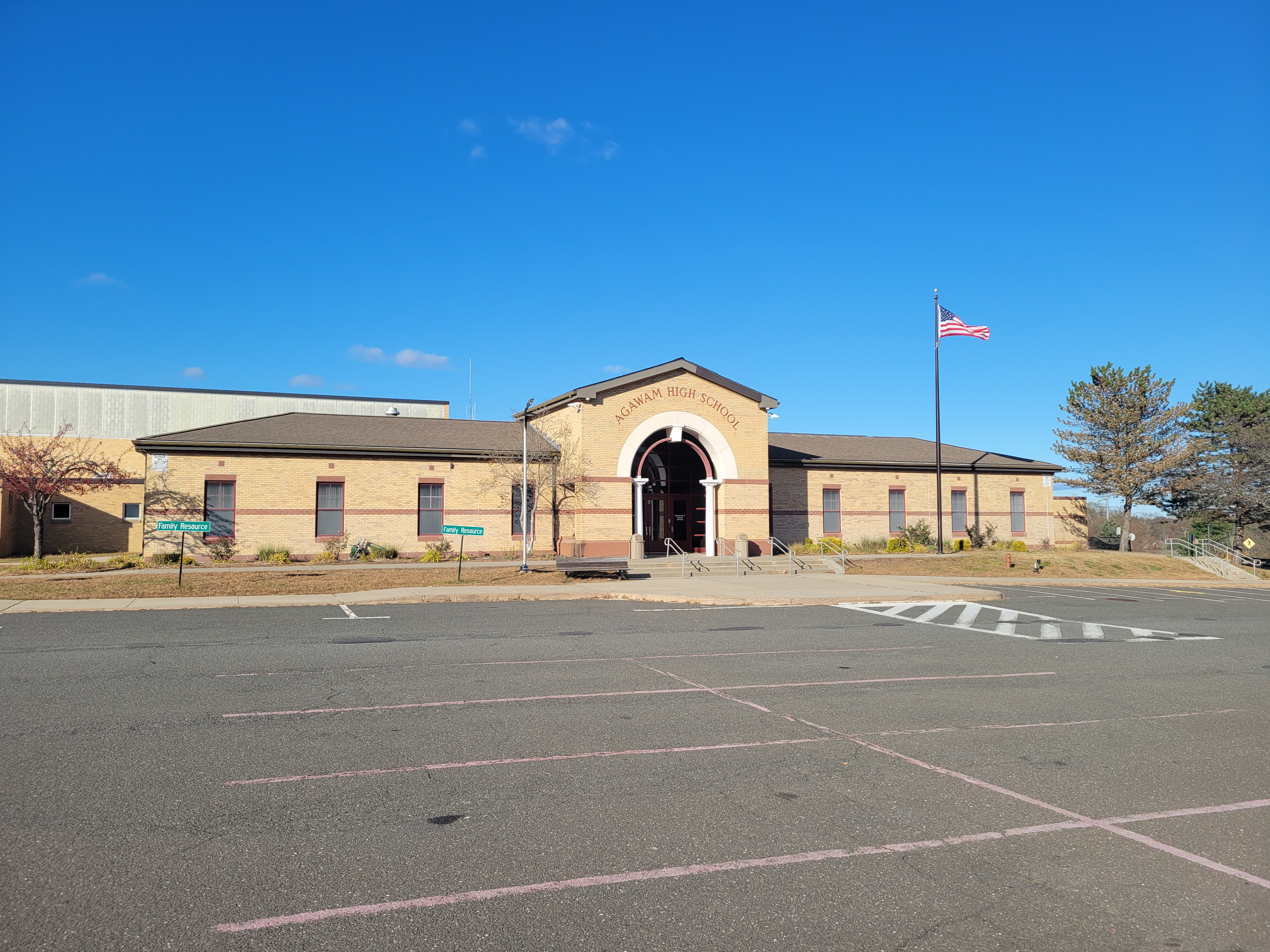
- Agawam High School

Location
- 761 Cooper Street; Agawam, Massachusetts 01001; United States; 42°4′27″N 72°38′42″W

Information
- Type: Public high school
- Principal: Jim Blain
- Teaching staff: 95.09 (on an FTE basis)
- Grades: 9-12
- Enrollment: 1,052 (2022-23)
- Student to teacher ratio: 11.06
- Colors: Brown and orange
- Team name: Brownies
- Rival: West Springfield High School
- Website: www.agawamed.org/o/ahs

Agawam High School is a public high school in Agawam, Massachusetts. In 2018, enrollment was about 1,250. Minority enrollment was 12 percent. U.S. News ranked the school as silver.

The Brownie is the school mascot and the school colors are brown and orange.

In June 2024, residents voted to build a new high school estimated to be valued at $230,000,000.

== Programs ==
The school has a marching band. In 2007 the school instituted the EPICS program.

== Athletics ==
The school competes in the Pioneer Valley Interscholastic Athletic Conference. The school's cross country team trains in Robinson State Park.

Jim "Turk" Bruno set the Western Massachusetts scoring record in football during the 1956 season with 174 points. The team won its first AA Conference championship in 1957 and 3 more in the 1960s.

== Alumni ==
- Phil McGeoghan, coach and former professional football player
- Carl Beane, radio broadcaster
- Tom Wlaschiha, actor

== See also ==
- List of secondary school sports team names and mascots derived from indigenous peoples
