= Sue C. Nichols =

American artist (1965–2020)

- Nichols, c. 2016
- Born: Susan Carol Nichols; June 10, 1965; East Longmeadow, Massachusetts, U.S.
- Died: September 1, 2020 (aged 55); East Longmeadow, Massachusetts, U.S.
- Resting place: Massachusetts Veterans Memorial Cemetery, Agawam, Massachusetts, U.S.
- Occupation: Artist
- Years active: 1986–2019
- Spouse: Chester "JR" Maciorowski
- Children: 2

Susan Carol Maciorowski (née Nichols; June 10, 1965 – September 1, 2020) was an American artist best known for her work with Walt Disney Animation Studios predominantly during the Disney Renaissance and Post-Renaissance.

== Early life and education ==
Susan Carol Nichols was born to parents Brian and Julie. She graduated from East Longmeadow High School in 1983 before going on to study visual animation at the California Institute of the Arts where she later lectured, graduating in 1987.

== Personal life ==
She married Chester "JR" Maciorowski and had two children, Stephanie and Jonathan.

== Death ==
In 2015, she was diagnosed with metastatic breast cancer. She received treatment at D'Amour Center for Cancer Care in Springfield, Massachusetts. She died on September 1, 2020, and was buried in Massachusetts Veterans Memorial Cemetery in Agawam, Massachusetts.

Disney released a statement announcing her death in the same month with a long thread celebrating her work. Eric Goldberg said, "She will be sadly missed by those of us who had the good fortune to work with her, but her influence on those films will be there forever." On the first anniversary of her death, her husband published one final entry on her personal website on a page she used to document her life living with cancer, detailing what happened between her last post on the page on January 16, 2020, and her death.

== Filmography ==
=== Film ===
Year	Title	Credits	Notes
1991	Beauty and the Beast	Visual development artist	
1992	Aladdin	Story	
1994	The Lion King	Character designer, visual development artist	
1994	The Pagemaster	Storyboard artist	
1996	The Hunchback of Notre Dame	Story, character designer, visual development	
1997	Hercules	Production stylist	
1998	Mulan	Character designer, visual development	
1999	Fantasia 2000	Storyboard artist	
2000	The Emperor's New Groove	Additional visual development artist	
2001	Atlantis: The Lost Empire	Additional visual development artist	
2002	Lilo & Stitch	Visual development supervisor	
2003	Piglet's Big Movie	Storyboard artist	
2004	Mulan II	Additional storyboard artist	Direct-to-video
2006	Bambi and the Great Prince of the Forest	Additional storyboard artist	Direct-to-video
2007	Enchanted	Visual development	
2009	The Princess and the Frog	Visual development artist, color and design artist	
2016	Moana	Character design	
2019	UglyDolls	Storyboard artist	

=== Television ===
Year	Title	Credits	Notes
1986-1989	Muppet Babies	Model designer	58 episodes
1986	My Little Pony 'n Friends	Designer	Special
1989	McGee and Me!	Character modeler	5 episodes
1989	Blondie & Dagwood: Second Wedding Workout	Modeler	Television film

== Awards and nominations ==
Year	Award	Category	Work	Result	Ref.
1993	Hugo Awards	Best Dramatic Presentation	Aladdin	Nominated	
2020	Winsor McCay Award			Won	
