= Searles Hill Cemetery =

Historic cemetery in Massachusetts, United States

- U.S. National Register of Historic Places
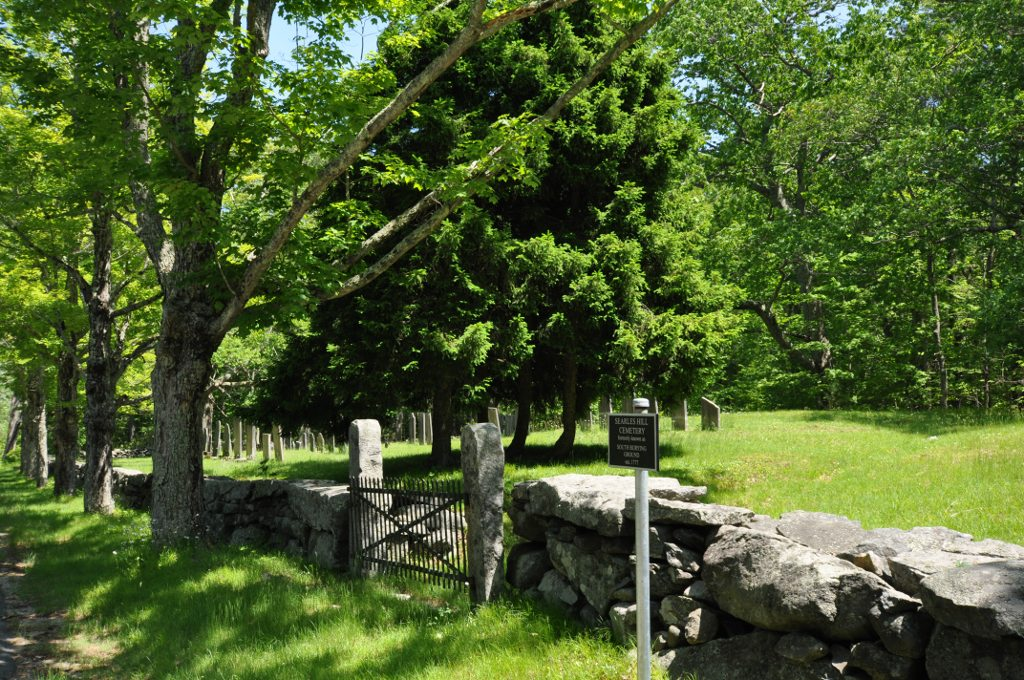

- Location within Massachusetts Location within the United States
- Location: Searles Hill Rd., Phillipston, Massachusetts
- Coordinates: 42°31′54″N 72°07′35″W
- Area: 3.3 acres (1.3 ha)
- Built: 1777
- NRHP reference No.: 11000665
- Added to NRHP: September 15, 2011

The Searles Hill Cemetery is a historic cemetery near the junction of Searles Hill Road and Old Queen Lake Road in Phillipston, Massachusetts. Established in 1777 on land donated by an early settler for the purpose in 1759, it is the town's oldest cemetery. It was listed on the National Register of Historic Places on September 15, 2011.

== Description and history ==
The Searles Hill Cemetery is located in rural southern Phillipston, on 3.3 acres (1.3 ha) on the east side of Searles Hill Road north of its junction with Old Queen Lake Road; the latter is historically part of a major east-west route through the area. The cemeter is roughly rectangular in shape, with 330 feet (100 m) of road frontage lined by a stone wall of cut granite about 4 feet (1.2 m) high. The wall is set off from the road by a row of mature maple trees, and has a single entry gate flanked by granite posts. Fieldstone walls line the other three sides of the property. There is no formal circulation pattern within the cemetery grounds, with most markers arrayed generally in lines, grouped by family. There is one family plot, that of the Stratton family, that is set off by a steel rail fence with granite posts. Most of the cemetery's 98 markers are made of slate or marble; the oldest dated marker is from 1777.

Phillipston was originally part of Templeton, which was settled about 1750 and incorporated in 1762. Phillipston was separated from Templeton in 1786 as the town of Gerry, and was renamed Phillipston in 1814. The land for this cemetery was donated to the community in 1759 by Charles Baker, one of the first settlers in the area. It is the burial site of other early settlers, including members of the White family, and of at least four documented American Revolutionary War veterans.

== See also ==
- National Register of Historic Places listings in Worcester County, Massachusetts
