= Phillipston Center Historic District =

Historic district in Massachusetts, United States

- U.S. National Register of Historic Places
- U.S. Historic district
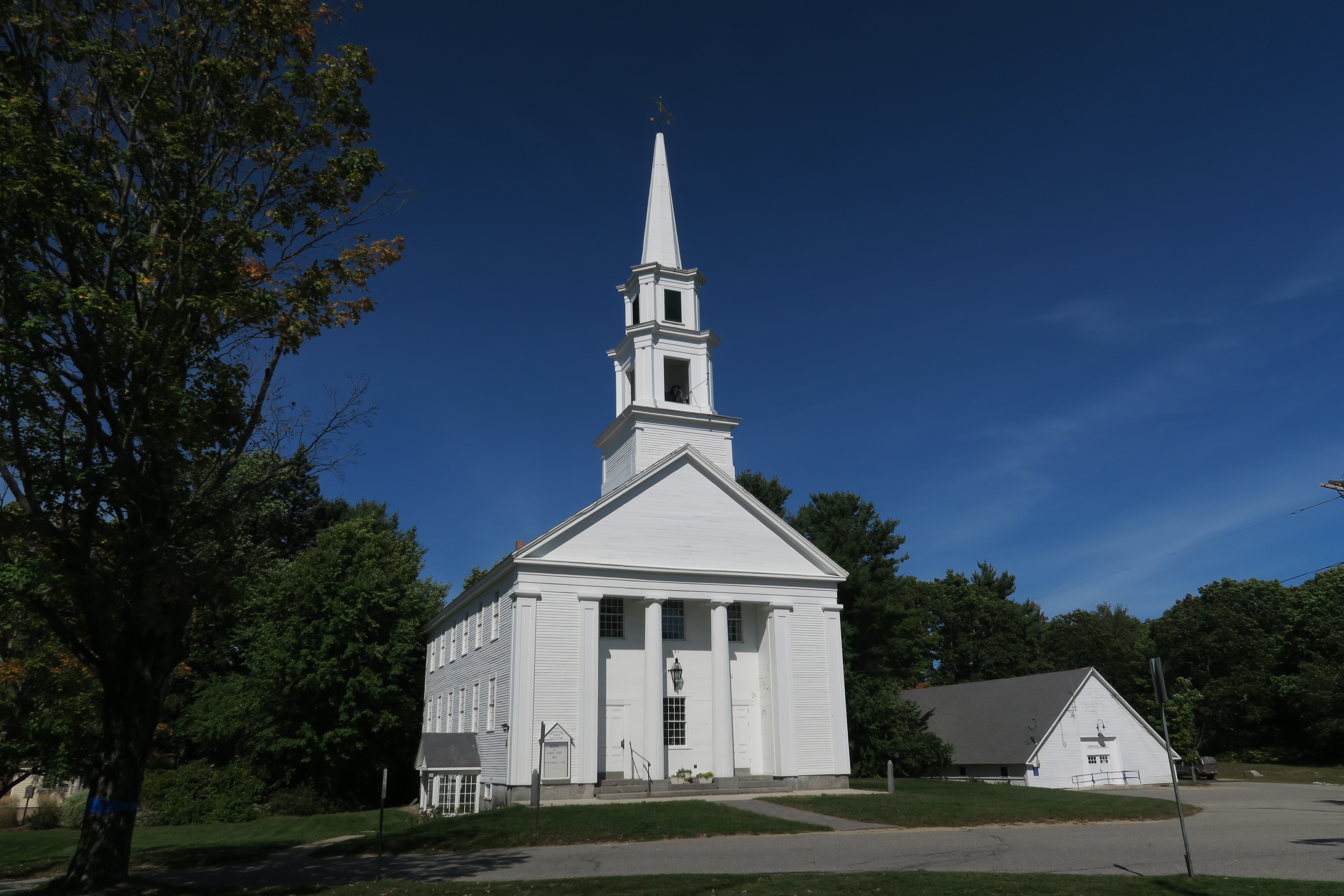
- Congregational Meeting House

- Location within Massachusetts Location within the United States
- Location: Roughly along The Common, Baldwinville, Petersham and Templeton Rds., Phillipston, Massachusetts
- Coordinates: 42°33′3″N 72°8′13″W
- Area: 44 acres (18 ha)
- Built: 1784
- Architectural style: Federal, Greek Revival
- NRHP reference No.: 99001385
- Added to NRHP: November 22, 1999

Phillipston Center Historic District encompasses the historic village center of Phillipston, Massachusetts. The town was first settled in 1751 on land grants made in the 1730s, and was incorporated as a separate town in the 1770s. The surviving village center not far from the location of the first settlement, eventually came to include a tavern. After incorporation, the center developed around what is now the junction of the Baldwinville, Petersham, and Templeton Roads, although this took time, possibly because of difficulties associated with the American Revolutionary War. As a result, the district has relatively few properties that date to the 18th century. All of these are modest vernacular residential structures. The town grew only modestly until 1830, after which time its population declined, not reaching the same level until 1980, 150 years later. As a result of the lack of growth, most of the properties in the district are Federal and Greek Revival in character. Many of the institutional buildings in the center date to the late 19th and early 20th centuries. The district was added to the National Register of Historic Places in 1999.

The town common is an irregularly shaped trapezoid, which is mostly grassy, with lines of mature trees at its fringes. There are no buildings on the common itself, with residential and civic buildings lining the roadways that define its boundaries. It is anchored on the north by the Congregational Church, built in 1786 and altered and given Greek Revival styling in 1837, and the south by the town hall, built in 1891 with Victorian Gothic styling. Just east of the church is the town library, formerly a district school; built in the 1830s, it is distinctive for its four-column Greek Revival temple front.

== See also ==
- National Register of Historic Places listings in Worcester County, Massachusetts
