= Elliott Laurel =

Open space preserve in Massachusetts, US

Coordinates: 42.529°N 72.123°W

Eliott Laurel
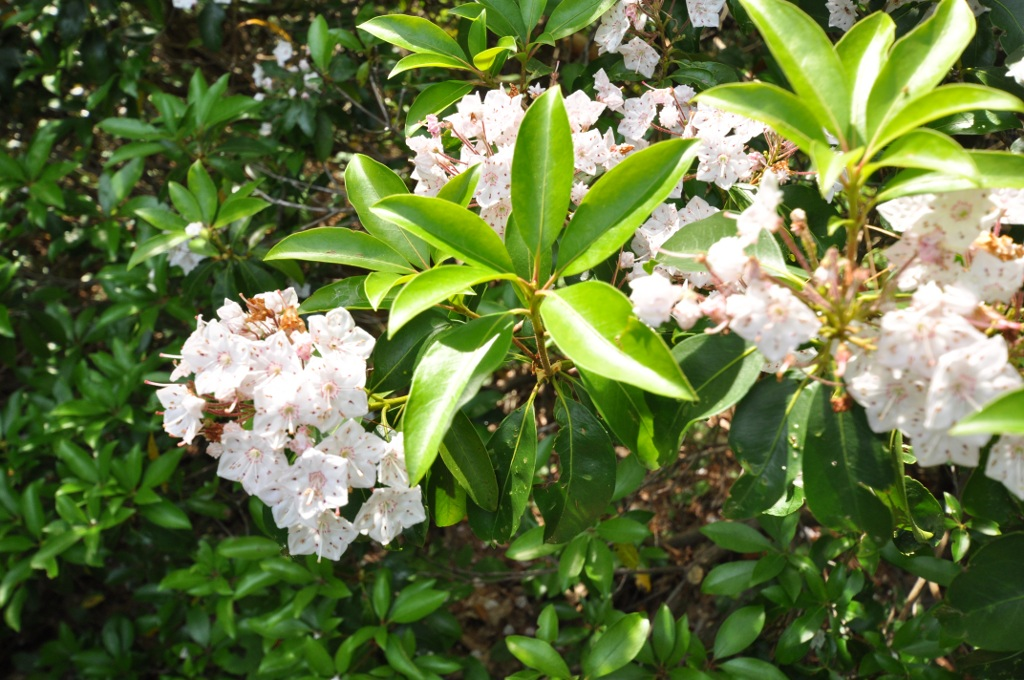
- Mountain laurel in bloom at Elliott Preserve, June 2013
- Interactive map of Eliott Laurel
- Established: 1941
- Operator: The Trustees of Reservations
- Website: Elliott Laurel

Elliott Laurel is a 33-acre (13 ha) open space preserve located in Phillipston, Massachusetts. The property, notable for its extensive stands of mountain laurel, is managed by the land conservation non-profit organization The Trustees of Reservations. Elliott Laurel also contains woodlands, ledges, boulders, and a hayfield.

== History and recreation ==
The reserve is named for Frederick W. Elliott, who donated the original acreage to the Trustees of Reservations in 1941. Additional property was purchased in 1972.

Elliott Laurel is open to hiking, cross country skiing, and hunting (in season). A 1 mile (1.6 km) network of trails loop through the reservation and ascend to a scenic vista along a series of ledges.
