= Charlotte Barnum =

Mathematician and social activist

- Born: May 17, 1860; Phillipston, Massachusetts
- Died: March 27, 1934 (aged 73); Middletown, Connecticut
- Education: Vassar College; Yale University
- Scientific career
- Workplaces: Carleton College; U.S. Naval Observatory; U.S. Coast and Geodetic Survey; U.S. Department of Agriculture as an editor for the Biological Survey
- Thesis: Functions Having Lines or Surfaces of Discontinuity (1895)
- Doctoral advisor: Unknown

Charlotte Cynthia Barnum (May 17, 1860 – March 27, 1934), mathematician and social activist, was the first woman to receive a Ph.D. in mathematics from Yale University.

== Early life and education ==
Charlotte Barnum was born in Phillipston, Massachusetts, the third of four children of the Reverend Samuel Weed Barnum (1820–1891) and Charlotte Betts Barnum (1823–1899). Education was important in her family: two uncles had received medical degrees from Yale and her father had graduated from there with a Bachelor of Arts and a Bachelor of Divinity. Her brothers Samuel Horace Barnum (1852–1939) and Thomas Rossiter Barnum (1857–1938) would both graduate from Yale, and her sister Clara Louisa Barnum (1866–1953) would attend Yale graduate school after graduating from Vassar.

After graduating from Hillhouse High School in New Haven, Connecticut Charlotte attended Vassar College, where she graduated in 1881.

From 1881 to 1886, she taught at a boys' preparatory school, Betts Academy, in Stamford, Connecticut and at Hillhouse High School. She also did computing work for the Yale Observatory 1883–1885 and worked on a revision of James Dwight Dana's System of Mineralogy. Charlotte was an editorial writer for Webster's International Dictionary from 1886 to 1890, and then taught astronomy at Smith College for the academic year 1889–90.

In 1890, Charlotte applied for graduate studies at Johns Hopkins University, but was turned down because they did not accept women. She persisted and with the support of Simon Newcomb, professor of mathematics and astronomy at the university, she won approval to attend lectures without enrollment and without charge. Two years later, she moved to New Haven to pursue her graduate studies at Yale. In 1895, she was the first woman to receive a Ph.D. in mathematics from that institution. Her thesis was titled "Functions Having Lines or Surfaces of Discontinuity". The identity of her adviser is unclear from the record.

== Later career ==
After receiving her Ph.D., Charlotte Barnum taught at Carleton College in Northfield, Minnesota for one year. She then left academia, and did civilian and governmental applied mathematics and editorial work the remainder of her career.

In 1898, she joined the American Academy of Actuaries and until 1901 worked as an actuarial computer for the Massachusetts Mutual Life Insurance Company, Springfield, Massachusetts and the Fidelity Mutual Life Insurance Company in Philadelphia, Pennsylvania.

In 1901, she moved to Washington D.C. to work as a computer for US Naval Observatory. She subsequently did the same work for the tidal division of the United States Coast and Geodetic Survey until 1908, and then was editorial assistant in the biological survey section of the US Department of Agriculture through 1913.

She left government employment and returned to New Haven in 1914 where she did editorial work for Yale Peruvian Expeditions, the Yale University secretary's office, and the Yale University Press.

Starting in 1917, she worked in various organizations and academic institutions in Connecticut, New York and Massachusetts as an editor, actuary and teacher. All her life she was involved in social and charitable organizations and activities. In 1934 she died in Middletown, Connecticut of meningitis at the age of seventy-three. Her burial location is at Grove Street Cemetery in New Haven, New Haven County, Connecticut, USA. Grove Street Cemetery is where all her siblings are buried, but not her parents.

== Memberships ==
- One of the first women members of the American Mathematical Society
- Fellow, American Academy of Actuaries (AAAS)
- Fellow, American Association for the Advancement of Science
- Alumnae Member, Vassar College chapter of Phi Beta Kappa
- Women's Joint Legislative Commission (for equal rights)
- National Conference of Charities (now the National Conference on Social Welfare)

== Publications ==
- 1911: "The Girl Who Lives at Home: Two Suggestions to Trade Union Women," (Life and Labor, Volume 1, 1911) p. 346.
