= Massachusetts Veterans Memorial Cemetery at Agawam =

Veterans cemetery in Agawam, Massachusetts, U.S.

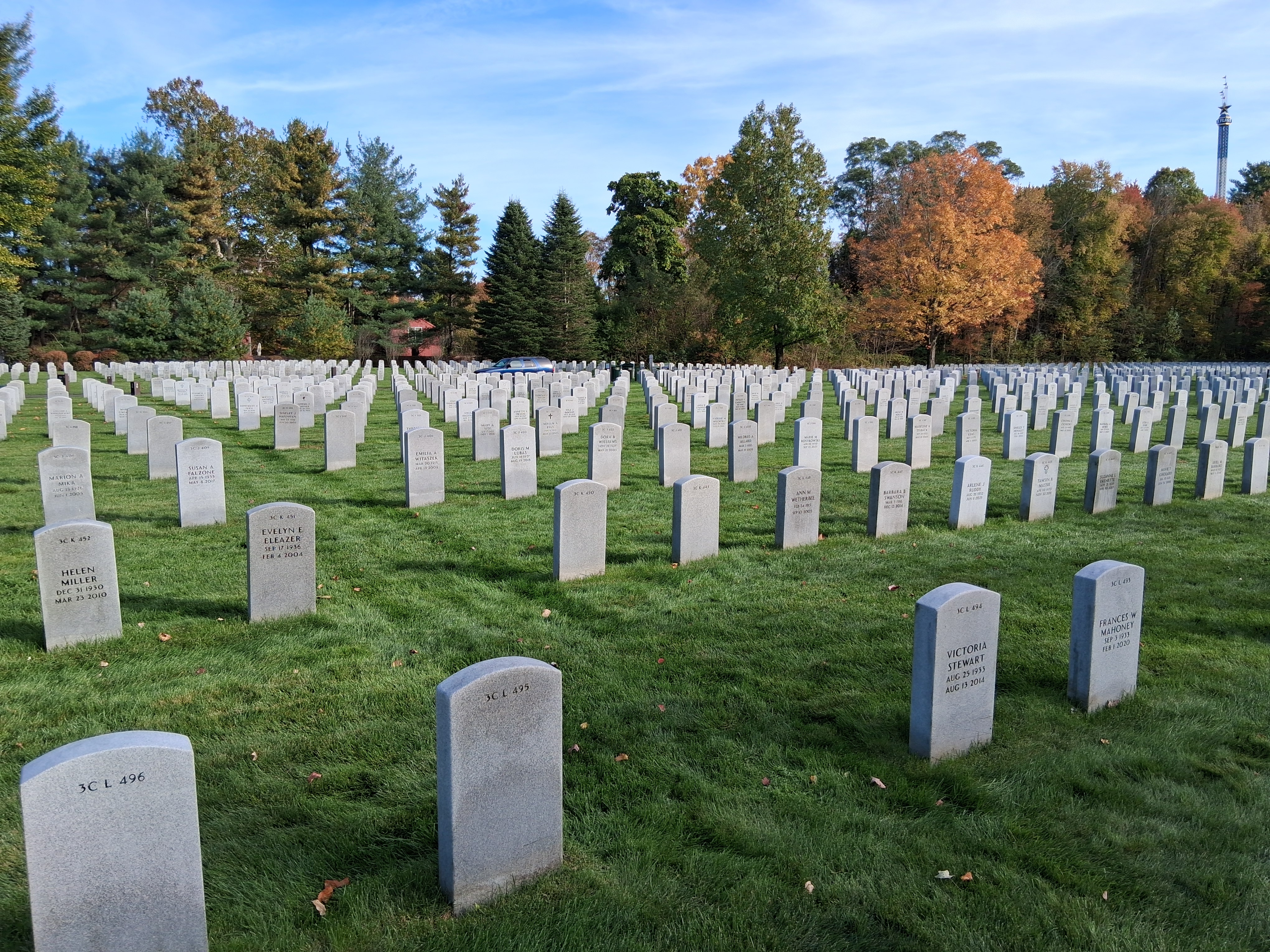
- Section 3C of the cemetery in October 2025
- Interactive map of Massachusetts Veterans Memorial Cemetery at Agawam

Details
- Established: May 21, 2001
- Location: 1390 Main Street; Agawam, Massachusetts, U.S.
- Coordinates: 42°2′46″N 72°37′3″W
- Owned by: Commonwealth of Massachusetts
- Size: 61 acres (25 ha)

The Massachusetts Veterans Memorial Cemetery at Agawam is a veterans cemetery in Agawam, Massachusetts, opened in May 2001.

It is located at 1390 Main Street, next to Six Flags New England, and serves veterans and their spouses from Western Massachusetts.

== History ==
Arrangements by the Massachusetts Department of Veterans' Services to establish the cemetery began in 1996, and a formal groundbreaking ceremony took place on October 8, 1997.

The 61-acre cemetery officially opened on May 21, 2001, with enough space for approximately 50,000 graves. The first veteran buried was Air Force technical sergeant Robert L. LaRue, on May 23.

== Winchendon ==
The Agawam state veterans cemetery is the first of two established in Massachusetts. The other—the Massachusetts Veterans Memorial Cemetery at Winchendon—opened in 2004.

== Notable interments ==
- Sue C. Nichols (1965–2020), artist for Walt Disney Animation Studios
