= Phil McGeoghan =

American football player and coach (born 1979)

Berlin Thunder
- Title: Head coach

Personal information
- Born: July 8, 1979 (age 47); Feeding Hills, Massachusetts, U.S.
- Listed height: 6 ft 2 in (1.88 m)
- Listed weight: 224 lb (102 kg)

Career information
- High school: Agawam (MA)
- College: Maine
- NFL draft: 2001: undrafted

Career history

Playing
- Denver Broncos (2001–2002); Berlin Thunder (2002); New York Jets (2003)*; New Orleans Saints (2003)
- * Offseason or practice squad member only

Coaching
- Maine (2007) Wide receivers coach & tight ends coach; Navy Prep (2008) Offensive coordinator; South Florida (2009–2011) Wide receivers coach; Miami Dolphins (2012–2014) Assistant wide receivers coach; Miami Dolphins (2015) Wide receivers coach; East Carolina (2016) Wide receivers coach; Buffalo Bills (2017) Wide receivers coach; Los Angeles Chargers (2018–2020) Wide receivers coach; Colorado (2022) Wide receivers coach; St. Louis Battlehawks (2024) Wide receivers coach; St. Louis Battlehawks (2025) Offensive coordinator
- Stats at Pro Football Reference

Philip P. McGeoghan (born July 8, 1979) is an American football coach who is currently the Head Coach for the Berlin Thunder of the European League of Football (ELF). He is the former wide receivers coach of the Los Angeles Chargers of the National Football League (NFL). He is a former football player who played four seasons as a wide receiver for the New York Jets, Oakland Raiders, Denver Broncos and New Orleans Saints of the NFL from 2001 to 2004. After injury ended his playing career, McGeoghan became a coach, first at his alma mater, the University of Maine, then as offensive coordinator at the Naval Academy Prep School.

== High school and college career ==
In 1997 McGeoghan graduated from Agawam High School, where he was an All-State football player, All-Western Mass. basketball player, and an All-American in track and field. He excelled at high jump, setting an Agawam High School Record with a leap of 6’ 11’’, and later breaking a university record of 7' 1". McGeoghan was undefeated in high jump for 3 consecutive seasons in Massachusetts. He also broke three Western Mass. records and two state records during his high school track career.

After high school graduation McGeoghan attended Boston University, then transferred to the University of Maine when BU dropped their football program at the end of the 1997 season. There he represented the Maine Black Bears for three seasons from 1998-2000. He earned the 1999 Jack Butterfield Offensive Player of the Year Award, and won the 2000 Woody Carville Senior Achievement Award. McGeoghan continued to compete in track and field at Maine, securing the America East Record in the High Jump and ranking as an All American in Track & Field in 1999 and 2000. He ranked in the top five in two career categories at Maine, including yards (4th; 2,343) and receptions (5th; 151). McGeoghan also performed well in the classroom, being named in several Academic All-America teams and winning the Dean Smith Award. McGeoghan graduated with High Honors in multiple honor societies and received his B.S. in Marketing.

== NFL career ==
After completing his senior football season, McGeoghan signed with the New York Jets as a rookie free agent in spring 2001. He went on to play also for the Denver Broncos, Oakland Raiders, and New Orleans Saints.

== Coaching ==
McGeoghan's career ended early due to a series of injuries, after which he returned to his alma mater, Maine, to coach the tight ends and wide receivers. He was then hired as offensive coordinator for The Naval Academy Prep School by the head coach of The Naval Academy and fellow Polynesian-American Ken Niumatalolo.

In 2009, he became wide receiver coach for the University of South Florida. On February 1, 2012, he became assistant wide receivers coach for the Miami Dolphins.

On January 30, 2017, McGeoghan was named WR coach of the Buffalo Bills.
