= North Worcester Aid Society =

- U.S. National Register of Historic Places
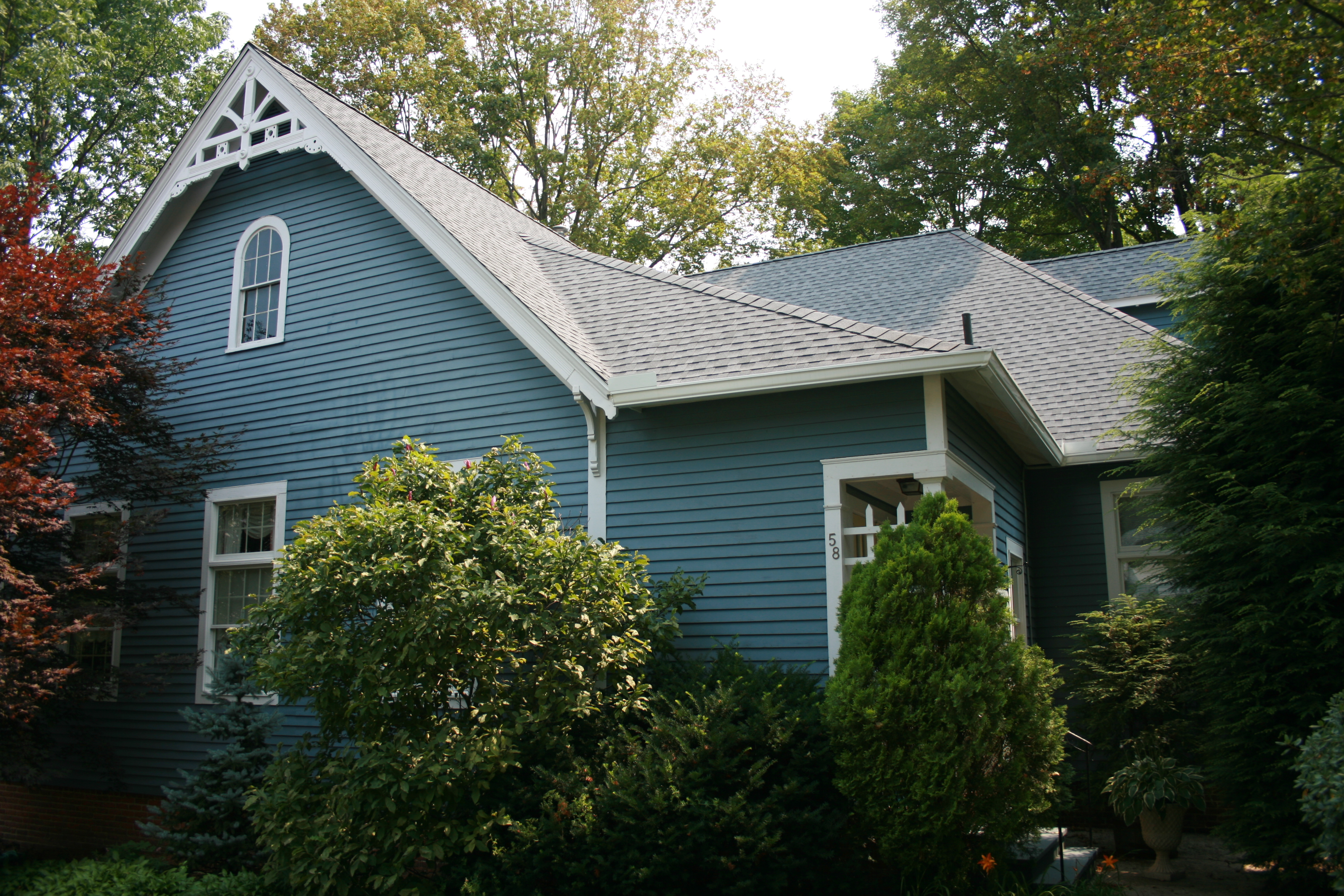

- Location within Massachusetts Location within the United States
- Location: 58 Holden St., Worcester, Massachusetts
- Coordinates: 42°17′59″N 71°49′4″W
- Built: 1887; 1928
- Architect: G. Adolph Johnson (1928)
- Architectural style: Late Victorian
- MPS: Worcester MRA
- NRHP reference No.: 80000512
- Added to NRHP: March 05, 1980

The North Worcester Aid Society was a charitable society based in Worcester, Massachusetts. It was founded in 1874 to provide clothing for children orphaned during the American Civil War. It met in a school on Holden Street until 1887, when land nearby was donated to the group, and its building at 58 Holden Street was built.

The society's building as originally built was a relatively simple 1 1/2-story wood-frame structure with minimal Queen Anne/Stick style decoration with a rectangular plan. In 1928 the southern wing and small porch were added, providing the society with dining and social space. This addition was designed by Worcester architect G. Adolph Johnson. The society was at its height in the 1940s, declining afterward. It was dissolved in 1990.

The building was listed on the National Register of Historic Places in 1980. It is now a private residence.

== See also ==
- National Register of Historic Places listings in northwestern Worcester, Massachusetts
- National Register of Historic Places listings in Worcester County, Massachusetts
