= Phillipston, Massachusetts =

- Town
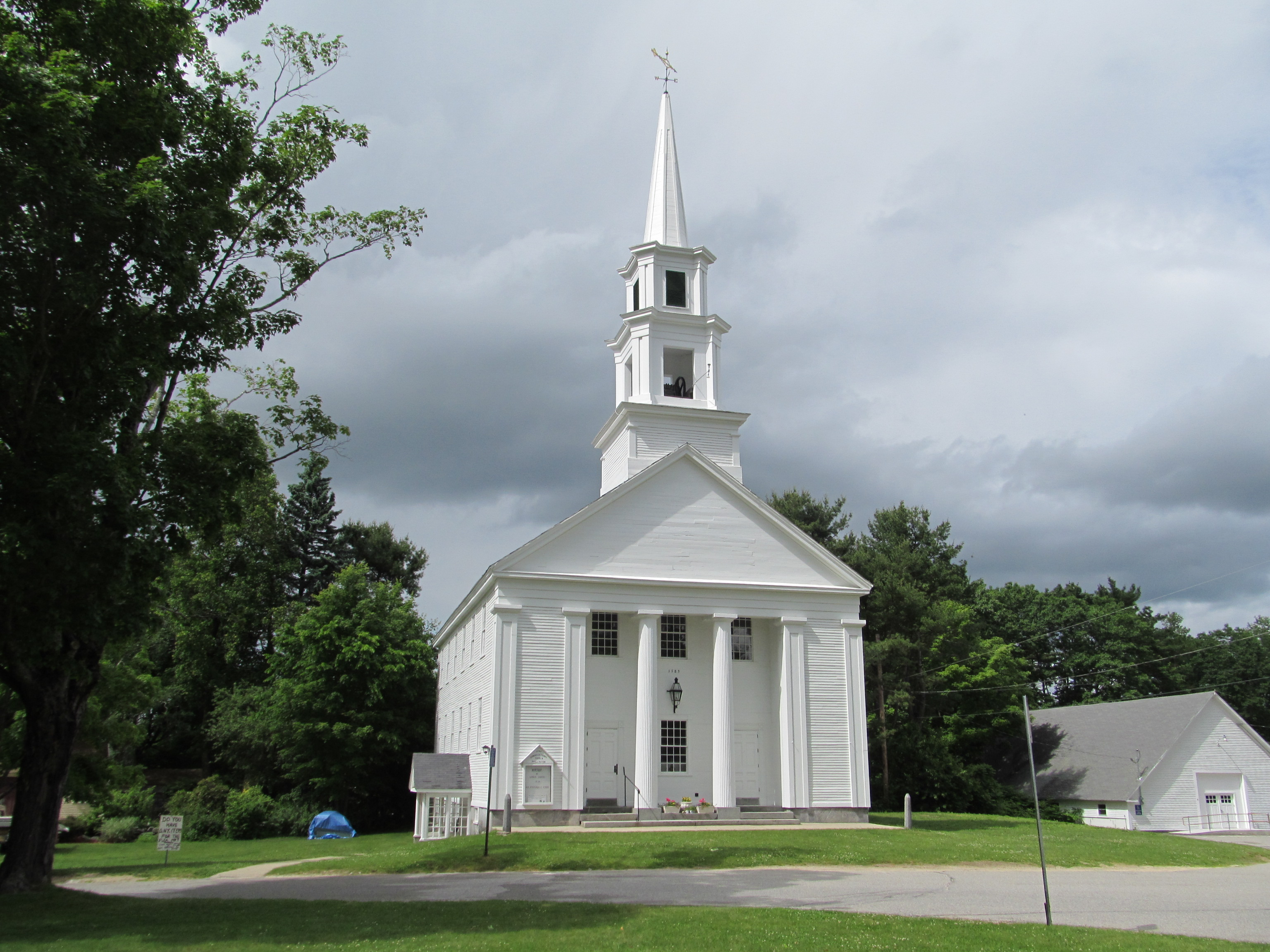
- Congregational Church

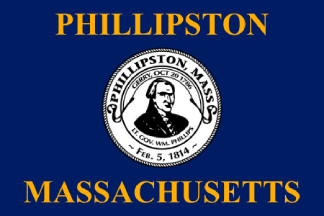
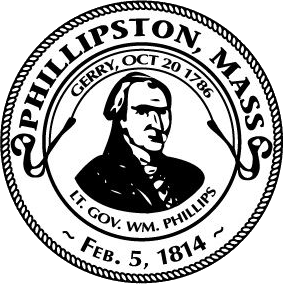
- Flag Seal

- Location in Worcester County and the state of Massachusetts.
- Coordinates: 42°32′55″N 72°08′00″W
- Country: United States
- State: Massachusetts
- County: Worcester
- Settled: 1751
- Incorporated: 1786

Government
  - Type: Open town meeting
  - Administrative Assistant: Susan Varney

Area
  - Total: 24.6 sq mi (63.8 km^{2})
  - Land: 24.2 sq mi (62.8 km^{2})
  - Water: 0.39 sq mi (1.0 km^{2})
- Elevation: 1,165 ft (355 m)

Population (2020)
  - Total: 1,724
  - Density: 71.1/sq mi (27.5/km^{2})
- Time zone: UTC−5 (Eastern)
  - Summer (DST): UTC−4 (Eastern)
- ZIP Code: 01331
- Area code: 351/978
- FIPS code: 25-53225
- GNIS feature ID: 0619487
- Website: www.phillipston-ma.gov

Phillipston is a town in Worcester County, Massachusetts, United States. The population was 1,724 at the 2020 census.

== History ==
Phillipston was first settled in 1751, and incorporated as the town of Gerry, after the politician Elbridge Gerry, on October 20, 1786, after separating from Templeton. The name was changed to Phillipston on February 5, 1814, after William Phillips, Jr., the tenth Lieutenant Governor of Massachusetts

In 1941, Elliott Laurel was gifted to The Trustees of Reservations.

The Phillipston Center Historic District and the Searles Hill Cemetery were designated on the National Register of Historic Places, in 1999 and 2011 respectively.

== Geography ==
According to the United States Census Bureau, the town has a total area of 24.6 square miles (64 km^{2}), of which 24.3 square miles (63 km^{2}) is land and 0.4 square miles (1.0 km^{2}), or 1.54%, is water.

Phillipston is bordered by Petersham to the southwest, Athol to the northwest, Royalston to the north, Templeton to the east, Hubbardston to the southeast, and a small portion of Barre to the south.

== Demographics ==
Historical population
Year	Pop.	±%
1790	740	—
1850	809	+9.3%
1860	764	−5.6%
1870	693	−9.3%
1880	621	−10.4%
1890	502	−19.2%
1900	441	−12.2%
1910	426	−3.4%
1920	354	−16.9%
1930	357	+0.8%
1940	481	+34.7%
1950	638	+32.6%
1960	695	+8.9%
1970	872	+25.5%
1980	953	+9.3%
1990	1,485	+55.8%
2000	1,621	+9.2%
2010	1,682	+3.8%
2020	1,724	+2.5%
2022*	1,720	−0.2%
* = population estimate. Source: United States census records and Population Estimates Program data.

As of the census of 2000, there were 1,621 people, 580 households, and 443 families residing in the town. The population density was 66.8 inhabitants per square mile (25.8/km^{2}). There were 739 housing units at an average density of 30.5 per square mile (11.8/km^{2}). The racial makeup of the town was 97.72% White, 0.37% African American, 0.12% Native American, 0.37% Asian, and 1.42% from two or more races. Hispanic or Latino of any race were 0.43% of the population.

There were 580 households, of which 39.5% had children under the age of 18 living with them, 63.8% were married couples living together, 8.1% had a female householder with no husband present, and 23.6% were non-families. 17.6% of all households were made up of individuals, and 5.0% had someone living alone who was 65 years of age or older. The average household size was 2.79 and the average family size was 3.19.

In the town, the population was spread out, with 29.2% under the age of 18, 5.2% from 18 to 24, 33.3% from 25 to 44, 24.7% from 45 to 64, and 7.5% who were 65 years of age or older. The median age was 37 years. For every 100 females, there were 101.1 males. For every 100 females age 18 and over, there were 106.7 males.

The median income for a household in the town was $46,845, and the median income for a family was $52,011. Males had a median income of $39,231 versus $25,625 for females. The per capita income for the town was $18,706. About 3.8% of families and 5.8% of the population were below the poverty line, including 8.5% of those under age 18 and 4.0% of those age 65 or over.

== Government ==
State government
State Representative(s):	Susannah Whipps Lee (I)
State Senator(s):	Peter J. Durant (R)
Governor's Councilor(s):	Jen Caissie (R)
Federal government
U.S. Representative(s):	James P. McGovern (D-2nd District),
U.S. Senators:	Elizabeth Warren (D), Ed Markey (D)

== Education ==
Phillipston is part of the Narragansett Regional School District, along with Templeton. Previously, the town served one public elementary school, the Phillipston Memorial School, but was closed recently, so elementary school students attend Templeton Memorial School in Templeton. Middle School students attend Narragansett Regional Middle School, and high school students attend Narragansett Regional High School. In 1948, the architect G. Adolph Johnson designed the Phillipston Memorial School. Additionally, Mount Wachusett Community College serves the area.

== Library ==
The Phillips Free Public Library of Phillipston was founded in 1860. In fiscal year 2008, the town of Phillipston spent 1.08% ($31,203) of its budget on its public library—approximately $17 per person, per year ($20.82 adjusted for inflation to 2021).

== Notable people ==
- Charlotte Barnum, mathematician
- Thomas H. White, industrialist

== See also ==
- List of places in the United States named after people
