= Duprey Building =

- U.S. National Register of Historic Places
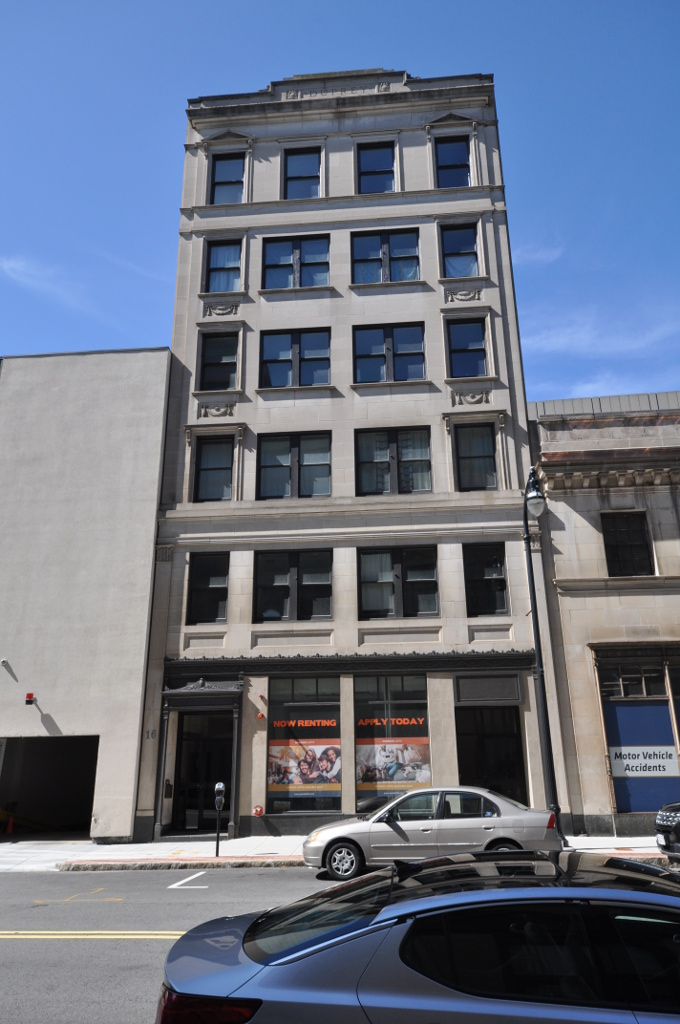

- Location within Massachusetts Location within the United States
- Location: 16 Norwich St., Worcester, Massachusetts
- Coordinates: 42°15′51″N 71°48′3″W
- Area: less than one acre
- Built: 1926
- Architect: Jasper Rustigian
- Architectural style: Classical Revival
- NRHP reference No.: 100004336
- Added to NRHP: September 5, 2019

The Duprey Building is a historic commercial building at 16 Norwich Street in downtown Worcester, Massachusetts. Built in 1926, it is a good example of a commercial Classical Revival building, built by a prominent local developer. The building was listed on the National Register of Historic Places in 1980. It is now mostly occupied by residences.

== Description and history ==
The Duprey Building is located in downtown Worcester, on the west side of Norwich Street, a one-block street paralleling Main Street between Foster and Pearl Streets. It is a six-story structure, built with steel frame construction finished in limestone and brick. The ground floor has two central window bays, flanked by an entrance to the retail space on that floor, and by the entrance to the upper floors. The upper floors are also four bays wide, with single sash windows in the outer bays and doubled sash windows in the inner ones. Trim details vary by floor, but are generally Classical Revival in style. Corinthian pilasters flank the bottom two floors, and a cornice separates the second and third floors. A low parapet incised with "DUPREY" crowns the facade.

The building was built in 1926 by Philip Duprey, a prominent local real estate developer and businessman, best known for his ownership of the Worcester Lunch Car Company. It was designed by Jasper Rustigian, an Armenian immigrant who trained at the Worcester architectural firm Fuller & Delano. The upper levels of the building were originally filled with professional offices, including those of Duprey's real estate business. The upper levels have recently (2017–18) been converted into residential space.

== See also ==
- National Register of Historic Places listings in northwestern Worcester, Massachusetts
- National Register of Historic Places listings in Worcester County, Massachusetts
