= Carl Beane =

American sports radio broadcaster (1952–2012)

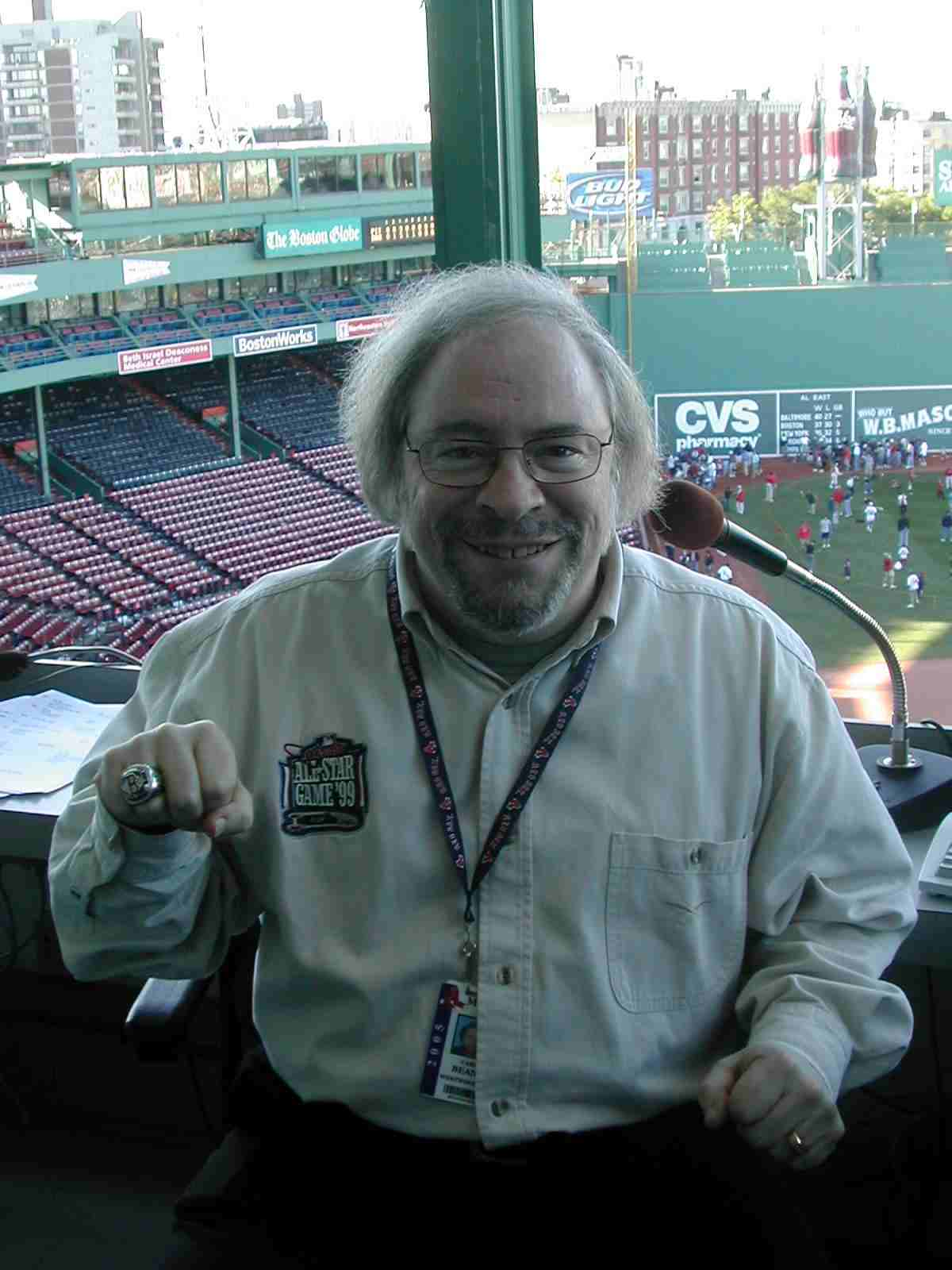
- Beane with his 2004 World Series ring
- Born: September 18, 1952; Agawam, Massachusetts
- Died: May 9, 2012 (aged 59); Sturbridge, Massachusetts
- Resting place: Holland Cemetery; Holland, Massachusetts
- Occupation: Sports radio broadcaster
- Years active: 1972–2012
- Known for: Public address announcer for the Boston Red Sox

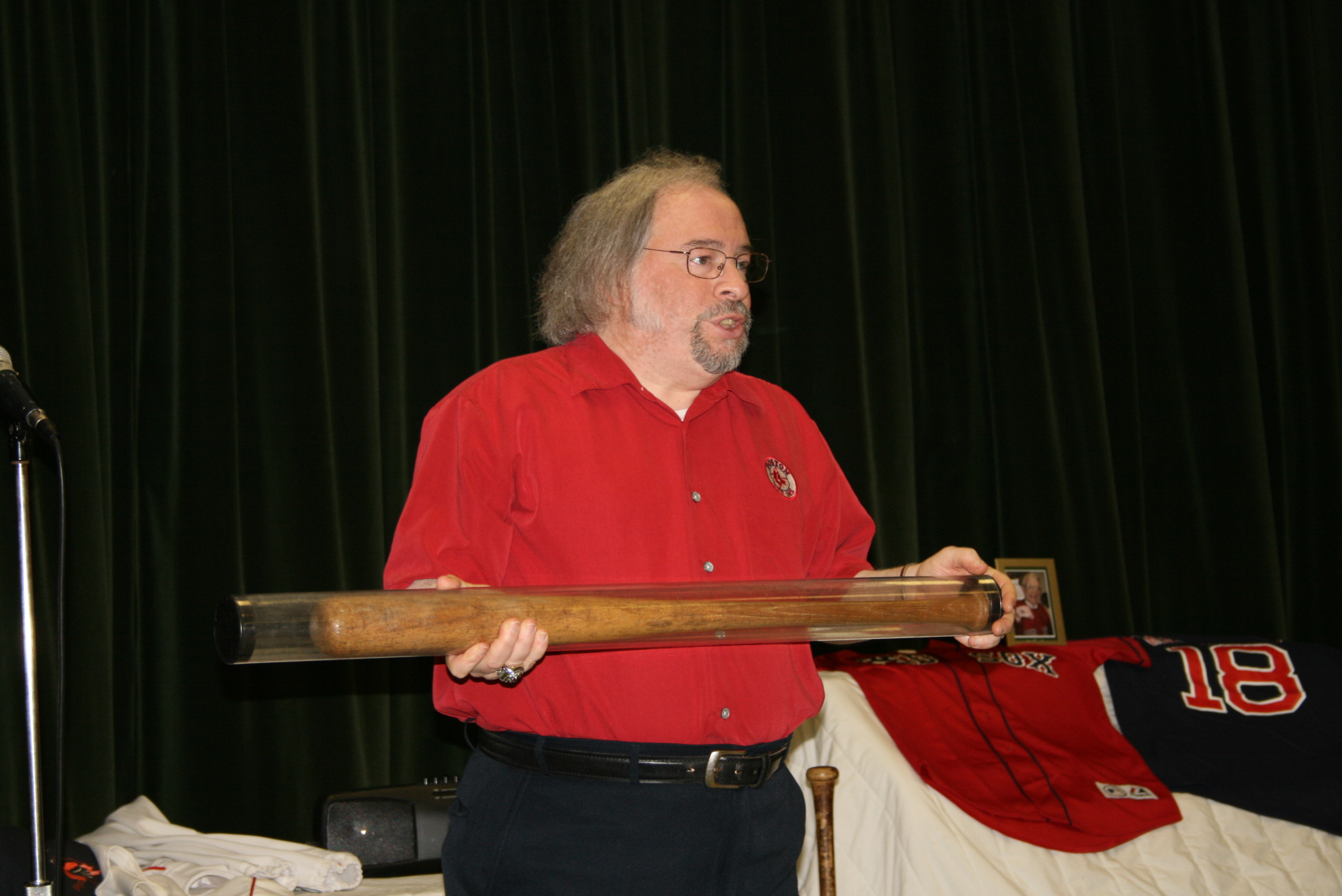
Beane during a 2007 speaking engagement showing some of his baseball memorabilia

Carleton E. "Carl" Beane (September 18, 1952 – May 9, 2012) was a sports radio broadcaster from 1972 until 2012, and was best known as the public address announcer for the Boston Red Sox of Major League Baseball. From 2003 until 2012, Beane was behind the microphone of every home game at Fenway Park, including Games 1 and 2 of the 2004 and 2007 World Series, opening each game with the words "Ladies and gentlemen, boys and girls, welcome to Fenway Park".

== Career ==
During his career, Beane was a broadcaster for many outlets, including ESPN Radio, Sirius Satellite Radio, Westwood One, and the Associated Press. He also taught sports broadcasting at the Connecticut School of Broadcasting's campus in Needham, Massachusetts, until it was closed in 2009.

In 2003, the Boston Red Sox hired Beane to replace Ed Brickley as the PA announcer at Fenway, the position he would hold for the remainder of his life.

As the Red Sox' PA announcer, Beane's voice was featured in the 2005 film Fever Pitch, and in an exhibit at the National Baseball Hall of Fame in Cooperstown, New York.

== Personal life ==
A native of Agawam, Massachusetts, Beane graduated from Agawam High School in 1971 and the Career Academy School of Broadcasting in 1972. He was a national spokesman for the American Diabetes Association, and a narrator for Talking Books at the Perkins School for the Blind. Carl was married for nearly twenty years to his wife Lorraine. Carl Beane had one biological daughter named Nicole Ashley, born in 1993.

== Death ==
On May 9, 2012, Beane suffered a heart attack while he was driving in Sturbridge, Massachusetts. His car crashed into a tree and a rock wall. He was pronounced dead at a nearby hospital. The following day's Red Sox game was played with no PA announcements, as a tribute to him. He was buried in Holland Cemetery in Holland, Massachusetts.
