= Robinson State Park =

State park in Hampden County, Massachusetts

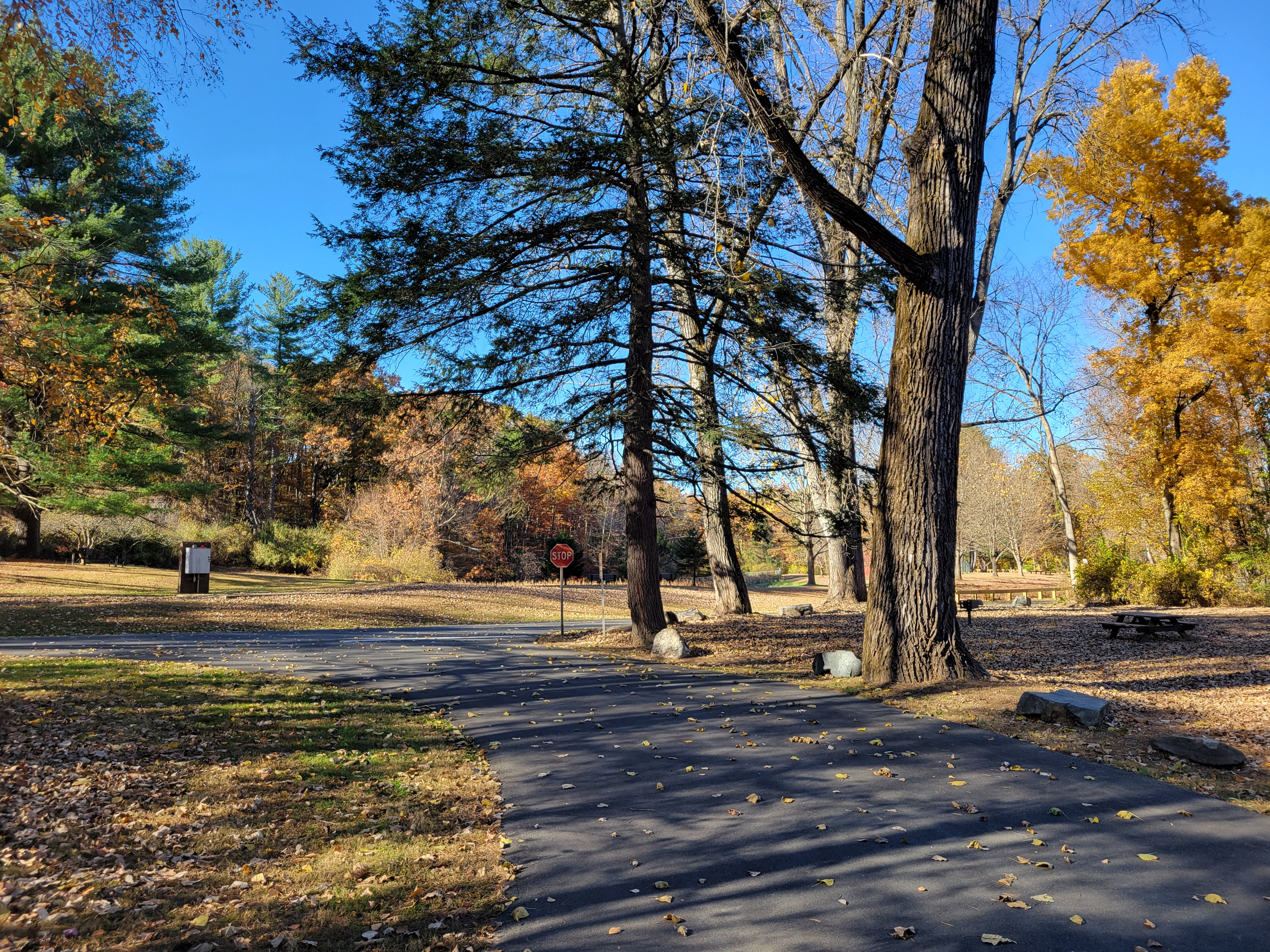

- Location within Massachusetts Location within the United States
- Location: Agawam, Massachusetts, United States
- Coordinates: 42°05′05″N 72°39′50″W
- Area: 1,025 acres (415 ha)
- Elevation: 98 ft (30 m)
- Established: 1934
- Administrator: Massachusetts Department of Conservation and Recreation
- Named for: John C. Robinson
- Website: Official website

Robinson State Park is a public recreation area in the United States located mostly in the town of Agawam with a small section in Westfield, Massachusetts. The narrow, 1,025-acre (415 ha) state park follows the course of the meandering Westfield River which forms the park's northern border. The park is managed by the Massachusetts Department of Conservation and Recreation.

== History ==
The park originated with land donations made to the state for recreational purposes by Springfield businessman John C. Robinson in 1934 and 1937. Robinson was an early proponent of the Eastern States Exposition, which lies one mile east of the park. The riverside had been intended for industrial development when Robinson began making purchases of small parcels in 1920, with the aim of creating an area preserved for recreation.

== Ecology ==
The park's variable levels of terrain and proximity to the Westfield River make it ideal to host a wide variety of species of plants and animals, making it among the most diverse and rarest forests in Massachusetts. A variety of wildflowers, some rare, threatened, or endangered exist in the park. Some animals that have been spotted in the park from time to time include fisher cat, otter, beaver, deer, coyote, red fox, bear, egrets, pairs of bald eagles, owl, mountain lion and moose. Many migratory birds use the park as a place to stop on their journey, thus many birdwatchers frequent Robinson State Park as the community of birds can change daily.

== Activities and amenities ==
The park has 20 miles (32 km) of trails and paved roads for hiking, cycling, and cross-country skiing. Some trails are accessible for strollers and wheelchairs. The swimming area was closed permanently in 2024 due to water quality. Picnicking, canoeing, and fishing are also available.

The park is home to the Agawam High School Cross Country teams.
