= Agawam, Massachusetts =

- City
- Town of Agawam^{[*]}
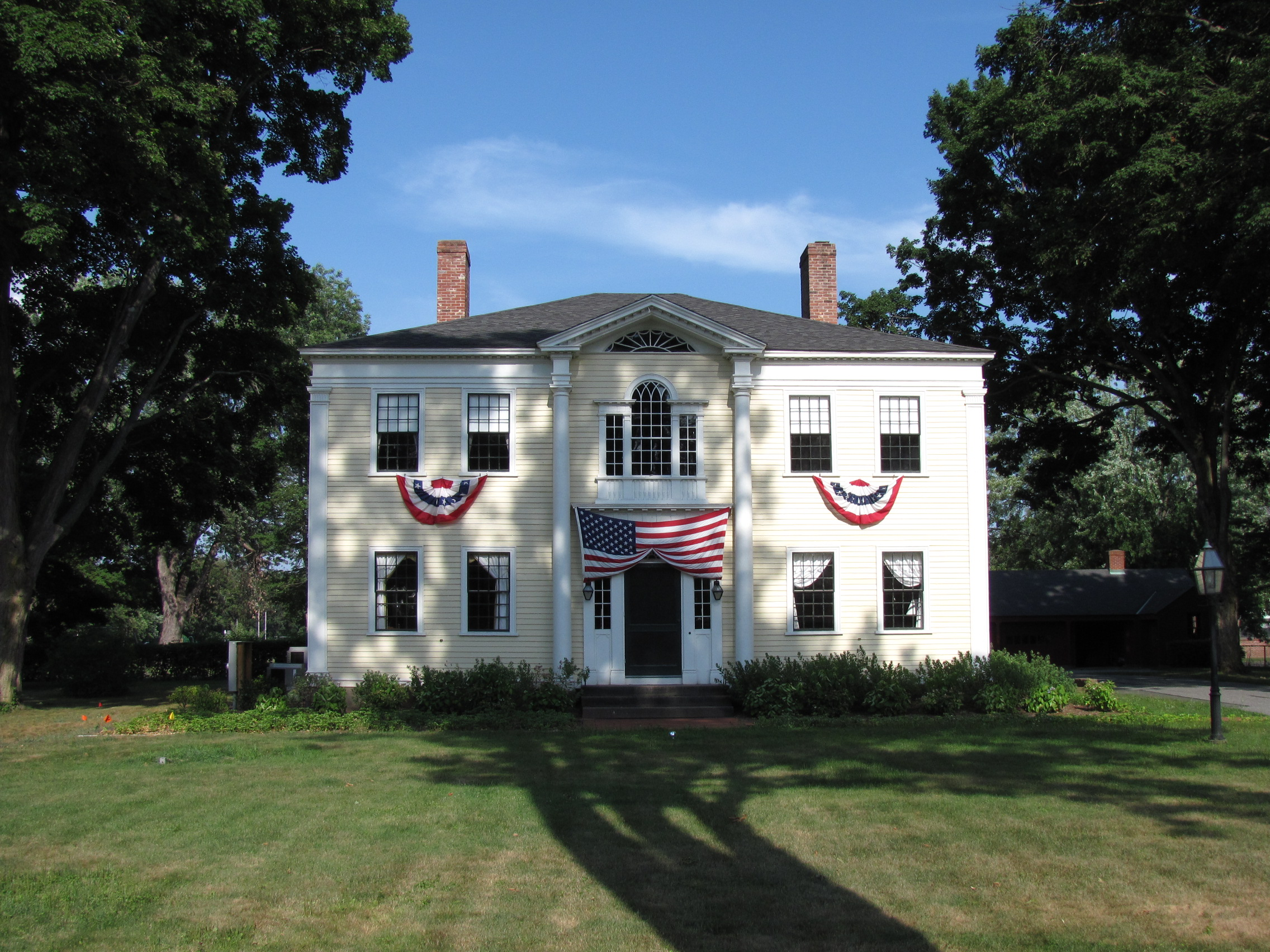
- Capt. Charles Leonard's house

- Flag Seal

- Location in Hampden County in Massachusetts

- Location within Massachusetts Location within the United States Location within North America
- Coordinates: 42°04′10″N 72°36′55″W
- Country: United States
- State: Massachusetts
- County: Hampden
- Settled: May 15, 1636
- Incorporated (town): May 17, 1855
- Incorporated (city): January 1, 1973

Government
  - Type: Mayor-council city
  - Mayor: Christopher Johnson

Area
  - Total: 24.34 sq mi (63.03 km^{2})
  - Land: 23.32 sq mi (60.40 km^{2})
  - Water: 1.01 sq mi (2.62 km^{2})
- Elevation: 89 ft (27 m)

Population (2020)
  - Total: 28,692
  - Density: 1,230.3/sq mi (475.01/km^{2})
- Time zone: UTC−5 (Eastern)
  - Summer (DST): UTC−4 (Eastern)
- ZIP Codes: 01001 (Agawam); 01030 (Feeding Hills)
- Area code: 413
- FIPS code: 25-00840
- GNIS feature ID: 0608970
- Website: www.agawam.ma.us

Agawam is a city in Hampden County, Massachusetts, United States. The population was 28,692 at the 2020 census. Agawam sits on the western side of the Connecticut River, directly across from Springfield. It is considered part of the Springfield Metropolitan Area, which is contiguous with the Knowledge Corridor area, the second-largest metropolitan area in New England. Agawam contains a subsection, Feeding Hills. The Six Flags New England (formerly known as Riverside Park, one of the largest such parks in the United States) amusement park is located in Agawam, on the banks of the Connecticut River.

Agawam's ZIP code, 01001, is the lowest standard ZIP code in the contiguous United States.

== Etymology ==
The Native American village originally sited on the west bank of the Connecticut River was known as Agawam, or Agawanus, Aggawom, Agawom, Onkowam, Igwam, and Auguam. It is variously speculated to mean "unloading place" and "fishcuring place", perhaps in reference to fish at Agawam Falls being unloaded from canoes for curing on the flats at the mouth of the Westfield River.

The current city named Agawam in Massachusetts should not be confused with other locations in Massachusetts that were historically known by the same or similar names. Springfield was founded in 1636 by William Pynchon as Agawam Plantation, under the administration of the Connecticut Colony. The town of Ipswich was also known as Agawam during much of the 17th century, after the English name for the Agawam tribe of Massachusetts, who were indigenous inhabitants of the area.

== History ==
On May 15, 1636, William Pynchon purchased land on both sides of the Connecticut River from the local Pocomtuc Indians known as Agawam, which included present-day Springfield, Chicopee, Longmeadow, and West Springfield, Massachusetts. The purchase price for the Agawam portion was 10 coats, 10 hoes, 10 hatchets, 10 knives, and 10 fathoms of wampum. Agawam and West Springfield separated from Springfield to become the parish of West Springfield in 1757; Agawam and West Springfield split in 1800. Agawam incorporated as a town on May 17, 1855.

In 1771, John Porter moved to Agawam and founded a gin distillery nine years later. After he died, his grandson, Harry, continued to work the business as the H. Porter Distilling Company. The plant was sold in 1917, and during Prohibition, the main products produced in the building were potato chips and cider. After the Volstead Act was repealed, the mill began producing gin again but closed permanently in 1938. The building, on Main Street near River Road, served as Agawam's Department of Public Works garage until it fell into disrepair.

Agawam furnished 172 men who fought in the American Civil War, 22 of whom died in battle or of disease.

The original town hall, built in 1874 at the corner of Main and School Streets, housed the town government divisions as the current one does today, as well as the original town library located in the building's Tower Room. A small school building was located near the premises and held grades one through three. The building was demolished in 1938, and the property is now the site of Benjamin Phelps Elementary School.

The Feeding Hills town hall, built in 1906, was almost identical to the Agawam town hall and was located at the corner of Springfield and South Westfield Streets. The building was demolished in 1950, and the Clifford M. Granger Elementary School opened in 1946 now occupies that land.

May 29, 1930, and June 1, 1931, saw "grand openings" of Bowles Agawam Airport with the latter date including a visit from 100 biplanes of the United States Army Air Corps Eastern Air Arm. A scheduled air service operated out of Bowles for approximately one year, before ending. The airport continued to operate as a civil airport until 1982. A pari-mutuel horse racing track, including grandstand and stables, was built adjacent to Bowles Airport. Seabiscuit won the Springfield Handicap at Agawam in track record time in October 1935. The racetrack operated until pari-mutuel betting was outlawed by referendum in Hampden County in November 1938. The airport also had plans in the early 1960s to become a commercial airport and host airlines for the city of Springfield, but plans were shelved. The airport and racetrack were demolished in the late 1980s and the area is now an industrial park.

== Geography ==
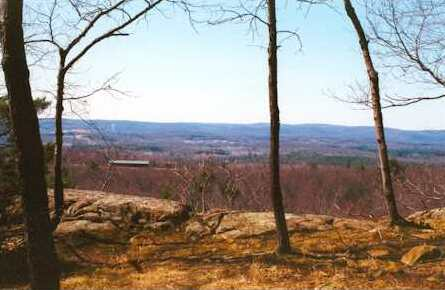
View from Provin Mountain, the highest point in Agawam.

Agawam is located at 42°4′19″N 72°38′39″W (42.071961, –72.644097). The city borders West Springfield, Massachusetts, to the north, Southwick, Massachusetts, to the west, Longmeadow, Massachusetts, to the east, Springfield, Massachusetts, to the northeast, and Suffield, Connecticut, to the south. Westfield, Massachusetts, also borders to the northwest.

According to the United States Census Bureau, the city has a total area of 24.2 square miles (63 km^{2}) of which 23.2 square miles (60 km^{2}) is land and 1 square mile (3 km^{2}) (4.09%) is water.

The highest point in Agawam is the 640-foot (195 m)-tall Provin Mountain, a ridge that, along with the southern part of East Mountain, forms the western boundary of the city. Both are traversed by the Metacomet-Monadnock Trail and are part of the Metacomet Ridge, a mountainous trap rock ridgeline that stretches from Long Island Sound to nearly the Vermont border.

Agawam has a subsection known as Feeding Hills that runs along the border of Southwick and Westfield, Massachusetts, and Suffield, Connecticut. Its border with Agawam was mainly determined by Line Street, and its ZIP code is 01030.

== Demographics ==
Historical population
Year	Pop.	±%
1860	1,698	—
1870	2,001	+17.8%
1880	2,216	+10.7%
1890	2,352	+6.1%
1900	2,536	+7.8%
1910	3,501	+38.1%
1920	5,023	+43.5%
1930	7,095	+41.3%
1940	7,842	+10.5%
1950	10,166	+29.6%
1960	15,718	+54.6%
1970	21,717	+38.2%
1980	26,271	+21.0%
1990	27,323	+4.0%
2000	28,144	+3.0%
2010	28,438	+1.0%
2020	28,692	+0.9%
2024*	28,749	+0.2%
* = population estimate. Source: United States Census records and Population Estimates Program data. Source: U.S. Decennial Census

As of the census of 2010, there were 28,144 people, 11,260 households, and 7,462 families residing in the city. The population density was 1,210.9 inhabitants per square mile (467.5/km^{2}). There were 11,659 housing units at an average density of 501.6 per square mile (193.7/km^{2}). The racial makeup of the city was 96.71% White, 0.91% African American, 0.17% Native American, 0.98% Asian, 0.01% Pacific Islander, 0.43% from other races, and 0.80% from two or more races. Hispanic or Latino of any race were 1.83% of the population.

There were 11,260 households, out of which 28.9% had children under the age of 18 living with them, 53.4% were married couples living together, 9.8% had a female householder with no husband present, and 33.7% were non-families. 28.0% of all households were made up of individuals, and 11.3% had someone living alone who was 65 years of age or older. The average household size was 2.43 and the average family size was 3.01.

In the city, the population was spread out, with 22.1% under the age of 18, 6.5% from 18 to 24, 29.7% from 25 to 44, 25.1% from 45 to 64, and 16.7% who were 65 years of age or older. The median age was 40 years. For every 100 females, there were 90.5 males. For every 100 females age 18 and over, there were 86.9 males.

The median income for a household in the city was $49,390, and the median income for a family was $59,088. Males had a median income of $40,924 versus $30,428 for females. The per capita income for the city was $22,562. About 4.3% of families and 5.6% of the population were below the poverty line, including 6.7% of those under age 18 and 7.5% of those age 65 or over.

== Government ==
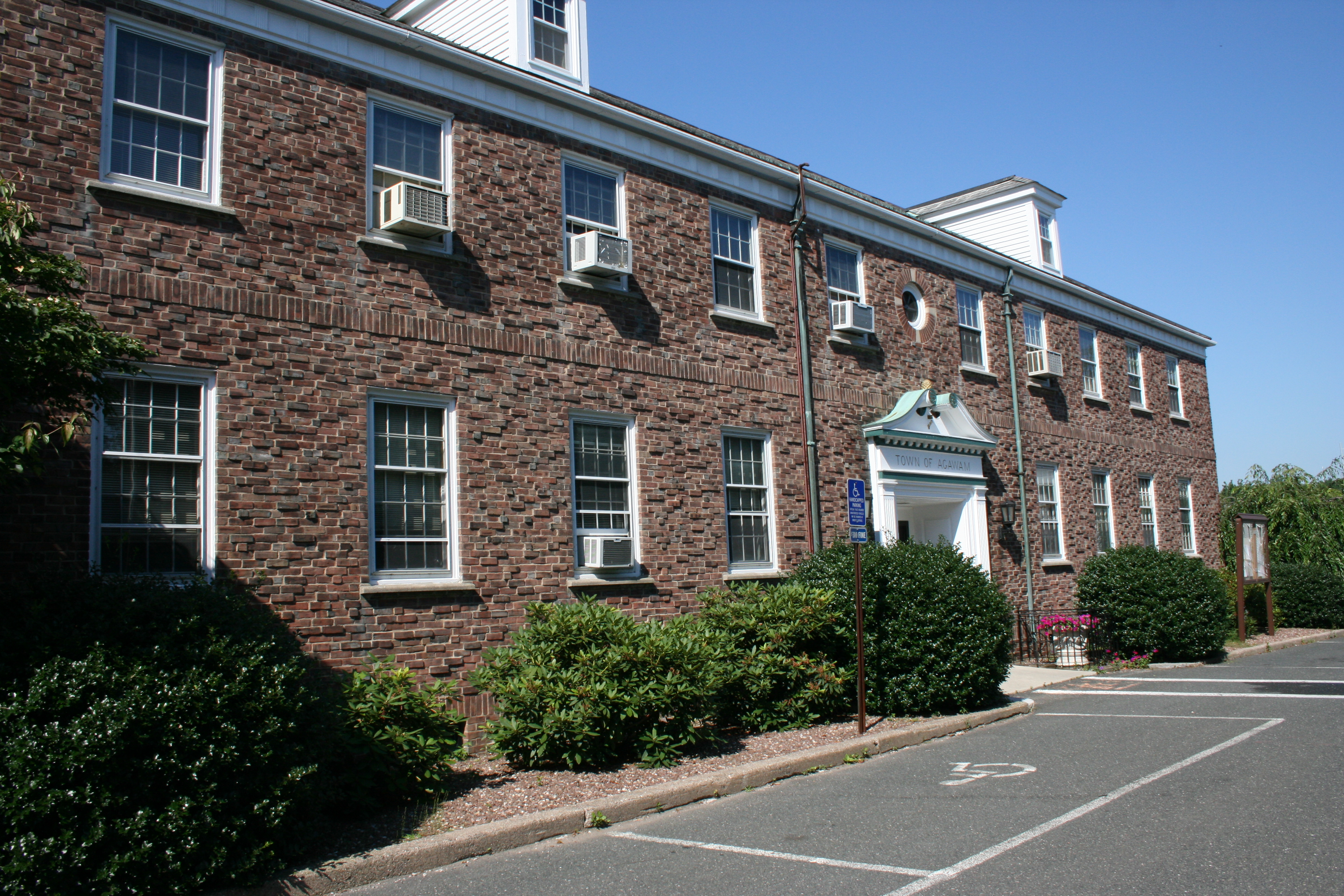
Agawam town hall

Agawam is one of thirteen Massachusetts municipalities that have applied for, and been granted, city forms of government but wish to retain "The town of" in their official names. Agawam adopted a city form of government effective January 1, 1973, comprising a 15-member city council and a town manager. Since May 1989 a mayor is the elected leader of the city. The current city council consists of eleven members elected at large by the voters and is the legislative branch of the town government.

The current mayor of Agawam is Christopher Johnson.

On the state level, Agawam is represented in the Massachusetts Senate by John Velis, and in the Massachusetts House of Representatives by Nicholas Boldyga. Agawam is located in the Eighth Massachusetts Governor's Council district and is represented by Tara Jacobs. On the federal level, Agawam is part of Massachusetts's 1st congressional district, represented by Richard Neal; it is represented in the United States Senate by Ed Markey and Elizabeth Warren.

Voter Registration and Party Enrollment as of February 1, 2025
Party	Number of Voters	Percentage
Democratic	4,169	18.15%
Republican	3,190	13.89%
Unaffiliated	15,291	66.57%
Political Designations	321	1.40%
Total	22,971	100%

=== Law enforcement ===
The Agawam Police Department has about fifty full-time sworn law enforcement officers and about eight support personnel. The department is responsible for law enforcement at the Six Flags New England amusement park and the Feeding Hills district.

On May 5, 2012, an Agawam officer shot a woman in the face when she answered her door. The city settled with her for $20,000.

In early January 2017, the head of the Agawam Police Patrolman's Association was indicted on charges relating to stealing from the group.

In mid-January 2017, three police officers were fired for using excessive force on a prisoner. The attack was caught on video which was released to the public. The officers are appealing their termination. Two of the officers returned to work following two years on paid administrative leave.

FBI crime statistics show the city enjoys a lower-than-average crime rate.

== Historical commercial operations ==
1801 – E. Porter Peppermint distillery, later to become the "Agawam Gin" distillery.

1810 – A cotton mill was erected on the site of present-day Six Flags New England.

1812 – Agawam Woolen Mill was established on Elm Street. After a fire, the building was rebuilt in brick in 1889 and still exists. The Agawam Woolen Company folded in 1949.

Six Flags New England, formerly Riverside Amusement Park, began as a picnic grove as early as 1840. It became a full-fledged amusement park in 1940. Riverside Park Speedway, a NASCAR racing track, was part of Riverside park from 1948 to 2000. Riverside was sold to Six Flags in 1996.

1952 – Stacy Machine Co, came to a new plant located on Main Street is best known for producing specialized printing presses. Later known as Kidder-Stacy, the plant closed in the 1990s, but the Main St plant still stands.

1953 – WWLP an NBC affiliate television station began operation with studios and transmitting facilities on Provin Mountain in Feeding Hills.

== Library ==
The Agawam Free Public Library was established in 1891. The first libraries were rooms in the Agawam and Feeding Hills town halls and the Mittenague School in North Agawam. After a 1904 fire destroyed the Mittenague School and all the books in it, Fred P. Halladay donated land and buildings in North Agawam to use as a library. In 1925, Minerva Porter Davis donated a building in Agawam Center to serve as the library in that section of town, replacing the Agawam Town Hall rooms. The Feeding Hills branch moved to a building across the street from the Feeding Hills town hall when that structure was removed to make way for Granger school. In 1978 the libraries were consolidated in a new building adjacent to the High School on Cooper Street.

In fiscal year 2008, the city of Agawam spent 1.39% ($923,113) of its budget on its public library—some $32 per person.

== Education ==
- Benjamin J. Phelps Elementary School: (K–4)
- Clifford M. Granger Elementary School: (K–4)
- James Clark Elementary School: (K–4)
- William P. Sapelli Elementary School: (K–4)
- Roberta G. Doering Middle School: (5–6)
- Agawam Junior High School: (7–8)
- Agawam High School: (9–12)

== Points of interest ==
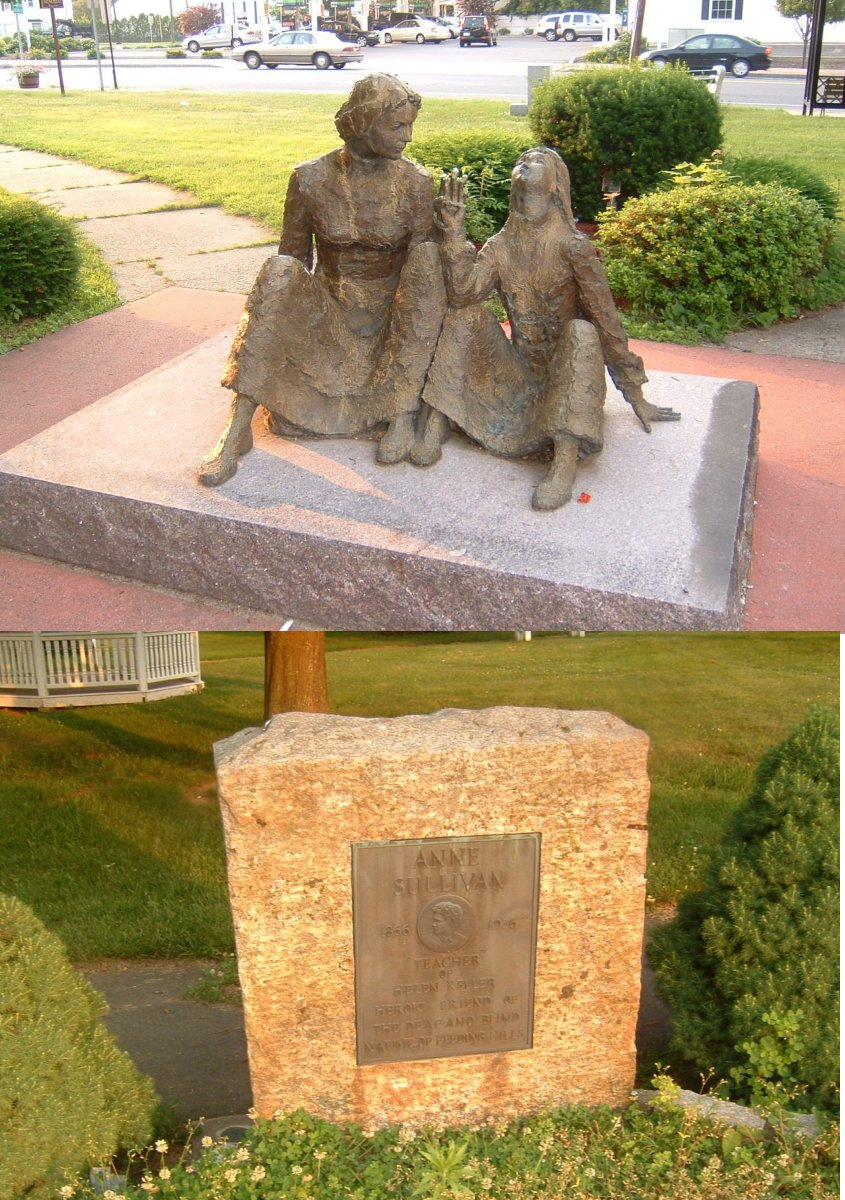
Anne Sullivan Memorial, Feeding Hills, MA

- The Agawam Historical Association operates the Agawam Historical and Fire House Museum at 35 Elm Street and the historic Thomas Smith House at 251 North West Street in Feeding Hills.
- Anne Sullivan Memorial – marker and statue dedicated to Helen Keller's tutor, born in Feeding Hills. The memorial is on the corner of Springfield and South Westfield Streets.
- The Massachusetts Veterans Memorial Cemetery at Agawam is located off Main Street.
- A series of plaques with the names of Agawam citizens who died in the Vietnam War, World War II, World War I, the Revolutionary War, or the Spanish–American War is displayed at Benjamin J. Phelps Elementary School.
- The 110 mile Metacomet-Monadnock Trail (a hiking trail) traverses the ridgeline of Provin Mountain in western Agawam.
- Robinson State Park, a narrow, urban 852-acre (3.45 km^{2}) park, has its entrance on North St.
- Six Flags New England, the largest amusement park in New England, is located in Agawam.

== Notable people ==
- Creighton Abrams, who commanded military operations in Vietnam War
- Carl Beane, voice of the Boston Red Sox
- Scott Daniels, Canadian Native hockey player that played in the NHL for Hartford Whalers, Philadelphia Flyers, and New Jersey Devils,
- Mark Faucette, NHL referee
- Roger LeClerc, football player for the Chicago Bears
- Mike Martin, basketball head coach, Brown University
- Phil McGeoghan, football player for the Denver Broncos, assistant coach Los Angeles Chargers
- Earl Seibert, hockey player, Hockey Hall of Famer, former Springfield Indians coach
- Eddie Shore, hockey player, Hockey Hall of Famer, owner of the Springfield Indians
- Anne Sullivan, tutor of Helen Keller
- Tom Wlaschiha, German actor, known for Game of Thrones and Stranger Things
