= Fairlawn (Worcester, Massachusetts) =

Historic house in Massachusetts, United States

- U.S. National Register of Historic Places
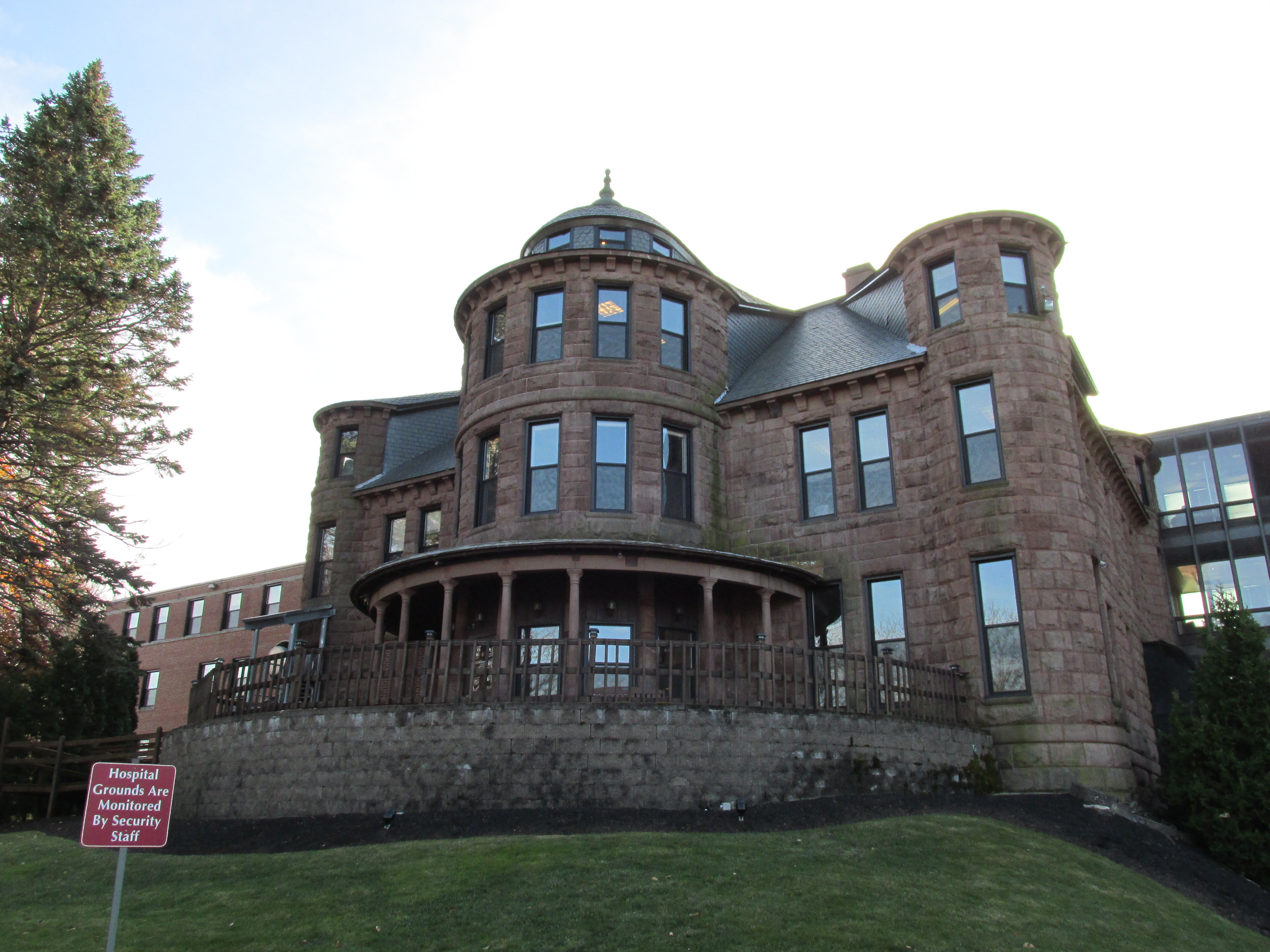
- Fairlawn

- Location within Massachusetts Location within the United States
- Location: 189 May St., Worcester, Massachusetts
- Coordinates: 42°15′37″N 71°50′10″W
- Built: 1893
- Architectural style: Eclectic Victorian
- MPS: Worcester MRA
- NRHP reference No.: 80000594
- Added to NRHP: March 05, 1980

Fairlawn is a historic mansion at 189 May Street in Worcester, Massachusetts. It is now part of the main building of the Fairlawn Rehabilitation Hospital. The mansion (and the accompanying estate) were the property of James Norcross, a nationally prominent builder whose Norcross Brothers firm was engaged in construction projects involving famous architects, including H. H. Richardson and McKim, Mead & White. The Norcross brothers were also locally prominent, building a number of Worcester landmarks and operating a factory in the city which produced architectural parts.

James Norcross moved to Worcester in 1868, and assembled 66 acres (27 ha) of land along May Street beginning in 1890. In 1893 he built the estate house, a brown sandstone building 2.5 stories high, measuring 70 feet (21 m) by 125 feet (38 m). Stylistically, the house is sui generis, although it has a number of architectural elements that were popular in the revival styles of the time. The front facade's main feature is a round bay, rising three full stories to a cupola, which is surrounded by a single story porch supported by slender round columns. A similar bay is centered on the rear facade, although it lacks the cupola. Each of the building's four corners has a rounded bay section rising three floors which is topped by a shed roof.

Norcross lived in the house until his death in 1903, and it remained in his family until 1922, when the estate was sold to the Fairlawn Rehabilitation Hospital. The hospital built additions to the house on each side (one c. 1951, the other in 1970), both built of brick. They are connected to the main house by narrow corridor sections, and do not detract from the main house's style. There is a stable behind the house which was likely also built by Norcross.

The house was listed on the National Register of Historic Places in 1980.

== See also ==
- National Register of Historic Places listings in southwestern Worcester, Massachusetts
- National Register of Historic Places listings in Worcester County, Massachusetts
