= Feeding Hills, Agawam, Massachusetts =

Feeding Hills
- Section of Agawam, Massachusetts
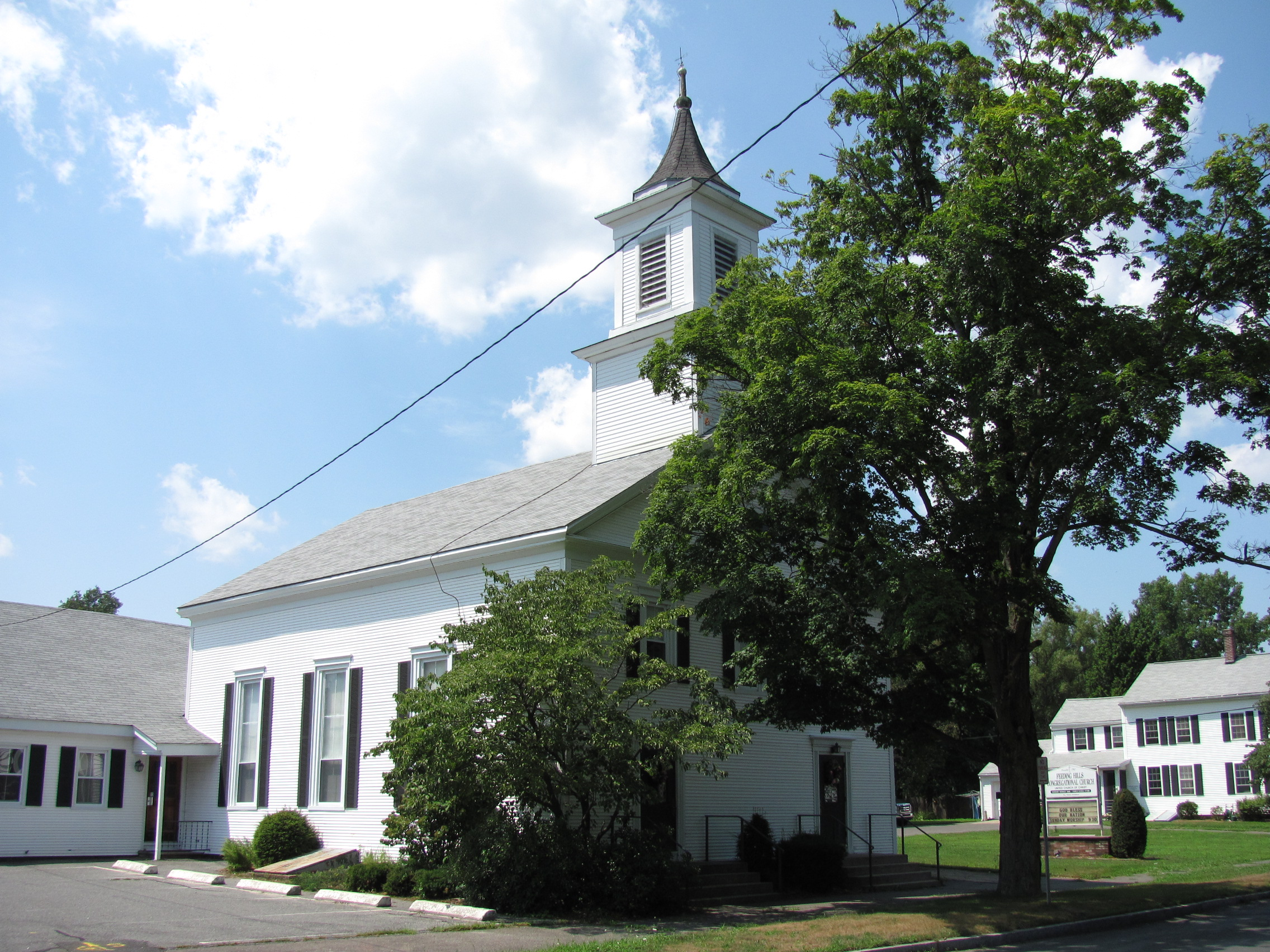
- Feeding Hills Congregational Church

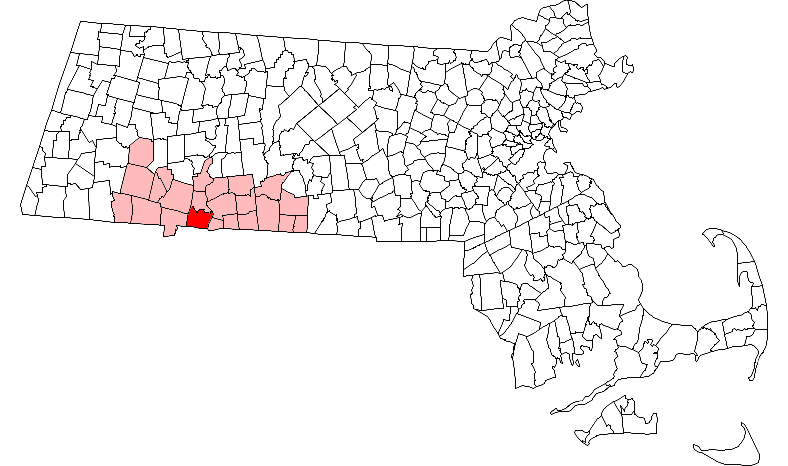
- Location of Agawam in Hampden County, Massachusetts
- Coordinates: 42°4′5.30″N 72°40′43.32″W
- Country: United States
- State: Massachusetts
- County: Hampden
- City/Town: Agawam
- Elevation: 660 ft (200 m)
- Time zone: UTC−5 (EST)
  - Summer (DST): UTC−4 (EST)
- ZIP Code: 01030
- Area code: 413

Feeding Hills is a section of the city of Agawam, Massachusetts, United States, with its own ZIP Code (01030) and post office. Line Street in Agawam is generally accepted by residents as being the unofficial border. In the early to mid-19th century, a ditch was dug here to separate the two sections. Feeding Hills contains one quarter of the total population, as well as Provin Mountain, the highest point in the town, and many moderate-sized farms.

Today, Feeding Hills is under extensive land development in and around the Provin Mountain communities. Several farms have been split up and sold to developers, resulting in an increased real estate market. Older sections of Feeding Hills, such as those closer to Line Street and Agawam High School, have remained much the same, although in recent years have experienced an exodus of businesses to other parts of town. Feeding Hills contains several churches, shopping centers, and a variety of eateries. It is home to WWLP-TV's transmitting site atop Provin Mountain (their studio has since moved to Chicopee).

Of Agawam's four elementary schools and three middle/junior/senior high schools, only the junior high school and Granger Elementary are located in Feeding Hills.

== Notable people ==
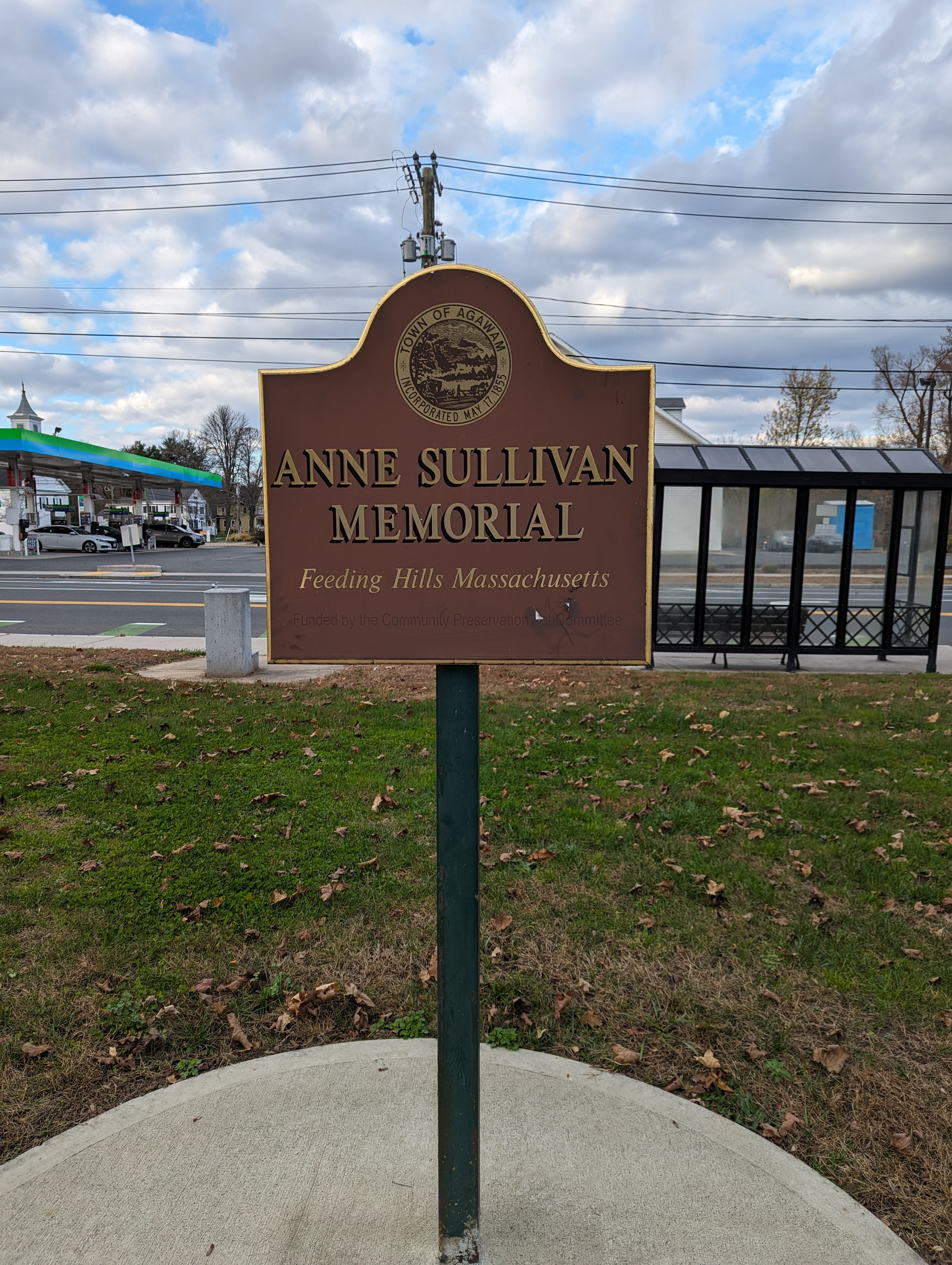
Anne Sullivan Memorial in Feeding Hills, Massachusetts

- Creighton Abrams, general in the US Army during Vietnam War, United States Army Chief of Staff from 1972 until his death in 1974
- Nick Petrangelo, professional poker player
- Anne Sullivan, tutor to Helen Keller
- Benjamin Wade, United States Senator from Ohio, a member of the Radical Republicans, was born here in 1800.
