= Senator Leavitt =

Senator Leavitt may refer to:

- Dixie L. Leavitt (1929–2026), Utah State Senate
- Humphrey H. Leavitt (1796–1873), Ohio State Senate
- John Hooker Leavitt (1831–1906), Iowa State Senate
- Jonathan Leavitt (1764–1830), Massachusetts State Senate
- Roger Hooker Leavitt (1805–1885), Massachusetts State Senate
