= Jonathan Leavitt (minister) =

American minister (1731–1802)

The Reverend Jonathan Leavitt
- Born: January 11, 1731; Suffield, Province of Massachusetts Bay (now Connecticut), British America
- Died: September 9, 1802 (aged 71); Heath, Massachusetts, U.S.
- Occupations: Congregationalist minister; pastor
- Spouses: Sarah Hooker (m. 1761; died 1791) Tirzah (Field) Ashley (m. 1792; died 1797) Mary Todd (m. 1798)
- Children: 12, including Jonathan
- Relatives: John Leavitt (paternal great-grandfather); Joshua Leavitt (grandson); Roger Hooker Leavitt (grandson); Hart Leavitt (grandson); John Hooker Leavitt (great-grandson)

Religious life
- Religion: Christianity
- Denomination: Congregationalism
- Church: Protestant
- Profession: Evangelist

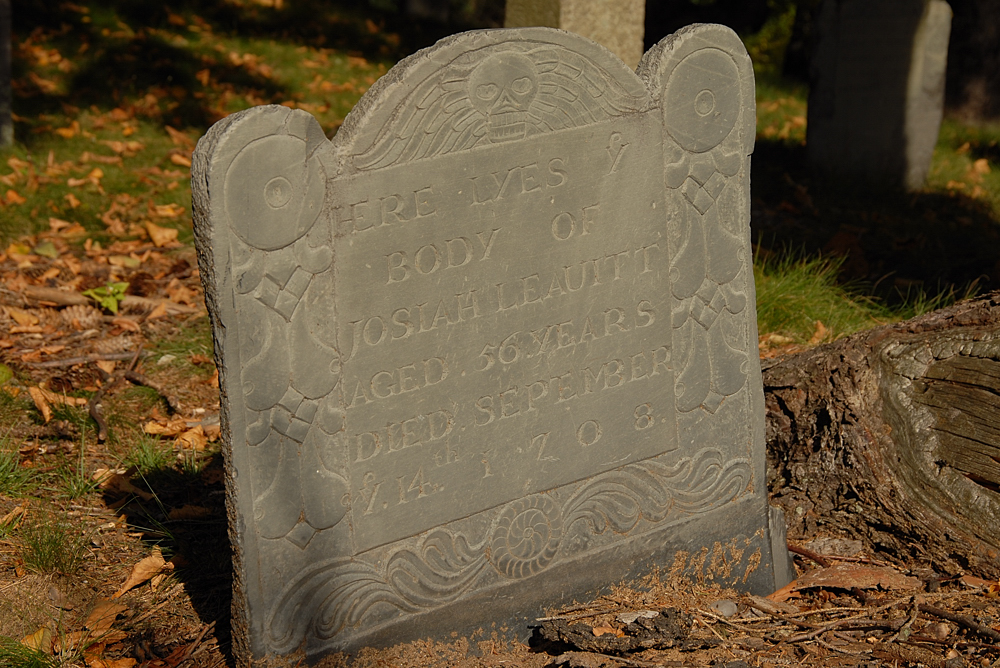
Gravestone of Josiah Leavitt, grandfather of Jonathan Leavitt, Hingham Cemetery, Hingham, Massachusetts

Rev. Jonathan Leavitt (January 11, 1731 – September 9, 1802) was an early New England Congregational minister, in Connecticut, and subsequently the pastor of churches in New Hampshire and Massachusetts, both of which dismissed him from his posts. Several of Rev. Leavitt's descendants became among the most noted abolitionists of their day, even though he himself was dismissed from one pastorate for allegedly abusing his runaway slave, and from another for his Loyalist sentiments.

== Early life and career beginnings ==
Jonathan Leavitt was born on January 11, 1731, in Suffield, Massachusetts, the son of Lieutenant Joshua Leavitt and his wife Mary Thomas (Winchell) Leavitt. Jonathan Leavitt was one of three children of Lieut. Leavitt and his second wife. The family was among the earliest settlers of Suffield, and were prosperous, his father Lieut. Leavitt a well-to-do farmer and officeholder. But before Rev. Leavitt was two years old, his father, a brother and a sister all perished of disease within three days of each other. Nevertheless, Rev. Leavitt and two of his brothers attended Yale College. His sister Jemima Leavitt married Capt. David Ellsworth, and became mother of Chief Justice of the United States and Founding Father Oliver Ellsworth.

Jonathan Leavitt graduated from Yale College in 1758 and afterwards was ordained minister of Walpole, New Hampshire, on May 27, 1761. On the occasion of his ordination, Rev. Leavitt's brother Rev. Freegrace Leavitt, a fellow Congregationalist minister, preached the installation sermon – at a local home as Walpole's meeting house had yet to be built.

The formal rigor of Congregationalism was in full bloom in Walpole, as elsewhere across the New England states. Rev. Leavitt wore a large, full-powdered wig, "and when he entered the meeting-house, the whole congregation rose to do obeisance to the man in black, who, in his turn, always responded with a full bow." Trailing the prime minister was his wife, Sarah (Hooker) Leavitt, great-granddaughter of Rev. Thomas Hooker, Puritan divine and founder of the state of Connecticut. Mrs. Leavitt was gotten up in "full suit of brocade lutestring, without any bonnet, holding a fan to shade the sun from her face, as was the fashion 'down country.'"

Leavitt's initial pay at Walpole was set at £75 sterling, and, as was the custom of the day, the financial terms of his contract were carefully delineated – with annual raises in pay stipulated in the document, as well as free use of a minister's house lot. But Leavitt's tenure was apparently tenuous from the start. Within three years, he was dismissed by the new congregation. Although the exact reason is unclear, the new Reverend was said to have been spotted being cruel to a slave.

"It is handed down that, having dragged home a negro slave, a woman, who had run away, by a rope attached to his saddle", according to a history of Walpole, "[prominent local citizen] Colonel Bellows declared that such cruelty should not be submitted to; that he had settled Parson Leavitt, and now he would unsettle him. Ministers, however, were not got rid of so easily in those days. Being settled for life, they had rights which they well understood; and it is plain that some considerable diplomacy was required to shake Mr. Leavitt off."

== Departure from Walpole and arrival in Massachusetts ==
On May 17, 1764, on the eve of a town meeting called to discuss Leavitt's tenure – and his act of cruelty towards his slave – the minister suddenly accepted a payment from the townsmen for services rendered and agreed to depart. Two years later, in 1767, Rev. Leavitt secured an appointment as the minister of Charlemont, Massachusetts, in the mountainous northwestern corner of the state. The congregation in the Berkshires was looking for a minister to pastor the town's first church, and Leavitt was selected.

But the imperious Leavitt once again got into trouble with his congregation. After arriving with his family to an auspicious beginning, Leavitt's Loyalist sentiments began to rub his congregants the wrong way. The matter of wardrobe might have complicated things. "Mr. Leavitt dressed in the costume of his day", noted a fellow minister. "He wore a great white wig and a cocked up hat, and made a dignified appearance. He would do more execution with one nod of his wig, than you or I could in talking half an hour."

Another ministerial colleague noted that Rev. Leavitt's sermons "are not fresh and beautiful by the imagination, not ardent and overflowing with love, but didactic, dry, and clean, and very long. His services were delivered in a dull monotony, and his prayers were incredibly long, in public and in family devotions."

Aside from matters of dress, comportment and diction, Leavitt possessed another trait which apparently sealed his fate: he was enamored with English colonial rule – a delicate subject anywhere in the American colonies, but especially among the hardscrabble rural settlers attempting to scratch a living from the Berkshire hill country. Whether because his congregants were hard-pressed, or because they objected to Leavitt's sympathies with mother England, they held back his pay. One rumor, never proved, was that the Reverend personally confiscated the only cows belonging to two of his poorer parishioners to pay his back salary.

== Departure from another church, later life and legacy ==
By 1777 matters came to a head. Leavitt refused to accept his salary in rapidly depreciating colonial currency. So the town voted to simply shut the church. A constable was dispatched to bar the offending reverend. But Leavitt would not be deterred. He moved his services to the town schoolhouse, where he continued to preach his long sermons for almost another decade. On April 15, 1785, he was finally turned out by the town, and his schoolhouse sermons came to an end. He then sued his parishioners for his back wages, as well as his loss on the depreciated colonial currency. Ultimately the litigious reverend was awarded some £700, and retired to his home in nearby Heath, Massachusetts.

Rev. Jonathan Leavitt spent the rest of his life at his home in Heath, and retired from the ministry. His wife, the former Sarah Hooker, died at Heath on October 11, 1791, when a daughter gave her the wrong medicine. Her husband Rev. Leavitt died on September 9, 1802, aged 71. In the year before his death, in 1801, Rev. Jonathan Leavitt published a book entitled The New Covenant and the Church's Duty.

The couple had 12 children – 11 sons and an only daughter. The daughter was Clarissa, who died unmarried; his sons were Jonathan, Hart, Joshua, David, Roger, Erastus, Roswell, Thomas, Samuel, Horatio, and Hooker. Jonathan Leavitt, the eldest son of Rev. Jonathan, became a prominent Greenfield, Massachusetts, attorney, judge, state senator and businessman. Two grandchildren became ministers – one of them was the noted abolitionist publisher and editor Rev. Joshua Leavitt, whose brothers Roger Hooker Leavitt and Hart Leavitt operated Underground Railroad stations to shelter escaped slaves on their journeys north to Canada.

A great-grandson of Rev. Jonathan Leavitt, John Hooker Leavitt, became an Iowa banker, and later published a book in 1904, two years before his death, about his controversial ancestor. Written by the banker's brother William Hooker Leavitt, a Minneapolis businessman, the slim volume was titled A Sketch of the Life and Character of Rev. Jonathan Leavitt, the first Minister of Charlemont, Mass. In it the two sibling descendants attempted to portray their ancestor as a misunderstood and complicated man.

== See also ==
- Joshua Leavitt
- Roger Hooker Leavitt
- Hart Leavitt
- John Hooker Leavitt
- Jonathan Leavitt
- Oliver Ellsworth
