= Dorsey House =

Dorsey House may refer to:

in the United States (by state then city)

- D. A. Dorsey House, Miami, Florida, listed on the National Register of Historic Places (NRHP)
- Holliday-Dorsey-Fife House, Fayetteville, Georgia, NRHP-listed in Fayette County
- Crawford-Dorsey House and Cemetery, Lovejoy, Georgia, NRHP-listed in Clayton County
- Thomas A. Dorsey Farmhouse, Carlisle, Kentucky, NRHP-listed in Nicholas County
- Dorsey Hall, Columbia, Maryland, NRHP-listed
- Dorsey-Palmer House, Hagerstown, Maryland, NRHP-listed
- Dorsey–Jones House, Northampton, Massachusetts, NRHP-listed
- Dorsey Mansion, Abbott, New Mexico, NRHP-listed
- Joseph Dorsey House, West Brownsville, Pennsylvania, NRHP-listed in Washington County
- Brown-Dorsey House, Midland, Texas, listed on the National Register of Historic Places listings in Midland County

== See also ==
- Dorsey Building, Lima, Ohio, NRHP-listed in Allen County
