= Hart Leavitt =

American merchant and politician (1809–1881)

- Born: December 19, 1809; Heath, Massachusetts, U.S.
- Died: April 15, 1881 (aged 71); Charlemont, Massachusetts, U.S.
- Occupations: Merchant; landowner; abolitionist activist; politician
- Spouse: Mary Miller (m. 1831)
- Children: 6
- Relatives: Jonathan Leavitt (paternal grandfather); Jonathan Leavitt (uncle); Joshua Leavitt (brother); Roger Hooker Leavitt (brother); John Hooker Leavitt (nephew)

Hart Leavitt (December 19, 1809 – April 15, 1881) was an American merchant, landowner, abolitionist activist, and politician. He was the brother of Roger Hooker Leavitt, with whom he operated an Underground Railroad station in Charlemont, Massachusetts, where the two brothers, aided by a third sibling in New York, the reformer and abolitionist publisher Joshua Leavitt, sheltered escaped slaves on their journey northward. The Massachusetts homes of Hart Leavitt and his brother Roger Hooker are both listed today on the National Park Service's Underground Railroad Network to Freedom.

== Biography ==
Hart Leavitt was born in Heath, Massachusetts in 1809, the son of landowner and Massachusetts legislator Roger Leavitt and his wife Chloe (Maxwell) Leavitt, and the grandson of Charlemont's first minister, Congregationalist Rev. Jonathan Leavitt, who was eventually turned out by the town for his Loyalist sentiments. Hart Leavitt graduated from Hopkins Academy, which his brother Roger Hooker Leavitt attended as well. The rest of his life he devoted to his substantial business affairs, handling his family's landholdings and serving in the town, county and state government. Leavitt eventually relocated to nearby Greenfield, where his uncle Jonathan Leavitt was a well-known judge. Hart Leavitt operated a store next door to his uncle Jonathan's law office. The store was the location for Greenfield's first newspaper and post office.

In October 1835 Hart Leavitt, along with brothers Roger Hooker and Joshua, attended a state convention held in Utica, New York, that was sponsored by the Utica Anti-Slavery Society. The convention's stated aim was to organize the New York Anti-Slavery Society. Hart Leavitt was one of a handful of delegates from outside New York. The convention was marred by violence by pro-slavery factions. Hart Leavitt's brother was already a fervent abolitionist, and following graduation from Yale Law School and Yale Divinity School, Rev. Joshua Leavitt had left both professions for the role of full-time editor of abolitionist and social reform publications including The Emancipator.

In December 1836 the Franklin County Anti-Slavery was formed, tying together the strands of regional abolitionist sentiment. Merchant Hart Leavitt was a representative to the meeting. By 1840 Hart's father Roger was president of the Franklin County Anti-Slavery Society, and a co-founder with his son Joshua of the American & Foreign Anti-Slavery Society. That year Roger Leavitt, Hart's father, accepted the nomination of the newly formed Massachusetts Liberty Party to run for state Lieutenant Governor on an abolitionist ticket. Hart Leavitt's mother Chloe had begun circulating a petition demanding the abolition of slavery in the District of Columbia.

Hart Leavitt seems to have been increasingly politically active from the mid-1830s onward. By the late 1830 Hart Leavitt was using his Charlemont farm as an Underground Railroad station, shuttling a succession of fugitive former slaves, the most prominent of whom was Basil Dorsey, whom the Leavitt family (the three brothers and their father) sheltered and hid from pro-slavery forces. Dorsey lived with the family for over five years, during which time he apparently moved from one family home to another, hidden in plain sight. Leavitt also sheltered other slaves on their way to Canada, and Leavitt's underground activities were extensive enough to prompt Ohio State University historian Wilbur Siebert to list Leavitt as an operator of the Franklin County underground network, calling the merchant "a sturdy abolitionist who did all he could to help slaves gain their freedom."

Hart Leavitt served as a Selectman for several years for the town of Heath, a member of the Massachusetts House of Representatives, as well as a Justice of the Peace and Franklin County Commissioner from Charlemont during his later life. Hart Leavitt also served the town of Charlemont as a Selectman during the Civil War. He married in 1831 Mary Miller, daughter of Rev. Moses Miller of Heath. The couple had six children: sons Edward Hart, Joseph Ware, Joshua, Roger, Spencer Miller; and daughter Mary. The home of Hart and Mary Leavitt, located outside Charlemont, is listed on the National Park Service's Network to Freedom.

== See also ==
- Joshua Leavitt
- Roger Hooker Leavitt
