= Dorsey–Jones House =

Historic house in Massachusetts, United States

- U.S. National Register of Historic Places
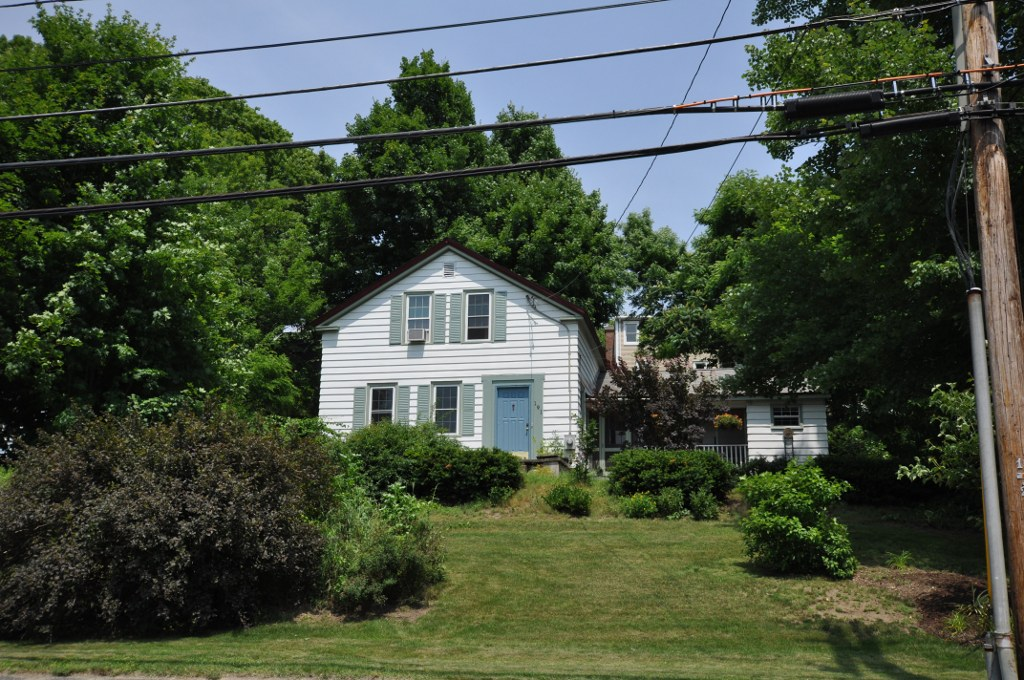
- Dorsey–Jones House in 2013

- Location within Massachusetts Location within the United States
- Location: 191 Nonotuck St., Northampton, Massachusetts
- Coordinates: 42°19′52″N 72°40′18″W
- Area: less than one acre
- Built: 1849
- Architectural style: Greek Revival
- MPS: Underground Railroad in Massachusetts MPS
- NRHP reference No.: 05000931
- Added to NRHP: September 2, 2005

The Dorsey–Jones House is a historic house located at 191 Nonotuck Street in the Florence area of Northampton, Massachusetts. Built in 1849, it is known to have been owned by two former slaves with well-documented escape histories. The house was added to the National Register of Historic Places in 2005.

== Description and history ==
The Dorsey–Jones House is located south of the village center of Florence, on the north side of Nonotuck Street a short way east of Maple Street. It is a 1 1/2-story wood-frame structure, with a gabled roof and clapboarded exterior. It follows a plan known as "upright and wing", a common building plan of the period that was often used for millworker housing in the area. It is an L-shaped structure with a prominent front-facing gable end. The main entrance is in the rightmost of three bays on this section. A single-story ell extends to the right of this section, with an open porch across its front.

The house was built in 1849 for Basil Dorsey, an African American who escaped slavery in 1836 with abolitionist help. The lot on which it was built was purchased from the Bensonville Manufacturing Company, the silk-making business of abolitionist George Benson. The Dorsey family lived in the house until 1852, when it moved to another Florence house. This house was purchased in 1854 by Mary Jones, the wife of Thomas H. Jones, another escaped slave and antislavery activist. An itinerant preacher, Jones was rarely present, and the family moved from Florence to Worcester in 1859. The escapes from slavery by both Dorsey and Jones are well-documented in contemporary papers of abolitionists and Underground Railroad operatives.

== See also ==
- Ross Farm (Northampton, Massachusetts), another Underground Railroad site associated with George Benson
- National Register of Historic Places listings in Hampshire County, Massachusetts
