= Mary Andrews Denison =

American novelist (1826–1911)

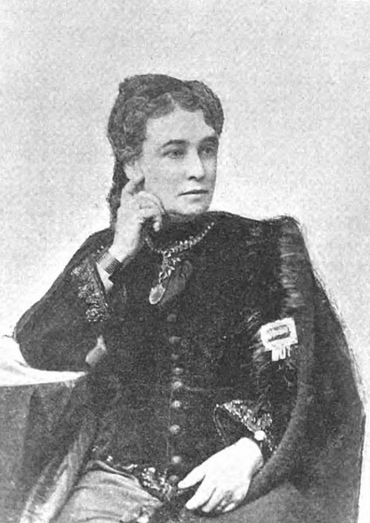
- Born: May 26, 1826 Cambridge, Massachusetts, United States
- Died: October 15, 1911 (aged 85) Cambridge, Massachusetts, United States
- Occupation: Novelist
- Spouse: Charles Wheeler Denison

Mary Andrews Denison (May 26, 1826 – October 15, 1911) was an American novelist. She wrote over eighty novels which in total sold more than one million copies. Her writing style was typical of the dime novels popular in the mid-nineteenth century, featuring sweet-natured and noble heroines who triumph over evil.

== Biography ==
Mary Ann Andrews was born in Cambridge, Massachusetts on May 26, 1826. Her family moved to Boston when she was a child, where she attended private and public schools.

In 1846, she married Charles Wheeler Denison, becoming stepmother to his daughter and two sons. Charles Denison was a clergyman and the founding editor of the first anti-slavery newspaper in New York, The Emancipator. He was also assistant editor of the Boston newspaper Olive Branch, and after meeting Charles, Mary began writing stories and sketches for that and other periodicals. She wrote her first book, Edna Etheril, the Boston Seamstress in 1847.

In 1853, she followed her husband to British Guiana where he had been appointed consul general. They moved multiple times in the 1850s and 1860s, living in Buffalo, London, and finally settling in Washington, D.C. in 1867. In the late 1850s, she served as editor of the Lady's Enterprise while continuing to write for periodicals such as Gleason's Literary Companion and Frank Leslie's Popular Monthly. During the Civil War, Charles served as a chaplain in Washington, D.C., and Mary nursed the ill and dying.

After her husband's death in 1881, Mary continued writing. In the early 1900s, she moved to Baltimore. During the last fourteen months of her life, she lived in her brother's home in Cambridge, Massachusetts. Denison died of pneumonia in Cambridge on October 15, 1911, and was buried in Lakeside Cemetery in Wakefield, Massachusetts.

== Writing ==
Denison wrote over eighty novels, which in total sold over one million copies. She wrote under several pen names, including "Clara Vance" and variations of her own name, such as the anagram "N. I. Edson" and the initials "M.A.D." and "A.M.D." In addition to novels, she wrote children's books, short stories, and plays. Denison wrote to satisfy the sentimental popular tastes of the time, which included themes of domesticity and romance. Her novels allowed readers to enjoy vivid depictions of vice along with the ultimate triumph of virtue. Most of her works had religious overtones and several of her books were published by the American Baptist Publication Society. Her most popular work, That Husband of Mine, sold 300,000 copies within its first month and was dedicated to "all who love happy homes."

== Bibliography ==
- Edna Etheril, the Boston Seamstress (1847)
- Raphael Inglesse, or, The Jew of Milan : a Thrilling Tale of the Victories of Virtue and the Punishments of Vice (1848)
- Gertrude Russel, or, Parental Example (1849)
- The Statesman's Dirge (1852)
- Home Pictures (1853)
- Nobody's Child, and Other Stories (1854)
- What Not (1855)
- Orange Leaves (1856)
- Gracie Amber (1857)
- Old Hepsy (1858)
- Opposite the Jail (1858)
- The Prisoner of La Vintresse, or, The Fortunes of a Cuban Heiress (1859)
- The Days and Ways of the Cocked Hats, or The Dawn of the Revolution (1860)
- The Young Sergeant, or, The Triumphant Soldier (1861)
- Chip, the Cave-Child (1862)
- The Master (1862)
- Stella, or, The Pathway Heavenward (1862)
- Tim Bumble's Charge, or, Mrs. Lattison's One Great Sorrow (1862)
- Bessie Brown, the Soldier's Daughter (1863)
- Lieutenant Messinger (1863)
- The Mill Agent (1863)
- The Music-Master (1863)
- Out of Prison (1864)
- The Silver Hand, or, the Mahratta Prophecy : a Story of Land and Sea (1864)
- Angel Lilly : an Incident in the Life of the Child Angel (1865)
- Jenny Boardman, or, Life in Campsie (1865)
- Linda, the Dancing Girl of the Cafe St. Nicol, and Other Tales (1865)
- The Lover's Trials, or, The Days Before the Revolution (1865)
- Led to the Light : a Sequel to Opposite the Jail (1866)
- A Noble Sister (1868)
- Andy Luttrell (1869)
- Anne's New Life (1870)
- Anne and Tilly (1871)
- Hannah's Triumph (1871)
- Silent Tom (1872)
- Among the Squirrels (1873)
- Off the Track (1873)
- Victor Norman, Rector (1873)
- John Dane (1874)
- The Little Folks of Redbow (1875)
- Rothmell (1878)
- That Husband of Mine (1877)
- Mr. Peter Crewitt (1878)
- Old Slip Warehouse (1878)
- That Wife of Mine (1878)
- Erin Go Bragh! (1879)
- No Mother Like Mine (1880)
- Florida : or, The Iron Will : a Story of Today (1882)
- Like a Gentleman (1882)
- His Triumph (1883)
- Strawberry Hill (1886)
- The Talbury Girls (1886)
- Tell Your Wife (1886)
- Barbara : a Story of Cloud and Sunshine (1887)
- Cracker Joe (1887)
- The Mad Hunter, or, The Downfall of the Le-Forests (1888)
- How She Helped Him (1889)
- Noble by Birth (1889)
- Ethel's Triumph : From Fifteen to Twenty-Five (1890)
- If She Will She Will (1891)
- Led Back (1891)
- Captain Molly : a Love Story (1894)
- The Romance of a Schoolboy (1900)
- The Adventures of Rex Staunton (1901)
- The Guardian's Trust (1902)
- The Yellow Violin (1902)
- Her Secret : a Story for Girls (1904)
