= Basil Dorsey =

African-American abolitionist

Basil Dorsey (c. 1808 – February 15, 1872) was a self-emancipated slave born in Libertytown, Maryland. He fled to Bristol, Pennsylvania, and later moved to Florence, Massachusetts, where he lived for the remainder of his life.

== Early life in Maryland ==
Basil Dorsey was born in 1808 in Libertytown of Frederick County, Maryland. He was known at the time as Ephraim Costly, and was enslaved by Sabrick Sollers. Dorsey married an enslaved woman named Louisa, and together they had two children while in Maryland, Eliza (born November 3, 1834) and John Richard (born May 18, 1836).

Dorsey had been promised freedom upon Sollers' death, but when it came on July 17, 1834, Dorsey was instead purchased by Sabrick's son, Thomas Sollers, for $300 (~$9,675 in 2025). Thomas Sollers offered to sell him his freedom for $350, but when Dorsey found Richard Cole, who agreed to be his bondsman for the sale, Sollers raised the price to $500. Cole encouraged Dorsey to escape by foot, and on May 14, 1836, he set out North with his brothers Thomas, Charles, and William. Thomas became a famous caterer in Philadelphia who had a son William Henry Dorsey who was an artist and major collector of Black history. William produced scrapbooks of articles and other materials that chronicled the lives of Black people in the 18th century.

== Escape to Pennsylvania and trial ==
The four brothers traveled to Gettysburg, then Harrisburg, then Reading, until they reached Bristol, PA, where they worked on abolitionist Robert Purvis' farm. Thomas preferred to live in the city, while Charles and William lived with neighboring farmers, and Basil lived with Purvis.

In July 1837, Dorsey's brother-in-law betrayed him to slave-hunters hired by Thomas Sollers, and they tracked him to Purvis' farm and had him seized by local authorities. Upon learning about Dorsey's imprisonment, Robert Purvis organized an escape to New Jersey for William and Charles, to prevent them from being recaptured as well. From New Jersey, they would travel to freedom in Canada. Thomas had also been captured by the slave-hunters, and he was sent back into slavery in Maryland. Friends in Philadelphia quickly raised $1000, with which they bought his freedom. He returned to Philadelphia and lived there for the rest of his life as a popular caterer.

Purvis brought lawyer Thomas Ross and Dorsey's wife and children, who had recently come to Pennsylvania, to the court in Doylestown. They urged the judge, Judge Fox, to postpone the case, claiming that Dorsey had free papers currently being held by a friend in Columbia, PA. Fox agreed to postpone the trial by two weeks. Purvis also believed the judge felt sympathy for Dorsey, as he recalled in an 1883 account:

"Doubtless the judge was deeply impressed by the appearance in the court-room of the delicate and beautiful wife and the young children clinging to the husband and father, who, looking the picture of despair sat with the evidence in his torn and soiled garments of the terrible conflict through which he had passed.”

During those two weeks, Basil Dorsey remained in a jail cell, and Robert Purvis organized his legal support. He drove to Philadelphia and enlisted the service of renowned lawyer and philanthropist David Paul Brown, who refused to accept any payment for defending Dorsey. Purvis spread the word about the trial, encouraging the local African-American population to show up to his trial and aid Dorsey if the ruling was in favor of Sollers.

During the trial, Sollers offered to settle the case by offering Dorsey for sale for $500. When Purvis agreed to pay that amount, he raised it to $800. When Purvis agreed again, he raised it to $1000. Dorsey interrupted and declared, "Do not pay it. I am prepared to take my life in court, if the case goes against me, for I will never go back to slavery."

Abel M. Griffith, a young lawyer, represented Thomas Sollers. He presented documents that proved Sollers' ownership of Dorsey, and he argued the legality of Sollers' right to recapture him. According to Purvis' account, it seemed all likely that the court would rule in favor of the prosecution. David Paul Brown then rose and demanded that Griffith produce proper evidence that slavery is legal in the state of Maryland. Griffith left the courthouse and returned with The Laws of Maryland, which Brown declared was not a certified copy. Griffith pleaded with the judge to offer him more time to find proof, but Judge Fox dismissed the case.

Purvis immediately brought Dorsey to his mother's home in Philadelphia, and shortly after they traveled to New York in search of greater security.

== New York and Charlemont, MA ==
Once in New York, he met The Emancipator editor Joshua Leavitt and David Ruggles, who encouraged him to go to Northampton, MA, where he stayed with Haynes K. Starkweather for a few days. Colonel Samuel Parsons then brought him to Charlemont, MA, to the farm of Roger Hooker Leavitt, father of Joshua Leavitt. Dorsey lived on Leavitt's property for about six years. During that time, he and Louisa had a third child, Charles Robert, on August 29, 1838. Louisa died two months later, on November 7, and she was buried in the town's cemetery.

== Florence and Northampton, MA ==
In January 1844, Dorsey moved with his children to Florence (then called Bensonville) and began working at the Bensonville Manufacturing Company, run by George W. Benson, founder of the Northampton Association of Education and Industry, and a brother-in-law of William Lloyd Garrison.

On November 12, 1849, Dorsey bought lot No. 12 of the Bensonville Village Lots for $35. He built a home on the land, which was purchased by Mary Jones in 1852. The Dorsey–Jones House is now considered a historic site.

Dorsey was a "teamster", or a driver at the cotton mill, then general "jobber." His job as a teamster meant a lot of traveling, which suddenly became dangerous after The Fugitive Slave Act was enacted in 1850, as he frequently made visits to Boston and Providence which had a higher chance of slave catchers.

A month after it was enacted, Dorsey and 9 other fugitives publicly called out to locals to help them resist any attempts to return them to the South. He and many of his friends were strongly against paying for his natural right to freedom, but with the passage of the act, Dorsey was in significantly higher danger while doing his job. His friends in Northampton and Florence then gathered $150, and with $50 of Dorsey's own earnings he officially bought his freedom which settled on May 14, 1851, fifteen years after his escape. The bill of sale was registered to George Griscom, a Philadelphia lawyer, who then manumitted Dorsey.

Basil Dorsey remarried to a woman named Cynthia, with whom he had 11 children. He died in Florence on February 15, 1872.
