= John Hooker Leavitt =

American banker and politician (1831–1906)

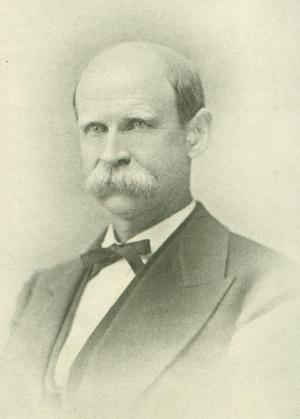
- Leavitt, c. 1871

Member of the Iowa Senate from the 38th district
- In office January 8, 1872 – January 14, 1874
- Preceded by: George William Couch
- Succeeded by: John Conaway

Personal details
- Born: October 11, 1831 Heath, Massachusetts, U.S.
- Died: September 25, 1906 (aged 74) Waterloo, Iowa, U.S.
- Party: Republican
- Spouse: Caroline Ware (m. 1858)
- Children: 5
- Parent: Roger Hooker Leavitt (father)
- Relatives: Joshua Leavitt (uncle); Hart Leavitt (uncle)
- Occupation: Banker; politician

John Hooker Leavitt (October 11, 1831 – September 25, 1906) was an American banker and politician who was a member of the Iowa Senate for the 38th district from 1872 to 1874. Born at Heath, Massachusetts, he later moved westward to Iowa in search of fortune.

== Biography ==
John Hooker Leavitt was the son of Col. Roger Hooker Leavitt, a businessman, politician and Massachusetts abolitionist. Young Leavitt studied civil engineering, and early in his career was contracted by John Roebling, the builder of the Brooklyn Bridge, to survey a large tract of land. Having gained some measure of confidence in his abilities, Leavitt struck out for the west in 1854, reaching Dubuque, Iowa, where he remained for less than a year before settling at Waterloo, Iowa.

While in Dubuque, Leavitt married Caroline Clark Ware of Granville, Illinois. Shortly after his move to Waterloo, the young engineer decided on a change of career, and became a banker. Within a decade he founded his own private banking firm.

Several years later, on the admission of a new partner, the sole proprietorship of Leavitt's bank necessitated a change of name to Leavitt & Lusch. Subsequently, on the addition of another partner, the bank became known as Leavitt, Johnson & Lusch. On the retirement of partner A. T. Lusch, the business became known as Leavitt & Johnson Bank, under which name the firm operated from 1876 to 1898, when the firm was reorganized as Leavitt & Johnson National Bank, with a capital stock of $100,000.

John Hooker Leavitt worked at the firm for 50 years, during the various permutations of the corporation's name. He served as president of the institution, located at Commercial and Fourth Streets in downtown Waterloo, until 1901.

In 1871, Leavitt was elected to the Iowa Senate, where he was engaged in the fight to prevent the return of James Harlan to the United States Senate after his service as a member of Abraham Lincoln's cabinet. A staunch Republican, Leavitt served only one term in the Iowa State Senate.

After leaving the state senate, Leavitt devoted his time to his business affairs, as well as his membership in the Congregational Church of Waterloo. He was an early benefactor of Talladega College, Alabama's oldest historically black college, and in 1903 he joined the Pocumtuck Valley Memorial Association in Deerfield, Massachusetts, where his father Roger Hooker Leavitt had served as vice president.

John H. Leavitt's brother William also lived in Waterloo, but eventually relocated to Minneapolis, Minnesota. Hon. John Hooker Leavitt and his wife had five children: Roger of Cedar Falls, Iowa; Joseph, who lived in Illinois; Mary Leavitt Davison, wife of Robert A. Davison; Lucy O. Leavitt; and Grace, who married Thomas Cascaden Jr.

John H. Leavitt's father, abolitionist Roger Hooker Leavitt, died in Waterloo in 1885 while on a visit to his son. Col. Roger Hooker Leavitt's body was returned to Charlemont, Massachusetts, longtime home of the family, for burial. John Hooker Leavitt died at Waterloo in 1906.

== See also ==
- Roger Hooker Leavitt
