= Horace Hooker =

American writer

Horace Hooker (March 1793 – December 17, 1864) was an American Congregationalist minister and author.

== Biography ==
He was the son of Elijah and Susanna (Seymour) Hooker, and was born in Kensington Society, Berlin, Connecticut. He was a descendant of Rev. Thomas Hooker, first minister of Hartford, Connecticut He fitted for college under the direction of Rev. Joab Brace, D. D., at Newington, Connecticut and graduated from Yale College in 1815. After graduating, he was for about two years Principal of the Hartford Grammar School, from which he was called to be Tutor in Yale College, which office he held from 1817 to 1822. During this time he studied theology and was licensed to preach the gospel.

In the year 1822, he was ordained as pastor of the Congregational Church in Watertown, Connecticut, where he remained about two years, being then compelled to resign his pastorate on account of ill-health. In 1824 he returned to Hartford and became editor of the Connecticut Observer, a religious newspaper. He also held the office of Secretary of the Missionary Society of Connecticut, from 1826, and of the Connecticut Home Missionary Society, from 1831 till his death.

In 1852, he was appointed Chaplain of the Retreat for the Insane, performing the duties of that office until incapacitated by an attack of paralysis in August 1862. For several years previous to 1855, he spent his leisure time in the preparation of books for children. Among these were Child's Book on the Sabbath, The Farmer, Prophets and Prophecy, and four volumes of Scripture Biography. In connection with Thomas Hopkins Gallaudet, he prepared The Practical Spelling Book, and The School and Family Dictionary, and continued Gallaudet's series, Scripture Biographies for Children. With the assistance of Rev. Dr. Daggett, he selected and arranged the Hymns and Psalms, as set forth by the General Association of Connecticut, in use for twenty years past in most of the Congregational Churches in this State. Mr. Hooker was a clear thinker, and expressed his thoughtfulness in a style remarkable for its neatness and perspicuity.

He married, July 17, 1822, Mary Ann Brown, who died May 3, 1838, without children. He married Harriet Watkinson, November 22, 1843, who survived him. He died in Hartford, December 17, 1864, aged 71 years. He left a son, Thomas, and a daughter.
