= Jonathan Leavitt =

American politician (1764–1830)

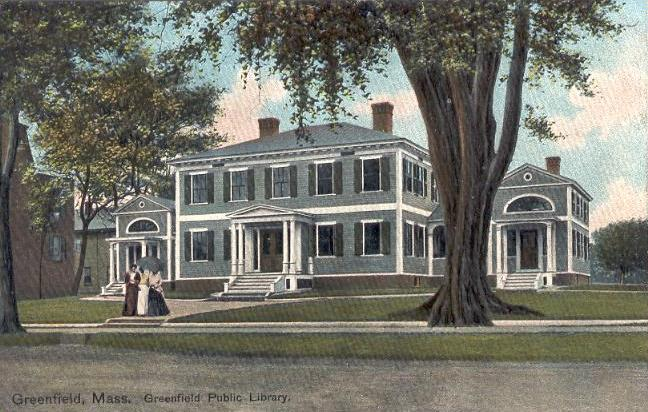
Jonathan Leavitt House, later Leavitt-Hovey House, Greenfield, Massachusetts

Jonathan Leavitt (1764–1830) was a Greenfield, Massachusetts attorney, judge, state senator and businessman for whom the architect Asher Benjamin designed the Leavitt House, now the Leavitt-Hovey House on Main Street, in 1797.

Leavitt was born in Walpole, New Hampshire, but was raised in Greenfield, where his father Rev. Jonathan Leavitt served as a Congregational minister. Leavitt attended Yale College, taught school in New Haven, and then achieved early prominence as a lawyer in Greenfield. He subsequently served as chief justice of the Court of Common Pleas in 1812, and Judge of Probate from 1814 to 1821. Leavitt used the west wing of the Leavitt-Hovey house for his business activities. He was a founder and first president of The Franklin Bank of Greenfield in 1822.

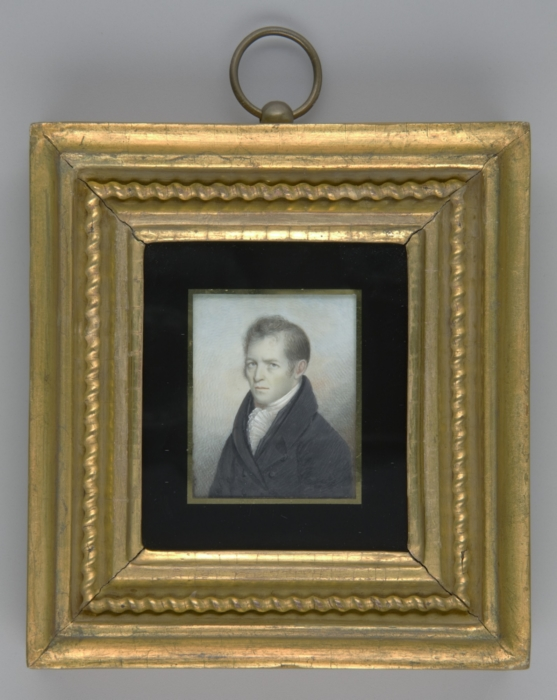
Miniature of Jonathan Leavitt, painted ca. 1812, Yale University Art Gallery

Leavitt was also known for his legal writings, especially in probate law, as well as his "Summary of the Laws of Massachusetts, Relative to the Settlement, Support, Employment and Removal of Paupers", published in Greenfield in 1810. He also published two small volumes on religion.

Leavitt married Emelia Stiles, daughter of President Ezra Stiles of Yale College, for whom today's Ezra Stiles College at Yale is named. Rev. Jonathan Leavitt, Leavitt's father, was also a graduate of Yale and a native of Suffield, Connecticut. Rev. Leavitt's wife was Sarah Hooker, great-great-granddaughter of the Rev. Thomas Hooker, New England divine and chief founder of the Colony of Connecticut.

Members of the Leavitt family became prominent in nearby Charlemont and Heath, and were noted for their abolitionist activities. (Rev. Joshua Leavitt, born in nearby Heath, Massachusetts, was a member of this family.) Leavitt's household had three African-American servants, and on the death of her father Ezra Stiles Mrs. Leavitt inherited her father's two elderly slaves Newport and his wife Nabby.

Leavitt died in Greenfield in 1830. He and the former Emelia Stiles had four daughters, including Sarah Hooker Leavitt, Mary Hooker Leavitt, Emilia Stiles Leavitt (later Mrs. E. T. Foote), and a son Jonathan, who died in 1821 while attending Yale College, an event that threw his father into profound depression. In 1822 his sister compiled a memoir devoted to her brother entitled "Memoir of Jonathan Leavitt, a Member of the Junior Class in Yale College, who Died at New-Haven the 10th of May, 1821, Aged 18 Years." The book, whose author was described as "a sister", was published by S. Converse in New Haven in 1822.

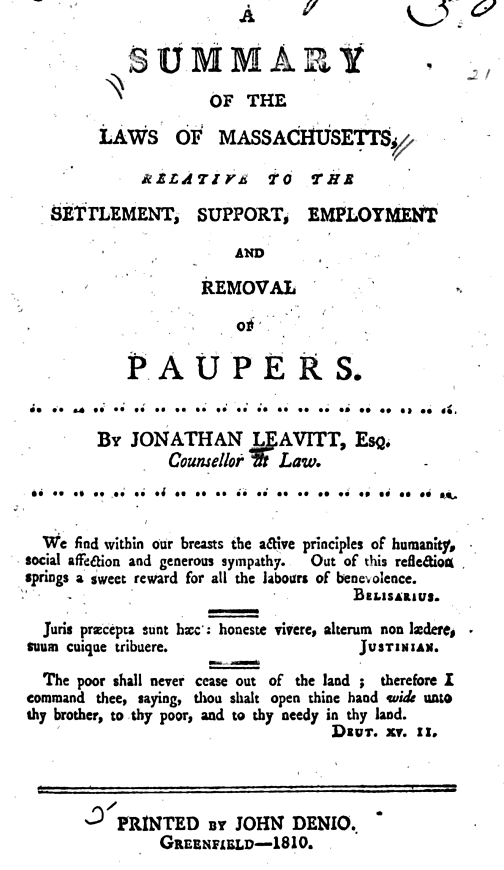
A Summary of the Laws of Massachusetts, Jonathan Leavitt, Esq., Greenfield, 1810

== See also ==
- Jonathan Leavitt (minister)
- Leavitt-Hovey House
