= Roger Hooker Leavitt =

American industrialist and politician (1805–1885)

Colonel Roger Hooker Leavitt
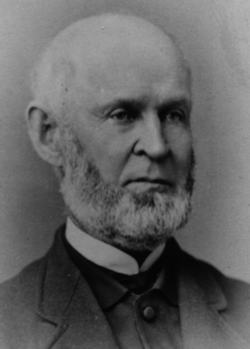
- Photograph, c. 1880–1882
- Born: July 21, 1805; Heath, Massachusetts, U.S.
- Died: July 17, 1885 (aged 79); Waterloo, Iowa, U.S.
- Occupations: Industrialist; landowner; militia officer; politician
- Spouses: Keziah Hunt (m. 1829; died 1838) Eliza Hunt (m. 1839)
- Children: 3, including John Hooker
- Relatives: Joshua Leavitt (brother); Hart Leavitt (brother)
- Military career
- Branch: Massachusetts National Guard
- Rank: Colonel

Col. Roger Hooker Leavitt (July 21, 1805 – July 17, 1885) was an Americsn industrialist, landowner, militia officer, and Massachusetts politician who with other family members was an ardent abolitionist, using his home in Charlemont, Massachusetts as an Underground Railroad station for slaves escaped from the South. The escaped slave Basil Dorsey lived in Leavitt's home for nearly six years until eventually settling in Florence, Massachusetts.

== Biography ==
Roger Hooker Leavitt was born in Heath, Massachusetts, on July 21, 1805, the son of wealthy landowner Roger Leavitt and his wife Chloe (née Maxwell). Leavitt's father served in the state's legislature, was an active businessman, and later an ardent abolitionist. The elder Roger's brother was Judge and State Senator Jonathan Leavitt of nearby Greenfield. Roger's son Roger Hooker Leavitt, a graduate of Hopkins Academy in nearby Hadley, and briefly a student at Dartmouth College also served in the Massachusetts Senate.

Col. Leavitt apparently came naturally to the abolitionist cause. His father had worked against slavery and his brother Joshua had, after graduating from Yale Law School and Yale Divinity School, become a social reformer, leading campaigns for temperance and against slavery. Joshua later became the editor of the abolitionist newspaper The Emancipator, was a prime force behind the defense of the crew of the Amistad, a slave ship that had sustained a mutiny aboard, and in 1833 founded the New York Anti-Slavery Society.

In October 1835, Col. Roger Hooker Leavitt joined his brothers Joshua and Hart in attending the Utica, New York, state convention of the Utica Anti-Slavery Society. Violence by pro-slavery factions marred the gathering, but the fracas enabled the three brothers to fully convert their parents to the abolitionist cause. By the following year, Col. Leavitt was president of the Franklin County Anti-Slavery Society as well as vice-president of the Massachusetts Anti-Slavery Society in 1838–39. In that year, Col. Leavitt's father moved from his home in Heath to Charlemont, where his sons lived, and agreed to run for Lieutenant Governor of Massachusetts on the Liberty Party ticket, a political party which his son Joshua had helped found.

Col. Leavitt was best known for his sheltering of the fugitive slave Basil Dorsey, who escaped from Frederick County, Maryland unassisted in 1836. By that time, apparently, Col. Hooker's home had become known to anti-slavery zealots as a safe place to shelter escaped slaves. "It was always understood that a resting place was at Mr. [Hosea] Blake's and Mr. Leavitt's," a resident recounted years later of the men operating the local Underground Railroad. "This was carried on with the greatest secrecy, because of the personal danger, not only to the slave but to those who harbored them."

In 1836, shortly after Dorsey's successful escape, Rev. Joshua Leavitt, living in New York City, helped Dorsey and his wife find refuge in Massachusetts – at the home of Joshua's brother Roger Hooker Leavitt. Charlemont records subsequently reflect the birth of Dorsey's son Charles Robert Dorsey in 1838 at Charlemont, as well as the presence in town of two of Dorsey's children born earlier in Maryland. Census records for 1840 show no persons of color living in the households of any of the Leavitt family – at the homes of father Roger, brother Hart nor at Col. Roger Hooker's – but records of the Massachusetts Anti-Slavery Society clearly show that 'B. Dorsey' of Charlemont contributed 50 cents to the cause in 1839.

Shortly after his arrival in Charlemont, Dorsey's first wife died, in the same year as Roger Hooker's first wife Kezeah Osgood Hunt Leavitt. On learning the news of the death of Dorsey's wife, Joshua Leavitt wrote his brother Roger Hooker: "I feel for Mr. Dorsey in his bereavement and trust that you will do all that Christian benevolence requires in his care."

It was probably open knowledge in some parts of the community that the Leavitts were harboring fugitive slaves, but it seems that many like-minded citizens cooperated with the Leavitts and others who were sheltering the fugitives. As late as 1895, nearly thirty years after the Civil War, a Franklin County woman called Leavitt "a whole souled Abolitionist & [someone who] did all he could to help the slaves to freedom." At the same time, she averred that she could not furnish any specific details.

By 1844, Basil Dorsey moved on to other housing, likely in Florence, Massachusetts. He had spent over five years under the roof of the Leavitt family, either at Col. Roger Hooker's home, the adjoining farm of his brother Hart, or at the home of the patriarch Roger – and probably at all three places. Contemporary accounts show that the family was aiding other escaped slaves during this period.

Col. Leavitt died in Waterloo, Iowa, on July 17, 1885, four days before his 80th birthday, where he was visiting his son John Hooker Leavitt. In its obituary, The New York Times noted Leavitt's abolitionist activities and called him "one of the prominent and leading citizens of Franklin County."

The correspondence of Joshua Leavitt, his brothers Col. Roger Hooker and Hart, and that of his father Roger, from the years 1812–71, is deposited at the Library of Congress Manuscript Division in Washington, D.C.. The home of Col. Roger Hooker is now part of the campus of the Academy at Charlemont, and is included on the National Park Service's National Underground Railroad Network to Freedom. On the Network to Freedom, as well, is the former Charlemont home of Col. Leavitt's brother Hart and his wife Mary.

== See also ==
- 1868 Massachusetts legislature
- Joshua Leavitt
- Hart Leavitt
- John Hooker Leavitt
- Thomas Hooker
