= Charles Wheeler Denison =

American cleric, author and newspaper editor

- Born: November 11, 1809; New London
- Died: November 1881
- Occupations: Writer, newspaper editor, cleric, abolitionist, consul
- Spouse: Mary Andrews Denison

Charles Wheeler Denison (November 11, 1809, New London, Connecticut – November 14, 1881) was an American cleric, author and newspaper editor.

== Life ==
Before he was of age he edited a newspaper in his native town. He afterward became a clergyman, edited The Emancipator – the first antislavery journal published in New York – and took part in other similar publications. In 1853 he was U.S. consul in British Guiana. He spent some time among the operatives of Lancashire, England speaking in behalf of the National cause during the American civil war, and in 1867 edited an American paper in London, being at the same time pastor of Grove Road chapel, Victoria Park, London. During the last two years of the war he served as post chaplain in Winchester, Virginia, and as hospital chaplain in Washington.

He published "The American Village and other Poems" (Boston, 1845); "Paul St. Clair", a temperance story; "Out at Sea", poems (London, 1867); "Antonio, the Italian Boy" (Boston, 1873); "The Child Hunters", relating to the abuses of the pardon system (Philadelphia, 1877); and a series of biographies published during the war, including "The Tanner Boy" (Grant); "The Bobbin Boy" (Banks); and "Winfield, the Lawyer's Son" (Hancock).

His wife, Mary Andrews, author, born in Cambridge, Massachusetts, May 26, 1826, became connected, on her marriage to Denison, with the Olive Branch, of which he was assistant editor. She continued to contribute to magazines, and, when living in British Guiana, wrote tropical sketches for American periodicals. She also contributed to English magazines while in London. Her books are mostly tales of home life, and include "Home Pictures", a collection of sketches written for periodicals (New York, 1853); "Gracie Amber" (1857); "Old Hepsey, a Tale of the South" (1858); "Opposite the Jail" (1858); "The Lovers' Trials" (Philadelphia, 1865); "Annie and Teely" (1869); "That Husband of Mine," an anonymous book, which reached a sale of over 200,000 copies in a few weeks (Boston, 1874); "That Wife of Mine" (1877); "Rothmell" (1878); "Mr. Peter Crewett" (1878); "His Triumph" (1883); "What One Boy can Do" (1885); and numerous Sunday school books.
