= Dorsey-Palmer House =

Historic house in Maryland, United States

- U.S. National Register of Historic Places
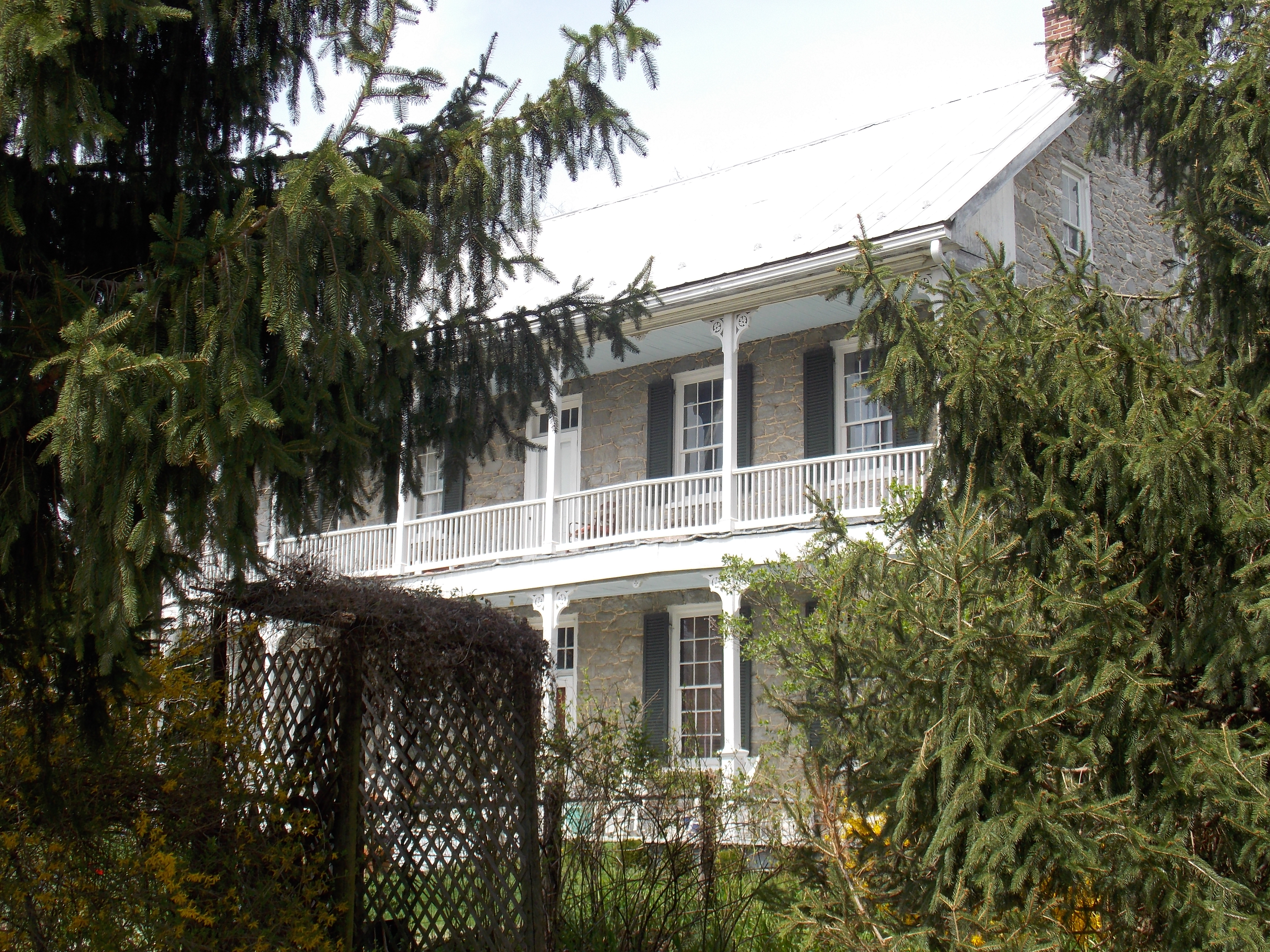

- Location within Maryland Location within the United States
- Nearest city: Hagerstown, Maryland
- Coordinates: 39°40′41″N 77°41′2″W
- Area: 2.5 acres (1.0 ha)
- Built: c. 1800
- Architectural style: Georgian
- NRHP reference No.: 78001479
- Added to NRHP: April 15, 1978

The Dorsey-Palmer House is a historic home located near Hagerstown, Washington County, Maryland, United States. It was built about 1800, and is a two-story, five-bay fieldstone dwelling with a two-story, four-bay rear wing. The house features a double porch extending across the front elevation and large transoms over entrances on the front.

The Dorsey-Palmer House was listed on the National Register of Historic Places in 1978.
