= Thomas A. Dorsey Farmhouse =

- U.S. National Register of Historic Places
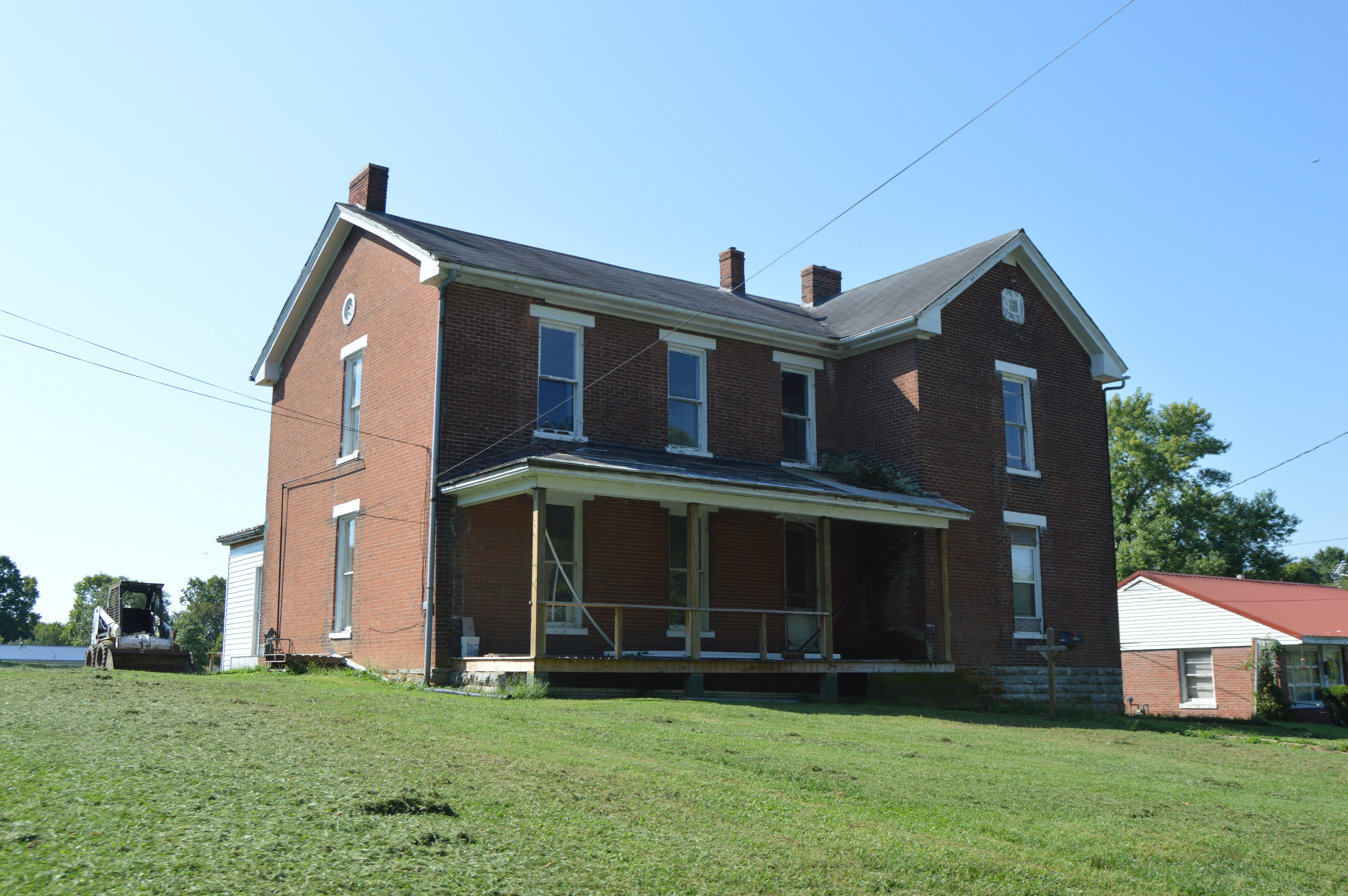

- Location within Kentucky Location within the United States
- Location: 416 High St., Carlisle, Kentucky
- Coordinates: 38°18′37″N 84°01′22″W
- Area: less than one acre
- Built: 1855
- NRHP reference No.: 89001603
- Added to NRHP: September 28, 1989

The Thomas A. Dorsey Farmhouse, at 416 High St. in Carlisle, Kentucky, was listed on the National Register of Historic Places in 1989.

It is a large two-story red brick Italianate T-plan house. It is located in the "Dorsey's Addition" neighborhood, and it prominently overlooks East Main Street, which is two streets below.
