= Thomas Hooker =

English religious and colonial leader (1586–1647)

The Reverend Thomas Hooker
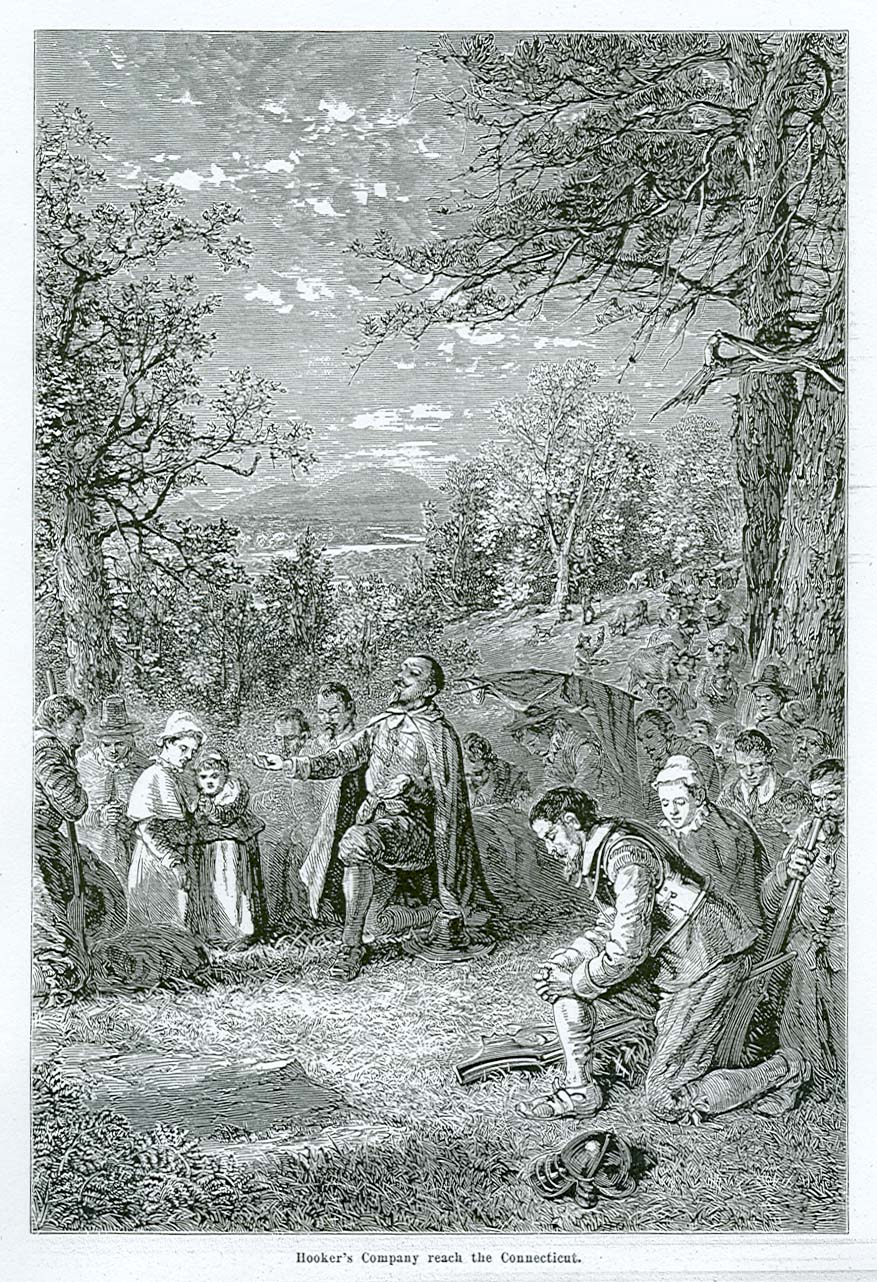
- Hooker's Company reach the Connecticut, publishers: Estes & Lauriat, 1879
- Born: July 5, 1586; Marefield or Birstall, Leicestershire
- Died: July 7, 1647 (aged 61); Hartford, Connecticut Colony, British America
- Occupation: Congregational minister
- Known for: Helped found the Connecticut Colony and write one of the first written constitutions along with a bill of rights.
- Spouse: Susanna (possibly née Garbrand) Hooker (2nd wife) The name of his first wife is not known
- Children: 6

Thomas Hooker (July 5, 1586 – July 7, 1647) was a prominent English colonial leader and Congregational minister, who founded the Connecticut Colony after dissenting with Puritan leaders in Massachusetts. He was known as an outstanding speaker and an advocate of universal Christian suffrage.

Called today "the Father of Connecticut", Hooker was a towering figure in the early development of colonial New England. He was one of the great preachers of his time, an erudite writer on Christian subjects, the first minister of Cambridge, Massachusetts, and one of the first settlers and founders of both the city of Hartford and the state of Connecticut. He has been cited by many as the inspiration for the "Fundamental Orders of Connecticut", which some have described as the world's first written democratic constitution establishing a representative government.

== Life ==
Cuckoos Farm, Little Baddow, Essex, Hooker's home around 1629

=== Early life ===
Thomas Hooker was likely born in Leicestershire at "Marfield" (Marefield or possibly Markfield) or Birstall. He went to Dixie Grammar School at Market Bosworth. Family genealogist Edward Hooker linked Thomas Hooker to the Hooker family in Devon, which produced the theologian and clergyman Richard Hooker. Other Hooker genealogists, however, have traced Thomas Hooker to Leicestershire. Positive evidence linking Thomas to Leicestershire is lacking since the Marefield parish records from before 1610 were lost. Any link to the Rev. Richard Hooker is likewise lacking since the Rev. Thomas's personal papers were disposed of and his house destroyed after his death.

=== College ===
In March 1604, Hooker entered Queens' College, Cambridge as a sizar but migrated to Emmanuel College. He received his Bachelor of Arts in 1608 and his Master of Arts in 1611. In 1609 he was elected to a Dixie fellowship at Emmanuel, a position he held until 1619.

Hooker was appointed to St George's Church, Esher, Surrey in 1620, where he earned a reputation as an excellent speaker. He also became noted for his pastoral care of Mrs. Joan Drake, the wife of the patron. She was a depressive whose stages of spiritual regeneration became a model for his later theological thinking. While associated with the Drake household, he married Susannah Garbrand, Mrs. Drake's woman-in-waiting (April 3, 1621) in Amersham, Mrs. Drake's birthplace.

Around 1626, Hooker became a lecturer or preacher at what was then St. Mary's parish church, Chelmsford (now Chelmsford Cathedral) and curate to its rector, John Michaelson. In 1629 Archbishop William Laud suppressed church lecturers, and Hooker retired to Little Baddow where he kept a school.

His leadership of Puritan sympathizers brought him a summons to the Court of High Commission. Forfeiting his bond, Hooker fled to Rotterdam in the Netherlands, and considered a position in the English Reformed Church, Amsterdam, as assistant to its senior pastor, the Rev. John Paget. From the Netherlands, after a clandestine trip to England to put his affairs in order, he immigrated to the Massachusetts Bay Colony aboard the Griffin.

Hooker arrived in Boston and settled in Newtown (later renamed Cambridge), where he became the pastor of the earliest established church there, known to its members as "The Church of Christ at Cambridge". His congregation, some of whom may have been members of congregations he had served in England, became known as "Mr. Hooker's Company". For a time he lived in Watertown, Massachusetts, but felt that the towns were too close together. When the General Court of Massachusetts allowed residents to split off and found new communities, his group was among the first to go.

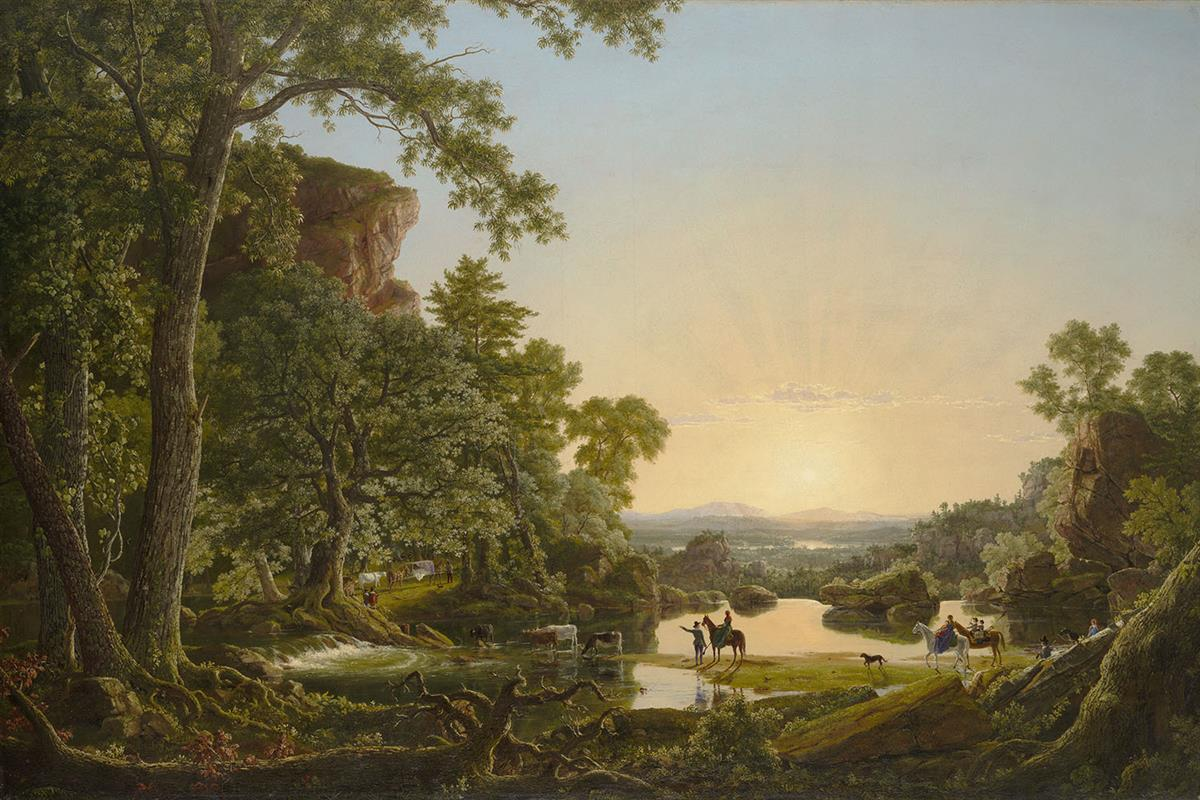
Hooker and Company Journeying through the Wilderness from Plymouth to Hartford, in 1636, Frederic Edwin Church, 1846

Voting in Massachusetts was limited to freemen, individuals who had been formally admitted to their church after a detailed interrogation of their religious views and experiences. Hooker disagreed with this limitation of suffrage, putting him at odds with his old friend, the influential pastor John Cotton.

Owing to his conflict with Cotton, discontented with the suppression of Puritan suffrage, and at odds with the colony leadership, Hooker and the Rev. Samuel Stone led a group of about 100 who, in 1636, founded the settlement of Hartford. It was named for Stone's birthplace, Hertford in England.

They founded the Connecticut Colony. Hooker became more active in politics in Connecticut. The General Court representing Wethersfield, Windsor and Hartford met at the end of May 1638 to frame a written constitution in order to establish a government for the commonwealth. Hooker preached the opening sermon at First Church of Hartford on May 31, declaring that "the foundation of authority is laid in the free consent of the people."

On January 14, 1639, freemen from these three settlements ratified the "Fundamental Orders of Connecticut" in what John Fiske called "the first written constitution known to history that created a government. It marked the beginnings of American democracy, of which Thomas Hooker deserves more than any other man to be called the father. The government of the United States today is in lineal descent more nearly related to that of Connecticut than to that of any of the other thirteen colonies."

In recognition of this, near Chelmsford Cathedral, Essex, England, where Hooker had been town lecturer and curate, there is a blue plaque fixed high on the wall of a narrow alleyway, opposite the south porch, that reads: "Thomas Hooker, 1586–1647, Curate at St. Mary's Church and Chelmsford Town Lecturer 1626–29. Founder of the State of Connecticut, Father of American Democracy."

== Death and legacy ==
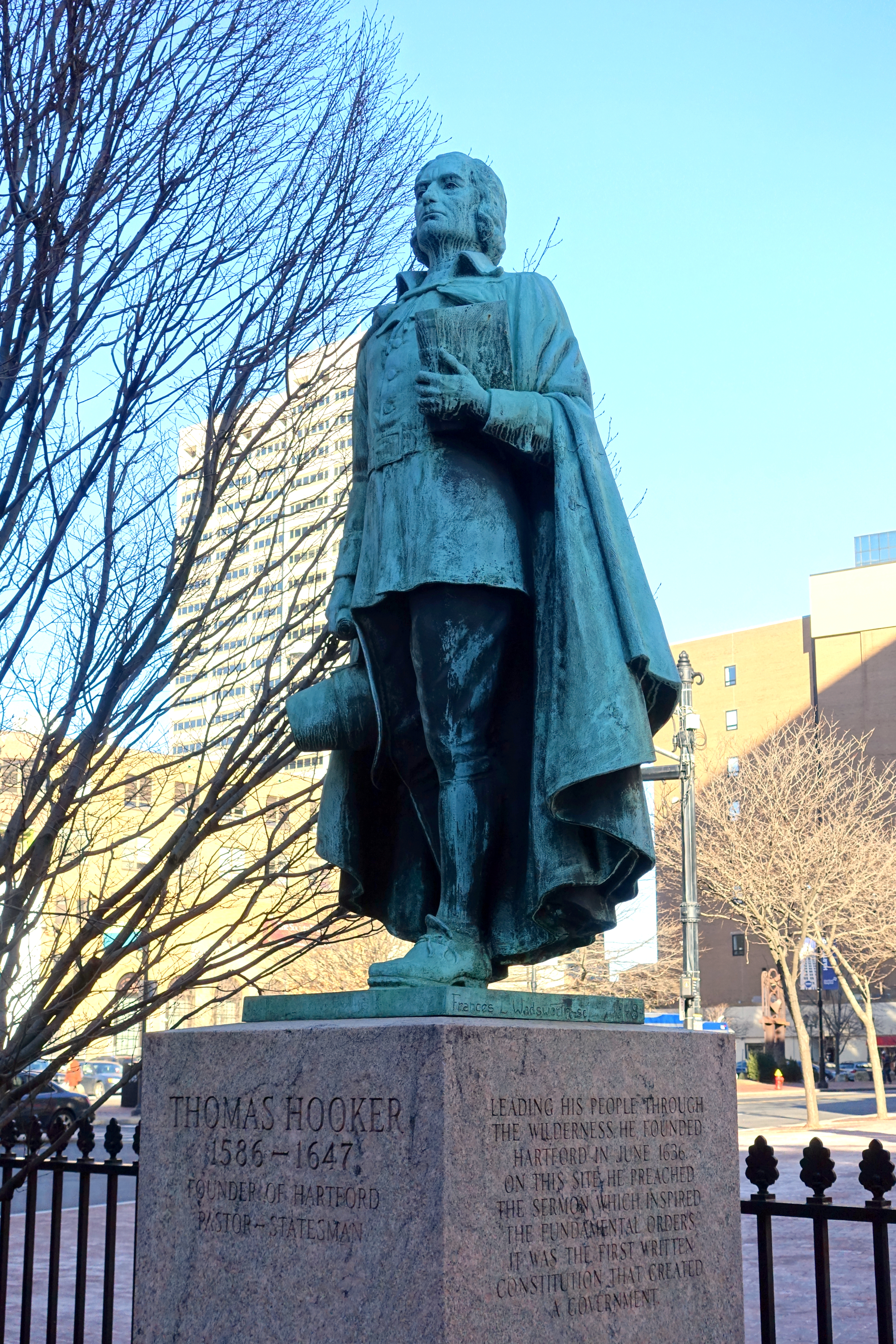
Hooker's statue by Frances Laughlin Wadsworth

Hooker died during the 1647 North American influenza epidemic on July 7, at the age of 61, two days after his birthday. The location of his grave is unknown, although he is believed to be buried in Hartford's Ancient Burying Ground. A crypt was erected there; in addition a plaque on the back of the First Church refers to his burial.

Because there was no known portrait of him, in the 20th century Frances Laughlin Wadsworth used the likenesses of his descendants to sculpt the commissioned statue of Hooker that was erected in 1938 in front of Hartford's Old State House.

== Views ==
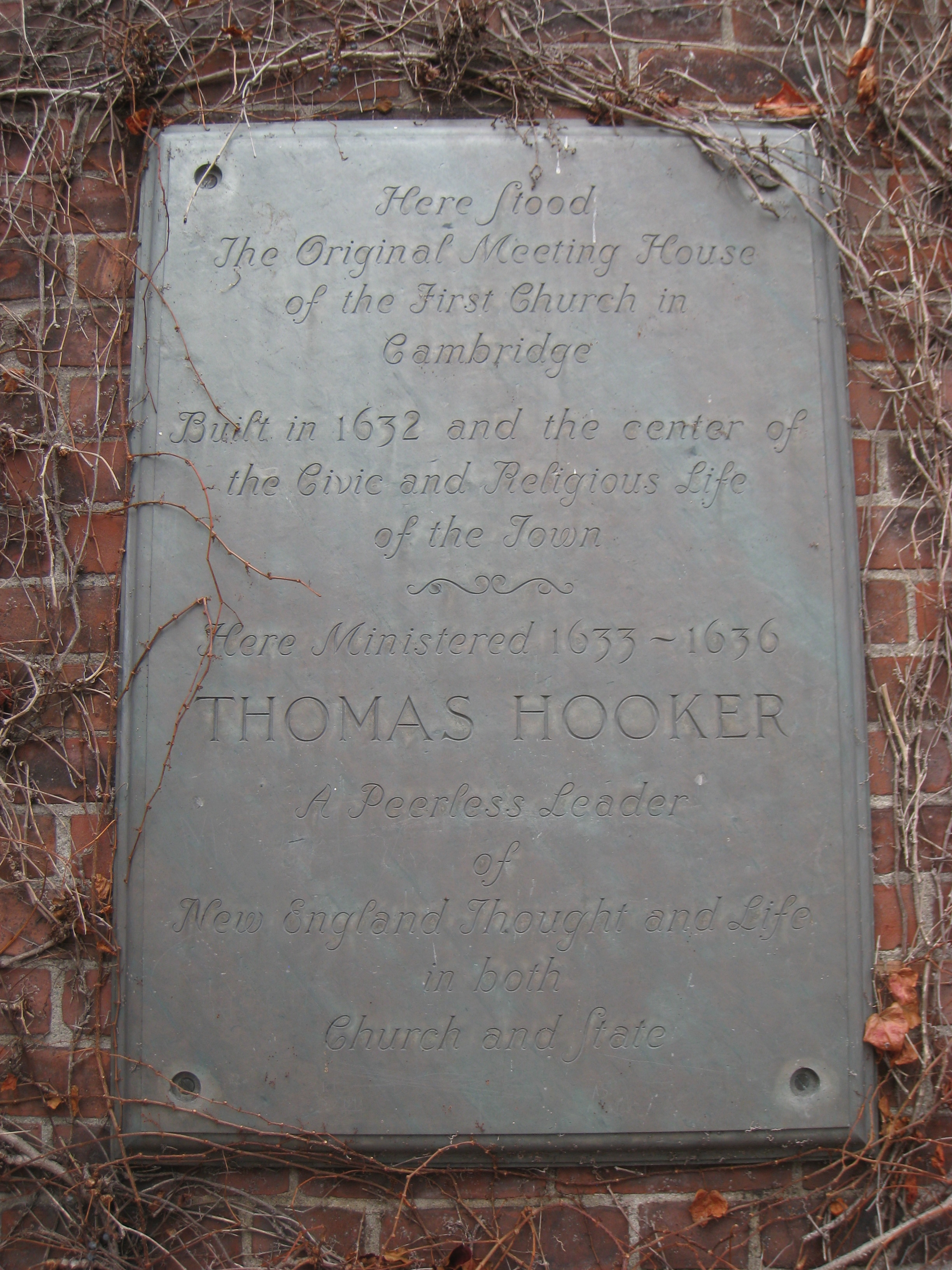
Plaque honoring Hooker's ministry at the First Church of Cambridge, Cambridge, Massachusetts

Thomas Hooker strongly advocated extended suffrage to include Puritan worshippers, leading him and his followers to colonize Connecticut. He also promoted the concept of a government that must answer to the people, stating: "[T]hey who have the power to appoint officers and magistrates, it is in their power, also, to set the bounds and limitations of the power and place unto which they call them" through "the privilege of election, which belongs to the people according to the blessed will and law of God". Hooker argued for greater religious tolerance towards all Christian denominations.

Hooker defended the calling of synods by magistrates, and attended a convention of ministers in Boston whose purpose was to defend Congregationalism. Hooker later published A Survey of the Summed of Church-Discipline in defense of Congregationalism, and applied its principles to politics and government.

Thomas Hooker was a prominent proponent of the doctrine of preparationism, which taught that by making use of the means of grace, a "person seeking conversion might dispose himself toward receiving God's grace." He believed that much of God's favor needed to be re-earned by men. To Hooker, sin was the most crafty of enemies, defeating grace on most occasions. He disagreed with many of the predecessor theologies of Free Grace theology, preferring a more muted view on the subject. He focused on preparation for heaven and following the moralist character.

== Family ==
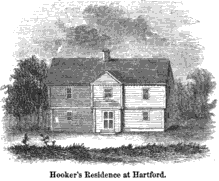
House of Thomas Hooker, Hartford, Connecticut

Coat of Arms of Thomas Hooker

Thomas Hooker came to the colonies with his second wife, Suzanne. Nothing is known of his first wife.

His son Samuel, likely born at Cambridge, Massachusetts, graduated from Harvard College in 1653. He became minister of Farmington, Connecticut, where his descendants lived for many generations. (Note: Married to the eldest daughter of Capt. Thomas Willett of Plymouth Colony, a Plymouth merchant and later first mayor of New York City, Rev. Samuel Hooker was the progenitor of all Hookers who claim descent from Rev. Thomas Hooker of Connecticut.) Of Rev. Samuel Hooker, Cotton Mather wrote in Magnalia Christi Americana: "Thus we have to this day among us our dead Hooker, yet living in his worthy son Samuel Hooker, an able, faithful, useful minister at Farmington, in the Colony of Connecticut."

His daughter Mary married Rev. Roger Newton, who was a founder and first minister of Farmington, Connecticut. Newton later was called as minister in Milford, Connecticut.

His grandchildren also had prominent lives. John Hooker, son of Rev. Samuel and grandson of Rev. Thomas, served as Speaker of the Connecticut Assembly, and previously as Judge of the state supreme court. James Hooker, brother of John and son of Rev. Samuel, also became a prominent political figure in Connecticut. He married the daughter of William Leete of Guilford, Connecticut, and subsequently settled there. James Hooker served as the first probate judge, and later as speaker of the Connecticut colonial assembly. Rev. Thomas's granddaughter Mary Hooker, the daughter of Rev. Samuel, married the Rev. James Pierpont. Their daughter Sarah Pierpont married the Rev. Jonathan Edwards.

Other descendants of Thomas Hooker include Henry Hooker, John Hooker, Arthur Atterbury, Charles Atterbury Mary Hooker Pierpont, William Howard Taft, Timothy Dwight V, Aaron Burr, William Gillette, William Huntington Russell, Edward H. Gillette, George Catlin, Emma Willard, J.P. Morgan, Rev. Joshua Leavitt, Rev. Horace Hooker, Roger Hooker Leavitt, Hart Leavitt, Frank Nelson Doubleday, John Turner Sargent, Thom Miller, Adonijah Rockwell and Nathan Watson. On May 16, 1890, descendants of Thomas Hooker held their first reunion at Hartford, Connecticut.

== Notable Hooker descendants ==
- Allen Butler Talcott, painter
- John Butler Talcott, industrialist and founder of the New Britain Museum of American Art
- Elon Huntington Hooker, industrialist and founder of the Hooker Electrochemical Company.

== Works ==
- The Application of Redemption. 1659.
- A Brief Exposition of the Lord's Prayer. London: Moses Bell. 1645.
- The Christian's Two Chief Lessons: Self-Denial and Self-Trial.
- The Covenant of Grace Opened.
- The Danger of Desertion Or A Farewell Sermon of Mr. Thomas Hooker.
- An Exposition of the Principles of Religion. 1645.
- Hooker, Thomas (1629). The Poor Doubting Christian Drawn to Christ.
- The Saint's Dignity and Duty. 1651.
- The Soul's Exaltation. London: John Haviland. 1638.
- The Soul's Humiliation. International Outreach.
- The Soul's Ingrafting into Christ. 1637.
- The Soul's Preparation for Christ: Or, A Treatise of Contrition, Wherein is discovered How God breaks the heart, and wounds the Soul, in the conversion of a Sinner to Himself The Soul's Preparation for Christ. 1632.
- A Survey Of The Summe Of Church-Discipline: Wherein The Way Of The Churches Of New England Is Warranted Out Of The Word. London: John Bellamy. 1648.
