= George Benson (Quaker) =

American Quaker abolitionist (1808–1879)

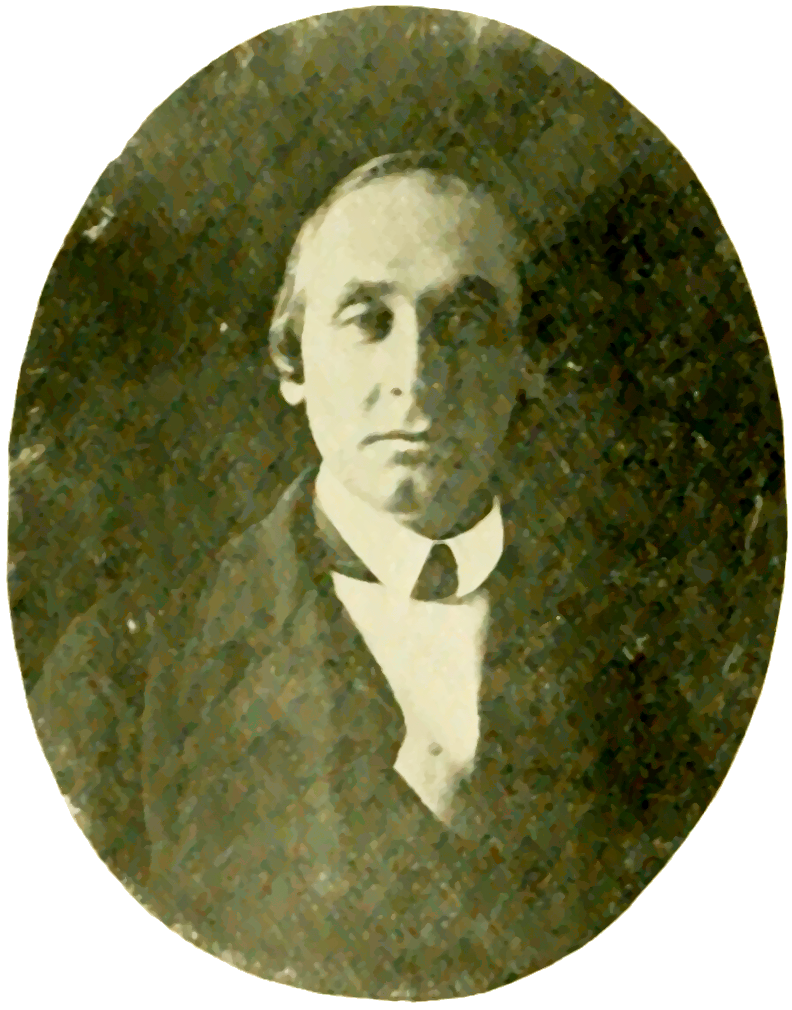
George W. Benson, from daguerreotype taken about 1845

George William Benson (1808–1879) was an American Quaker abolitionist from Connecticut who assisted Prudence Crandall in her education efforts.

He was one of the founders of the utopian Northampton Association for Education and Industry, and was the brother-in-law of William Lloyd Garrison. Sojourner Truth, who worked for him for a time as a housekeeper, was introduced to Garrisonian abolitionism in his home, which Crandall called an "asylum for the oppressed."

He worked for The Liberator and the American Anti-Slavery Society.

His father George Benson (Sr.) (1752–1836) had also been active in opposing slavery in the United States, at one time president of the New England Anti-Slavery Society.
