= Ross Farm (Northampton, Massachusetts) =

- Hill-Ross Homestead
- U.S. National Register of Historic Places
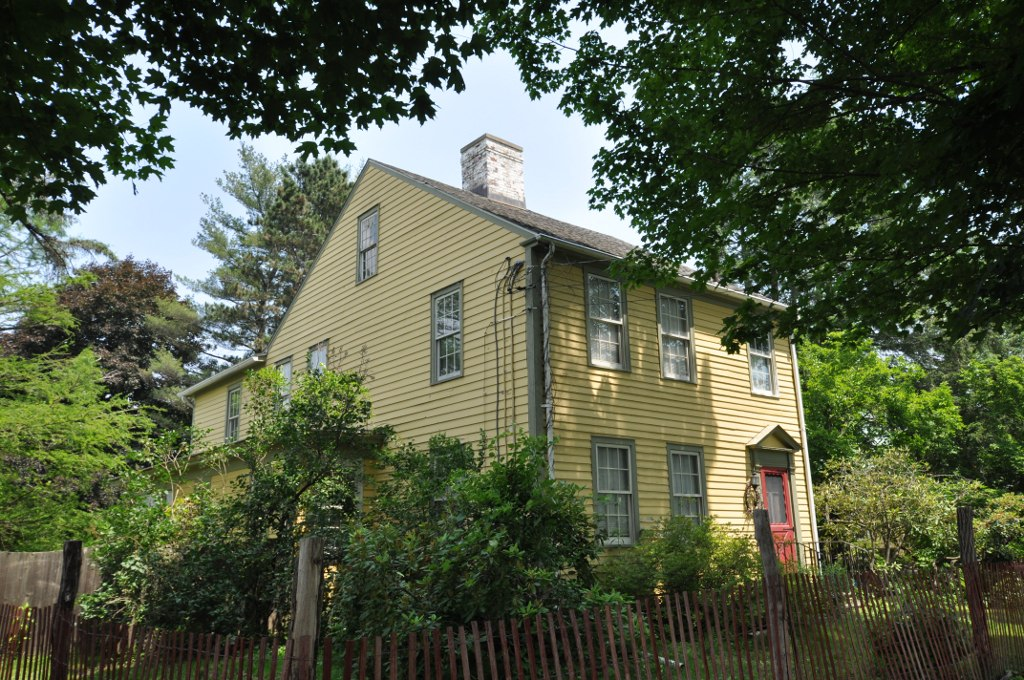
- Ross Farm in 2013

- Location within Massachusetts Location within the United States
- Location: Northampton, Massachusetts
- Coordinates: 42°20′2″N 72°40′49″W
- Built: Circa 1825
- Architectural style: Greek Revival
- MPS: Underground Railroad in Massachusetts MPS
- NRHP reference No.: 07001360
- Added to NRHP: January 8, 2008

Ross Farm now called, Hill-Ross Homestead is a historic farmhouse at 123 Meadow Street in Northampton, Massachusetts. Its importance rests in its significance as the site of a utopian community that operated there from 1841 to 1845, and for its use as a site on the Underground Railroad. Once part of a 300-acre (120 ha) parcel, the property has been reduced to 2.25 acres (0.91 ha), with multiple significant structures dating from 1825 to 1915.

== History ==
The farmhouse was built by Thomas Burt, whose father acquired the property in 1798. The house is a typical late colonial/early Federalist center chimney layout, and retains many of its original features, despite a number of alterations. A 19th century piazza (porch) was removed early in the 20th century, and a Colonial Revival entry and brick stoop were added at the time in an apparent effort to restore the house's appearance. In 1834 Burt sold the property to Samuel Whitmarsh, under whose ownership the property reached its greatest extent. Whitmarsh planted mulberry trees and built a silk mill on the nearby Mill River. He sold the house and 150 acres (61 ha) to the Northampton Association for Education and Industry (NAEI), who operated the property as an experiment in communal living until 1845. The farm next came into the hands of Austin Ross, whose family owned the property until 1902.

Under the Ross family ownership two outbuildings were built: a hay barn just east of the house and a tobacco drying barn on the northern end of the surviving property (both built c. 1880). A corn crib was added in the early 1900s, and a utilitarian concrete worker housing structure was added in the 1950s. None of the outbuildings contribute to the importance of the property. The property was listed on the National Register of Historic Places in 2008.

== Utopian community and Underground Railroad ==
The NAEI was part of a movement in the 1840s in which a number of communal living societies were established (one of the more well-known was Brook Farm outside Boston). One of the leaders of the NAEI was George Benson, brother-in-law to abolitionist firebrand William Lloyd Garrison. The organization operated the silk works begun by Whitmarsh, and provided a school, a store, and housing for the community members. Its membership peaked in 1844 with 120 members. It was operated on principles of equality, and most of its members were dedicated abolitionists. They in particular included African Americans in the community, a rarity for the time, including Sojourner Truth. The property has a well documented history as a major meeting point on the Underground Railroad.

Austin Ross came from Chaplin, Connecticut, and was, like the NAEI members, a committed abolitionist. The farm continued to act as a station on the Underground Railroad during his ownership.

== See also ==
- National Register of Historic Places listings in Hampshire County, Massachusetts
- David Ruggles
