= Joshua Leavitt =

American Congregational minister and lawyer (1794–1873)

The Reverend Joshua Leavitt
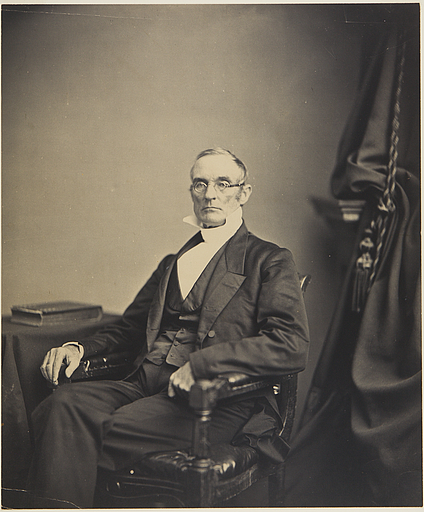
- Portrait, c. 1860
- Born: September 8, 1794; Heath, Massachusetts, U.S.
- Died: January 16, 1873 (aged 78); Brooklyn, New York City, U.S.
- Occupations: Congregationalist minister; lawyer; editor; social reformer; writer
- Known for: Editor of the The Emancipator, The New York Independent, The New York Evangelist
- Spouse: Sarah Williams (m. 1820)
- Children: 6
- Relatives: Jonathan Leavitt (paternal grandfather); Roger Hooker Leavitt (brother); Hart Leavitt (brother)

Religious life
- Religion: Christianity
- Denomination: Congregationalist
- Church: Protestant
- Profession: Evangelist

Joshua Leavitt (September 8, 1794 – January 16, 1873) was an American Congregationalist minister and former lawyer who became a prominent writer, editor and publisher of abolitionist literature. He was also a spokesman for the Liberty Party and a prominent campaigner for cheap postage. Leavitt served as editor of The Emancipator, The New York Independent, The New York Evangelist, and other periodicals. He was the first secretary of the American Temperance Society and co-founder of the New York City Anti-Slavery Society.

== Biography ==
Born in Heath, Massachusetts, in the Berkshires, Leavitt attended Yale College, where he graduated at age twenty. He subsequently studied law and practiced for a time in Putney, Vermont, before matriculating at the Yale Theological Seminary for a three-year course of study. He was subsequently ordained as a Congregational clergyman at Stratford, Connecticut. After four years in Stratford, Rev. Leavitt decamped for New York City, where he first became secretary of the American Seamens' Friend Society, and began his 44-year career as editor of Sailors' Magazine. Thus was Leavitt launched on his career as social reformer, temperance spokesman, editor, abolitionist and religious proselytizer.

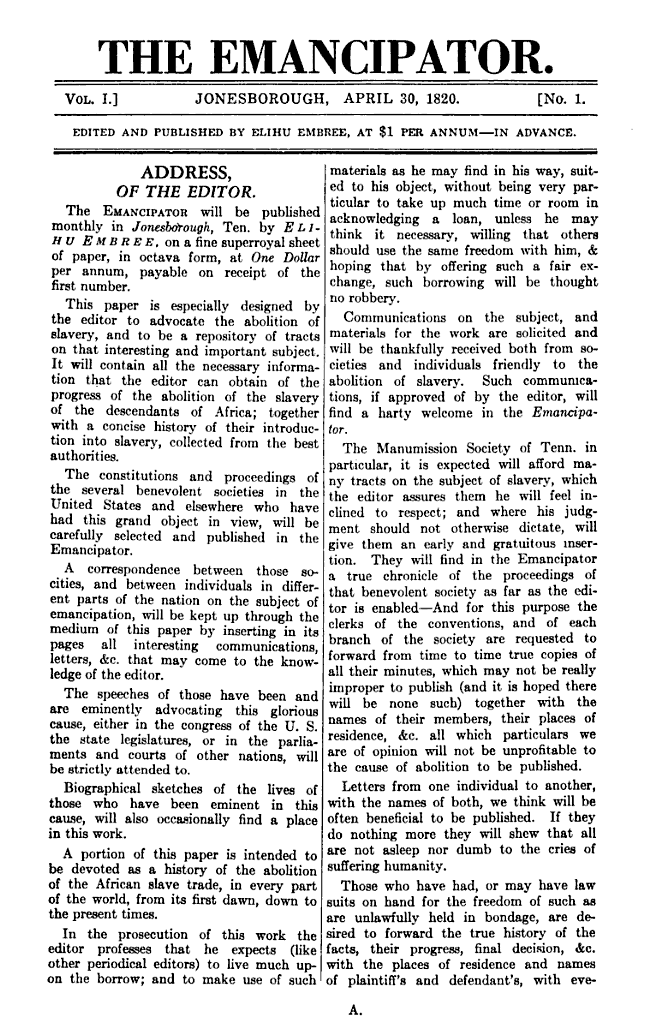
The Emancipator, an abolitionist broadsheet edited by Rev. Joshua Leavitt

Leavitt was heavily involved in a series of high-profile anti-slavery cases, including the escape of the slave Basil Dorsey from Maryland into Massachusetts (Leavitt aided Dorsey's passage northward, and members of the extended Leavitt family helped shelter Dorsey in Massachusetts), as well as the La Amistad case, in which enslaved Africans on a Spanish ship rebelled and took control. Leavitt played a pivotal role in the Amistad events, when on September 4, 1839, he, Lewis Tappan, and Simeon Jocelyn formed the Amistad Committee to raise funds for the defense of the Amistad captives.

One of Leavitt's major accomplishments was helping to provide the intellectual underpinnings of the abolitionist argument through his writing and publishing. In 1841, for instance, Leavitt published his Financial Power of Slavery, a compelling document which argued that the South was draining the national economy through its reliance on slavery. He died in Brooklyn, New York, on January 16, 1873.

== The Christian Lyre ==
Leavitt published The Christian Lyre in 1830, the "first American tunebook to take the form of a modern hymnal, with music for every hymn (melody and bass only) and the multistanza hymns printed in full, under or beside the music". It later became one of the standard tunebooks used in the 1830s New England Revivalism movement.

== Family ==
Rev. Joshua Leavitt came from a long line of religious figures. His father was Col. Roger Leavitt, a wealthy landowner and Massachusetts legislator, and his mother Chloe (Maxwell) Leavitt. His grandfather was the Congregational minister Rev. Jonathan Leavitt, a 1758 graduate of Yale and pastor of Charlemont, Massachusetts. The Leavitt family had ties to religious institutions since Joshua Leavitt's ancestor John Leavitt served as founding deacon of Old Ship Church in Hingham, Massachusetts, and his ancestor Rev. Thomas Hooker had left the Massachusetts Bay Colony to found the state of Connecticut.

Rev. Joshua Leavitt's son William was a Congregational minister in Hudson, New York. Aside from Rev. Joshua Leavitt, other members of the Leavitt family were prominent abolitionists. The National Park service lists two Leavitt family properties in upstate Massachusetts – the Hart and Mary Leavitt House, as well as the Roger Hooker and Keziah Leavitt House – on its National Underground Railroad historic sites tour. The entire extended family of Rev. Joshua Leavitt can be considered ardent – and active – abolitionist sympathizers.

== See also ==
- Roger Hooker Leavitt
- Hart Leavitt
- Underground Railroad

== Notes ==
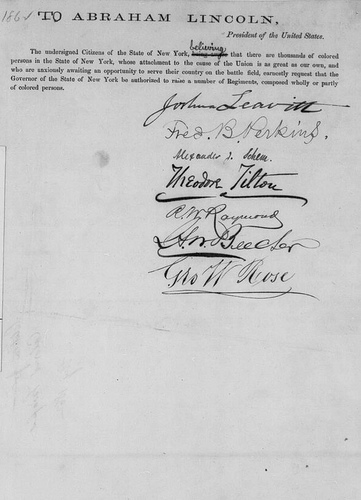
Letter by Leavitt, Henry Ward Beecher, Theodore Tilton and other abolitionists to Abraham Lincoln requesting raising of black regiments in Union Army, August 1862
