= Heath, Massachusetts =

Town in Massachusetts, United States

- Town
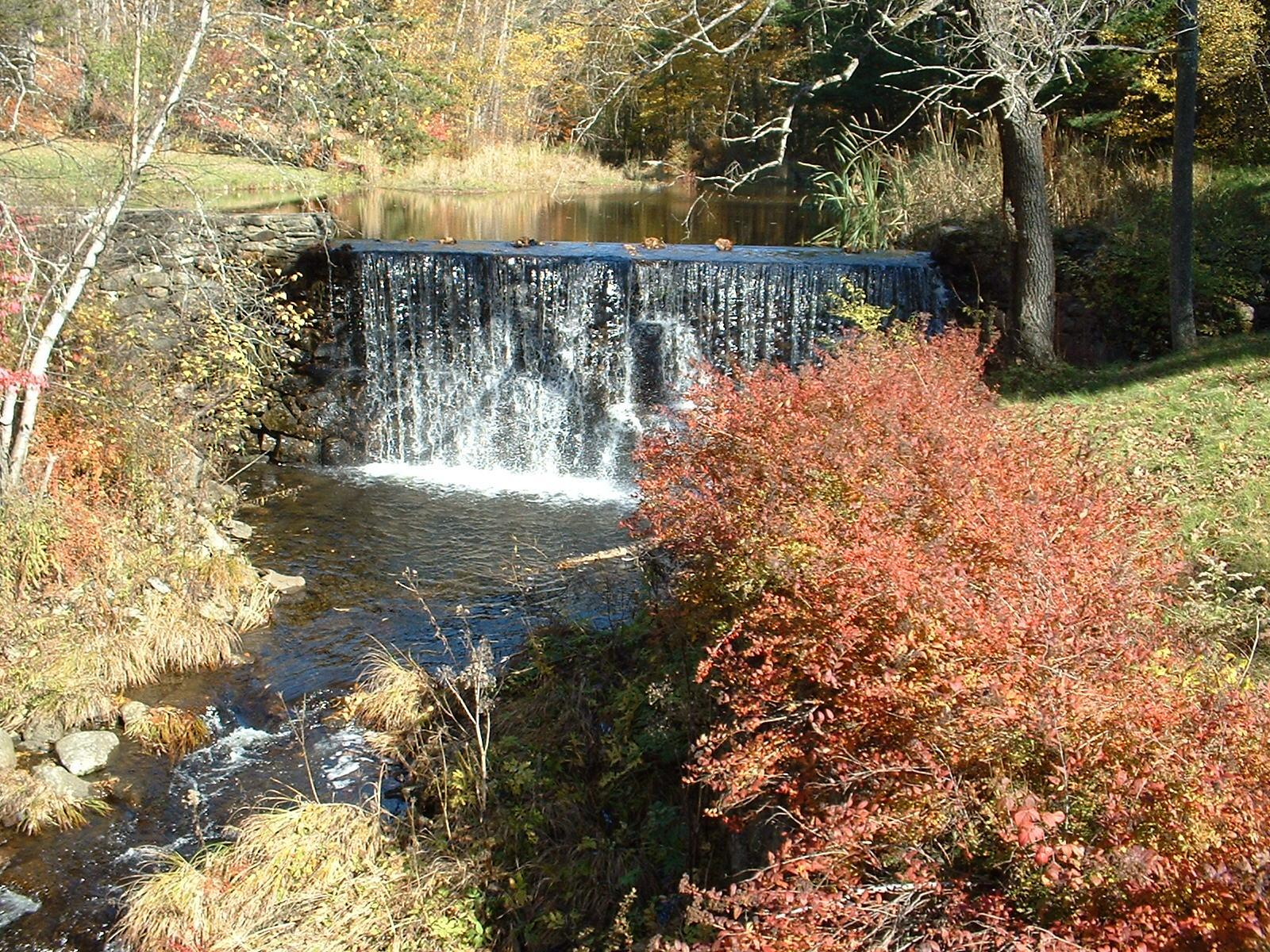
- Dell Dam in autumn

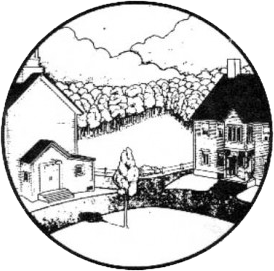
- Seal

- Location in Franklin County in Massachusetts
- Coordinates: 42°40′24″N 72°49′20″W
- Country: United States
- State: Massachusetts
- County: Franklin
- Settled: 1765
- Incorporated: 1785

Government
  - Type: Open town meeting

Area
  - Total: 24.9 sq mi (64.5 km^{2})
  - Land: 24.9 sq mi (64.5 km^{2})
  - Water: 0.039 sq mi (0.1 km^{2})
- Elevation: 1,729 ft (527 m)

Population (2020)
  - Total: 723
  - Density: 29.0/sq mi (11.2/km^{2})
- Time zone: UTC−5 (Eastern)
  - Summer (DST): UTC−4 (Eastern)
- ZIP Codes: 01346 (Heath); 01339 (Charlemont); 01340 (Colrain); 01367 (Rowe)
- Area code: 413
- FIPS code: 25-29650
- GNIS feature ID: 0618167
- Website: www.townofheath.org

Heath is a town in Franklin County, Massachusetts, United States. The population was 723 at the 2020 census. It is part of the Springfield, Massachusetts Metropolitan Statistical Area.

== History ==
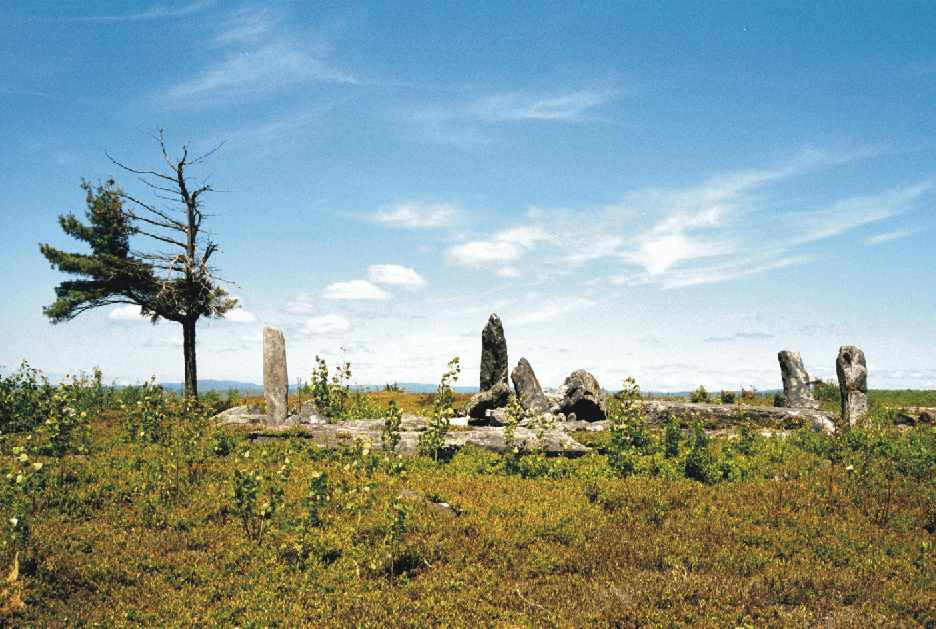
Burnt Hill Stone Circle, a Pre-Columbian site in Heath

Heath was first settled in 1765 as a part of Charlemont. The town, as well as neighboring Rowe, separated, and Heath was officially incorporated in 1785, just a few days after its new neighbor. The town is named after William Heath, Major General of Massachusetts and Brigadier General in the national army during the American Revolution.

General Heath had been the commanding officer and friend of Col. Hugh Maxwell, a local citizen who suggested the town be named in his honor. In 1784 Maxwell, who was severely wounded at the Battle of Bunker Hill by a bullet through his shoulder, was chosen to represent Heath at the General Court in Boston and obtain a division of the town from Charlemont. Accordingly, the new town was incorporated on February 14, 1785.

Chloe Maxwell, daughter of Col. Maxwell, was married to prominent local landowner and state legislator abolitionist Roger Leavitt. Their son was the Congregational minister, lawyer, social reformer, editor and fervent abolitionist Rev. Joshua Leavitt, who after his graduation from Yale College was the first lawyer to practice in Heath. (Rev. Leavitt soon gave up law for the ministry, training at Yale Theological Seminary and settling in Stratford, Connecticut, before decamping for New York City and a career that included the editorship of The Emancipator.) Members of the Leavitt family of Heath and Charlemont provided stops on the Underground Railroad, and in some cases sheltered slaves like Basil Dorsey who were fleeing the South.

The town had some farming and other small industry in the nineteenth century, but much of it is gone now, leaving the town as a rural area. One of its more distinctive industries was a straw hat business, where palm fronds were imported from the Carolinas to be woven by women and children during their free time. Each year, the Heath Agricultural Society hosts the Heath Fair, a small agriculturally-focused fair held two weekends before Labor Day.

== Geography ==
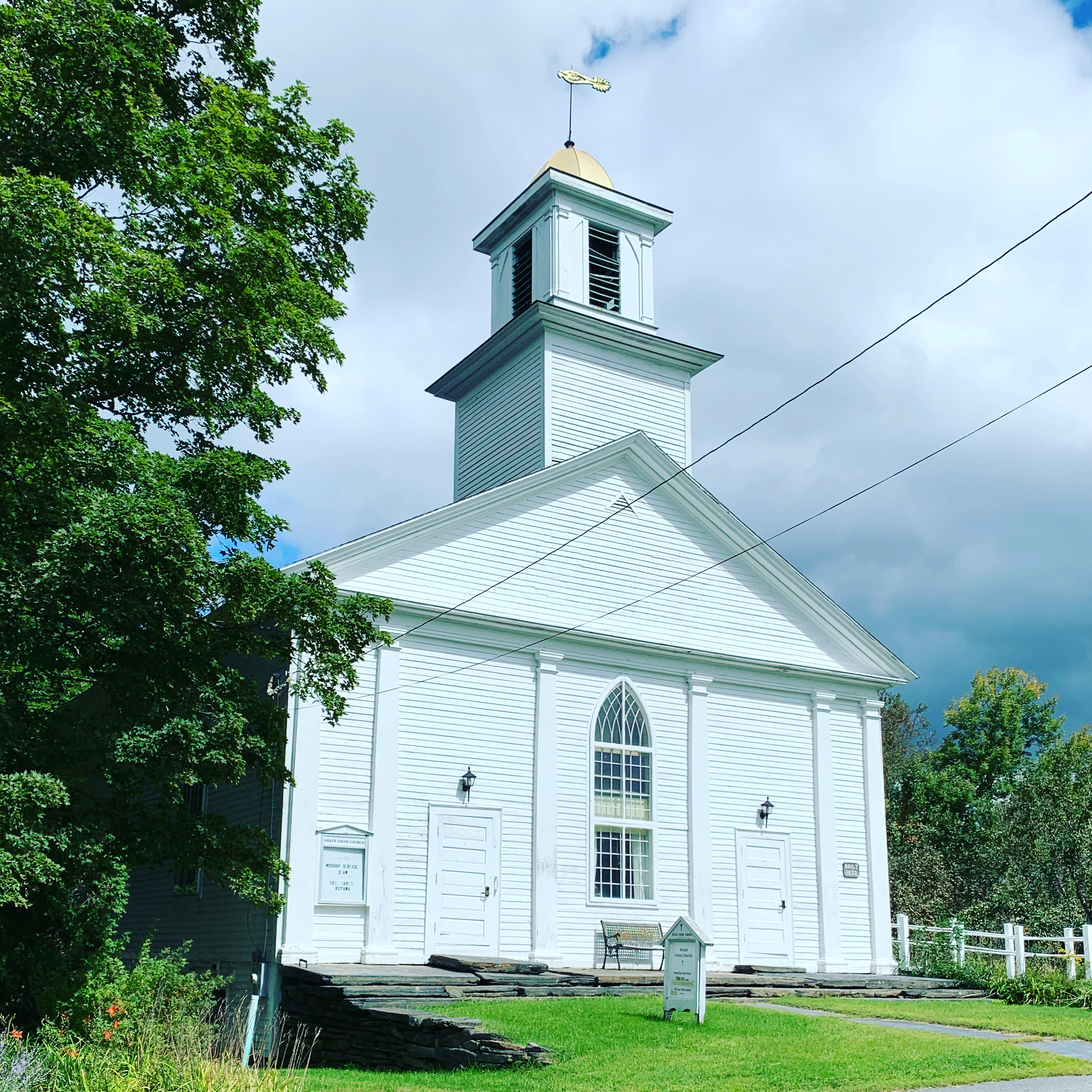
Heath Union Church

According to the United States Census Bureau, the town has a total area of 24.9 square miles (64 km^{2}), of which 24.9 square miles (64 km^{2}) is land and 0.04 square miles (0.10 km^{2}), or 0.08%, is water. Heath lies along the Vermont border between Franklin and Windham counties. Heath is bordered by Whitingham and Halifax, Vermont, to the north, Colrain to the east, Charlemont to the south and southwest, and Rowe to the west. Heath is located 17 miles (27 km) northwest of Greenfield, 49 miles (79 km) north-northwest of Springfield, and 106 miles (171 km) west-northwest of Boston.

Heath is located in the northeastern portion of the Berkshires, with the highest point being Burnt Hill to the southeast. Heath is fed by the West Branch of the North River, which originates near the state line and heads south-eastward towards Colrain. Several brooks also feed into this and the nearby Deerfield River, and there is a large settlement around Papoose Lake, which drains into the Taylor Brook and eventually the North River.

Massachusetts Route 8A runs from Charlemont towards its terminus at the Vermont border, where it becomes Vermont Route 8A (this route, however, never rejoins Vermont Route 8, but rather joins Vermont Route 112). Route 8A is the main link between Heath and Charlemont, where it meets Massachusetts Route 2 (the Mohawk Trail) and provides access to the region. The nearest expressway, Interstate 91, is accessible in Greenfield. The town has no rail, bus or air service. The nearest bus and small air service is in Greenfield and Turners Falls, respectively, and the nearest Amtrak service is in Greenfield. The nearest national air service can be reached at Albany International Airport in New York.

== Demographics ==
Historical population
Year	Pop.	±%
1790	379	—
1850	803	+111.9%
1860	661	−17.7%
1870	613	−7.3%
1880	560	−8.6%
1890	503	−10.2%
1900	441	−12.3%
1910	346	−21.5%
1920	325	−6.1%
1930	331	+1.8%
1940	359	+8.5%
1950	305	−15.0%
1960	304	−0.3%
1970	383	+26.0%
1980	482	+25.8%
1990	716	+48.5%
2000	805	+12.4%
2010	706	−12.3%
2020	723	+2.4%
2024*	721	−0.3%
* = population estimate. Source: United States census records and Population Estimates Program data.

As of the census of 2000, there were 805 people, 292 households, and one family residing in the town. By population, Heath ranks twenty-first of the twenty-six towns in Franklin County, and 332nd out of the 351 cities and towns in the Commonwealth. The population density was 32.3 inhabitants per square mile (12.5/km^{2}), which ranks twentieth in the county and 327th in the Commonwealth. There were 648 housing units at an average density of 26.0 per square mile (10.0/km^{2}). The racial makeup of the town was 97.76% White, 0.50% Asian, 0.37% from other races, and 1.37% from two or more races. Hispanic or Latino of any race were 0.62% of the population.

There were 292 households, out of which 35.3% had children under the age of 18 living with them, 62.7% were married couples living together, 5.5% had a female householder with no husband present, and 27.1% were non-families. Of all households, 19.9% were made up of individuals, and 6.8% had someone living alone who was 65 years of age or older. The average household size was 2.76 and the average family size was 3.19.

In the town, the population was spread out, with 28.7% under the age of 18, 5.2% from 18 to 24, 26.2% from 25 to 44, 29.6% from 45 to 64, and 10.3% who were 65 years of age or older. The median age was 39 years. For every 100 females, there were 101.3 males. For every 100 females age 18 and over, there were 102.1 males.

The median income for a household in the town was $50,536, and the median income for a family was $55,938. Males had a median income of $32,188 versus $25,000 for females. The per capita income for the town was $24,777. About 6.5% of families and 9.4% of the population were below the poverty line, including 10.3% of those under age 18 and 4.8% of those age 65 or over.

== Government ==
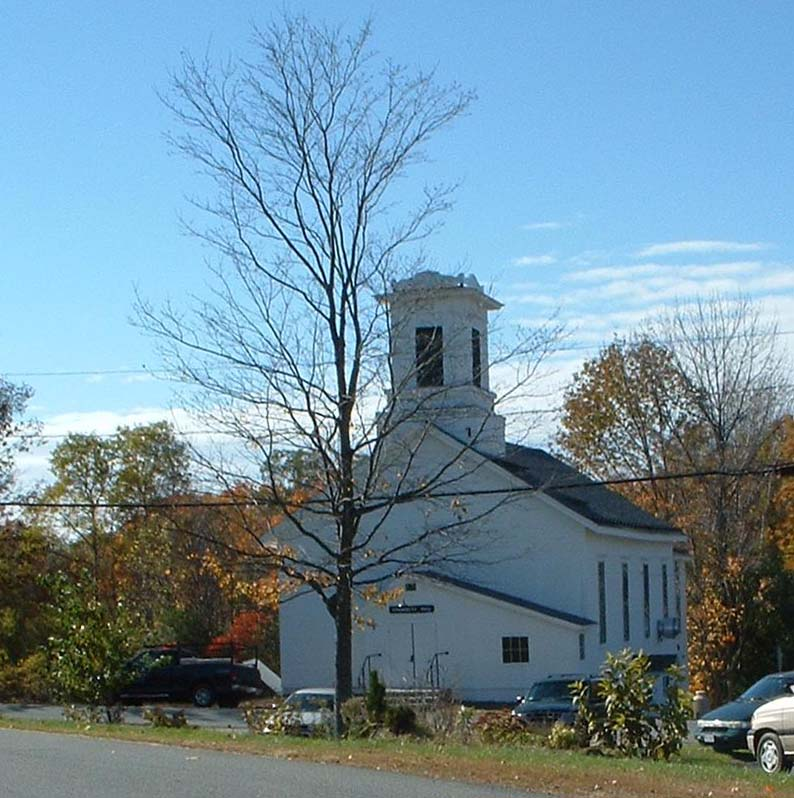
Heath Memorial Hall, site of town meetings

Heath employs the open town meeting form of government, and is led by a board of selectmen and an administrative assistant. The town has its own police and fire departments, as well as a post office. The town has a library, Heath Free Public Library, which is connected to the regional library network. The nearest hospital is the Franklin Medical Center in Greenfield.

On the state level, Heath is represented in the Massachusetts House of Representatives as part of the Second Berkshire district, represented by Paul Mark, which covers central Berkshire County, as well as portions of Hampshire and Franklin Counties. In the Massachusetts Senate, the town is part of the Berkshire, Hampshire and Franklin district, represented by Ben Downing, which includes all of Berkshire County and the western portions of Hampshire and Franklin Counties. The town is patrolled by the Second (Shelburne Falls) Station of Troop "B" of the Massachusetts State Police.

On the national level, Heath is represented in the United States House of Representatives as part of Massachusetts's 1st congressional district, and is represented by Richard Neal. Massachusetts is represented in the United States Senate by senior Senator Elizabeth Warren and junior Senator Ed Markey.

== Education ==
Heath is a member of the Mohawk Trail / Hawlemont Regional School District, which covers six towns on the elementary level and most of western Franklin County on the upper levels of education. Heath Elementary School serves students from pre-kindergarten through sixth grades, and students from grades 7–12 attend Mohawk Trail Regional High School in Buckland. There is a private school, the Academy at Charlemont, in neighboring Charlemont, and several other private and religious schools are located in the region.

The nearest community college, Greenfield Community College, is located in Greenfield. The nearest state college is Massachusetts College of Liberal Arts in North Adams, and the nearest state university is the University of Massachusetts Amherst. The nearest private college is Williams College in Williamstown, with several others located southeast in the Northampton area.

== Notable people ==
- Elsa Bakalar, garden designer
- Robert McAfee Brown, Presbyterian minister, theologian, and activist; made his summer home in Heath
- Felix Frankfurter, Supreme Court Justice; made his summer home in Heath
- Jonathan Leavitt, first minister of Charlemont, longtime resident of Heath
- Alastair Maitland, Diplomat and consul-general retired in Heath
- Reinhold Niebuhr, made his summer home in Heath, where in 1934 he first delivered the famous Serenity Prayer
- Jackson Temple, Justice of the California Supreme Court, was born in Heath
- Sarah Hartshorne, contestant on Cycle 9 of America's Next Top Model
