= The Emancipator (newspaper) =

American anti-slavery newspaper

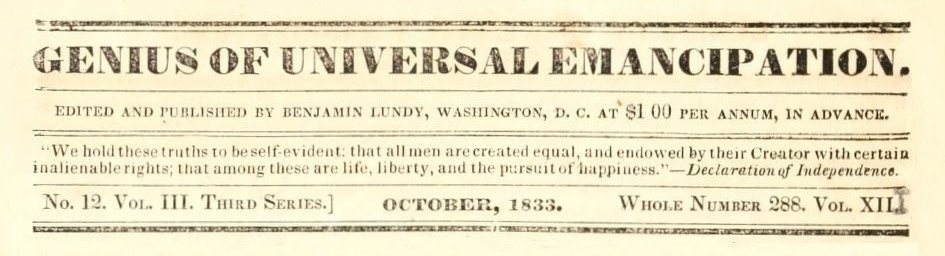
- (nameplate); Genius of Universal Emancipation; Vol. 3, No. 12 (Whole No. 288) (third series); October 1833
- Type: Weekly newspaper
- Owner(s): American Anti-Slavery Society (1833–1836); Liberty Party (1840–1850)
- Founder: Arthur Tappan
- Editor: Joshua Leavitt (1840–1848)
- Founded: March 1833; 193 years ago
- Ceased publication: December 26, 1850; 175 years ago
- Political alignment: Abolitionist
- Language: English
- City: New York City (1833–March 1844); Boston (1842–1850)
- Country: United States

The Emancipator (1833–1850) was an American abolitionist newspaper, at first published in New York City and later in Boston. It was founded as the official newspaper of the American Anti-Slavery Society (AASS). From 1840 to 1850, it was published by the Liberty Party; the publication changed names several times as it merged with other abolitionist newspapers in Boston.

Contributors to the paper included Lewis Tappan (of the Amistad case), James McCune Smith (who also co-edited The Colored American), Joseph Cammett Lovejoy, Samuel Edmund Sewall, Henry Brewster Stanton, Horace Edwin Smith, William Ellery Channing, and William Stevens Robinson.

== History ==
The Emancipator was founded in March 1833 in New York City by Arthur Tappan, a wealthy abolitionist and president of the American Anti-Slavery Society. The March 1833 publication marked the beginning of the abolitionist movement in New York state. The Emancipator's first editor was Charles Wheeler Denison.

African-American sales agents selected to represent the new publication included:

- David Ruggles, New York City, who was the general agent (Note: Ruggles, who was bookseller and publisher, advertised for additional agents to distribute anti-slavery newspapers.)
- John D. Closson, Newark, New Jersey
- Thomas Van Rensslear, Princeton, New Jersey
- Abraham Doras Shadd, Pennsylvania
- John Carlisle, Pennsylvania

On October 25, 1835, in a nationally publicized spectacle, a Tuscaloosa County, Alabama, grand jury issued a true bill against Robert G. Williams, agent and publisher of The Emancipator, for allegedly "circulating seditious pamphlets in Alabama" ... "tending to excite our slave population to insurrection and murder." On November 14, 1835, the Alabama Governor, John Gayle demanded that New York Governor William Learned Marcy extradite Williams, "a fugitive," to stand trial. Marcy refused.

From 1836 to 1840, the editor was Theodore Dwight Weld. After Weld left this position, Joshua Leavitt succeeded him as editor.

In 1840, the American and Foreign Anti-Slavery Society splintered from the American Anti-Slavery Society. The Emancipator then became Leavitt's personal publication and a leading journal of the Liberty Party, with Leavitt continuing as the editor of the newspaper until 1848.

The newspaper underwent several name changes between 1842 and 1848 as it slowly merged with other abolitionist newspapers located in Boston. Throughout this period, the publication was a continual exponent of abolitionism. In January 1842, the publication merged with The Free American, the official newspaper of the Massachusetts Abolition Society, and was published weekly as The Emancipator and Free American. Leavitt (New York) and Elizur Wright (Boston) served as co-editors until March 1844, when Wright left and the journal moved its headquarters to Boston.

The publication (at that point known as the Emancipator & Republican) published its final issue on December 26, 1850.

== Timelines ==
=== Editors ===
1833–1834	Charles Wheeler Denison
1834–1835	William Goodell
1836	Amos Augustus Phelps
1836–1840	Theodore Dwight Weld
1840–1841	Joshua Leavitt
1842–1844	Joshua Leavitt (New York) and Elizur Wright (Boston)
1844	John Greenleaf Whittier (for a short period)
1845–1848	Joshua Leavitt
March 1848	Curtis C. Nichols
1848–1850	Henry Wilson, followed by Lucius Edwin Smith

=== Publication name ===
Mar. 1833–Jan. 1842	The Emancipator
Jan. 1842–Mar. 1844	The Emancipator and Free American
Mar. 27, 1844–Oct. 8, 1845	The Emancipator and Weekly Chronicle
Oct. 15, 1845–Sept. 13, 1848	The Emancipator
Sept. 20, 1848–Nov. 8, 1848	The Emancipator and Free Soil Press, organ of the Free Soil Party (ending Vol. 8, No. 29, Whole No. 653)
Nov. 17, 1848–Dec. 26, 1850	Emancipator & Republican (Vol. 4, No. 6; ending Vol. 15, No. 35). (Note: The short-lived Commonwealth and Emancipator, launched in 1851, had no connection to the Emancipator & Republican. It was first published in Boston January 4, 1851 (Vol. 1, No. 1), with William S. Damrell & Co. publisher) and Joseph Lyman editor.)

=== Publishers ===
The Emancipator
1835–1841	Robert G. Williams (né Ransom Goss Williams), publisher in New York City
1845–1848	Rev. Hiram Cummings, publisher in Boston
Emancipator & Republican
1849	Henry Wilson, publisher in Boston, February 9, 1849 – August 16, 1849
1849–1850	Wilson & Bent – Henry Wilson and John Bent, publishers in Boston, August 23, 1849 – December 26, 1850

== Gallery ==
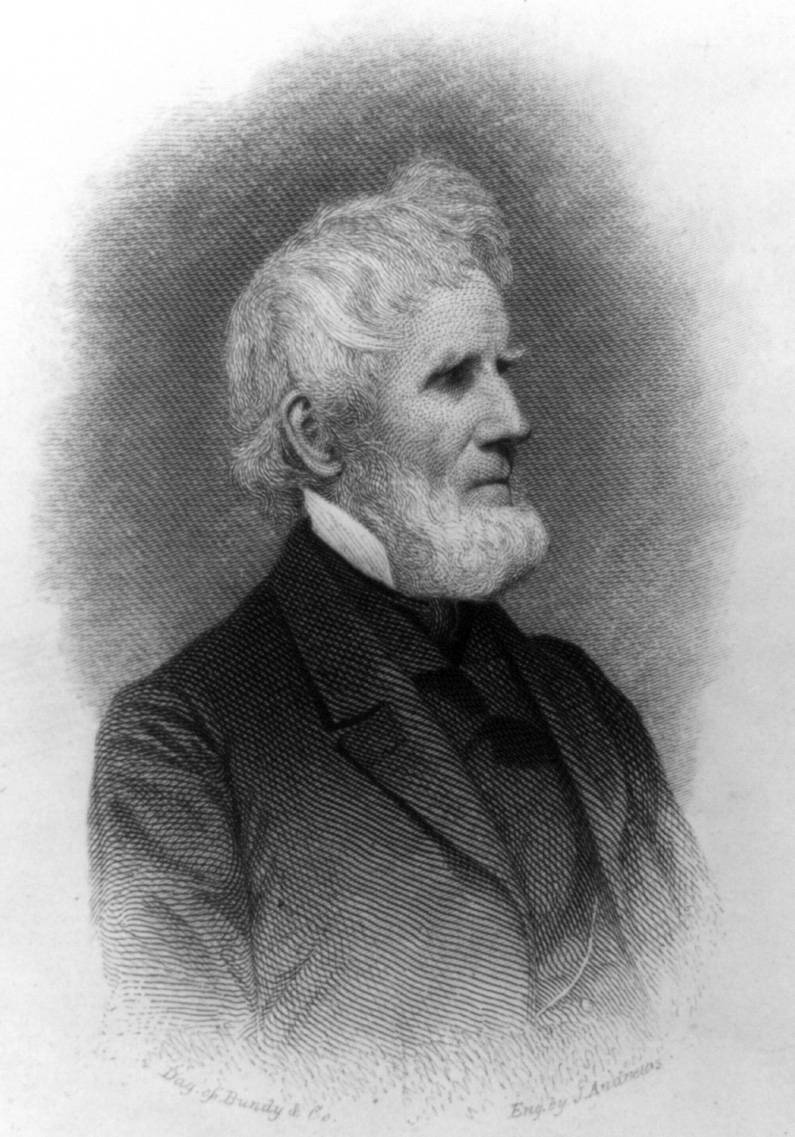
Arthur Tappan

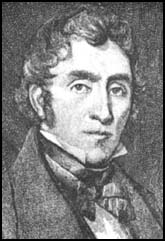
Benjamin Lundy

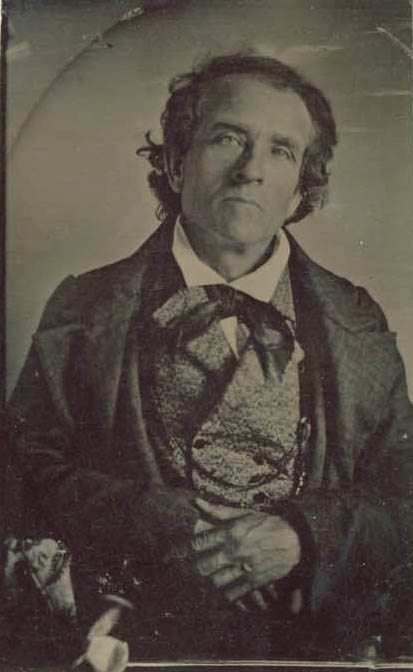
Theodore Dwight Weld

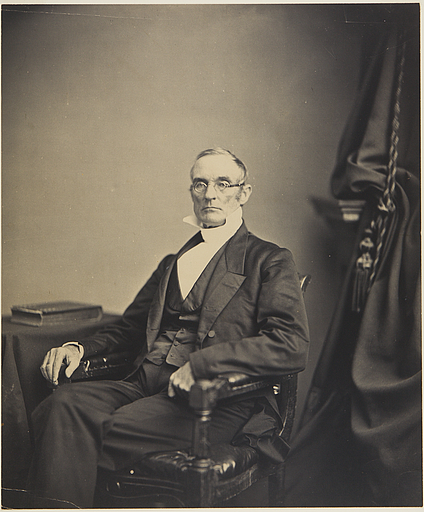
Joshua Leavitt

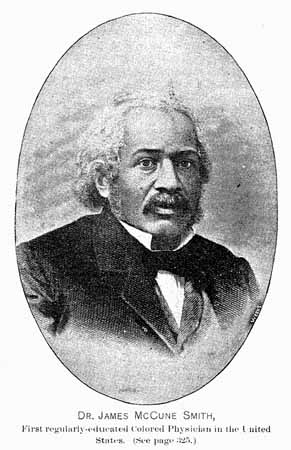
James McCune Smith

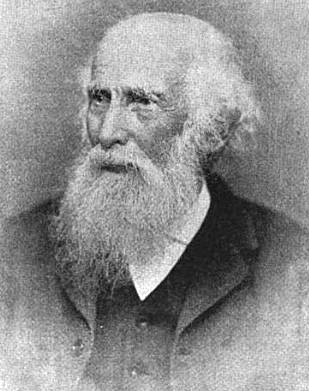
Elizur Wright

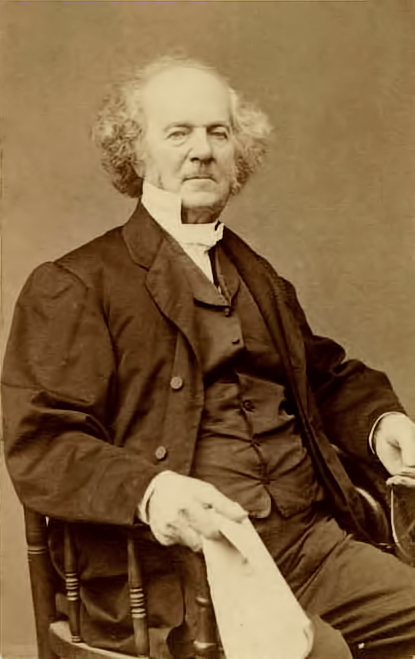
Lewis Tappan

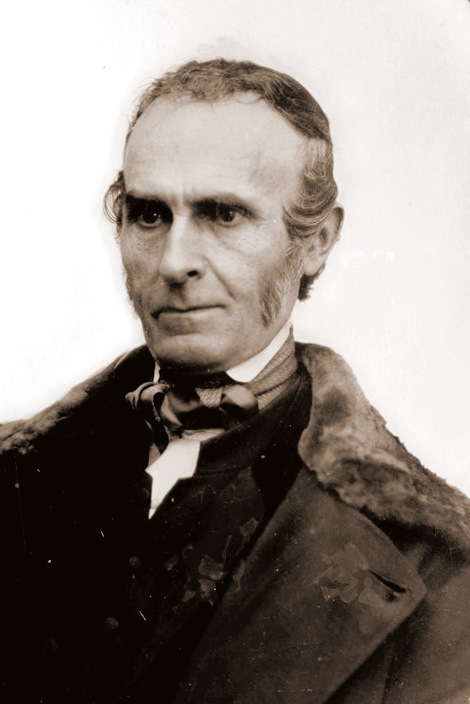
John Greenleaf Whittier

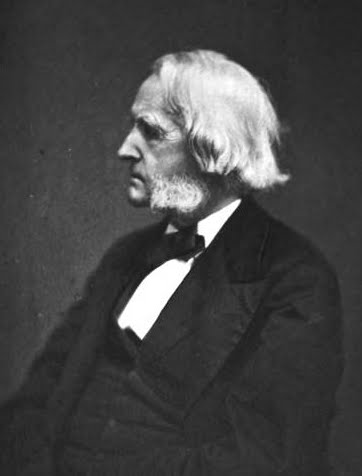
Samuel Edmund Sewall

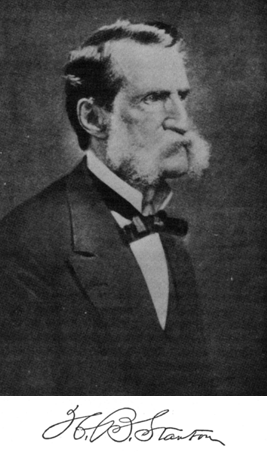
Henry Brewster Stanton

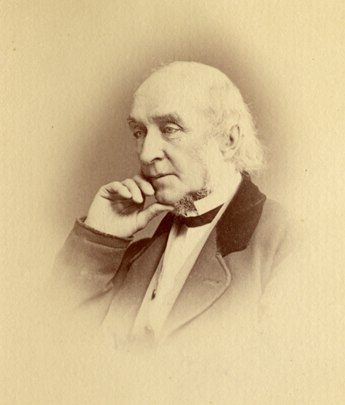
William Ellery Channing

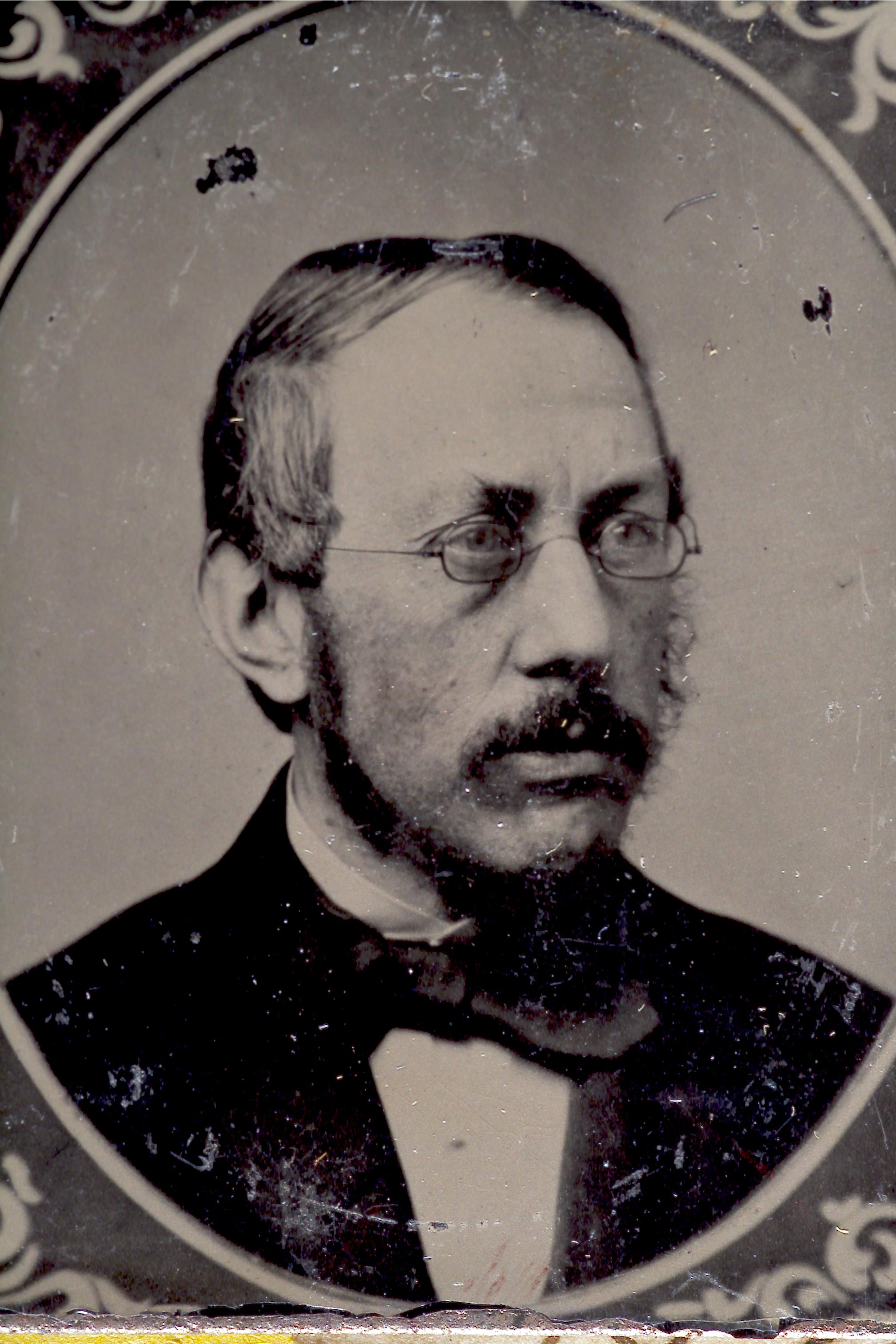
William Stevens Robinson

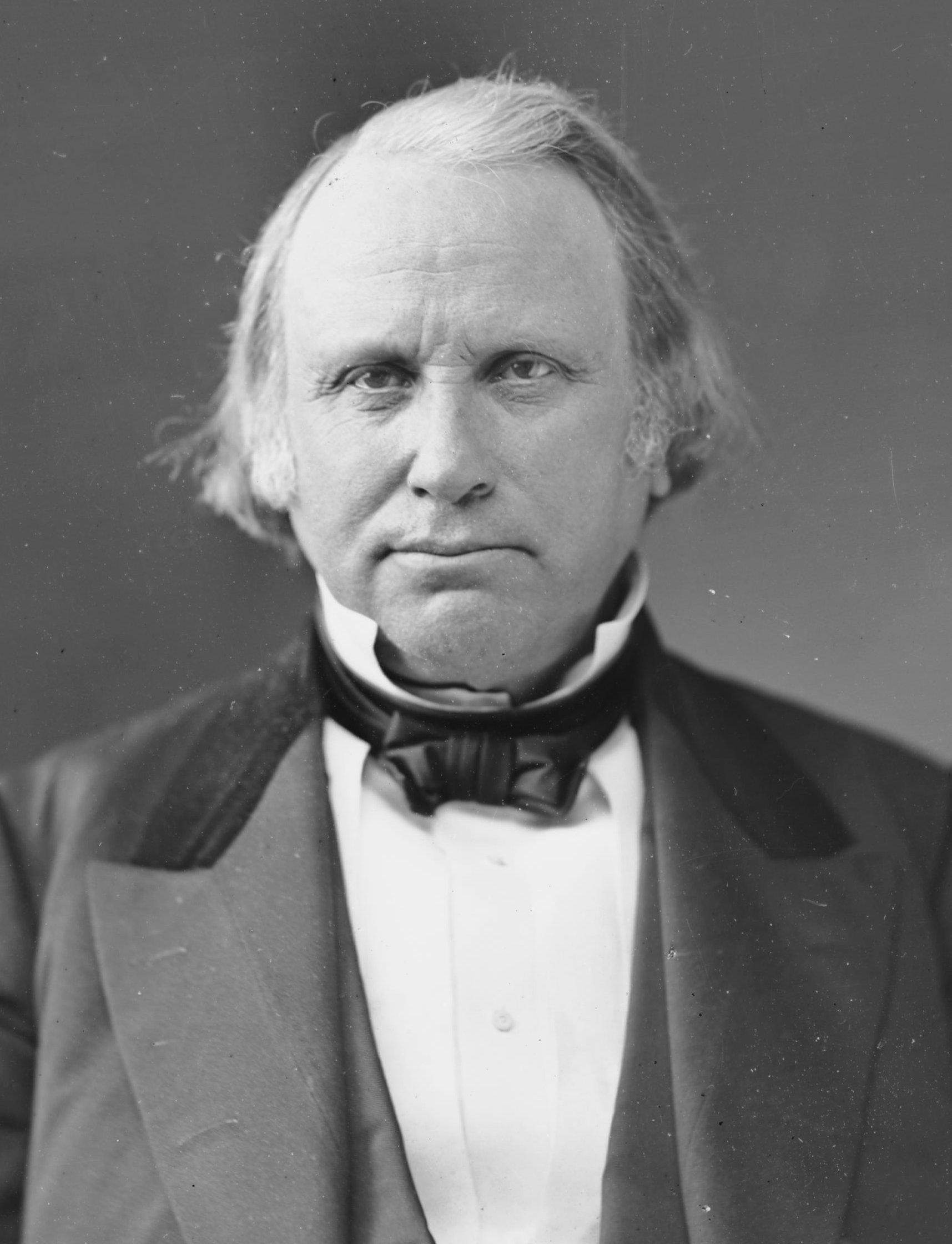
Henry Wilson

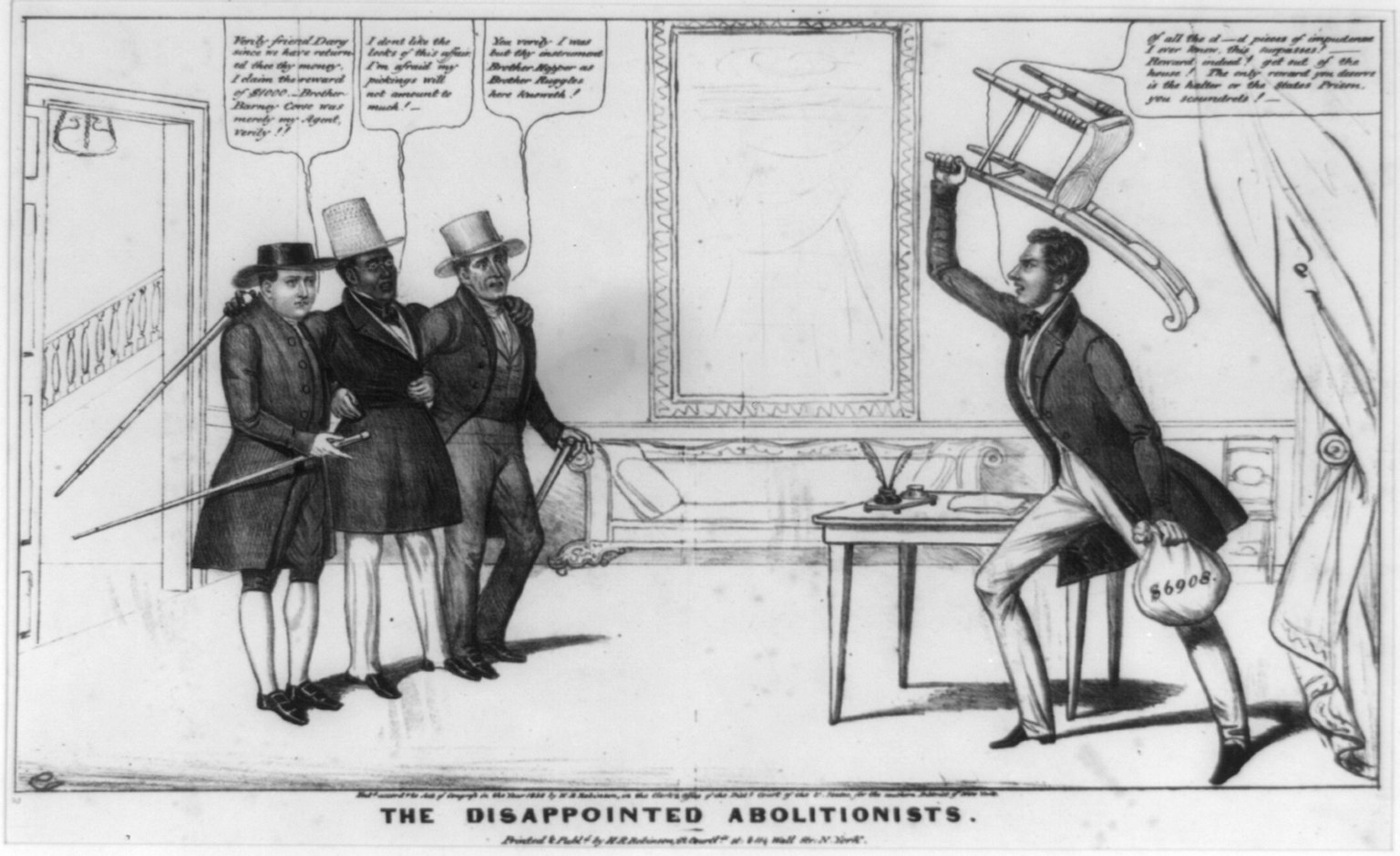
David Ruggles and others confronting John P. Darg
(center)

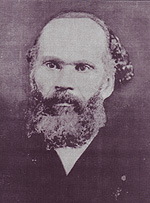
Abraham Doras Shadd

== Extant holdings, re-prints, and digital facsimiles ==
- The Emancipator (–1834)

The Historical Society of Wisconsin (microfilm 1966); OCLC 318815042

- The Emancipator, and Journal of Public Morals (1834–1835)

The Historical Society of Wisconsin (microfilm 1966); OCLC 318814260
Gale (online); OCLC 865521505

- The Emancipator (1833–1848)

Gale (online); OCLC 865521587

- The Emancipator (1835–1840)

Filmed from the Schomberg Collection (1967 microfilm); OCLC 4996989

- The Emancipator (1845–1848)

NewsBank (online); OCLC 10352375
Gale (online); OCLC 824798074

- Emancipator and Free American (1842–1844)

Gale (online); OCLC 192107281, 723812438, 1060722598
(microform); OCLC 32651685

- Emancipator and Weekly Chronicle (1844–1845)

Filmed from the New York Public Library (microfilm); OCLC 32651724

- Emancipator and Free Soil Press

NewsBank (online); OCLC 10352445
Gale (online); OCLC 865521597

- Emancipator & Republican

Microfilm; OCLC 38872229
Gale (online); OCLC 1100208152, 723812372
Serials Solutions (online); OCLC 1060831572

== See also ==
- Abolitionist publications
- New York Manumission Society
- American Anti-Slavery Society
- American and Foreign Anti-Slavery Society
- Boston Female Anti-Slavery Society
- Massachusetts Anti-Slavery Society
- Boston Vigilance Committee
- Fall River Female Anti Slavery Society
- Pennsylvania Anti-Slavery Society
- Philadelphia Female Anti-Slavery Society
- Vigilant Association of Philadelphia
- Ohio Anti-Slavery Society
