= List of Massachusetts municipal seals and flags =

List of flags of Massachusetts Municipalities

The following table displays the official seals and flags of the 351 municipalities in Massachusetts.

In 1899, the Massachusetts General Court passed Chapter 256, dictating that every municipality in Massachusetts must have a seal. There are no laws requiring municipalities to have their own flags, but most municipalities have adopted their own flags, many of which with the town seals on them.

== Table ==
Municipality	Seal	Flag
Abington		
Acton		
Acushnet		
Adams		
Agawam		
Alford		
Amesbury		
Amherst		
Andover		
Aquinnah		
Arlington		
Ashburnham		
Ashby		
Ashfield		
Ashland		
Athol		
Attleboro		
Auburn		
Avon		
Ayer		
Barnstable		
Barre		
Becket		
Bedford		
Belchertown		
Bellingham		
Belmont		
Berkley		
Berlin		
Bernardston		
Beverly		
Billerica		
Blackstone		
Blandford		
Bolton		
Boston		
Bourne		
Boxborough		
Boxford		
Boylston		
Braintree		
Brewster		
Bridgewater		
Brimfield		
Brockton		
Brookfield		
Brookline		
Buckland		
Burlington		
Cambridge		
Canton		
Carlisle		
Carver		
Charlemont		
Charlton		
Chatham		
Chelmsford		
Chelsea		
Cheshire		
Chester		
Chesterfield		
Chicopee		
Chilmark		
Clarksburg		
Clinton		
Cohasset		
Colrain		
Concord		
Conway		
Cummington		
Dalton		
Danvers		
Dartmouth		
Dedham		
Deerfield		
Dennis		
Dighton		
Douglas		
Dover		
Dracut		
Dudley		
Dunstable		
Duxbury		
East Bridgewater		
East Brookfield		
East Longmeadow		
Eastham		
Easthampton		
Easton		
Edgartown		
Egremont		
Erving		
Essex		
Everett		
Fairhaven		
Fall River		
Falmouth		
Fitchburg		
Florida		
Foxborough		
Framingham		
Franklin		
Freetown		
Gardner		
Georgetown		
Gill		
Gloucester		
Goshen		
Gosnold		
Grafton		
Granby		
Granville		
Great Barrington		
Greenfield		
Groton		
Groveland		
Hadley		
Halifax		
Hamilton		
Hampden		
Hancock		
Hanover		
Hanson		
Hardwick		
Harvard		
Harwich		
Hatfield		
Haverhill		
Hawley		
Heath		
Hingham		
Hinsdale		
Holbrook		
Holden		
Holland		
Holliston		
Holyoke		
Hopedale		
Hopkinton		
Hubbardston		
Hudson		
Hull		
Huntington		
Ipswich		
Kingston		
Lakeville		
Lancaster		
Lanesborough		
Lawrence		
Lee		
Leicester		
Lenox		
Leominster		
Leverett		
Lexington		
Leyden		
Lincoln		
Littleton		
Longmeadow		
Lowell		
Ludlow		
Lunenburg		
Lynn		
Lynnfield		
Malden		
Manchester-by-the-Sea		
Mansfield		
Marblehead		
Marion		
Marlborough		
Marshfield		
Mashpee		
Mattapoisett		
Maynard		
Medfield		
Medford		
Medway		
Melrose		
Mendon		
Merrimac		
Methuen		
Middleborough		
Middlefield		
Middleton		
Milford		
Millbury		
Millis		
Millville		
Milton		
Monroe		
Monson		
Montague		
Monterey		
Montgomery		
Mount Washington		
Nahant		
Nantucket		
Natick		
Needham		
New Ashford		
New Bedford		
New Braintree		
New Marlborough		
New Salem		
Newbury		
Newburyport		
Newton		
Norfolk		
North Adams		
North Andover		
North Attleborough		
North Brookfield		
North Reading		
Northampton		
Northborough		
Northbridge		
Northfield		
Norton		
Norwell		
Norwood		
Oak Bluffs		
Oakham		
Orange		
Orleans		
Otis		
Oxford		
Palmer		
Paxton		
Peabody		
Pelham		
Pembroke		
Pepperell		
Peru		
Petersham		
Phillipston		
Pittsfield		
Plainfield		
Plainville		
Plymouth		
Plympton		
Princeton		
Provincetown		
Quincy		
Randolph		
Raynham		
Reading		
Rehoboth		
Revere		
Richmond		
Rochester		
Rockland		
Rockport		
Rowe		
Rowley		
Royalston		
Russell		
Rutland		
Salem		
Salisbury		
Sandisfield		
Sandwich		
Saugus		
Savoy		
Scituate		
Seekonk		
Sharon		
Sheffield		
Shelburne		
Sherborn		
Shirley		
Shrewsbury		
Shutesbury		
Somerset		
Somerville		
South Hadley		
Southampton		
Southborough		[
Southbridge		
Southwick		
Spencer		
Springfield		
Sterling		
Stockbridge		
Stoneham		
Stoughton		
Stow		
Sturbridge		
Sudbury		
Sunderland		
Sutton		
Swampscott		
Swansea		
Taunton		
Templeton		
Tewksbury		
Tisbury		
Tolland		
Topsfield		
Townsend		
Truro		
Tyngsborough		
Tyringham		
Upton		
Uxbridge		
Wakefield		
Wales		
Walpole		
Waltham		
Ware		
Wareham		
Warren		
Warwick		
Washington		
Watertown		
Wayland		
Webster		
Wellesley		
Wellfleet		
Wendell		
Wenham		
West Boylston		
West Bridgewater		
West Brookfield		
West Newbury		
West Springfield		
West Stockbridge		
West Tisbury		
Westborough		
Westfield		
Westford		
Westhampton		
Westminster		
Weston		
Westport		
Westwood		
Weymouth		
Whately		
Whitman		
Wilbraham		
Williamsburg		
Williamstown		
Wilmington		
Winchendon		
Winchester		
Windsor		
Winthrop		
Woburn		
Worcester		
Worthington		
Wrentham		
Yarmouth		
