= 1988 United States presidential election in Massachusetts =

- November 8, 1988
- Turnout: 82.13% (▲2.38 pp)

Nominee	Michael Dukakis	George H. W. Bush
Party	Democratic	Republican
Home state	Massachusetts	Texas
Running mate	Lloyd Bentsen	Dan Quayle
Electoral vote	13	0
Popular vote	1,401,406	1,194,644
Percentage	53.23%	45.38%

Dukakis
40–50%
50–60%
60–70%
70–80%
Bush
40–50%
50–60%
60–70%
President before election
Ronald Reagan
Republican
Elected President
George H. W. Bush
Republican

The 1988 United States presidential election in Massachusetts took place on November 8, 1988, as part of the 1988 United States presidential election, which was held throughout all 50 states and Washington, D.C. Voters chose 13 representatives, or electors, to the Electoral College, who voted for president and vice president.

Massachusetts voted for Democratic nominee Michael Dukakis, the state's governor, over Republican Vice President George H. W. Bush. The Commonwealth was both candidates' birth state; 1988 was the most recent cycle in which both major party candidates have shared a birth state.

Dukakis, the sitting governor of Massachusetts, won his home state with 53.23% of the vote to Bush's 45.38%, a 7.85% margin of victory. This made it one of ten states (plus the District of Columbia) to vote for Dukakis, even though Bush won a convincing electoral victory nationwide. Massachusetts was a solid 16% more Democratic than the national average in 1988. Massachusetts had been a Democratic-leaning state since 1928, and a Democratic stronghold since 1960. Although it was already a Democratic-leaning state, this would be the last time that Republicans would be at all competitive in Massachusetts. Not only has it continued to vote Democratic in every presidential election that followed, but no Republican since has broken 40% in Massachusetts, or even won a single county or congressional district in the state.

This was also the last time that a Republican presidential nominee won any of the state's 14 counties, namely Barnstable, Plymouth, and Worcester counties. Dukakis won 11 counties in Massachusetts to Bush's three. Dukakis's strongest county was Suffolk County, home to the state's capital and largest city, Boston, where he took 64.02% of the vote. Bush's strongest county win was suburban Plymouth County, where he took 54.62% of the vote; however, Bush became the first Republican president to win the White House without carrying Franklin County and Nantucket County. Since favorite son presidential nominee John F. Kennedy won the presidency in 1960, Dukakis became the first of three major party nominees from Massachusetts to lose a presidential race. John Kerry (U.S. senator) and Mitt Romney (former governor) lost the 2004 and 2012 presidential elections, respectively.

As of 2024, this was the last time that the cities of Amesbury, Attleboro, Beverly, Braintree, Brockton, Franklin, Leominster, Marlborough, and Methuen and the towns of Abington, Alford, Auburn, Avon, Ayer, Barnstable, Bedford, Bernardston, Bolton, Boxborough, Buckland, Burlington, Canton, Carlisle, Charlemont, Chelmsford, Clinton, Cummington, Danvers, Dedham, Dennis, Erving, Essex Gosnold, Grafton, Groton, Hancock, Harvard, Harwich, Hawley, Holbrook, Holliston, Hopedale, Hudson, Ipswich, Littleton, Longmeadow, Manchester-by-the-Sea, Mansfield, Marblehead, Marion, Mattapoisett, Medway, Milton, Mount Washington, Needham, New Ashford, New Salem, Newbury, Northborough, Norton, Peru, Petersham, Plymouth, Reading, Savoy, Sheffield, Shelburne, Shirley, Shrewsbury, Southborough, Southampton, Stow, Sudbury, Wakefield, Wellesley, West Newbury, Westborough, Westford, Westhampton, Weston, Winchester, Windsor, and Yarmouth voted Republican.

== Results ==
1988 United States presidential election in Massachusetts
Party	Candidate	Votes	Percentage	Electoral votes
Democratic	Michael Dukakis	1,401,406	53.23%	13
Republican	George H. W. Bush	1,194,644	45.38%	0
Libertarian	Ron Paul	24,251	0.92%	0
New Alliance	Lenora Fulani	9,561	0.36%	0
Write-ins	Write-ins	2,910	0.11%	0
Prohibition (write-in)	Earl Dodge	18	0.00%	0
Socialist (write-in)	Willa Kenoyer	15	0.00%	0
Totals		2,632,805	100.00%	13
Voter turnout (voting age/registered)				58%/80%

=== Results by congressional district ===
Dukakis won 9 of 11 congressional districts, including the 1st district, which simultaneously elected Republican Silvio O. Conte to the House of Representatives. Bush won the 3rd and 5th districts, which simultaneously elected Democrats to the House.

District	Bush	Dukakis	Representative
1st	41%	58%	Silvio O. Conte
2nd	47%	52%	Edward Boland
2nd	47%	52%	Richard Neal
3rd	50%	49%	Joseph D. Early
4th	42%	57%	Barney Frank
5th	51%	47%	Chester G. Atkins
6th	48%	50%	Nicholas Mavroules
7th	45%	53%	Ed Markey
8th	33%	66%	Joseph P. Kennedy II
9th	45%	54%	Joe Moakley
10th	48%	51%	Gerry Studds
11th	47%	51%	Brian J. Donnelly

=== Results by county ===
County	Michael Dukakis Democratic		George H.W. Bush Republican		Various candidates Other parties		Margin		Total votes cast
County	#	%	#	%	#	%	#	%	Total votes cast
Barnstable	48,747	48.81%	49,676	49.74%	1,449	1.45%	-929	-0.93%	99,872
Berkshire	38,208	60.78%	24,125	38.38%	526	0.84%	14,083	22.40%	62,859
Bristol	107,854	55.73%	83,797	43.30%	1,879	0.97%	24,057	12.43%	193,530
Dukes	4,495	63.99%	2,441	34.75%	89	1.26%	2,054	29.24%	7,025
Essex	151,816	49.69%	148,614	48.65%	5,070	1.66%	3,202	1.04%	305,500
Franklin	19,310	58.30%	13,475	40.68%	338	1.02%	5,835	17.62%	33,123
Hampden	97,332	56.13%	74,872	43.17%	1,216	0.70%	22,460	12.96%	173,420
Hampshire	39,834	61.36%	24,331	37.48%	750	1.16%	15,503	23.88%	64,915
Middlesex	361,563	54.57%	290,352	43.82%	10,713	1.61%	71,211	10.75%	662,628
Nantucket	2,209	59.21%	1,469	39.37%	53	1.42%	740	19.84%	3,731
Norfolk	160,289	50.88%	150,306	47.71%	4,461	1.41%	9,983	3.17%	315,056
Plymouth	84,587	43.72%	105,684	54.62%	3,209	1.66%	-21,097	-10.90%	193,480
Suffolk	143,677	64.02%	77,137	34.37%	3,596	1.61%	66,540	29.65%	224,410
Worcester	141,485	48.25%	148,365	50.59%	3,406	1.16%	-6,880	-2.34%	293,256
Totals	1,401,415	53.23%	1,194,635	45.37%	36,755	1.40%	206,780	7.86%	2,632,805

==== Counties that flipped from Republican to Democratic ====
- Berkshire
- Essex
- Franklin
- Hampden
- Nantucket
- Norfolk

== See also ==
- Presidency of George H. W. Bush
- United States presidential elections in Massachusetts
