= Arms Academy =

Coordinates: 42.6299°N 72.746°W

- Shelburne, Massachusetts, U.S.

Information
- Type: Public high school
- Established: 1884

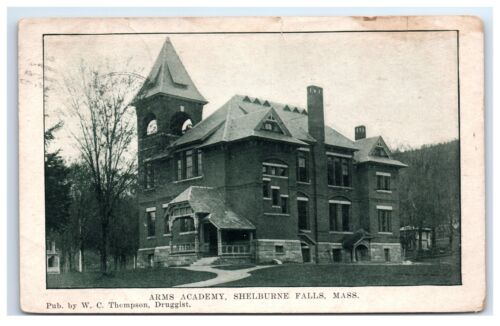
A photo postcard showing the Arms Academy building

Arms Academy was a public school located in Shelburne, Massachusetts, United States. Named after Major Ira Arms, construction commenced following a gift of land and $20,000. Initially dedicated as a private school in 1880, Shelburne voters made it a public school in 1894. The final class graduated in 1967, prior to the establishment of nearby Mohawk Trail Regional High School. "Students from Rowe, Colrain, Buckland, Shelbourne, and other hilltowns" attended the school, according to a member of the class of 1967 who spoke with the local Greenfield Recorder. Other non-local students also attended the school. At the time the school closed, its last class was 65 graduates.

Today, the building houses the Shelburne Historical Society.
