= Kenneth Dubuque Memorial State Forest =

Protected area in Massachusetts, United States

- Location within Massachusetts Location within the United States
- Location: Hawley, Plainfield and Savoy, Massachusetts, United States
- Coordinates: 42°32′58″N 72°56′42″W
- Area: 7,405 acres (2,997 ha)
- Elevation: 1,601 ft (488 m)
- Administrator: Massachusetts Department of Conservation and Recreation
- Website: Official website

Kenneth Dubuque Memorial State Forest is a Massachusetts state forest in the northern Berkshire Hills in the towns of Hawley, Plainfield, and Savoy. The forest is managed by the Department of Conservation and Recreation (DCR). In 1985, the forest was named in memory of Kenneth M. Dubuque, a former employee of the Department of Environmental Management.

== Activities and amenities ==
- Trails: Some 35 miles (56 km) of trails are designated for mixed use including horseback riding, mountain biking, cross-country skiing, and snowmobiling. In addition, there are 6 miles (9.7 km) of hiking trails and a one-mile interpretive trail encircling Hallockville Pond. Two small shelters may be found along the trails.
- Artifacts: Historical artifacts in the forest include cellar holes of abandoned South Hawley village, an unusual beehive-shaped fieldstone charcoal kiln, and the remains of a mill complex at Hallockville Pond.
- The forest also features wilderness camping, canoeing, fishing, and restricted hunting.
- The Massachusetts Student Conservation Association–AmeriCorps program is headquartered at Hallockville Pond.

The effects of Hurricane Irene resulted in the forest's closure in 2011. As of 2014, road conditions were deemed to be safe for travel "in most areas."

== See also ==
- List of Massachusetts state forests
