= Charlemont High School =

Charlemont High School may refer to:

In the USA

- Hawlemont Regional Elementary School, Charlemont, Massachusetts

Elsewhere

- Charlemont High School, Jamaica
