= Mohawk Trail Regional High School =

Mohawk Trail Regional School
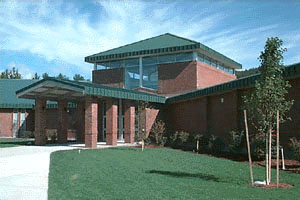

Location
- 26 Ashfield Rd; Buckland, Massachusetts 01370; United States; 42°38′38.62″N 72°45′15.16″W

Information
- Type: Public; High School; Open enrollment
- Established: 1967
- School district: Mohawk Trail Regional School District
- Superintendent: Sheryl Stanton
- Principal: Chris Buckland
- Grades: 7–12
- Enrollment: 299 (2023-2024)
- Colors: Blue and Gold
- Nickname: Warriors
- Communities served: Ashfield, Buckland, Charlemont, Colrain, Hawley, Heath, Plainfield, Rowe Shelburne
- Website: mtrs.mohawktrailschools.org

Mohawk Trail Regional School is a school located on Route 112 in Buckland, Massachusetts, United States. The public school currently serves grades 7–12 for nine towns: Ashfield, Buckland, Charlemont, Colrain, Hawley, Heath, Plainfield, Rowe and Shelburne.

== History ==
Mohawk opened in September 1967, at a construction cost of $2,705,000. Previously, middle school and high school students from western Franklin County, Massachusetts had attended smaller schools, including Sanderson Academy in Ashfield, Charlemont High School in Charlemont, Arms Academy in Shelburne, and Crittenden Junior High School in Buckland.

== Administration ==
Mohawk Trail Regional School is led by principal Chris Buckland.
