= Eliot Greenwald =

Eliot Greenwald (born 1983, Portland, Maine) is a self taught artist currently based in Ashfield, Massachusetts. Greenwald is prominently known for his Night Car series, which depicts deceptively simple compositions of sci-fi, psychedelic Americana landscapes of a car in motion, yet suspended in time. Crafted by hand, the amorphous shape of his artworks adds to the surreal nature of his subject matter, giving them the appearance of a cartoon-like dream bubble. Through painting, sculpture, and assemblage, Greenwald utilizes a highly saturated color palette to emphasize the uncertainty of time and explore the spiritual force of objects.

Greenwald's artistic practice blends comical futurism with an underlying residue of static energy; one dedicated to an individual quest of traveling without meeting a destination. His artworks find resonance with shows like “The Twilight Zone” and “Black Mirror,” where the use of the sci-fi genre critiques societal fears of the postmodern, existentialist self in the age of technology and escapism.

== Early life ==
Eliot Greenwald came from a family of openly creative people. His mother made clothing for the family, his father played instruments, his older sister painted, his grandfather built model boats, and his grandmother influenced his consistent interaction with nature. Greenwald decided to become an artist around the age of seven. He recalled a time where he concocted the idea to sell dirt, hamburger cookies, and natural geographic magazines to sell at his parents’ garage sale. The dirt sold within two hours, and although Greenwald retold the story from a place of excitement, it was later revealed that his mother convinced a stranger to purchase Greenwald's display. His mother's actions did not deter Greenwald from embracing an artistic livelihood, instead it crystallized the importance of community to artistic development and patronage.
