= Hawlemont Regional Elementary School =

School in Massachusetts, United States

Coordinates: 42°37′38.72″N 72°52′26.05″W

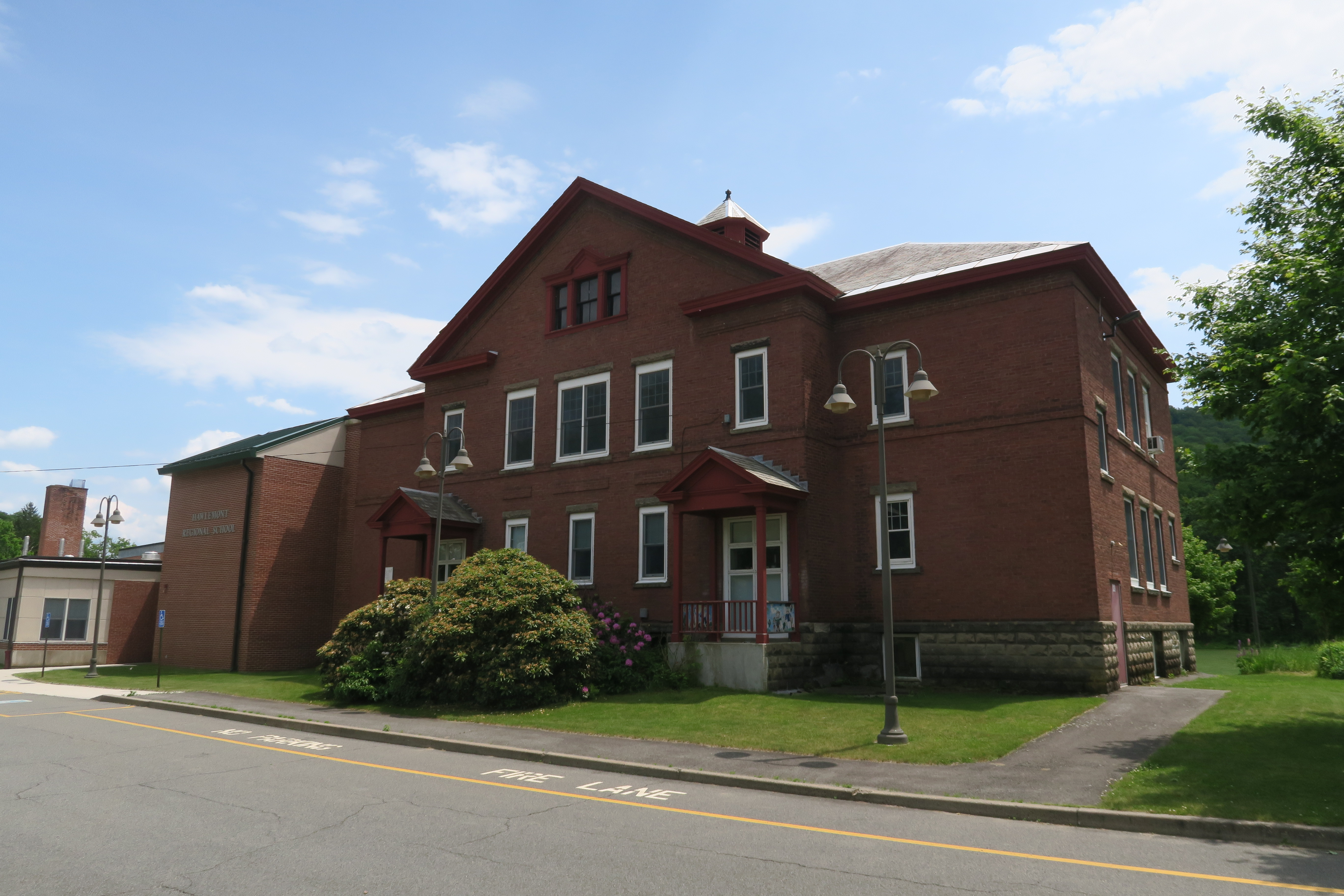
Hawlemont Regional Elementary School

Hawlemont Regional Elementary School is a public elementary school located in Charlemont, Massachusetts, United States. The school's name is a portmanteau derived from the two towns it serves, Hawley and Charlemont. In addition to those two towns, students from other nearby towns attend Hawlemont via school choice.

== History ==
The three-story building located on the west side of the present-day facility was originally the site of the Charlemont High School, which closed when Mohawk Trail Regional High School opened in nearby Buckland, Massachusetts. The east side of the present day facility was constructed a few years before this transition and has housed the elementary school ever since.

Starting in 1981, the Academy at Charlemont, a private middle and high school, was housed in the former Charlemont High School building for nearly a decade. Due to an increasing student population at Hawlemont, the Academy at Charlemont's lease was terminated by the Town of Charlemont, leading to the building being incorporated into the elementary school. During the transition, Hawlemont maintained a classroom in the present day Post Office building west of campus, calling it Hawlemont West.

The original high school and elementary school buildings were connected as part of a large renovation project starting around 2000. At the height of this project in 2001, the elementary school was temporarily housed at nearby Berkshire East Ski Resort.
