= Mary Phylinda Dole =

American physician

- Born: August 31, 1862; Shelburne, Massachusetts
- Died: February 23, 1947 (aged 84); Shelburne, Massachusetts
- Education: Mount Holyoke College
- Occupation: physician

Mary Phylinda Dole (August 31, 1862 – February 23, 1947) was an American physician who practiced medicine in New England and was the first to earn a bachelor's degree at Mount Holyoke College. She is thought to be the first female physician to have practiced at Franklin County Public Hospital, now known as Baystate Franklin Medical Center.

== Early life and education ==
Mary Phylinda Dole was born in 1862 to George Carpenter Dole, a farmer, and Philinda Field Dole in Shelburne, Massachusetts. After the deaths of both parents, in 1871 she moved to live with a relative in Ashfield, Massachusetts, where she attended a local school and then Sanderson Academy. She attended Mount Holyoke Female Seminary between 1881 and 1884 before graduating in 1886. Dole then studied medicine at the Women's Medical College of Baltimore from 1886 to 1888, earning her M.D. in just two years. She attended Mount Holyoke again, now Mount Holyoke College, from 1888 to 1889 after the school received its college charter and became the first graduate to complete a Bachelor of Science degree there. Dole spent additional time studying at the Pasteur Institute in Paris, France and visited medical clinics in Berlin and Dresden, Germany from 1894 to 1896.

Mary Phylinda Dole named a number of influences in her life and career, including Marie Elizabeth Zakrzewska, her mentor Cornelia Clapp, and Elizabeth Blackwell.

== Medical practice ==
After graduating from Mount Holyoke College, Dole practiced medicine for a short time in Shelburne Falls, MA before accepting an internship and working at the New England Hospital for Women and Children in Boston until 1891. At that time, she opened a private practice in the Hovey House, which is now the Greenfield Public Library in Greenfield, Massachusetts. Dole supported Mount Holyoke College as a trustee from 1901 to 1907, and remained involved in the college community for many years. She served as a traveling "country doctor" to the area until she moved to New Haven, Connecticut in 1906 and established a new practice. She moved back to Massachusetts in 1919 and practiced medicine in Northampton until 1927.

== Later life ==
Dole's career was cut short by health issues, and she retired from medicine in 1927 at age 65. She began a secondary career in hand-weaving, and became successful in this field as well. She worked with the Deerfield Society of Blue and White Needlework. Dole used the funds obtained from selling her work to create a fellowship to support the education of female medical students at Mount Holyoke. The scholarship exists today as the Dr. Mary P. Dole Medical Fellowship. Funds for the scholarship were also provided by the sale of her autobiography. Dole died in her home in Shelburne in 1947 and is buried in the East Shelburne Cemetery.

== Honors ==
In 1902, Dole was elected as a member of the Franklin District Medical Society.

She was President of the Mount Holyoke Club of Franklin County and Honorary President of the Mount Holyoke Club of New Haven

In 1937, she became one of the fourteen first recipients of Mount Holyoke College's Medal of Honor for her service to the college as an alumna.

== Autobiography ==
She privately published her autobiography, A Doctor in Homespun, in 1941. It chronicles her life and her medical practice, focusing on her time as a "country doctor".
