= Hawley, Massachusetts =

- Town
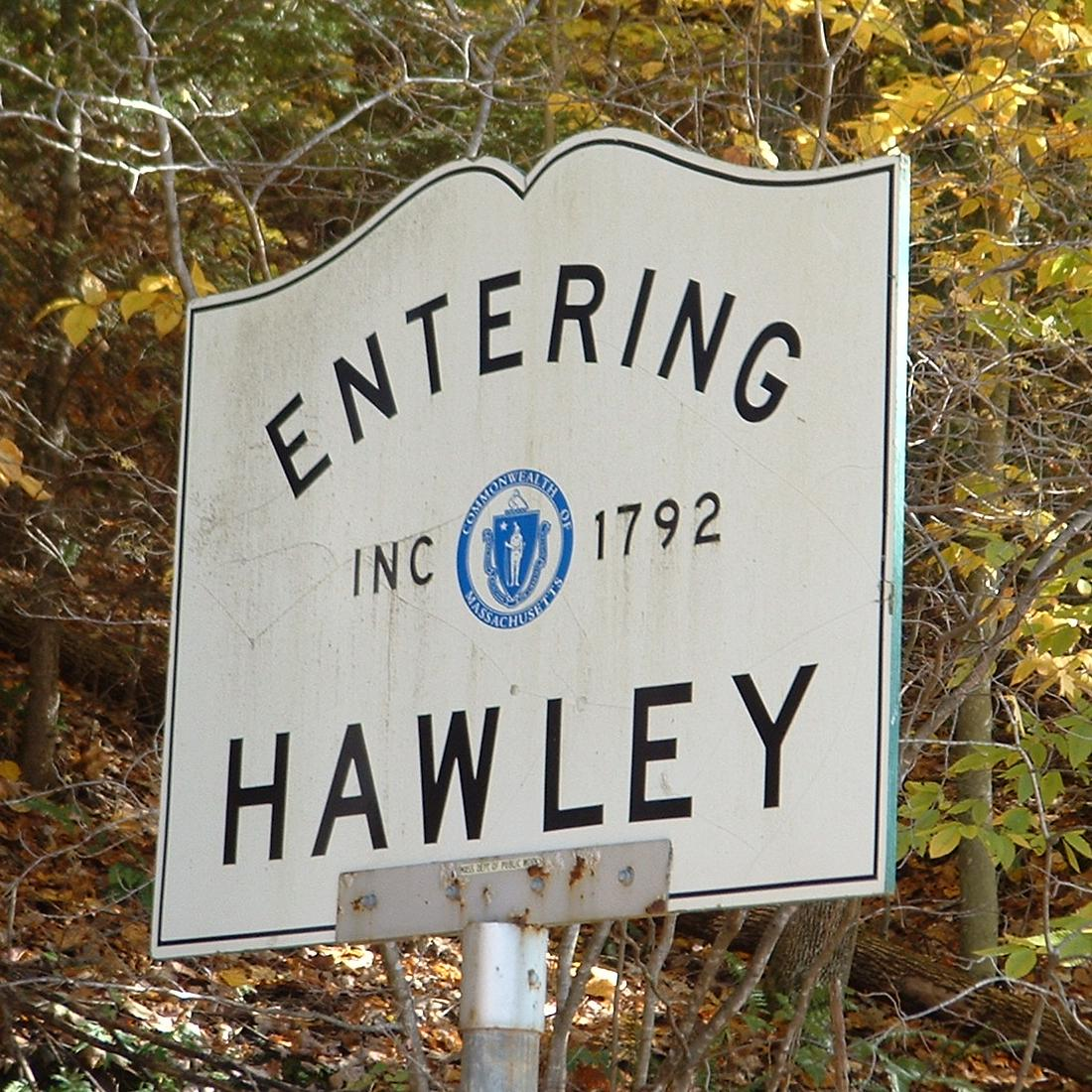
- Entering Hawley

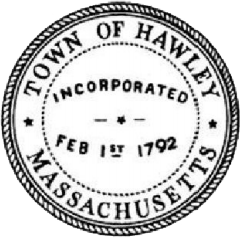
- Seal

- Location in Franklin County in Massachusetts
- Coordinates: 42°34′N 72°53′W
- Country: United States
- State: Massachusetts
- County: Franklin
- Settled: 1760
- Incorporated: 1792

Government
  - Type: Open town meeting

Area
  - Total: 30.9 sq mi (80.0 km^{2})
  - Land: 30.8 sq mi (79.9 km^{2})
  - Water: 0.039 sq mi (0.1 km^{2})
- Elevation: 1,404 ft (428 m)

Population (2020)
  - Total: 353
  - Density: 11.4/sq mi (4.42/km^{2})
- Time zone: UTC-5 (Eastern)
  - Summer (DST): UTC-4 (Eastern)
- ZIP code: 01339
- Area code: 413
- FIPS code: 25-29475
- GNIS feature ID: 0619380
- Website: www.townofhawley.com

Hawley is a town in Franklin County, Massachusetts, United States. The population was 353 at the 2020 census. It is part of the Springfield, Massachusetts Metropolitan Statistical Area.

== History ==
Hawley was first settled in 1760 as Plantation Number 7, by a group from Hatfield. The town was called the "Hatfield Reserve" until it was officially incorporated in 1792. The town was named for Joseph Hawley of Northampton, a local leader in the American Revolution. Hawley's main industries were forestry and, eventually, recreation. The town originally included the land of its neighbor, Plainfield, which split off in the early nineteenth century.

Today, the town has very little industry. There are a few remaining farms, artisans and small businesses, though most people commute from the town, work from home or work for municipalities. The town has no gas stations, convenience stores, or liquor stores. Hawley does not have a police department, but does have a fire department.

== Geography ==
According to the United States Census Bureau, the town has a total area of 30.9 square miles (80 km^{2}), of which 30.9 square miles (80 km^{2}) is land and 0.04 square miles (0.10 km^{2}) (0.06%) is water. The town is located at the southwestern corner of Franklin County, with Hampshire County to the south and Berkshire County to the west. The town is bordered by Charlemont to the north, Buckland to the east, Ashfield to the southeast, Plainfield to the south, and Savoy to the west. Hawley is located 22 miles (35 km) west of Greenfield, 45 miles (72 km) north-northwest of Springfield, and 110 miles (180 km) west-northwest of Boston.

Hawley is located among the northern Berkshires, with the northern edge of town falling to the valley of the Deerfield River. Several brooks and the Chickley River flow into the river through town. The town is home to Hawley Bog, one of the few bogs in Massachusetts to be preserved in its natural state. There are several small peaks in town, with the highest being Parker Hill to the south. The hill lies within Kenneth Dubuque Memorial State Forest, which has several recreation sites for all seasons. Mohawk Trail State Forest also extends into the town from Charlemont and Savoy, in the northwest corner of town. Between the two forests lies Stump Sprout Cross-Country Ski Area, which also provides other recreational activities off-season. A portion of Berkshire East Ski Area also lies within town, with the base of the area being in Charlemont.

The main road through town is Massachusetts Route 8A, which connects Route 116 to the south with Route 2 to the north. Route 2, the Mohawk Trail, passes just north of the town line for most of the town border. The nearest interstate, Interstate 91, can be accessed in nearby Greenfield. There is no rail, air or bus service in town. The town is roughly equidistant from the two nearest points for rail and air service, Greenfield and North Adams. The nearest Amtrak service is in Pittsfield, and the nearest national air service is at Bradley International Airport in Windsor Locks, Connecticut.

=== Climate ===
Hawley has a humid continental climate (Köppen Dfb).

Climate data for East Hawley, Massachusetts, 1991–2020 normals: 1,647 feet (502 m)
Month	Jan	Feb	Mar	Apr	May	Jun	Jul	Aug	Sep	Oct	Nov	Dec	Year
Mean daily maximum °F (°C)	28.2 (−2.1)	31.0 (−0.6)	39.4 (4.1)	51.3 (10.7)	62.6 (17.0)	70.1 (21.2)	74.8 (23.8)	74.1 (23.4)	67.5 (19.7)	55.5 (13.1)	44.6 (7.0)	33.9 (1.1)	52.8 (11.5)
Daily mean °F (°C)	18.7 (−7.4)	20.9 (−6.2)	29.0 (−1.7)	40.7 (4.8)	51.3 (10.7)	60.2 (15.7)	64.1 (17.8)	63.1 (17.3)	56.6 (13.7)	45.0 (7.2)	35.8 (2.1)	25.8 (−3.4)	42.6 (5.9)
Mean daily minimum °F (°C)	9.2 (−12.7)	10.7 (−11.8)	18.6 (−7.4)	30.0 (−1.1)	40.0 (4.4)	50.2 (10.1)	53.4 (11.9)	52.1 (11.2)	45.6 (7.6)	34.5 (1.4)	26.9 (−2.8)	17.6 (−8.0)	32.4 (0.2)
Source: NOAA

== Demographics ==
Historical population
Year	Pop.	±%
1790	539	—
1850	881	+63.5%
1860	671	−23.8%
1870	672	+0.1%
1880	592	−11.9%
1890	515	−13.0%
1900	429	−16.7%
1910	424	−1.2%
1920	390	−8.0%
1930	313	−19.7%
1940	257	−17.9%
1950	244	−5.1%
1960	251	+2.9%
1970	224	−10.8%
1980	280	+25.0%
1990	317	+13.2%
2000	336	+6.0%
2010	337	+0.3%
2020	353	+4.7%
2024*	352	−0.3%
Source: United States census records and Population Estimates Program data.

As of the census of 2000, there were 336 people, 137 households, and 99 families residing in the town. By population, Hawley ranks 25th out of the 26 towns in Franklin County, and 347th out of 351 cities and towns in Massachusetts. The population density was 10.9 inhabitants per square mile (4.2/km^{2}), which ranked 25th in the county and 348th in the Commonwealth. There were 192 housing units at an average density of 6.2 per square mile (2.4/km^{2}). The racial makeup of the town was 97.32% White, 0.30% African American, 0.89% Asian, and 1.49% from two or more races. Hispanic or Latino of any race were 0.30% of the population.

There were 137 households, out of which 29.9% had children under the age of 18 living with them, 62.0% were married couples living together, 6.6% had a female householder with no husband present, and 27.7% were non-families. 21.2% of all households were made up of individuals, and 6.6% had someone living alone who was 65 years of age or older. The average household size was 2.45 and the average family size was 2.85.

In the town, the population was spread out, with 23.5% under the age of 18, 3.0% from 18 to 24, 26.5% from 25 to 44, 32.1% from 45 to 64, and 14.9% who were 65 years of age or older. The median age was 44 years. For every 100 females, there were 108.7 males. For every 100 females age 18 and over, there were 100.8 males.

The median income for a household in the town was $38,125, and the median income for a family was $46,875. Males had a median income of $30,833 versus $23,750 for females. The per capita income for the town was $17,333. About 11.8% of families and 14.2% of the population were below the poverty line, including 14.3% of those under age 18 and 6.7% of those age 65 or over.

== Government ==
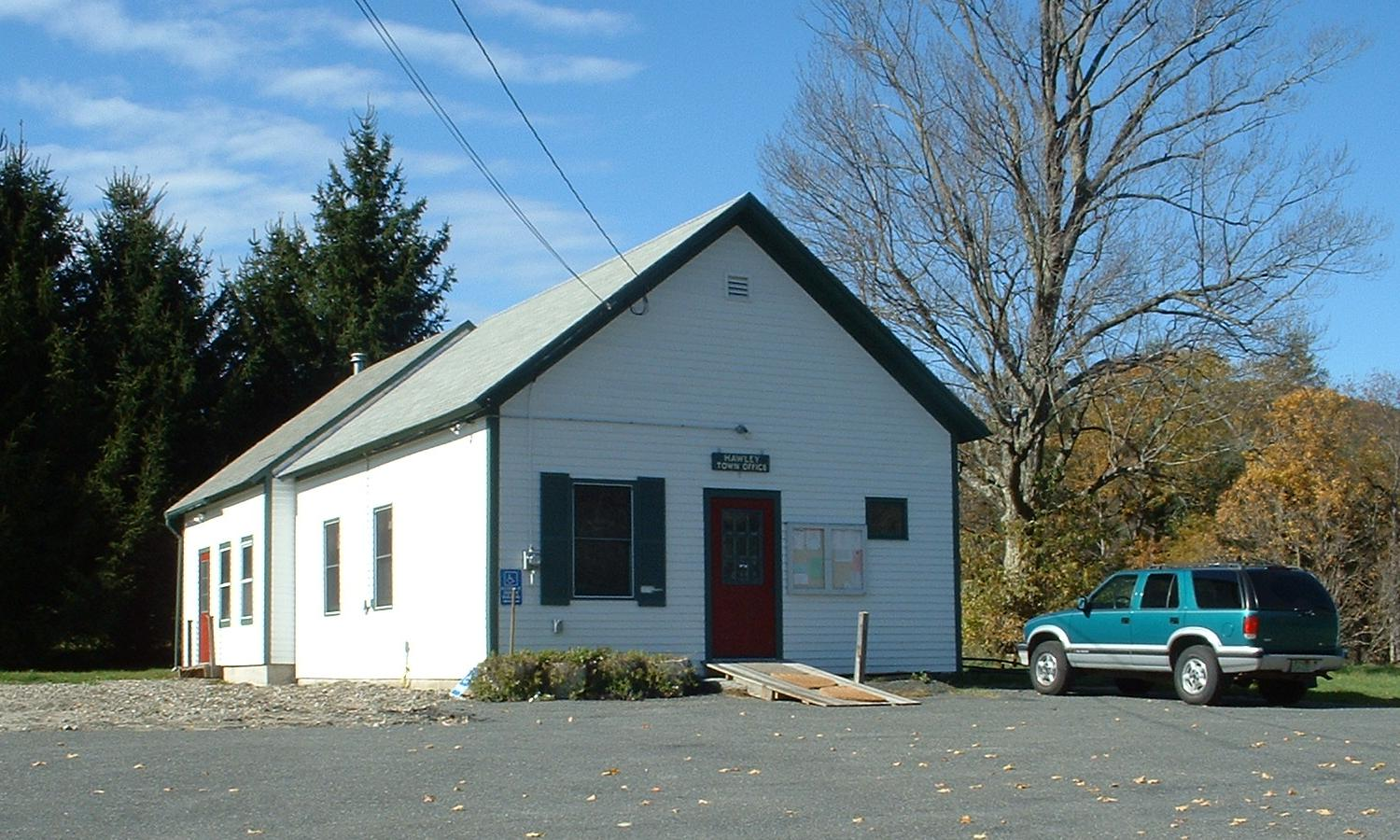
Hawley Town Hall

Hawley employs the open town meeting form of government, and is led by a board of selectmen and an administrative assistant. The town only has two full-time employees with most being part-time or volunteer, as in the case with the fire department and emergency services. There is no library or post office in Hawley; neighboring Charlemont provides these services. The nearest hospitals are in Greenfield and North Adams.

On the state level, Hawley is represented in the Massachusetts House of Representatives as part of the Second Berkshire district, represented by Paul Mark, which covers central Berkshire County, as well as portions of Hampshire and Franklin Counties. In the Massachusetts Senate, the town is part of the Berkshire, Hampshire and Franklin district, represented by Ben Downing, which includes all of Berkshire County and the western portions of Hampshire and Franklin Counties. The town is patrolled by the Second (Shelburne Falls) Station of Troop "B" of the Massachusetts State Police.

On the national level, Hawley is represented in the United States House of Representatives as part of Massachusetts's 1st congressional district, and has been represented by Richard Neal of Springfield since January 2013. Massachusetts is currently represented in the United States Senate by Senators Elizabeth Warren and Ed Markey.

== Education ==
Hawley and neighboring Charlemont make up the Hawlemont Regional School District, a sub-district of the nine-town Mohawk Trail Regional School District, which serves much of western Franklin County. Town students attend the Hawlemont Regional Elementary School in Charlemont from pre-kindergarten through sixth grades, and all students in the district attend Mohawk Trail Regional High School in Buckland. There is a private academy, the Academy at Charlemont, in Charlemont as well, and other private and religious schools are in nearby towns.

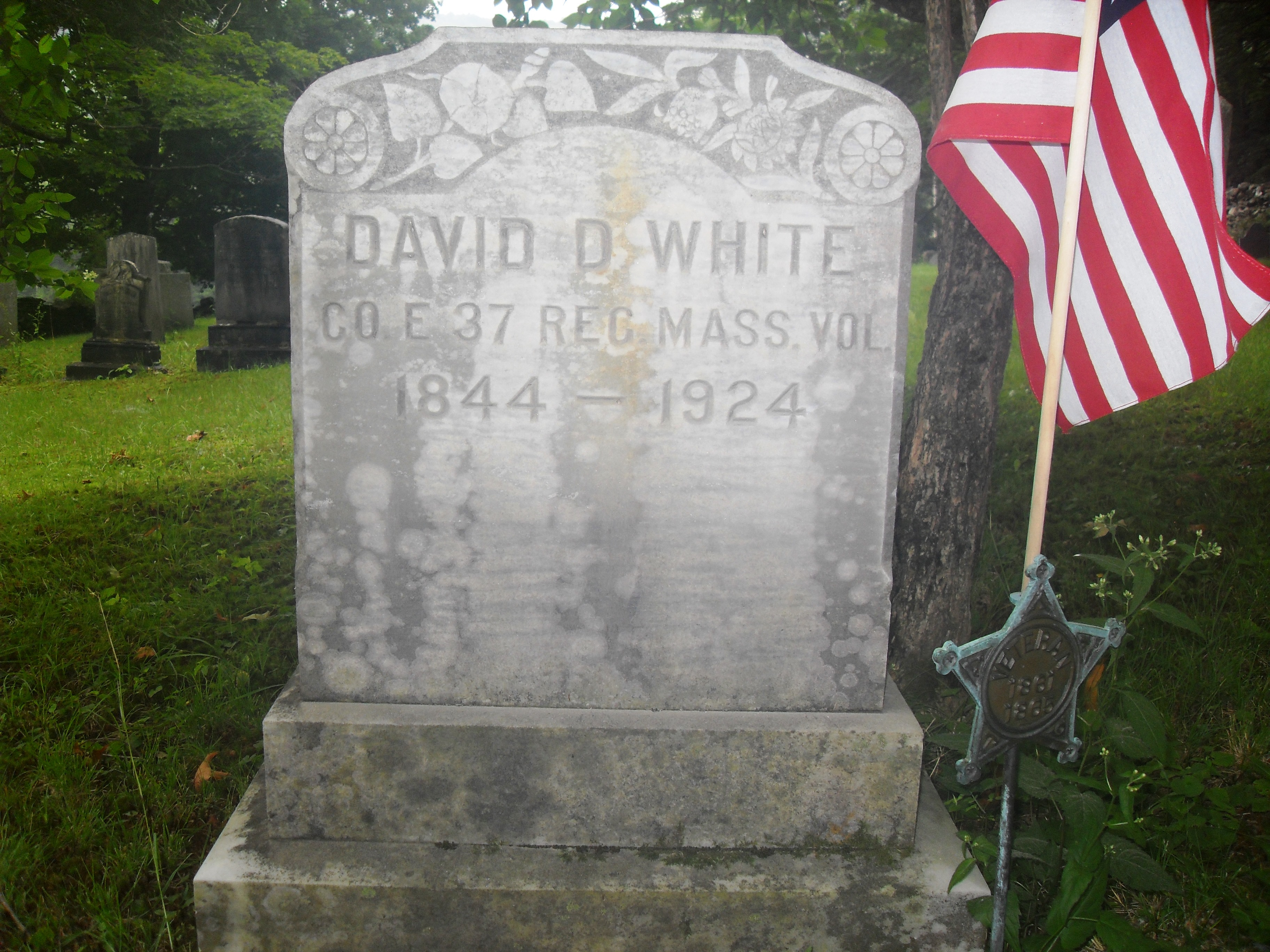
David Dunnels White's Tombstone, in Bozrah Cemetery, East Hawley, Massachusetts...Medal of Honor Nominee...Civil War

The nearest community college, Greenfield Community College, is located in Greenfield. The nearest state college is Massachusetts College of Liberal Arts in North Adams, and the nearest state university is the University of Massachusetts Amherst. The nearest private college is Williams College in Williamstown, with several others located southeast in the Northampton area.

== Notable people ==
- David Dunnels White, Medal of Honor nominee, for the capture of Major General Custis Lee, son of Robert E. Lee, at the Battle of Sailor's Creek, Virginia on April 6, 1865. He is buried in the Bozrah cemetery in East Hawley.
- Alice Parker, composer
