= Martha J. Lamb =

American author and editor (1826–1893)

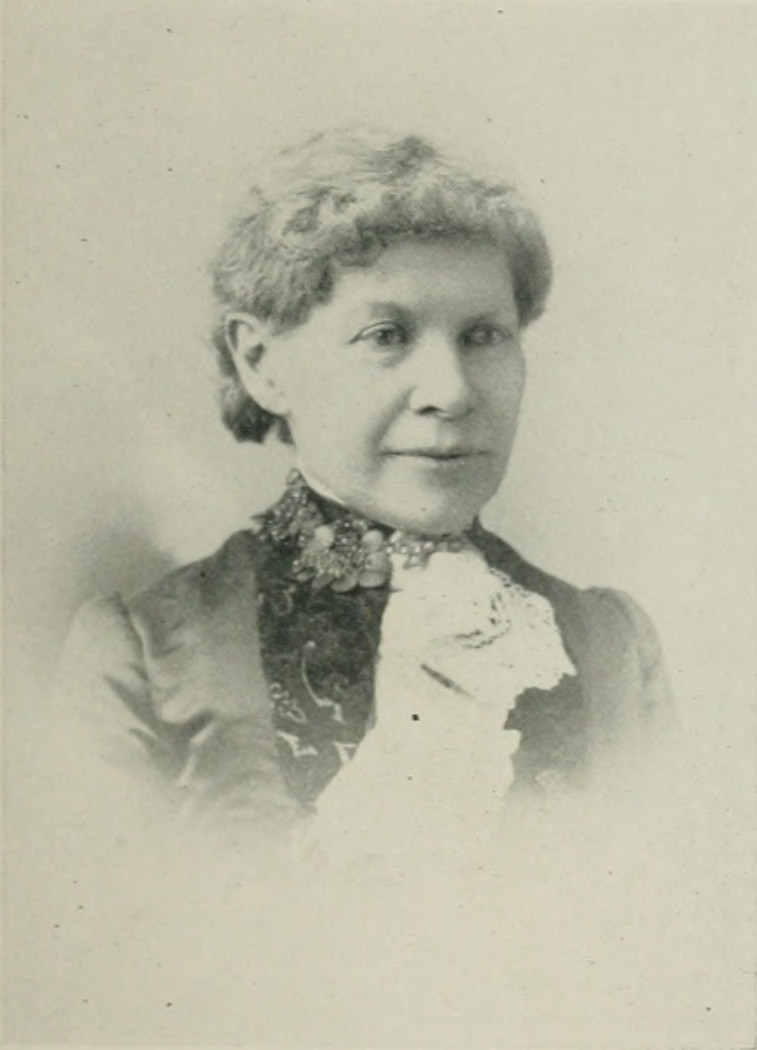
- "A Woman of the Century"
- Born: August 13, 1826; Plainfield, Massachusetts
- Died: January 2, 1893 (aged 66); New York, New York
- Spouse: Charles A. Lamb (m. 1852; div. 1866)

Signature
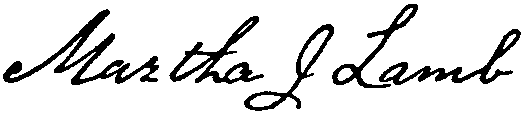

Martha Joanna Reade Nash Lamb (August 13, 1826 – January 2, 1893) was an American author, editor and historian.

== Early life ==
Martha J. Nash was born in Plainfield, Massachusetts on August 13, 1826, the third of the four children of Arvin Nash and Lucinda Vinton. Her mother died when Martha was a child and her father remarried and with his second wife had two more children. Martha Nash was educated at several schools in Massachusetts: in Goshen, at the Williston Seminary in Easthampton (1844–45), and at the Northampton High School. She did especially well in mathematics and taught that subject at schools in Newark, New Jersey and Maumee, Ohio.

On September 8, 1852 she married Charles A. Lamb in Maumee. He was a mechanic who had two daughters from an earlier marriage. The Lambs moved to Chicago in 1857 and Martha became involved in charity work. She was a founder, with Jane C. Hoge, of the Home for the Friendless and the Half-Orphan Asylum. In 1863 she served as secretary of Chicago's first Sanitary Fair, held to raise money for soldiers' relief. That same year, she served as secretary to the United States Sanitary Commission Fair.

== Literary career ==
Lamb published her first article, "A Visit to My Mother's Birthplace", in her local newspaper, The Daily Hampshire Gazette, in Northampton, Massachusetts in 1847.

Her marriage ended by divorce around 1866, and it became necessary for her to support herself financially. She moved to New York City and acted upon her belief that a woman "with any brains or any sort of intellectual capacity" should work at a significant occupation.

She published a series of children's stories in 1869 and 1870. In the 1870s she also wrote Spicy, a romance novel featuring the Sanitary Fair and the Chicago Fire; several Christmas annuals; and articles on a wide array of subjects for Harper's and other periodicals. She also edited The Homes of America. In the course of this writing she realized writing history was her true calling and she began extensive research for History of the City of New York: Its Origin, Rise, and Progress. The first volume on the colonial period was published in 1877; the second volume appeared in 1880. Although she was not trained as a professional historian and favored a narrative rather than analytical approach, her work was praised by the renowned contemporary historian, George Bancroft.

In 1883, Lamb purchased the Magazine of American History, a financially struggling monthly founded in 1877. She devoted herself to editing the magazine for the last decade of her life, producing over fifty signed articles and more that were unsigned. She also published articles by others, original documents, book reviews, and other standard components of a professional historical journal at a time when there was little precedent for such an endeavor. The magazine ceased publication shortly after Lamb's death in 1893.

Lamb was elected to membership in fifteen historical and learned societies in the United States and Europe.

Lamb was a fixture in New York social circles; she had connections with many of the old families she chronicled in her historical writings. She also belonged to numerous historical and patriotic societies. She was twice invited to the White House: President Grover Cleveland gave a dinner in her honor in 1886; in 1889 President Benjamin Harrison recognized her contributions to the centennial celebration of Washington's inauguration with an invitation.

== Works ==
- The Play School Studies (4 vols., Boston, 1869)
- Aunt Mattie's Library, a series of books for children including: "Merry Christmas," "Drifting Goodword," "Fun and Profit" and "Sabbath Schools." (4 vols., Boston, 1871)
- Spicy, chronicles the great Chicago fire (New York, 1873)
- Harper's Magazine, 1876:
  - "Lyme, A Chapter of American Genealogy"
  - "Newark," a complete sketch of that city
  - "Tombs of Old Trinity"
- "State and Society in Washington," Harper's Magazine, Volume 56, Issue 334 (March 1878), pp. 481–500.
- "The Coast Survey," Harper's Magazine, 1879
- The Homes of America (New York, 1879)
- Memorial of Dr. J. D. Russ, a philanthropist (New York, 1880)
- The Christmas Owl: A Budget of Entertainment, editor, collection of poems shaped like an owl (New York, 1881)
- The Christmas Basket Holiday Entertainment, editor, shaped like an basket (New York, 1882)
- Snow and Sunshine (New York, 1882)
- "The American Life Saving Service," Harper's Magazine, 1882
- "Historical Sketch of New York," for the Tenth United States Census, 1883
- Wall Street in History (New York, 1883)
- Magazine of American History, 1884
  - "Unsuccessful Candidates for the Presidency of the Nation"
  - "The Van Rensselaer Manor"
- Magazine of American History, 1885
  - "The Framers of the Constitution"
  - "The Manor of Gardiner's Island"
  - "Sketch of Major-General John A. Dix"
- Magazine of American History, 1886
  - "The Van Cortlandt Manor House"
  - "Historic Homes in Lafayette Place"
  - "The Founder, Presidents and Homes of the New York Historical Society"
- Magazine of American History, 1887
  - "The Historic Homes of our Presidents"
  - "Historic Homes on Golden Hills"
  - "The Manor of Shelter Island"
- Magazine of American History, 1888
  - "Foundation of Civil Government beyond the Ohio River, 1788-1888"
  - "The Inauguration of Washington in 1789," written by special request of the New York Historical Society
- Magazine of American History, 1889
  - "Historic Homes and Landmarks in New York," three papers
  - "The Story of the Washington Centennial"
- Magazine of American History, 1890
  - "America's Congress of Historical Scholars"
  - "Our South American Neighbors"
  - "American Outgrowths of Continental Europe"
  - "The Golden Age of Colonial New York"
- "Formative Influences," The Forum, 1890
- Magazine of American History, 1891
  - "William H. Seward, a Great Public Character"
  - "Glimpses of the Railroad in History"
  - "The Royal Society of Canada"
  - "Some Interesting Facts about Electricity"
  - "A Group of Columbus Portraits"
  - "Judge Charles Johnson McCurdy"
- Magazine of American History, 1892
  - "The Walters Collection of Art Treasures"
  - "Progression of Steam Navigation, 1807-1892"
- The History of the City of New York: Its Origin, Rise, and Progress. (2 vols.) 1877-81 (her most noted work, the product of about fifteen years of patient labor and research)

She wrote about 50 shorter stories, and more than 100 historical and other papers in magazines.

== Death ==
Martha Lamb died of pneumonia in New York on January 2, 1893. Her funeral service was held at the Madison Square Presbyterian Church and she was buried in Spring Grove Cemetery in Florence, Massachusetts.
