= Howes Brothers =

The Howes Brothers were early entrants into the world of commercial photography who enjoyed a vibrant career in the years after the American Civil War.

Growing up in Ashfield, Massachusetts, the oldest brother, Alvah, born 1853, was the first to take up photography sometime in the mid-1880s after time spent as a farm laborer. He brought his brother Walter into the profession and together they began taking and selling photographs in southern New England and the Hudson Valley. In 1888 they set up a studio in Turners Falls, Massachusetts, and occasionally employed their youngest sibling, George.

In the summers, Walter and George toured, settling in a town for a week or more, taking photographs and selling the prints at three for a dollar. Alvah, on the other hand, ran the Turners Falls studio, staying there until 1894 when his business collapsed, a victim of the Depression of 1893. In 1896 Alvah returned to photography and joined his brothers on the road.

They took pictures across New England, particularly in Massachusetts, Connecticut and Rhode Island. They specialized in selling affordable, easily produced photographs, creating a record of the lives of ordinary people, many of whom would never have had a formal studio photograph taken. By 1902 the brothers decided to end their touring life.

The last photographs known by Alvah were in 1906 or 1907; he died in Ashfield in 1919. Walter and George moved to other business ventures. George died in 1925, and Walter in 1945. The Howes brothers took more than 20,000 images, many of which were restored in a conservation effort in the early 1980s. That archive rests at the Historical Society in Ashfield, Massachusetts.

Reproductions of it are on microfilm at the University of Massachusetts–Amherst and at the Greenfield Public Library in Greenfield, MA. Edited by Alan Newman, "New England Reflections, 1882–1907: Photographs by the Howes Brothers" (Pantheon Books, 1981), is the book that describes the Howes brothers' life and work.
