= Richard Nelson Gardner =

American politician

Richard Nelson Gardner (September 11, 1881 – December 4, 1953) was an American lawyer and politician.

Gardner was born in Ashfield, Massachusetts and moved with his family to St. Cloud, Minnesota. He received his law degree from the University of Minnesota Law School in 1906 and was admitted to the Minnesota bar. Gardner moved to Staples, Minnesota in 1907 to practice law. He served as Staples City Attorney. Gardner also served on the Staples Board of Education and was the president of the school board. Gardner served in the Minnesota Senate from 1931 to 1943. He resigned from the Minnesota Senate in 1943 when he was appointed a referee in bankruptcy for the United States District Court serving until 1951. Gardner died in Saint Paul, Minnesota.
