= Ashfield, Massachusetts =

- Town
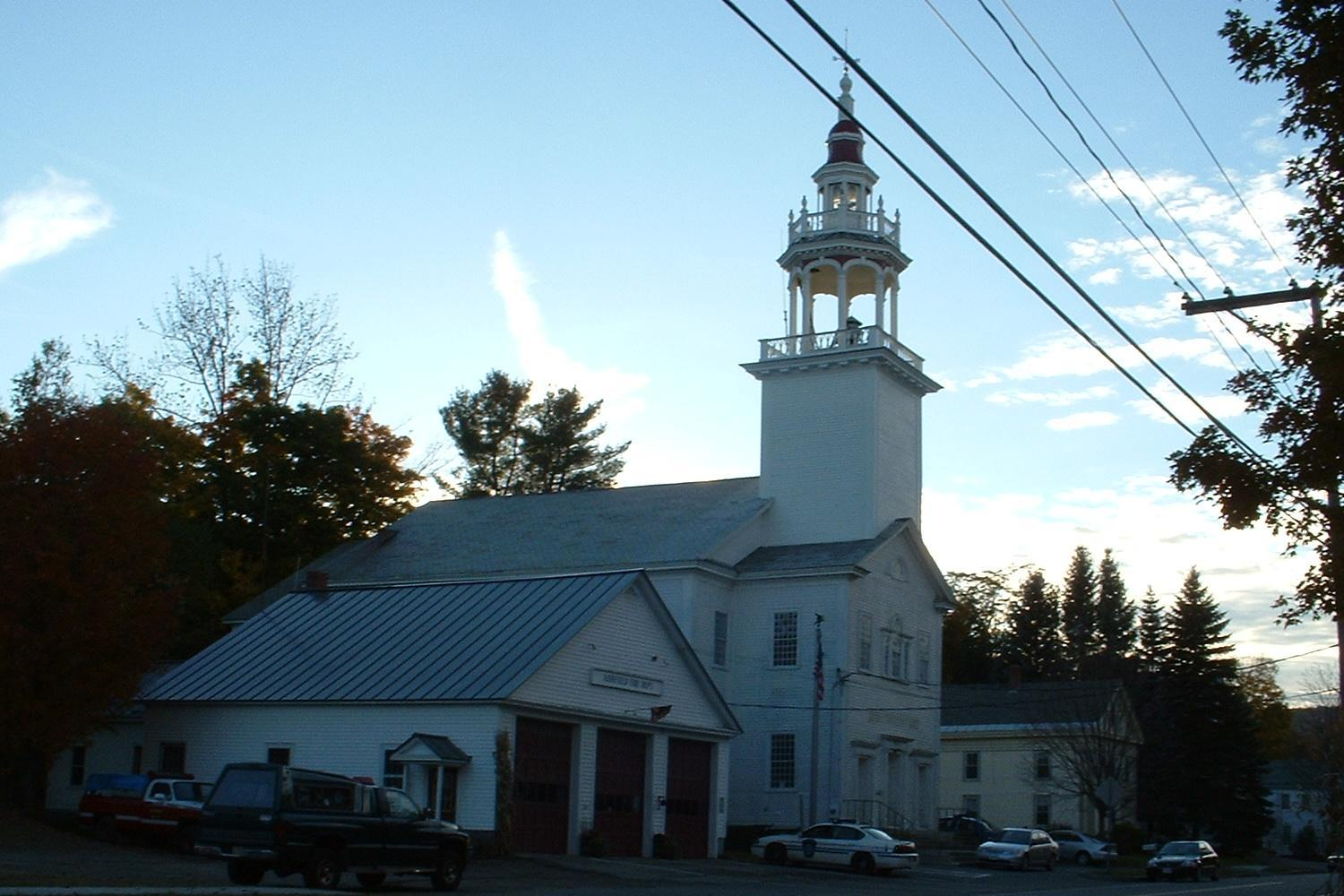
- Ashfield Town Hall (center), with the fire station on the left.

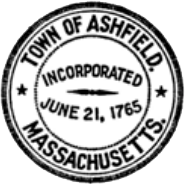
- Seal

- Location in Franklin County in Massachusetts
- Coordinates: 42°31′35″N 72°47′20″W
- Country: United States
- State: Massachusetts
- County: Franklin
- Settled: 1743
- Incorporated: 1765

Government
  - Type: Open town meeting

Area
  - Total: 40.3 sq mi (104.3 km^{2})
  - Land: 40.0 sq mi (103.6 km^{2})
  - Water: 0.27 sq mi (0.7 km^{2})
- Elevation: 1,447 ft (441 m)

Population (2020)
  - Total: 1,695
  - Density: 42.37/sq mi (16.36/km^{2})
- Time zone: UTC−5 (Eastern)
  - Summer (DST): UTC−4 (Eastern)
- ZIP Codes: 01330 (Ashfield); 01370 (Shelburne Falls)
- Area codes: 413
- FIPS code: 25-02095
- GNIS feature ID: 0619377
- Website: www.ashfield.org

Ashfield is a town in Franklin County, Massachusetts, United States. The population was 1,695 at the 2020 census. It is part of the Springfield, Massachusetts Metropolitan Statistical Area.

== History ==
Ashfield was first settled prior to 1743 by a freed slave named Heber who had purchased rights and drew lot #1 in 1739. Ashfield was officially incorporated in 1765. The town was originally called "Huntstown" for Captain Ephraim Hunt, who died in King William's War. Sixty of his crew had petitioned for and been granted the land as compensation for hardships and services during the ill designed "expedition to Canada" in 1690. The first permanent settlement was in 1745, by Richard Ellis, an Irish immigrant from the town of Easton. The town was renamed upon reincorporation, although there is debate over its namesake; it is either for the ash trees in the area, or because Governor Bernard had friends in Ashfield, England. The town had a small peppermint industry in the nineteenth century, but for the most part the town has had a mostly agrarian economy, with some tourism around Ashfield Lake.

Ashfield is the birthplace of prominent film director Cecil B. DeMille (whose parents were vacationing in the town at the time); Alvan Clark, nineteenth century astronomer and telescope maker; and William S. Clark, member of the Massachusetts Senate and third president of Massachusetts Agricultural College (now UMass Amherst).

== Geography ==
According to the United States Census Bureau, the town has a total area of 40.3 square miles (104.3 km^{2}), of which 40.0 square miles (103.6 km^{2}) is land and 0.27 square miles (0.7 km^{2}), or 0.62%, is water. Ashfield is located in the southwest corner of Franklin County, along the Hampshire County line. Ashfield is bordered by Buckland to the north, Conway to the east, Goshen to the south, Cummington to the southwest, Plainfield to the west, and Hawley to the northwest. The northern outlying section of town includes the historic neighborhoods of Beldingville and Baptist Corner. Ashfield is 15 miles (24 km) west-southwest of Greenfield, 35 miles (56 km) north-northwest of Springfield, and 105 miles (169 km) west-northwest of Boston.

Ashfield lies in the eastern foothills of The Berkshires, with several high hills, including Ridge Hill, in the northern portion of town. The town is fed by several rivers and brooks, including the South River, the "western" Swift River (the "eastern" river flows out of the Quabbin Reservoir in central Massachusetts) and several prominent brooks, most of which feed into either the Deerfield River or the Connecticut River. Near the center of town, Ashfield Lake feeds into the South River, and is a recreational site. In the southwest portion of town, a small portion of the Poland Brook Wildlife Management Area crosses into town, as does a portion of the Daughters of the American Revolution State Forest.

The town is at the junction of the north–south Route 112 and the east–west Route 116, which are combined for 1.4 miles (2.3 km) south of Ashfield Lake. The town is located approximately 12 miles (19 km) west of Interstate 91, the nearest interstate to the town. The nearest bus service is in Greenfield, with the nearest small air service being Turners Falls just east of there. The nearest Amtrak service is in Greenfield, and the nearest international air service is at Bradley International Airport in Windsor Locks, Connecticut.

== Demographics ==
Historical population
Year	Pop.	±%
1790	1,459	—
1840	1,579	+8.2%
1850	1,394	−11.7%
1860	1,302	−6.6%
1870	1,180	−9.4%
1880	1,066	−9.7%
1890	1,025	−3.8%
1900	955	−6.8%
1910	959	+0.4%
1920	869	−9.4%
1930	860	−1.0%
1940	872	+1.4%
1950	977	+12.0%
1960	1,131	+15.8%
1970	1,274	+12.6%
1980	1,458	+14.4%
1990	1,715	+17.6%
2000	1,800	+5.0%
2010	1,737	−3.5%
2020	1,695	−2.4%
2022	1,688	−0.4%
Source: United States census records and Population Estimates Program data.

As of the census of 2000, there were 1,800 people, 741 households, and 500 families residing in the town. By population, Ashfield ranked thirteenth of the twenty-six towns in Franklin County, and 296th out of the 351 cities and towns in Massachusetts. The population density was 44.7 inhabitants per square mile (17.3/km^{2}), which ranked seventeenth in the county and 314th in the Commonwealth. There were 821 housing units at an average density of 20.4 per square mile (7.9/km^{2}). The racial makeup of the town was 97.33% White, 0.61% African American, 0.11% Native American, 0.33% Asian, 0.06% from other races, and 1.56% from two or more races. Hispanic or Latino of any race were 0.44% of the population.

There were 741 households, out of which 31.8% had children under the age of 18 living with them, 55.6% were married couples living together, and 32.4% were non-families. Of all households, 24.0% were made up of individuals, and 8.2% had someone living alone who was 65 years of age or older. The average household size was 2.43 and the average family size was 2.90.

In the town, the population was spread out, with 23.8% under the age of 18, 4.9% from 18 to 24, 26.5% from 25 to 44, 33.2% from 45 to 64, and 11.6% who were 65 years of age or older. The median age was 42 years. For every 100 females, there were 96.3 males. For every 100 females age 18 and over, there were 88.7 males.

The median income for a household in the town was $52,875, and the median income for a family was $56,739. Males had a median income of $38,818 versus $31,146 for females. The per capita income for the town was $26,483. About 5.2% of families and 7.6% of the population were below the poverty line, including 14.4% of those under age 18 and 5.1% of those age 65 or over.

== Government ==
Ashfield employs the open town meeting form of government, and is led by a board of selectmen and a town administrator. All of the town's services are located in the town center, including the town hall, police and fire departments, as well as the Belding Memorial Library and the town's post office. The nearest hospital, Franklin Medical Center, is located in Greenfield, as are most of the nearest state offices.

On the state level, Ashfield is represented in the Massachusetts House of Representatives as part of the First Franklin district, represented by Steve Kulik, which covers the towns of Ashfield, Buckland, Chester, Chesterfield, Conway, Cummington, Deerfield, Goshen, Huntington, Leverett, Middlefield, Montague, Plainfield, Shelburne, Shutesbury, Sunderland, Whately, Williamsburg, and Worthington. In the Massachusetts Senate, the town is part of the Berkshire, Hampshire and Franklin district, represented by Adam Hinds, which includes all of Berkshire County as well as western portions of Franklin and Hampshire Counties. The town is patrolled by the Second Barracks of Troop "B" of the Massachusetts State Police, headquartered in Shelburne Falls.

On the national level, Ashfield is represented in the United States House of Representatives as part of Massachusetts's 1st congressional district, and has been represented by Richard Neal of Springfield since January 3, 2013. Massachusetts is currently represented in the United States Senate by Ed Markey, and Elizabeth Warren.

== Education ==
Ashfield is a member of the Mohawk Trail / Hawlemont Regional School District, along with Buckland, Charlemont, Colrain, Hawley, Heath, Plainfield, Rowe, and Shelburne. The town serves 1 elementary school: Sanderson Academy, which also serves the neighboring town of Plainfield which serves K–6. High school students then attend Mohawk Trail Regional High School. There are several private, religious and charter schools located in the Greenfield area, with the most prominent being Northfield Mount Hermon School in Gill, Deerfield Academy in Deerfield, and the Academy at Charlemont in Charlemont.

The nearest community college, Greenfield Community College, is located in Greenfield. The nearest state college is Massachusetts College of Liberal Arts in North Adams, and the nearest state university is the University of Massachusetts Amherst. The nearest private colleges, including members of the Five Colleges and Seven Sisters, are located southeast in the Northampton area.

== Library ==
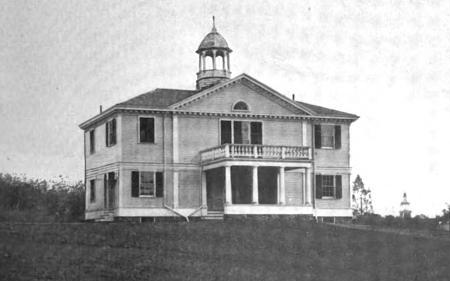
Former Ashfield public library building in 1899

"The Ashfield Library Association was formed in 1866, through the influence of Prof. Charles Eliot Norton and Hon. George William Curtis, summer residents of the town. It absorbed the books formerly belonging to the Second Social Library of Ashfield [est. 1815] ... and these volumes, with liberal donations from the gentlemen above named, formed the nucleus of the library." Around 1911 "Andrew Carnegie ... offered to give $3,000 for a library building, on the usual terms, but there [was] opposition to accepting the offer." The current Belding Memorial Library building was donated in 1913 by silk manufacturer M. M. Belding, a New Yorker. At the time, Belding's gift was considered particularly generous: "The announcement that the little town of Ashfield in Western Massachusetts—a town once famous for its summer colony of learning and culture ... is to be presented with a 30,000-dollar public library by a filially affectionate native of the place, Mr. M. M. Belding of New York, prompts the query whether a little farming community of less than a thousand inhabitants, barely making its rock-ribbed acres yield it a livelihood, will thoroughly enjoy the prospect of maintaining the splendid institutions whose marble walls, bronze doors, pedestal lamps, and other luxurious appurtenances, will present an appearance so strikingly at variance with their simple rural environment."

== Notable people ==
- John Q. Adams (1816–1895), former Wisconsin State Senator and Wisconsin State Assemblyman, born in Ashfield
- Alon Bement (1876–1954) was an artist, arts administrator, author, and educator, born in Ashfield
- Cecil B. DeMille (1881–1959), film director and producer, born in Ashfield
- Richard Nelson Gardner (1881–1953), Minnesota state senator and lawyer
- G. Stanley Hall (1846–1924), pioneering American psychologist and educator
- Howes Brothers Alvah (1853–1919), Walter (1861–1945), and on occasion George (1865–1925), early American photographers
- Charles Knowlton(1800–1850), American physician, writer and early proponent of birth control
- Ray LaMontagne (1973–), musician, songwriter, entertainer, storyteller
- Henry Clay Payne (1843–1904) was 40th U.S. Postmaster General from 1902 to 1904 under Pres. Theodore Roosevelt and chairman of the Republican National Committee
- Dora Knowlton Ranous (1859–1916), author, editor, translator, book reviewer

== See also ==
- Double Edge Theatre
