= Alice Parker =

American classical composer (1925–2023)

- Portrait of Parker by Eduardo Montes-Bradley
- Born: Alice Stuart Parker; December 16, 1925; Boston, Massachusetts, U.S.
- Died: December 24, 2023 (aged 98); Hawley, Massachusetts, U.S.
- Occupations: Composer; Arranger; Conductor; Teacher
- Years active: 1947–2020
- Spouse: Thomas F. Pyle (m. 1954; died 1976)

Alice Stuart Parker Pyle (December 16, 1925 – December 24, 2023), known professionally as Alice Parker, was an American composer, arranger, conductor and teacher.

== Early life and education ==
Parker was born in Boston, Massachusetts, on December 16, 1925, to Gordon Parker, who worked in the hardwood business, and Mary Shumate Stuart, who founded and directed a plastics laminate company. She grew up in Boston and Winchester, Massachusetts.

After studying music theory with Mary Mason at the New England Conservatory in Boston, Parker attended Smith College in Northampton, Massachusetts, graduating in 1947 with a double major in organ and composition. She then spent a summer at Tanglewood, studying with the conductor Robert Shaw, with whom she went on to have a long and prolific association, and Julius Herford, before beginning a graduate program in choral conducting at the Juilliard School in New York City.

== Career ==
Having begun her career as a high school teacher, Parker also collaborated with Robert Shaw on arrangements of materials to be recorded by the Robert Shaw Chorale, and was featured alongside other singers on the front cover of Newsweek on December 29, 1947.

In addition to her work with the Chorale, Parker wrote a total of 5 operas, 11 song-cycles, 33 cantatas, 11 works for chorus and orchestra, 47 choral suites, and more than 40 original hymns. She also arranged spirituals, hymns, and folk songs, including French, Spanish, Hebrew, and Ladino folk songs, many of which have become part of the repertoire of choirs around the world.

Having divided her time between a New York apartment and her home in Hawley, Massachusetts, Parker decided, at the age of 70, to move permanently to Singing Brook Farm in Hawley, which her father had purchased in 1920 and where she had spent her childhood summers. In Hawley she founded the professional choir Melodious Accord in 1985, with which she released 14 albums and established a fellowship program to enable mid-career musicians to study with her. Parker attended the Federated Church in nearby Charlemont, Massachusetts, and assisted with its music program.

== Honors and awards ==
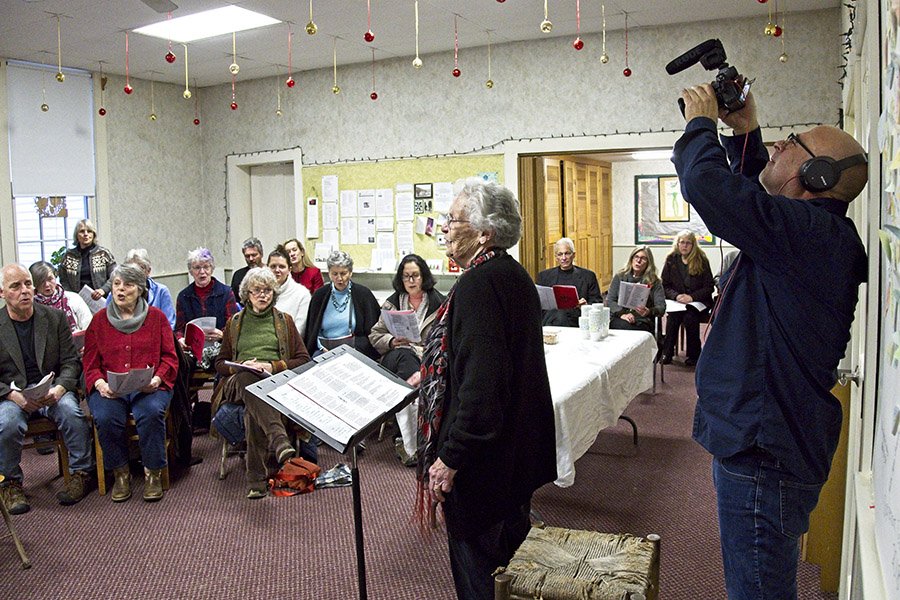
Alice Parker conducting in 2019.

Parker served on the Board of Directors of Chorus America and was their first Director Laureate. She received the Distinguished Composer of the Year award from the American Guild of Organists in 2000, the 2014 Brock Commission from the American Choral Directors Association, the Harvard Glee Club Foundation Medal in 2015, six honorary doctorates, and the Smith College Medal, as well as many other awards. She was a Fellow of the Hymn Society of the United States and Canada, and was awarded grants from the American Society of Composers, Authors and Publishers, the National Endowment for the Arts, the Aaron Copland Fund for Music, and the American Music Center. She was also honored by the International Emily Dickinson Society for her choral suite Heavenly Hurt.

In 2020 a documentary film by Eduardo Montes-Bradley was released, entitled Alice: At Home With Alice Parker. Produced by HFP in association with Melodious Accord, Inc., it focuses on Parker's formative years and her collaboration on texts by Martin Luther King Jr., Archibald MacLeish, Eudora Welty and Emily Dickinson. It was selected for the 2020 Virginia Film Festival.

== Personal life and death ==
In 1954 Parker married Thomas F. Pyle (1918−1976), a baritone soloist and member of the Robert Shaw Chorale, with whom she had two sons and three daughters. Following his death from a heart attack, a choir made up of 400 of his acquaintances sang Brahms's A German Requiem at his memorial service at the Cathedral of St. John the Divine in New York.

Parker died at her home in Hawley on December 24, 2023, at the age of 98.

== Selected works ==
=== Operas ===
- The Martyrs' Mirror (1971)
- The Family Reunion (1976)
- Singers Glen (1978)
- The Ponder Heart (1982)

=== Original songs or arrangements ===
- Songs for Eve (1975)
- Echoes from the Hills (1984)
- Folk Song Transformation (1985)
- O Sing the Glories (2005)
- Heavenly Hurt: Songs of Love and Loss (2017)
- On the Common Ground (2020)

=== Books ===
- Music: Pocket Crammer (1964)
- Creative Hymn Singing (1976)
- Melodious Accord: Good Singing in Church (1991)
- The Anatomy of Melody: Exploring the Single Line of Song (2006), ISBN 978-1579995607
- The Answering Voice: The Beginning of Counterpoint (2016), ISBN 978-1622770984
