= Buckland, Massachusetts =

- Town
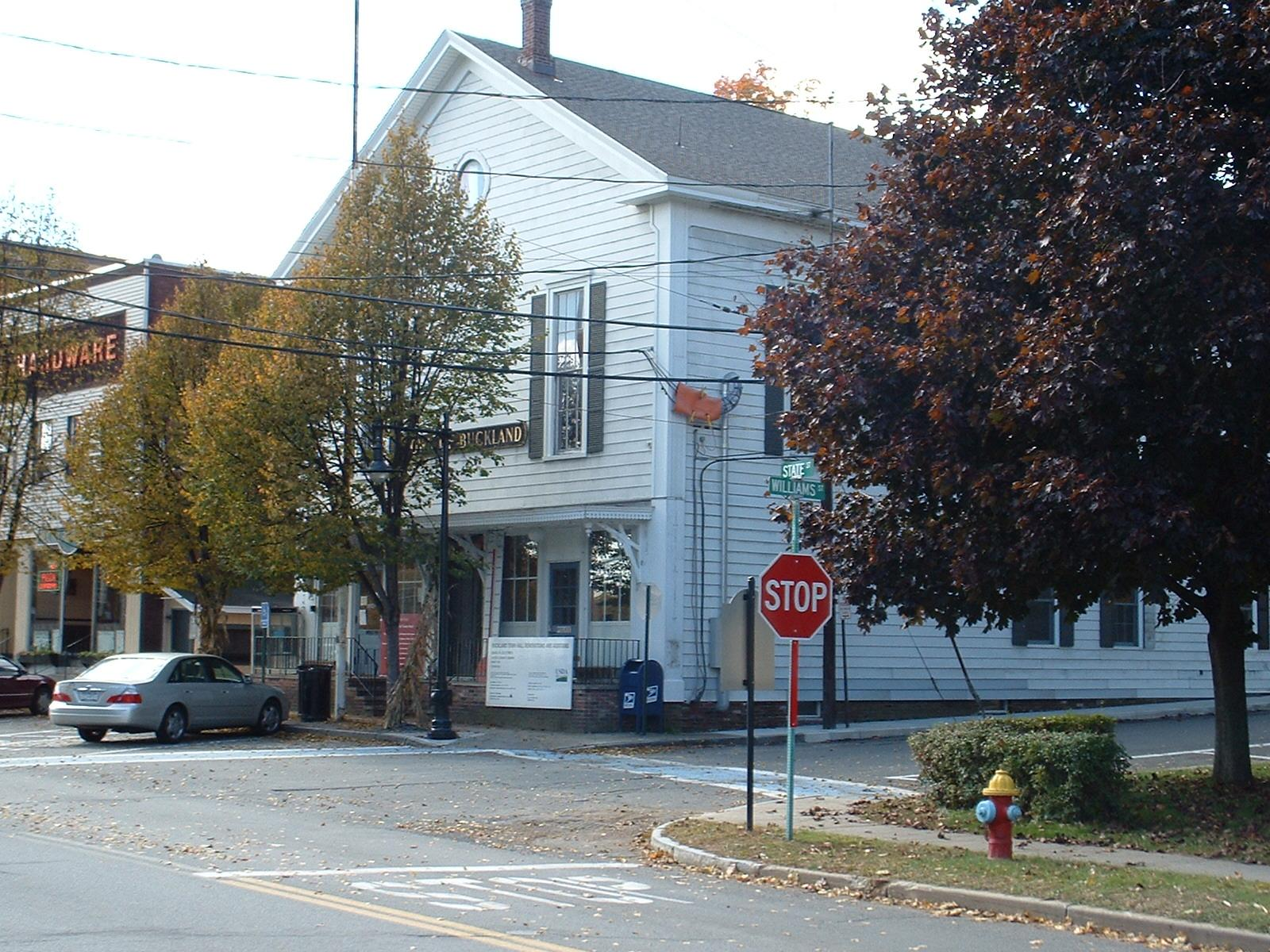
- Buckland Town Hall

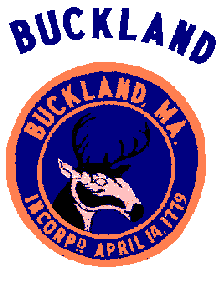
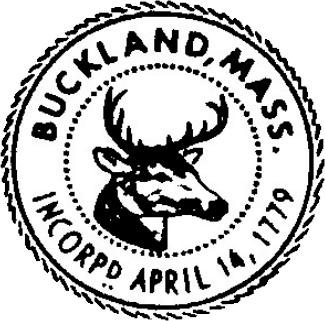
- Flag Seal

- Location in Franklin County in Massachusetts
- Coordinates: 42°35′32″N 72°47′32″W
- Country: United States
- State: Massachusetts
- County: Franklin
- Settled: 1779
- Incorporated: 1779

Government
  - Type: Open town meeting

Area
  - Total: 19.9 sq mi (51.5 km^{2})
  - Land: 19.7 sq mi (50.9 km^{2})
  - Water: 0.19 sq mi (0.5 km^{2})
- Elevation: 607 ft (185 m)

Population (2020)
  - Total: 1,816
  - Density: 92.4/sq mi (35.7/km^{2})
- Time zone: UTC-5 (Eastern)
  - Summer (DST): UTC-4 (Eastern)
- ZIP Codes: 01338 (Buckland); 01330 (Ashfield); 01339 (Charlemont); 01370 (Shelburne Falls)
- Area code: 413
- FIPS code: 25-09595
- GNIS feature ID: 0618159
- Website: town.buckland.ma.us

Buckland is a town in Franklin County, Massachusetts, United States. The population was 1,816 at the 2020 census. The town shares the village of Shelburne Falls with neighboring Shelburne. The town center at Shelburne Falls is the western end of the Bridge of Flowers, a local tourist attraction.

Buckland is part of the Springfield, Massachusetts Metropolitan Statistical Area.

== History ==
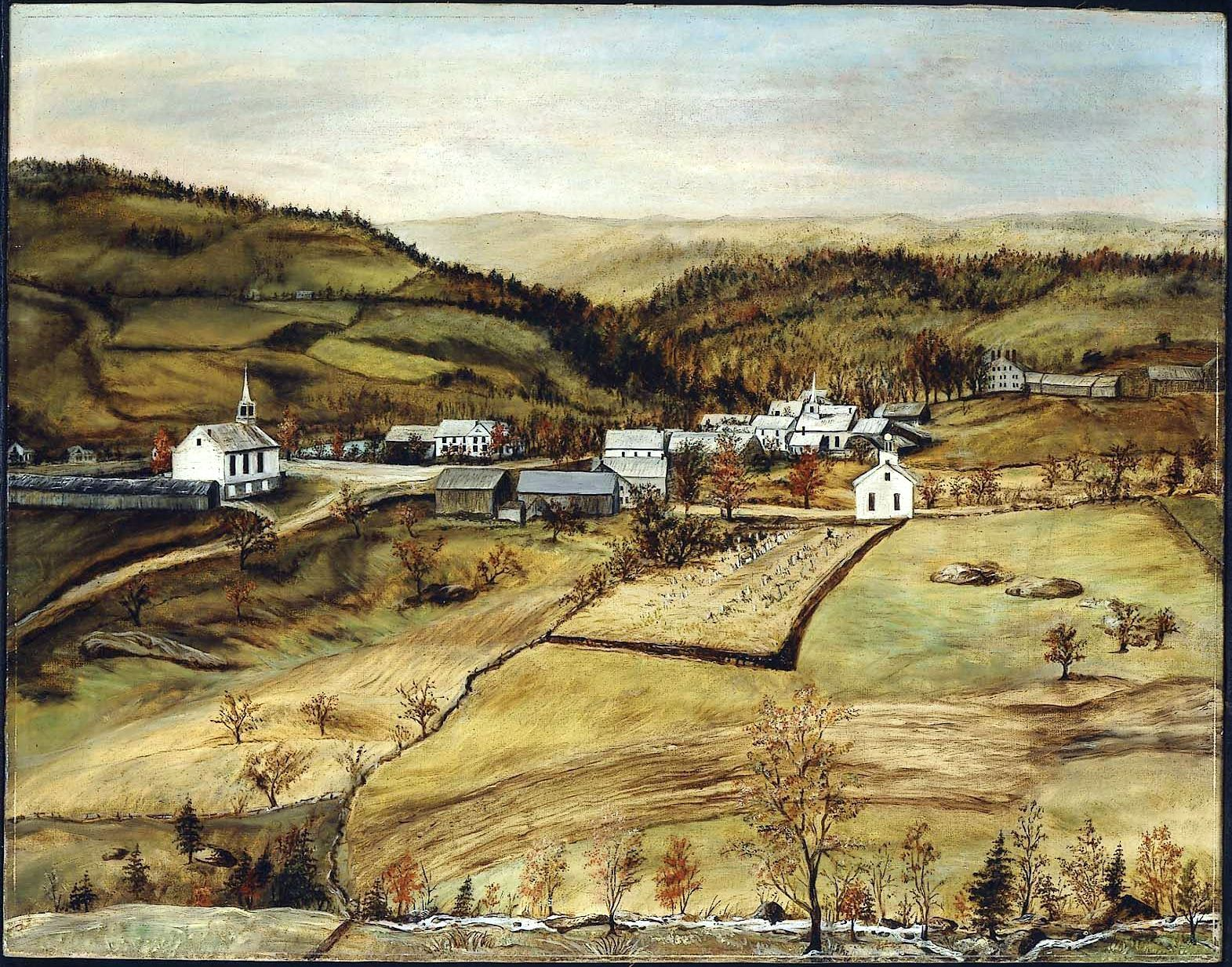
Buckland c. 1850–1868

Buckland was first settled in 1742 as "No Town", as it was not currently part of either the village of Charlemont or Ashfield, which the land belonged to as one large town. A sawmill was set up that year by Othneil Taylor and Asaph White, and eventually settlement occurred. However, the townspeople did not want to cross the Deerfield River or travel the long distance to Ashfield Village to attend services, so they petitioned the Massachusetts General Court for a separate incorporation. The town was incorporated on April 14, 1779, as Buckland, presumably named for the abundant hunting in the area.

Buckland was the birthplace of Mary Lyon, founder of the Mount Holyoke Female Seminary, now known as Mount Holyoke College.

== Geography ==
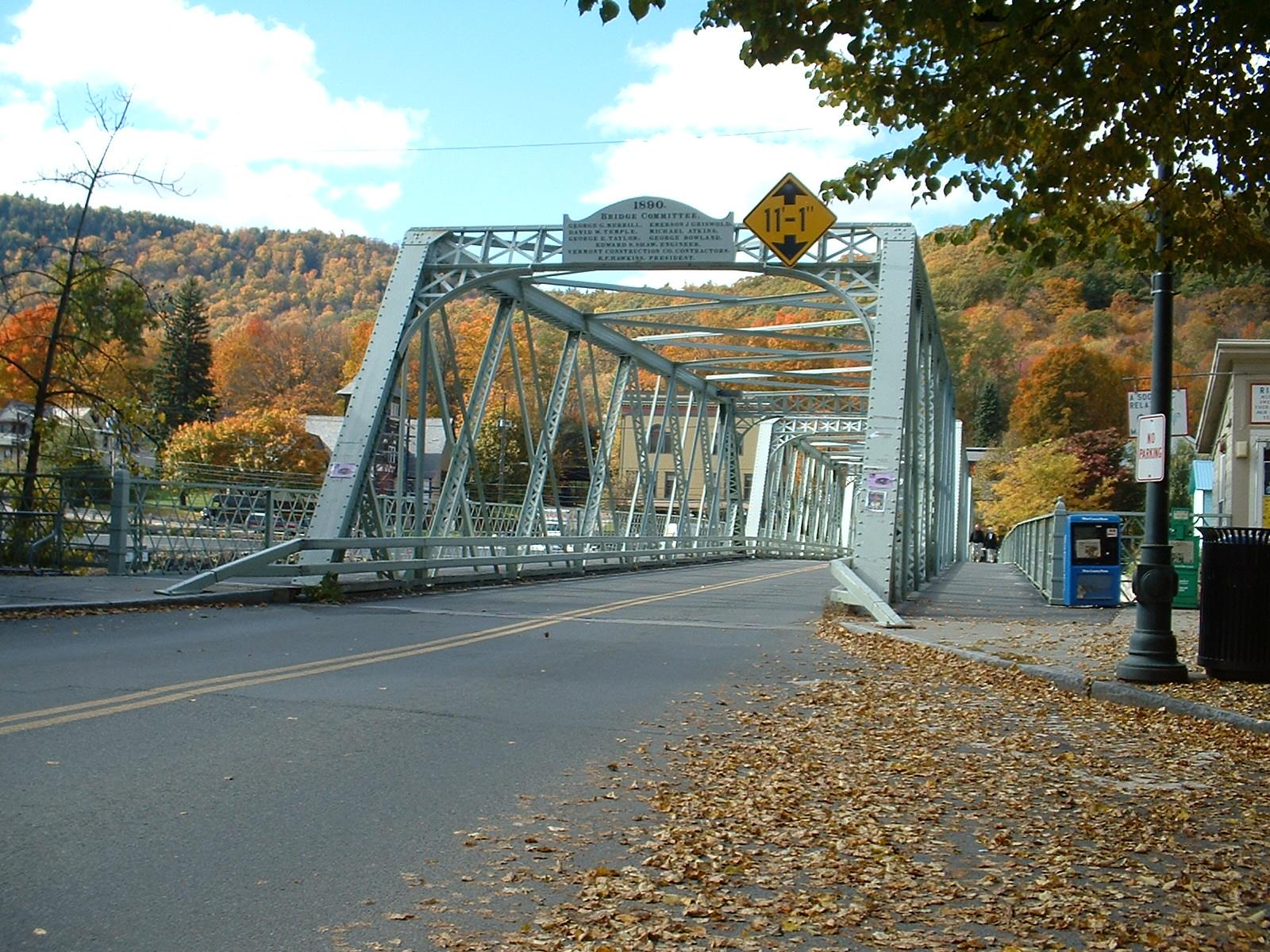
Shelburne Falls Truss Bridge carries Routes 2A and 112 across the Deerfield River

According to the United States Census Bureau, the town has a total area of 19.9 square miles (51.5 km^{2}), of which 19.7 square miles (50.9 km^{2}) is land and 0.19 square miles (0.5 km^{2}), or 1.05%, is water. Buckland is located in western Franklin County, and is bordered by Charlemont to the north, Shelburne to the northeast, Conway to the southeast, Ashfield to the south, and Hawley to the west. Buckland's town center is located 13 miles (21 km) west of Greenfield, 40 miles (64 km) north-northwest of Springfield, and 103 miles (166 km) west-northwest of Boston.

Buckland is bounded on the north and east by the Deerfield River. Clesson Brook and Clark Brook flow northward through town towards the river, with the former forming the main valley in the town. To either side of the valley lie several hills, including Walnut Hill, Drank Hill and Snow Mountain to the west and Mary Lyon Hill and Moonshine Hill to the east, both of which are between the two brooks. A small state forest occupies part of Moonshine Hill.

A short section of Massachusetts Route 2, known as the Mohawk Trail, passes through the northeast corner of town. The nearest interstate, Interstate 91, passes through nearby Greenfield.

There is a park and ride lot located on Route 2, near the bridge over the river to Shelburne Falls. South of the river, the freight rail line passes from Conway in the east towards the Hoosac Tunnel through the mountains to the west. Buckland lies along the Charlemont bus line of the Franklin Regional Transit Authority (FRTA), but has no scheduled stops in town (the nearest being in Charlemont and Shelburne Falls). The nearest Amtrak station is in Greenfield, and the nearest small air service is at Turners Falls Municipal Airport. The nearest national air service is at Bradley International Airport in Windsor Locks, Connecticut.

== Demographics ==
Historical population
Year	Pop.	±%
1790	718	—
1840	1,110	+54.6%
1850	1,056	−4.9%
1860	1,702	+61.2%
1870	1,946	+14.3%
1880	1,739	−10.6%
1890	1,570	−9.7%
1900	1,446	−7.9%
1910	1,573	+8.8%
1920	1,433	−8.9%
1930	1,497	+4.5%
1940	1,527	+2.0%
1950	1,605	+5.1%
1960	1,664	+3.7%
1970	1,892	+13.7%
1980	1,864	−1.5%
1990	1,928	+3.4%
2000	1,991	+3.3%
2010	1,902	−4.5%
2020	1,816	−4.5%
2022*	1,810	−0.3%
* = population estimate. Source: United States census records and Population Estimates Program data.

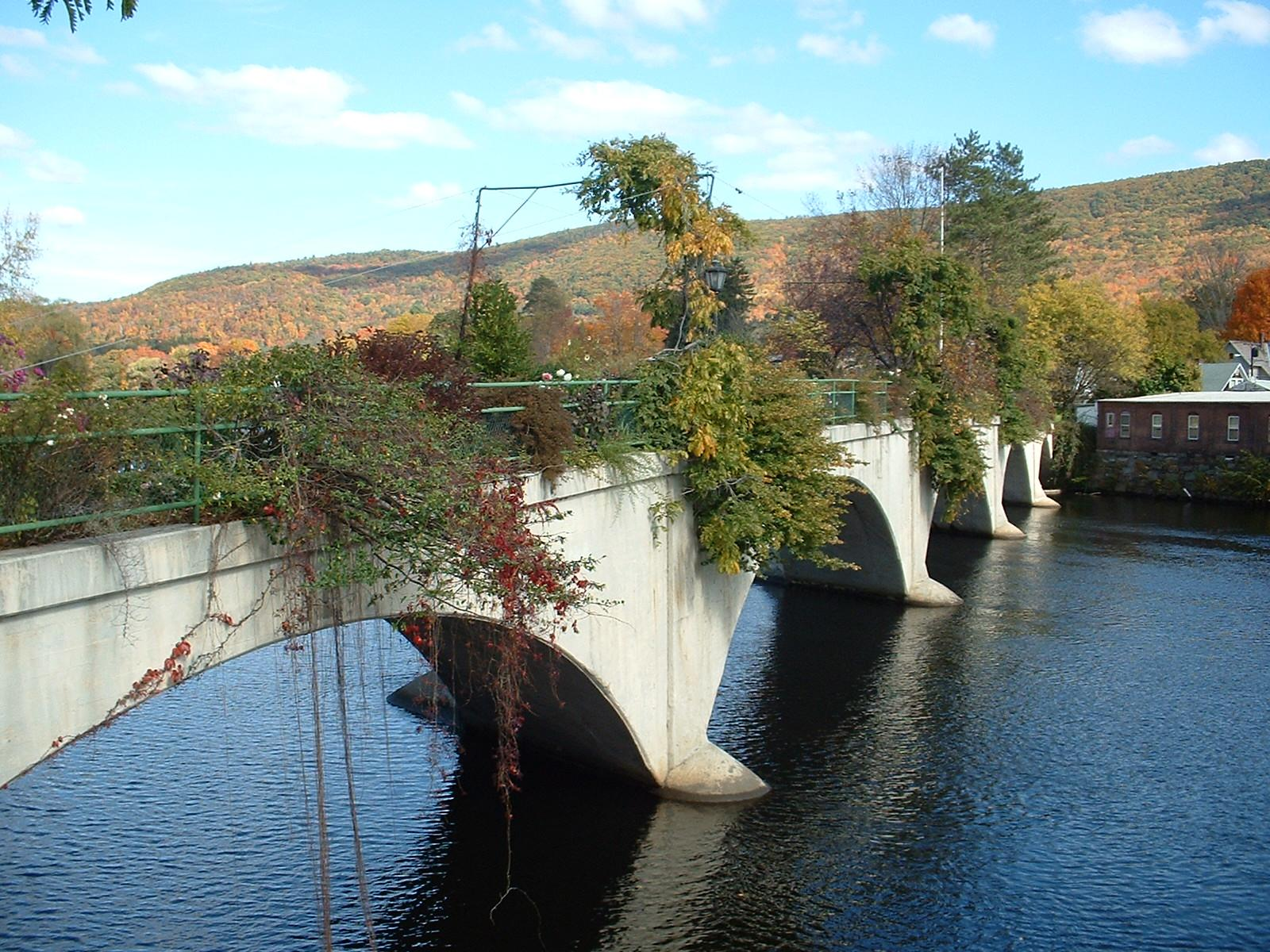
The Bridge of Flowers

As of the census of 2000, there were 1,991 people, 772 households, and 542 families residing in the town. By population, Buckland ranks ninth out of the twenty-six towns in Franklin County, and 291st out of the 351 cities and towns in Massachusetts. The population density was 101.8 inhabitants per square mile (39.3/km^{2}), which ranks seventh in the county and 280th in the Commonwealth. There were 839 housing units at an average density of 42.9 per square mile (16.6/km^{2}). The racial makeup of the town was 96.53% White, 0.45% African American, 0.45% Native American, 0.65% Asian, 0.50% from other races, and 1.41% from two or more races. Hispanic or Latino of any race were 1.16% of the population.

There were 772 households, out of which 33.2% had children under the age of 18 living with them, 54.1% were married couples living together, 11.9% had a female householder with no husband present, and 29.7% were non-families. 21.8% of all households were made up of individuals, and 8.2% had someone living alone who was 65 years of age or older. The average household size was 2.57 and the average family size was 3.00.

In the town, the population was spread out, with 25.0% under the age of 18, 7.8% from 18 to 24, 26.4% from 25 to 44, 27.6% from 45 to 64, and 13.3% who were 65 years of age or older. The median age was 40 years. For every 100 females, there were 99.7 males. For every 100 females age 18 and over, there were 92.3 males.

The median income for a household in the town was $45,833, and the median income for a family was $51,420. Males had a median income of $38,684 versus $24,977 for females. The per capita income for the town was $20,033. About 3.5% of families and 6.9% of the population were below the poverty line, including 5.9% of those under age 18 and 6.7% of those age 65 or over.

== Government ==
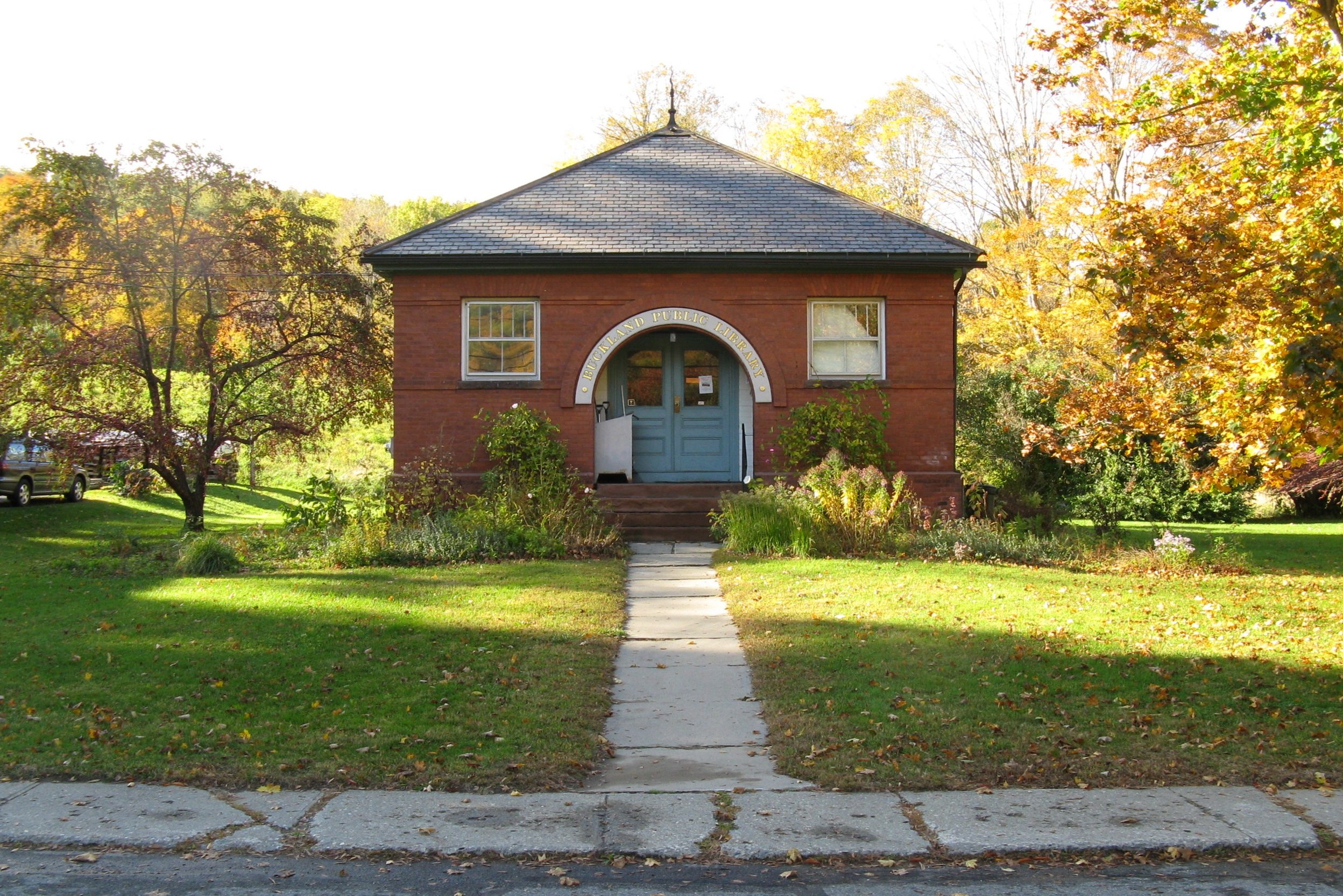
Buckland Public Library

Buckland employs the open town meeting form of government, and is governed by a board of selectmen and an administrative assistant. The town offices, police station and fire station are all located in Shelburne Falls, with the Buckland Public Library and the town's post office located near the geographic center of town. The nearest hospital, Franklin Medical Center, is located in Greenfield, as are most of the nearest state offices. The town is patrolled by the Second Barracks of Troop "B" of the Massachusetts State Police, headquartered on the Shelburne side of Shelburne Falls.

On the state level, Buckland is represented in the Massachusetts House of Representatives as part of the 1st Franklin District, represented by Natalie Blais. In the Massachusetts Senate, the town is part of the Berkshire, Hampden, Franklin and Hampshire district, represented by Paul Mark.

On the national level, Buckland is represented in the United States House of Representatives as part of Massachusetts's 1st congressional district and has been represented by Richard Neal of Springfield since January 2013, and is represented in the United States Senate by Ed Markey, and Elizabeth Warren. Neal was redistricted from Massachusetts's 2nd congressional district due to Massachusetts's loss of one seat in the House after reapportionment following the 2010 United States census.

== Education ==
Buckland is a member of the Mohawk Trail / Hawlemont Regional School District, along with Ashfield, Charlemont, Colrain, Hawley, Heath, Plainfield, Rowe, and Shelburne. Students attend Buckland-Shelburne Regional Elementary School, which also serves the neighboring town of Shelburne which serves K–6. High school students then attend Mohawk Trail Regional High School. Mohawk Trail Regional's athletics teams are nicknamed the Warriors, and their school colors are blue and gold. There are several private, religious and charter schools located in the Greenfield area, with the most prominent being Deerfield Academy in Deerfield, Northfield Mount Hermon School in Gill, the Academy at Charlemont in Charlemont, Eaglebrook School in Deerfield, and Stoneleigh-Burnham School in Greenfield.

The nearest community college, Greenfield Community College, is located in Greenfield. The nearest state college is Massachusetts College of Liberal Arts in North Adams, and the nearest state university is the University of Massachusetts Amherst. The nearest private colleges, including members of the Five Colleges and Seven Sisters, are located southeast in the Northampton area.
