= Shelburne, Massachusetts =

- Town
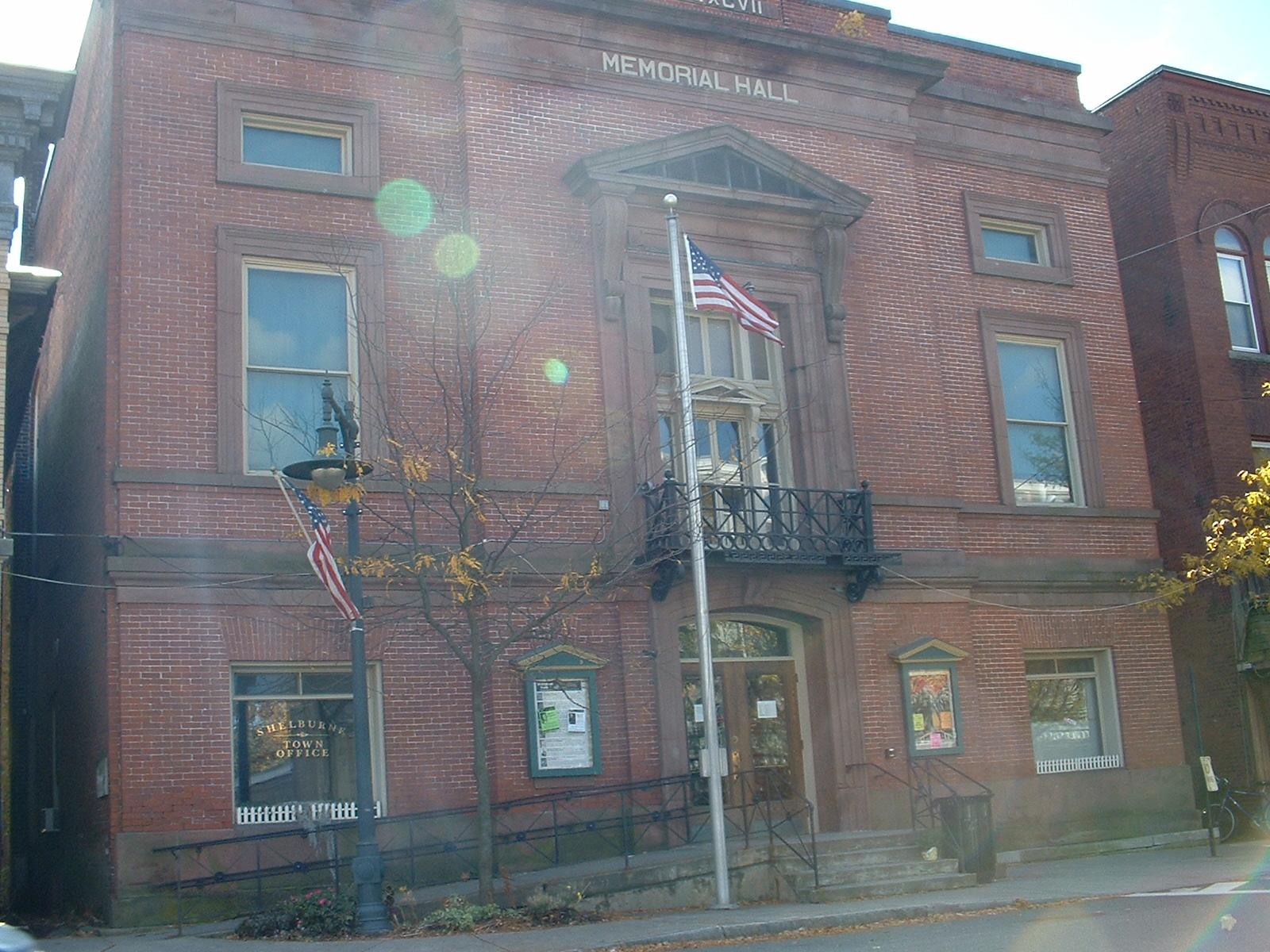
- Shelburne Memorial Hall

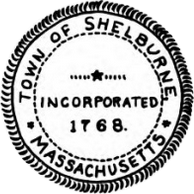
- Seal

- Location in Franklin County in Massachusetts
- Coordinates: 42°35′N 72°41′W
- Country: United States
- State: Massachusetts
- County: Franklin
- Settled: 1756
- Incorporated: 1768

Government
  - Type: Open town meeting

Area
  - Total: 23.4 sq mi (60.6 km^{2})
  - Land: 23.2 sq mi (60.0 km^{2})
  - Water: 0.23 sq mi (0.6 km^{2})
- Elevation: 935 ft (285 m)

Population (2020)
  - Total: 1,884
  - Density: 81.3/sq mi (31.4/km^{2})
- Time zone: UTC−5 (Eastern)
  - Summer (DST): UTC−4 (Eastern)
- ZIP Code: 01370 (Shelburne Falls)
- Area code: 413
- FIPS code: 25-61135
- GNIS feature ID: 0618175
- Website: townofshelburnema.gov

Shelburne is a town in Franklin County, Massachusetts, United States. The population was 1,884 at the 2020 census. It is part of the Springfield, Massachusetts Metropolitan Statistical Area.

The village of Shelburne Falls is located partly in Shelburne and neighboring Buckland.

== History ==
Shelburne was first settled in 1756 as part of Deerfield, Massachusetts, known then as "Deerfield Northwest". It was initially organized as the district of Shelburne in 1768, named in honor of William Petty, 2nd Earl of Shelburne, an Irish-born British politician, who later served as Prime Minister during the American Revolutionary War. Shelburne was officially incorporated as a town in 1775. Its character has always been two-sided; the main body of town has farmland among the low hills, while the area around Shelburne Falls has mostly been a milling community.

== Geography ==
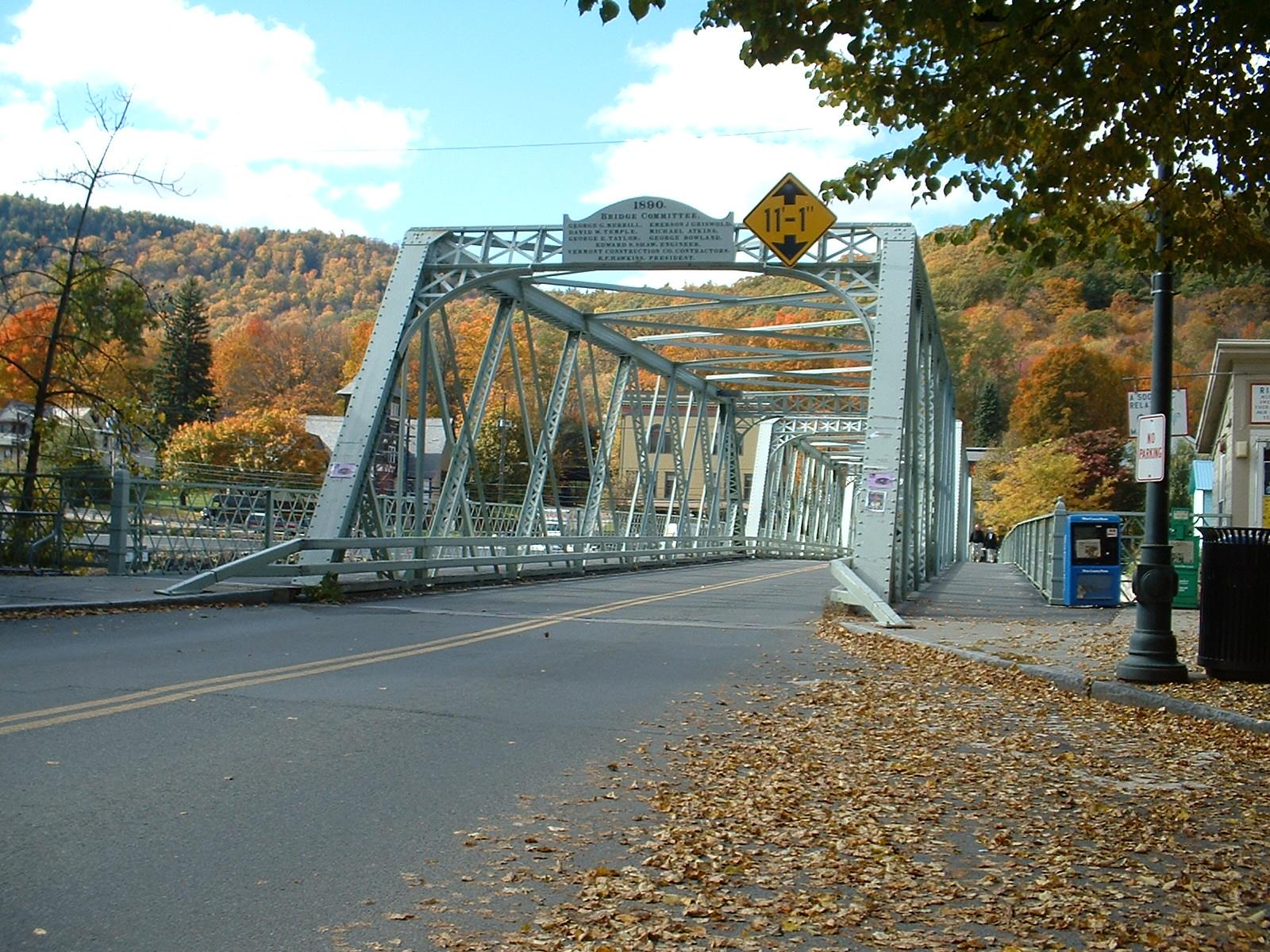
Shelburne Falls Truss Bridge, which carries Rte. 2A and Rte. 112 across the Deerfield River

According to the United States Census Bureau, the town has a total area of 23.4 square miles (60.6 km^{2}), of which 23.2 square miles (60.0 km^{2}) is land and 0.23 square miles (0.6 km^{2}), or 0.96%, is water. Shelburne is located in central Franklin County, and is bordered by Colrain to the north, Greenfield to the east, Deerfield to the southeast, Conway to the south, Buckland to the west, and a short, 0.4-mile (0.64 km) stretch of Charlemont to the northwest. The town's center is located 5 miles (8 km) west of Greenfield, 39 miles (63 km) north of Springfield, and 95 miles (153 km) west-northwest of Boston.

Shelburne lies along the eastern banks of the Deerfield River, which flows along the town's southern and western border. Several brooks feed into the river through the town, flowing down from several low peaks of the foothills of The Berkshires. Massaemett Mountain is the highest point in town, lying just east of Shelburne Falls, and there are several other low peaks, including Greenfield Mountain to the east. Massaemett also is home to two small sections of the town's state forest. In the village of Shelburne Falls are the "Glacial Potholes", a waterfall with many "potholes", traces of large rock activity along the Deerfield River.

Shelburne lies along Massachusetts Route 2, commonly known as the Mohawk Trail, which is the main east-west route through the northern part of Massachusetts. The short, westernmost section of Route 2A connects the highway with the heart of Shelburne Falls, passing into Buckland before finally ending there. Shelburne Falls is also served by Route 112, which follows the river southward before crossing with Route 2A across the 1890 truss bridge into Buckland, where the road bends northward before eventually continuing southward. The nearest expressway, Interstate 91, passes through neighboring Greenfield and Deerfield, and can be accessed along Route 2.

The nearest freight rail service is in Buckland, with the nearest Amtrak service being in Greenfield. There is regional bus service in Greenfield, as well as the Campus West route of the Franklin Regional Transit Authority (FRTA), which extends towards Charlemont with a scheduled stop in Shelburne Falls. The nearest general aviation airport is in nearby Turners Falls, with the nearest national air service being at Bradley International Airport in Windsor Locks, Connecticut.

== Demographics ==
Historical population
Year	Pop.	±%
1790	1,183	—
1840	1,183	+0.0%
1850	1,239	+4.7%
1860	1,448	+16.9%
1870	1,582	+9.3%
1880	1,621	+2.5%
1890	1,558	−3.9%
1900	1,508	−3.2%
1910	1,498	−0.7%
1920	1,436	−4.1%
1930	1,544	+7.5%
1940	1,636	+6.0%
1950	1,756	+7.3%
1960	1,739	−1.0%
1970	1,836	+5.6%
1980	2,002	+9.0%
1990	2,012	+0.5%
2000	2,058	+2.3%
2010	1,893	−8.0%
2020	1,884	−0.5%
2022	1,886	+0.1%
Source: United States census records and Population Estimates Program data.

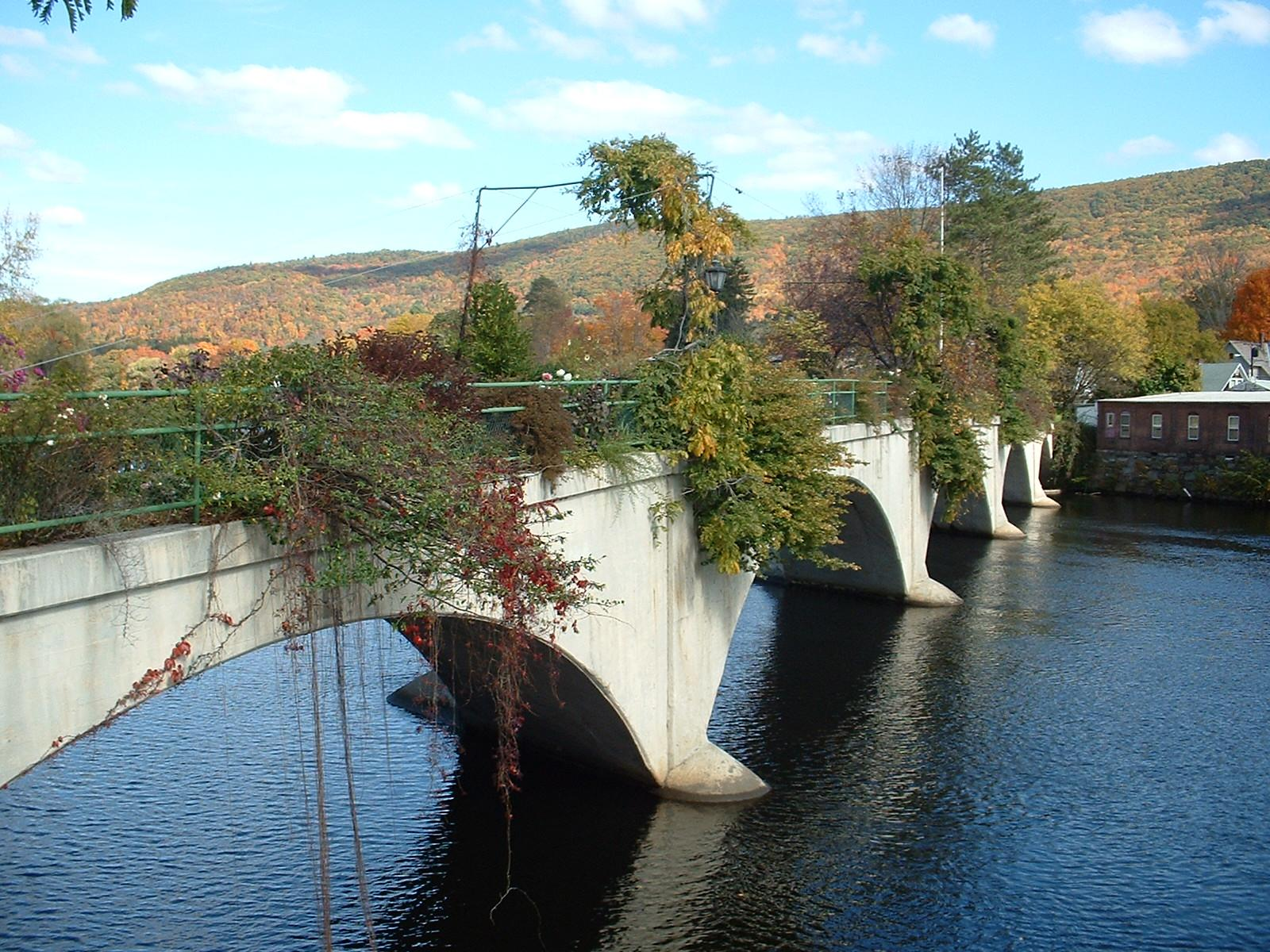
The Bridge of Flowers

As of the census of 2000, there were 2,058 people, 834 households, and 517 families residing in the town. By population, Shelburne ranked eighth out of the 26 towns in Franklin County, and 290th out of the 351 cities and towns in Massachusetts. The population density was 88.5 inhabitants per square mile (34.2/km^{2}), which ranked tenth in the county and 291st in the Commonwealth. There were 886 housing units at an average density of 38.1 per square mile (14.7/km^{2}). The racial makeup of the town was 97.28% White, 0.49% African American, 0.44% Native American, 0.24% Asian, 0.05% Pacific Islander, 0.39% from other races, and 1.12% from two or more races. Hispanic or Latino of any race were 0.58% of the population.

There were 834 households, out of which 27.6% had children under the age of 18 living with them, 50.2% were married couples living together, 7.4% had a female householder with no husband present, and 37.9% were non-families. 30.3% of all households were made up of individuals, and 13.8% had someone living alone who was 65 years of age or older. The average household size was 2.31 and the average family size was 2.86.

In the town, the population was spread out, with 21.1% under the age of 18, 6.2% from 18 to 24, 23.0% from 25 to 44, 29.3% from 45 to 64, and 20.5% who were 65 years of age or older. The median age was 45 years. For every 100 females, there were 89.9 males. For every 100 females age 18 and over, there were 84.9 males.

The median income for a household in the town was $42,054, and the median income for a family was $51,364. Males had a median income of $39,018 versus $28,550 for females. The per capita income for the town was $20,329. About 8.7% of families and 9.9% of the population were below the poverty line, including 6.6% of those under age 18 and 17.5% of those age 65 or over.

== Government ==
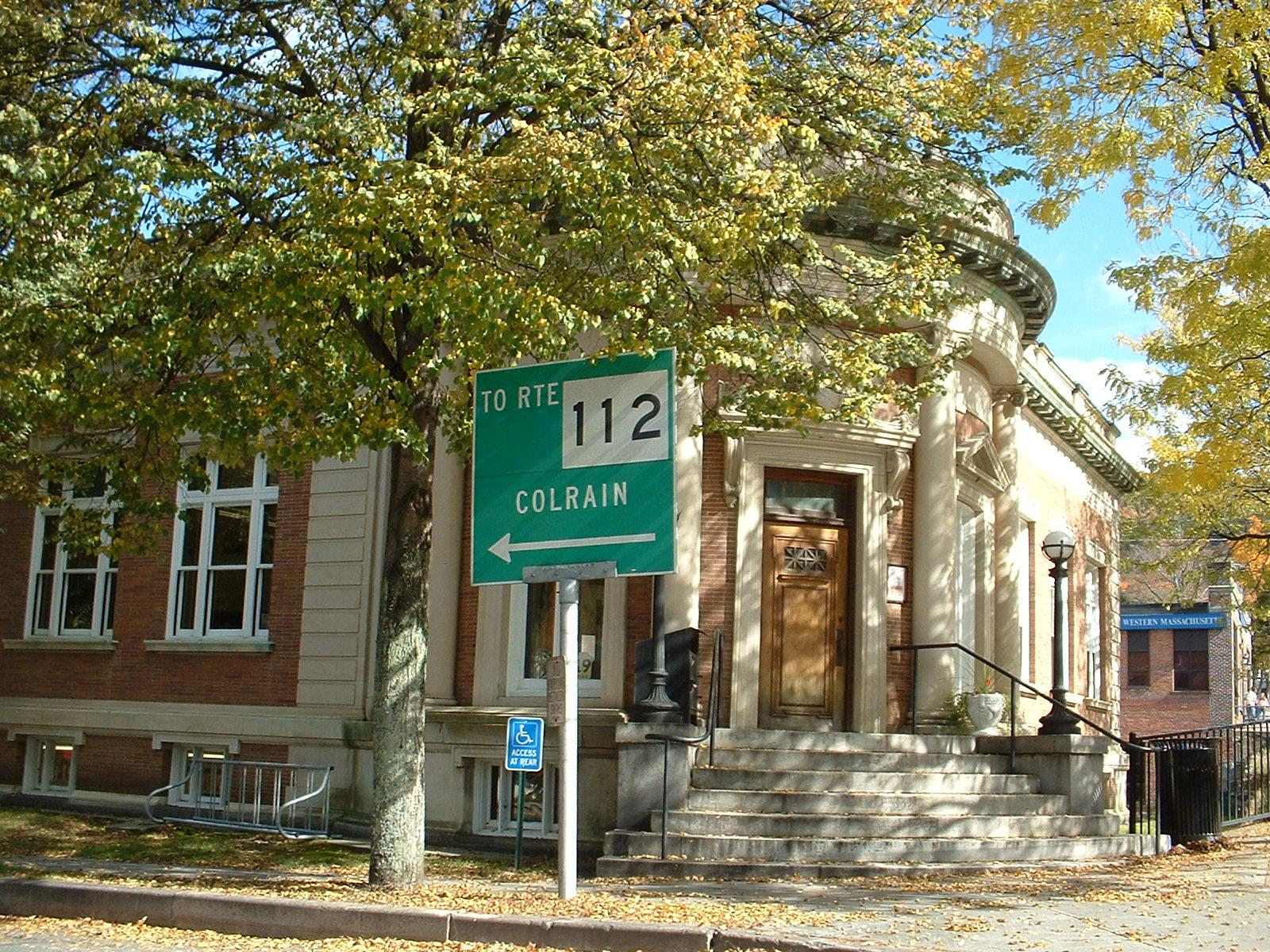
Arms Library

Shelburne employs the open town meeting form of government, and is led by a board of selectmen. All of the town offices, except for the Shelburne Volunteer Fire Department, are located within the area of Shelburne Falls, including the police department (which shares the town hall), a post office (which also serves the Buckland side of Shelburne Falls), and the Arms Library, which is connected to the regional library networks. The town's main cemetery, Arms Cemetery, is also located near Shelburne Falls. The nearest hospital, Franklin Medical Center, is located in Greenfield, as are most of the nearest state offices.

On the state level, Shelburne is represented in the Massachusetts House of Representatives as part of the Second Berkshire district, represented by Paul Mark, which covers central Berkshire County, as well as portions of Hampshire and Franklin Counties. In the Massachusetts Senate, the town is part of the Hampshire and Franklin district, represented by Stan Rosenberg, which includes most of eastern Franklin County and much of eastern Hampshire County. The town is home to the Second Barracks of Troop "B" of the Massachusetts State Police.

On the national level, Shelburne is represented in the United States House of Representatives as part of Massachusetts's 1st congressional district, and has been represented by Richard Neal of Worcester since January 2013. Massachusetts is represented in the United States Senate by senior Senator Elizabeth Warren and junior Senator Ed Markey.

== Education ==
Shelburne is a member of the Mohawk Trail / Hawlemont Regional School District, which covers six towns on the elementary level and the majority of western Franklin County on the upper levels of education. Buckland-Shelburne Regional Elementary School serves students from pre-kindergarten through sixth grades for the two towns, and students from grades 7–12 attend Mohawk Trail Regional High School in Buckland. There are several private, religious and charter schools located in the Greenfield area, with the most prominent being Deerfield Academy in Deerfield, Northfield Mount Hermon School in Gill and the Academy at Charlemont in Charlemont.

The nearest community college, Greenfield Community College, is located in Greenfield. The nearest state college is Massachusetts College of Liberal Arts in North Adams, and the nearest state university is the University of Massachusetts Amherst. The nearest private colleges, including members of the Five Colleges and Seven Sisters, are located southeast in the Northampton area.

The town is a supporter of the Peaceful Solution Character Education Program.

== Notable people ==
- Cady Coleman
- William Henry "Bill" Cosby Jr.
- Camille Hanks Cosby
- Augustus O. Dole
- Mary Phylinda Dole
- Silas Lamson
- Josh Simpson
