= Plainfield, Massachusetts =

Town in Massachusetts, United States

- Town
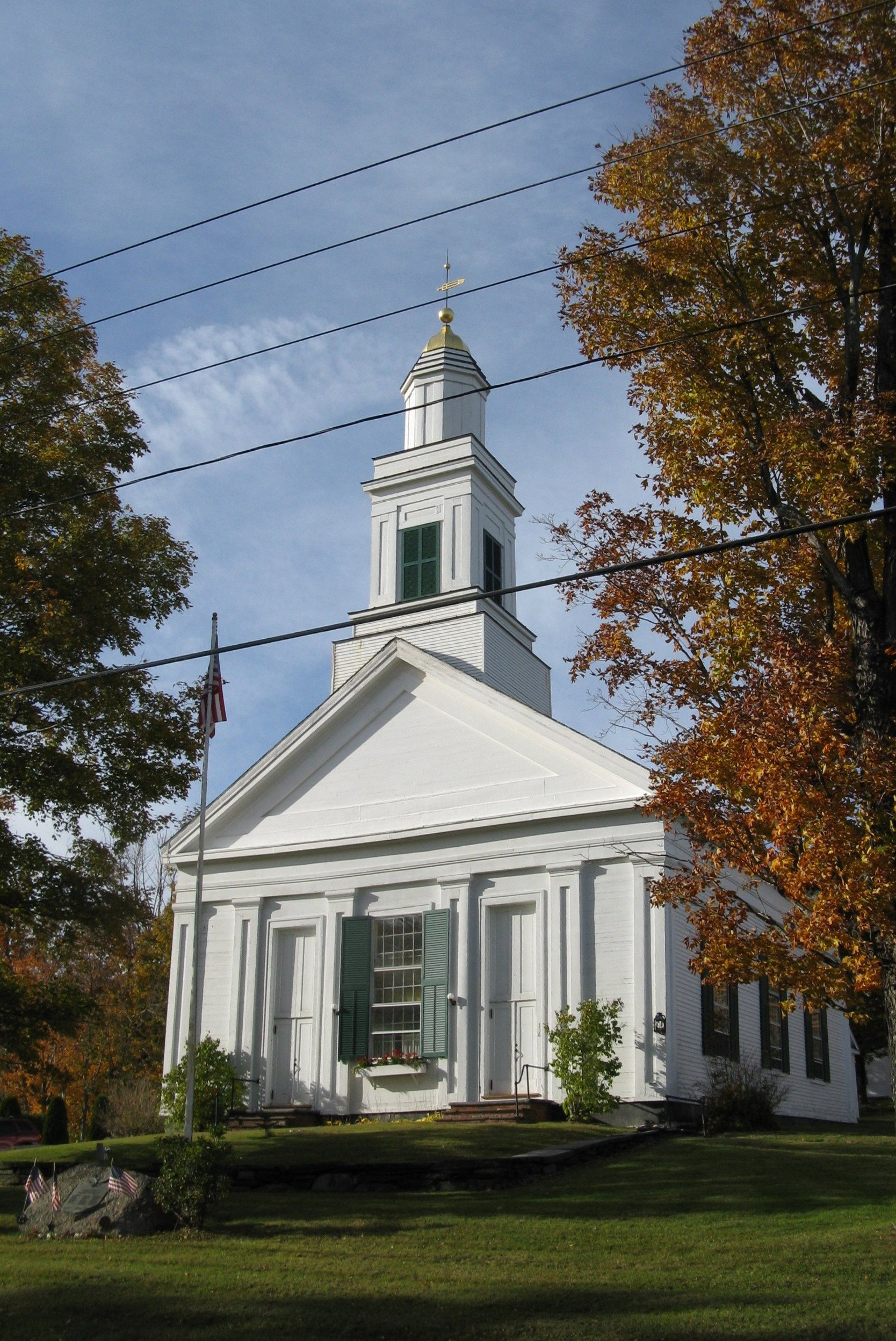
- Plainfield Congregational Church

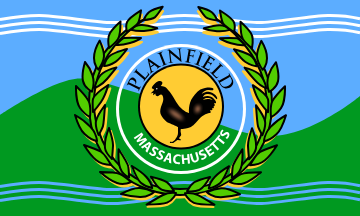
- Flag Seal

- Location in Hampshire County in Massachusetts
- Coordinates: 42°30′55″N 72°55′00″W
- Country: United States
- State: Massachusetts
- County: Hampshire
- Settled: 1770
- Incorporated: 1807

Government
  - Type: Open town meeting

Area
  - Total: 21.3 sq mi (55.1 km^{2})
  - Land: 21.0 sq mi (54.5 km^{2})
  - Water: 0.19 sq mi (0.5 km^{2})
- Elevation: 1,677 ft (511 m)

Population (2020)
  - Total: 633
  - Density: 30.1/sq mi (11.6/km^{2})
- Time zone: UTC−5 (Eastern)
  - Summer (DST): UTC−4 (Eastern)
- ZIP Codes: 01070 (Plainfield); 01026 (Cummington)
- Area code: 413
- FIPS code: 25-54030
- GNIS feature ID: 0618206
- Website: plainfield-ma.us

Plainfield is a town on the northwestern edge of Hampshire County, Massachusetts, United States, about 25 miles east of Pittsfield and 30 miles northwest of Northampton. The population was 633 at the 2020 census. It is part of the Springfield, Massachusetts Metropolitan Statistical Area.

== History ==
Plainfield was first settled in 1770, primarily by settlers from the town of Bridgewater, and was officially incorporated as a district within the Town of Cummington in 1785, and as a town on June 15, 1807. Plainfield is the youngest town in Hampshire County.

In the 1800s, Plainfield was a thriving agricultural community, primarily producing sheep and leather for tanning. With the widespread adoption of the steamship, and the resultant globalization in the 1870s, the expense of importing both mutton and leather from Australia and New Zealand was greatly reduced. Consequently, the agricultural industries in Plainfield became less profitable, and the population declined substantially over the following decades.

Sixty-one men from Plainfield joined the Union Army late in the Civil War. Six were killed in battle, or died as a consequence of their service, including resident Michael Bashaw, who died of dysentery at the battle of Wilson's Creek. Of those who survived, many settled elsewhere after the war.

After over a century of population decline, modern Plainfield has experienced population growth since 1950.

== Geography ==
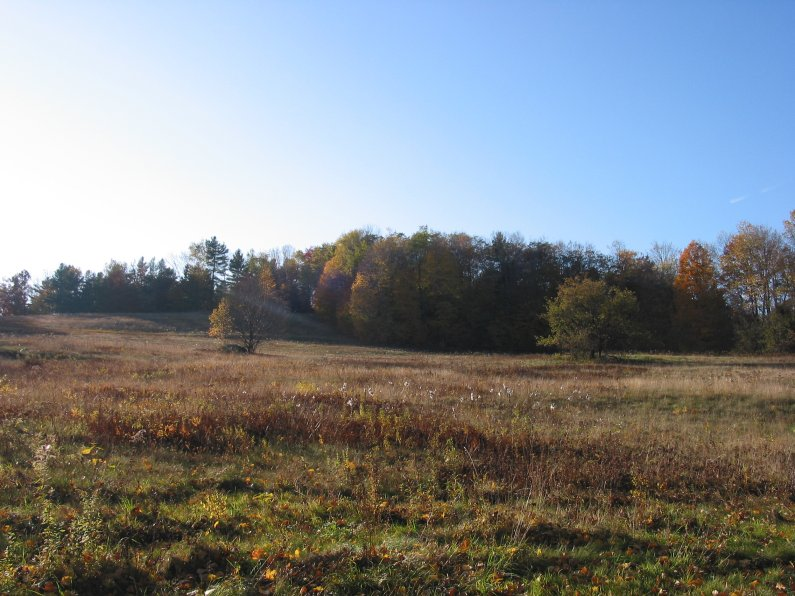
A typical field in Plainfield

The Town of Plainfield is situated in the scenic Berkshire Highlands where Hampshire County merges into neighboring Franklin and Berkshire Counties. Plainfield is part of the Hilltowns of Western Massachusetts.

Plainfield sits 1620′ above sea level, and the peaks of West Mountain (at 2125') are the highest elevation in Hampshire County.

According to the United States Census Bureau, the town has a total area of 21.3 square miles (55 km^{2}), of which 21.0 square miles (54 km^{2}) is land and 0.2 square miles (0.52 km^{2}) (0.99%) is water.

Plainfield's waterways serve as the headwaters of the Westfield and Deerfield rivers.

Plainfield is bordered by the towns of Cummington, Ashfield, Hawley, Savoy, and Windsor.

== Demographics ==
Historical population
Year	Pop.	±%
1790	458	—
1850	814	+77.7%
1860	639	−21.5%
1870	521	−18.5%
1880	457	−12.3%
1890	435	−4.8%
1900	404	−7.1%
1910	406	+0.5%
1920	332	−18.2%
1930	300	−9.6%
1940	264	−12.0%
1950	228	−13.6%
1960	237	+3.9%
1970	287	+21.1%
1980	425	+48.1%
1990	571	+34.4%
2000	589	+3.2%
2010	648	+10.0%
2020	633	−2.3%
2024*	649	+2.5%
* = population estimate. Source: United States census records and Population Estimates Program data.

As of the census of 2000, there were 589 people, 243 households, and 166 families residing in the town. The population density was 28.0 inhabitants per square mile (10.8/km^{2}). There were 311 housing units at an average density of 14.8 per square mile (5.7/km^{2}). The racial makeup of the town was 98.13% White, 0.34% Native American, 0.17% Asian, and 1.36% from two or more races. Hispanic or Latino of any race were 0.68% of the population.

There were 243 households, out of which 31.3% had children under the age of 18 living with them, 60.9% were married couples living together, 4.5% had a female householder with no husband present, and 31.3% were non-families. Of all households, 25.9% were made up of individuals, and 10.3% had someone living alone who was 65 years of age or older. The average household size was 2.42 and the average family size was 2.92.

In the town, the population was spread out, with 24.8% under the age of 18, 4.2% from 18 to 24, 26.1% from 25 to 44, 31.9% from 45 to 64, and 12.9% who were 65 years of age or older. The median age was 42 years. For every 100 females, there were 94.4 males. For every 100 females age 18 and over, there were 99.5 males.

The median income for a household in the town was $37,250, and the median income for a family was $46,042. Males had a median income of $31,625 versus $26,875 for females. The per capita income for the town was $20,785. About 4.8% of families and 8.0% of the population were below the poverty line, including 4.9% of those under age 18 and none of those age 65 or over.

== Government ==
Plainfield is governed by a town meeting open to all registered voters in the town. Ongoing town matters are managed by an elected board of selectmen and other boards and commissions. The town is part of the First Hampshire District in the Massachusetts House of Representatives, represented by Lindsay Sabadosa, and the Berkshire, Franklin, and Hampshire Senate district, represented by Adam G. Hinds.

== Notable people ==
- Erastus Newton Bates, Illinois and Minnesota legislator
- John Brown (1800–1859), abolitionist who played a role in starting the Civil War
- William Cullen Bryant (1794–1878), poet, philosopher
- Ralph Ellison, African-American novelist, literary critic, scholar and writer
- Martha J. Lamb, author, historian
- Charles McCarry (born 1930), author of more than ten novels and numerous works of non-fiction
- James Naismith, inventor of basketball
- Talcott Seelye, former United States Ambassador to Tunisia and Syria, Arabist
- Charles Dudley Warner, born in Plainfield in 1829, author, editor Hartford Courant
- Marcus Whitman (1802–1847), missionary physician

== Points of interest ==
- Plainfield Pond
- Deer Hill State Reservation
- Dubuque Memorial State Forest
- Shaw Hudson House; museum and historical home of note
- Old Millers site; one of eight mills on the Old Mill stream; Plainfield Historical Society.
