= Greenfield Community College =

Public college in Greenfield, Massachusetts, US

Coordinates: 42°35′58.55″N 72°37′51.91″W

- Motto: You Belong Here
- Type: Public community college
- Established: 1962
- Accreditation: NECHE
- President: Michelle Schutt
- Students: 1,800+
- Location: Greenfield, Massachusetts, United States
- Campus: Rural
- Nickname: GCC
- Website: www.gcc.mass.edu

Greenfield Community College (GCC) is a public community college in Greenfield, Massachusetts. It was founded in 1962 and is one of Massachusetts's 15 community colleges. The main campus, which comprises two buildings, is located in Greenfield, Massachusetts on a 107-acre property near the junction of Interstate 91 and Route 2. GCC students hail from Hampshire, Franklin, and Worcester Counties in Western Massachusetts, as well as southern Vermont and New Hampshire. Many of GCC's transfer students continue on at one of Hampshire County's Five Colleges, or to one of 14 Massachusetts State Universities. GCC is the largest source of transfer students to Smith College.

In fiscal year 2018, GCC had a student head count FTE (full-time equivalent) of 1,086, making it the second-smallest community college in the state of Massachusetts. Michelle Schutt is the college's 11th president as of July 2022. Greenfield Community College is accredited by the New England Commission of Higher Education.
