= Academy at Charlemont =

Private school in Charlemont, Massachusetts

Coordinates: 42°37′9.5″N 72°49′33.0″W

The Academy at Charlemont
- Type: Independent high school
- Established: 1981
- Affiliations: NAIS, AISNE, College Board, NEASC
- Students: 86
- Location: Charlemont, Massachusetts, USA
- Colors: Maroon and ivory
- Mascot: Aardvark
- Website: Official website
- Location within Massachusetts

The Academy at Charlemont is a small, private, college-preparatory day school, located on the Deerfield River in Charlemont, Massachusetts, that serves grade 6 through postgraduate. The school was founded by Eric Grinnell, Dianne Grinnell, David W. McKay, Patricia D. W. McKay, Margaret J. Carlson, and Lucille Joy in 1981 as an experiment in bringing classical and community-oriented education to rural Western Massachusetts—specifically Franklin County, Massachusetts.

== Notable alumni ==
- Bo Peabody 1990, co-founder and Managing General Partner of Village Ventures and Venture Partner at Greycroft Partners
- Sarah Hartshorne 2005, appeared on America's Next Top Model, Cycle 9
- Augustus Muller 2007, of Boy Harsher
- Abby Weems 2012, vocalist and guitarist of Potty Mouth
- Caden Ari Adair 2023, online content creator and musician by the alias of voidheir
- DJ Lucas, a rapper
