= Colrain =

Colrain may refer to

- Colrain, Massachusetts, a town in the United States
  - Colrain Center Historic District
- John Colrain (1937–1984), Scottish football player and manager
- Colrain Poetry Manuscript Conference, an American writers' conference

== See also ==
- Colerain (disambiguation)
- Coleraine (disambiguation)
