= Berkshire East =

Berkshire East may refer to:

- East Berkshire (UK Parliament constituency)
- Berkshire East Ski Area, a United States alpine ski area
