= Colerain =

Colerain may refer to a location in the United States:

- Colerain, North Carolina
- Colerain, Georgia, the location of a U.S. trading post for the Creek Nation in the 1790s
- Colerain Township (disambiguation), name of several townships

== See also ==
- Colrain (disambiguation)
- Coleraine (disambiguation)
