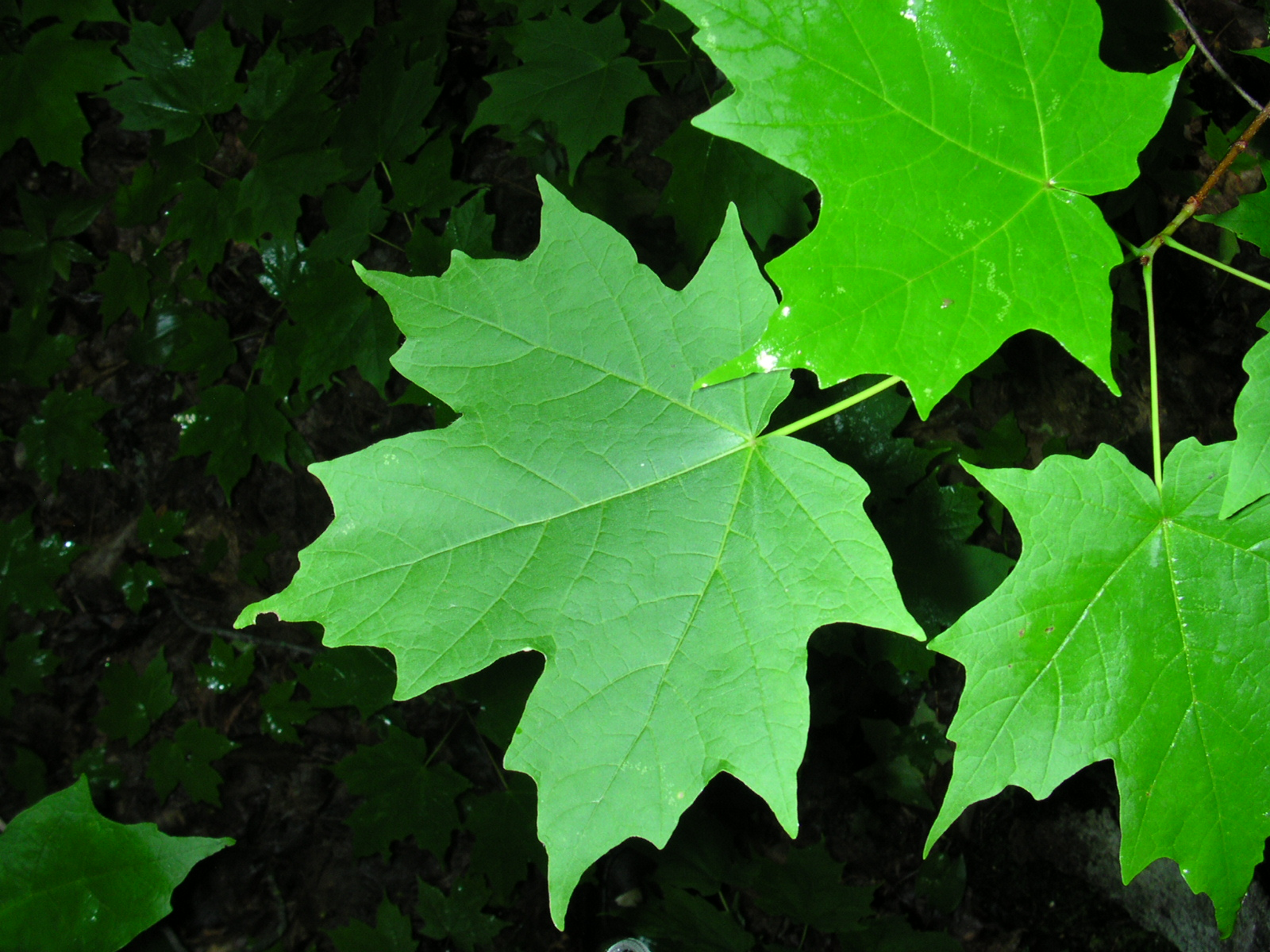

Conservation status
- Least Concern (IUCN 3.1)

- Secure (NatureServe)

Scientific classification
- Kingdom: Plantae
- Clade: Tracheophytes
- Clade: Angiosperms
- Clade: Eudicots
- Clade: Rosids
- Order: Sapindales
- Family: Sapindaceae
- Genus: Acer
- Section: Acer sect. Acer
- Series: Acer ser. Saccharodendron
- Species: A. saccharum

Binomial name
- Acer saccharum Marshall
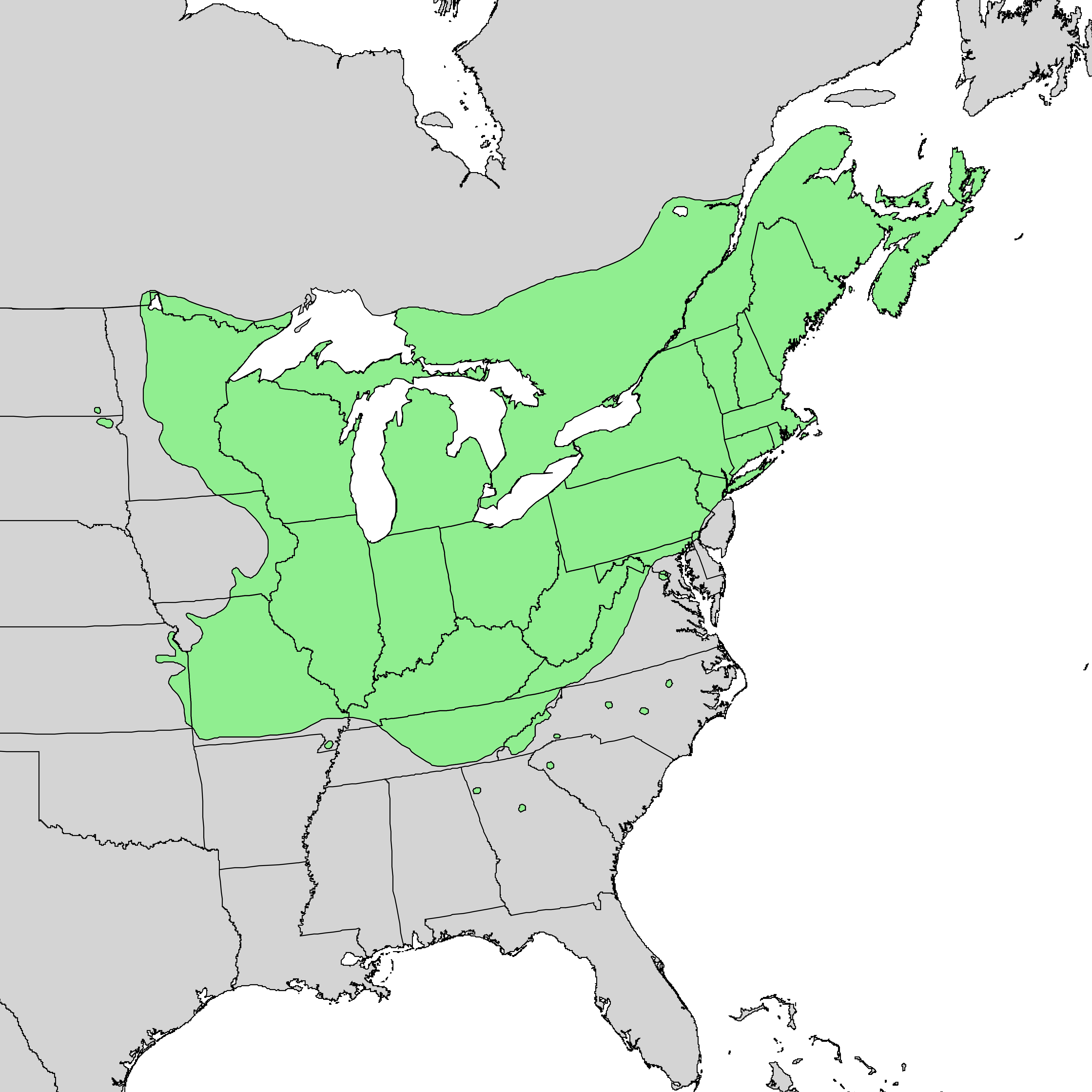
- Native range of Acer saccharum

Synonyms
- Acer barbatum auct. non Michx.; Acer barbatum f. commune Ashe; Acer floridanum (Chapm.) Pax; Acer hispidum Schwer.; Acer leucoderme Small; Acer nigrum F. Michx.; Acer nigrum var. glaucum (Schmidt) Fosberg; Acer nigrum subsp. saccharophorum (K.Koch) R.T.Clausen; Acer palmifolium Borkh.; Acer palmifolium var. concolor Schwer.; Acer palmifolium f. euconcolor Schwer.; Acer palmifolium f. glabratum Schwer.; Acer palmifolium f. glaucum (Pax) Schwer.; Acer palmifolium var. glaucum Sarg.; Acer palmifolium f. integrilobum Schwer.; Acer rugelii Pax; Acer saccharinum var. glaucum Pax; Acer saccharinum var. viride Schmidt; Acer saccharophorum K.Koch; Acer saccharophorum f. angustilobatum Vict. & J.Rousseau; Acer saccharophorum f. conicum (Fernald) J.Rousseau; Acer saccharophorum f. glaucum (Schmidt) J.Rousseau; Acer saccharophorum var. rugelii (Pax) J.Rousseau; Acer saccharophorum var. subvestitum Vict. & Roll.-Germ.; Acer saccharum f. angustilobatum (Vict. & J.Rousseau) A.E.Murray; Acer saccharum f. conicum Fernald; Acer saccharum f. euconcolor Pax; Acer saccharum f. glabratum Pax; Acer saccharum f. glaucum (Schmidt) Pax; Acer saccharum var. glaucum (Schmidt) Sarg.; Acer saccharum var. glaucum Pax; Acer saccharum f. hispidum (Schwer.) A.E.Murray; Acer saccharum f. integrilobum Pax; Acer saccharum f. pubescens Pax; Acer saccharum var. quinquelobulatum A.E.Murray; Acer saccharum f. rubrocarpum A.E.Murray; Acer saccharum f. subvestitum (Vict. & Roll.-Germ.) A.E.Murray; Acer saccharum f. truncatum Pax; Acer saccharum f. villipes (Rehder) A.E.Murray; Acer saccharum f. villosum Pax; Acer saccharum var. viride (Schmidt) A.E.Murray; Acer saccharophorum K.Koch; Acer skutchii Rehder; Acer subglaucum Bush; Acer subglaucum var. sinuosum Bush; Acer treleaseanum Bush; Saccharodendron saccharum (Marshall) Moldenke

= Acer saccharum =

Species of flowering plant

Acer saccharum, the sugar maple, is a species of flowering plant in the soapberry and lychee family, Sapindaceae. It may also be called rock maple, sugar tree, sweet maple, or, particularly in reference to the wood, hard maple.

Sugar maple is native to the hardwood forests of eastern North America. It is best known for being the primary source of maple syrup.

== Description ==
Acer saccharum is a deciduous tree normally reaching heights of 25–35 metres (80–115 ft), and exceptionally up to 45 m (150 ft). A 10-year-old tree is typically about 5 m (20 ft) tall. As with most trees, forest-grown sugar maples form a much taller trunk and narrower canopy than open-growth ones.

The leaves are up to 20 centimetres (8 in) long and wide, palmate, with five lobes and borne in opposite pairs. The basal lobes are relatively small, while the upper lobes are larger and deeply notched. In contrast with the angular notching of the silver maple, however, the notches tend to be rounded at their interior. The fall color is often spectacular, ranging from bright yellow on some trees through orange to fluorescent red-orange on others. Sugar maples also have a tendency to color unevenly in fall. In some trees, all colors above can be seen at the same time. They also share a tendency with red maples for certain parts of a mature tree to change color weeks ahead of or behind the remainder of the tree. The leaf buds are pointy and brown-colored. The recent year's growth twigs are green, and turn dark brown.

The flowers are in panicles of five to ten together, yellow-green and without petals; flowering occurs in early spring after 30–55 growing degree days. The sugar maple will generally begin flowering when it is between 10 and 200 years old. The fruit is a pair of samaras (winged seeds). The seeds are globose, 7–10 mm (9/32–13/32 in) in diameter, the wing 2–3 cm (3/4–1 1/4 in) long. The seeds fall from the tree in autumn, where they must be exposed to 45 days of temperatures below 4 °C (39 °F) to break their coating down. Germination of A. saccharum is slow, not taking place until the following spring when the soil has warmed and all frost danger is past.

=== Similar species ===
It is closely related to the black maple, which is sometimes included in this species, but sometimes separated as Acer nigrum. The western sugar maple (Acer grandidentatum) and southern sugar maple (Acer floridanum) are also treated as a varieties or subspecies of northern sugar maple by some botanists.

The sugar maple can be confused with the Norway maple, which is not native to America but is commonly planted in cities and suburbs, and they are not closely related within the genus. The sugar maple is most easily identified by clear sap in the leaf petiole (the Norway maple has white sap), brown, sharp-tipped buds (the Norway maple has blunt, green or reddish-purple buds), and shaggy bark on older trees (the Norway maple bark has small grooves). Also, the leaf lobes of the sugar maple have a more triangular shape, in contrast to the squarish lobes of the Norway maple.

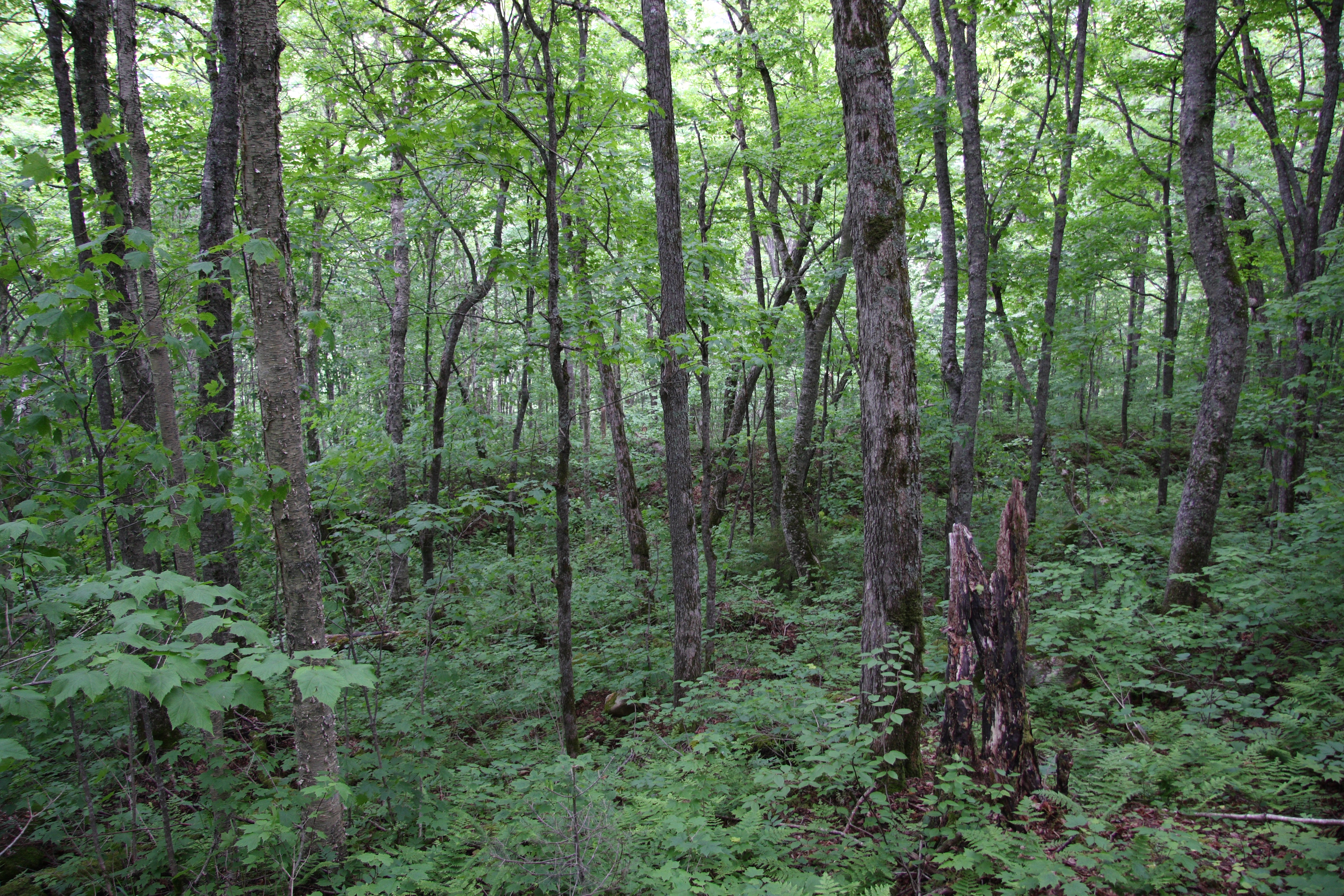
Sugar maple-yellow birch forest, Jacques-Cartier National Park, Quebec, Canada

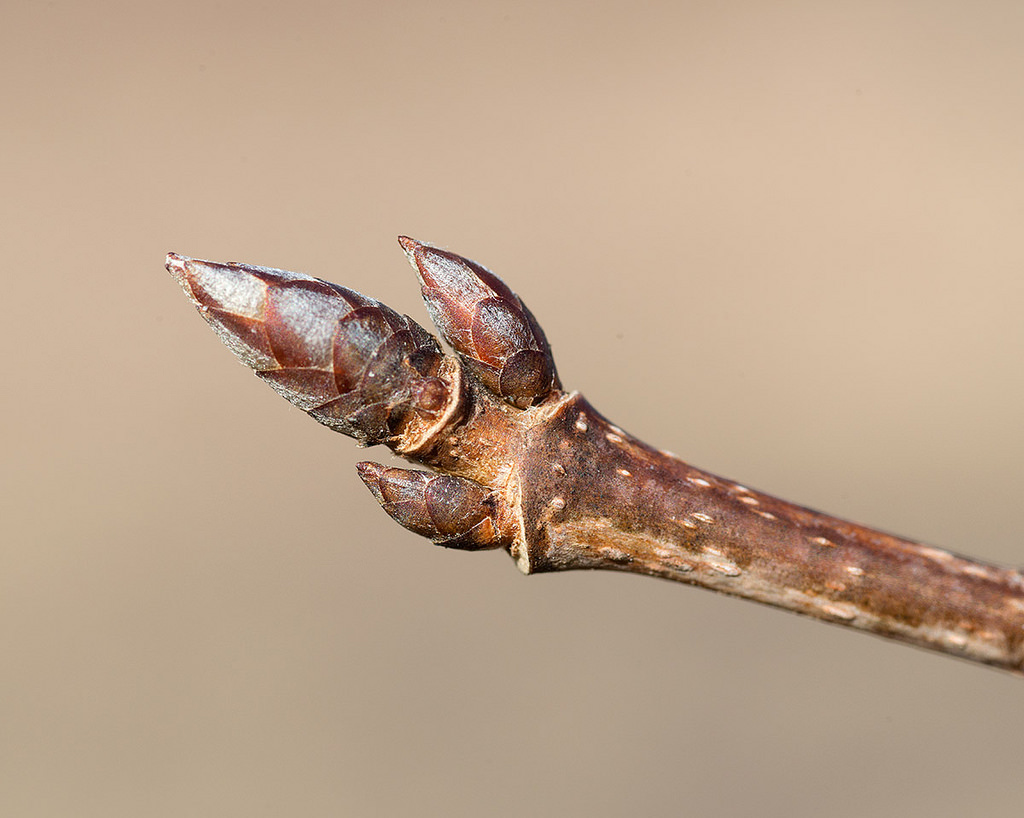
Sugar maple terminal bud

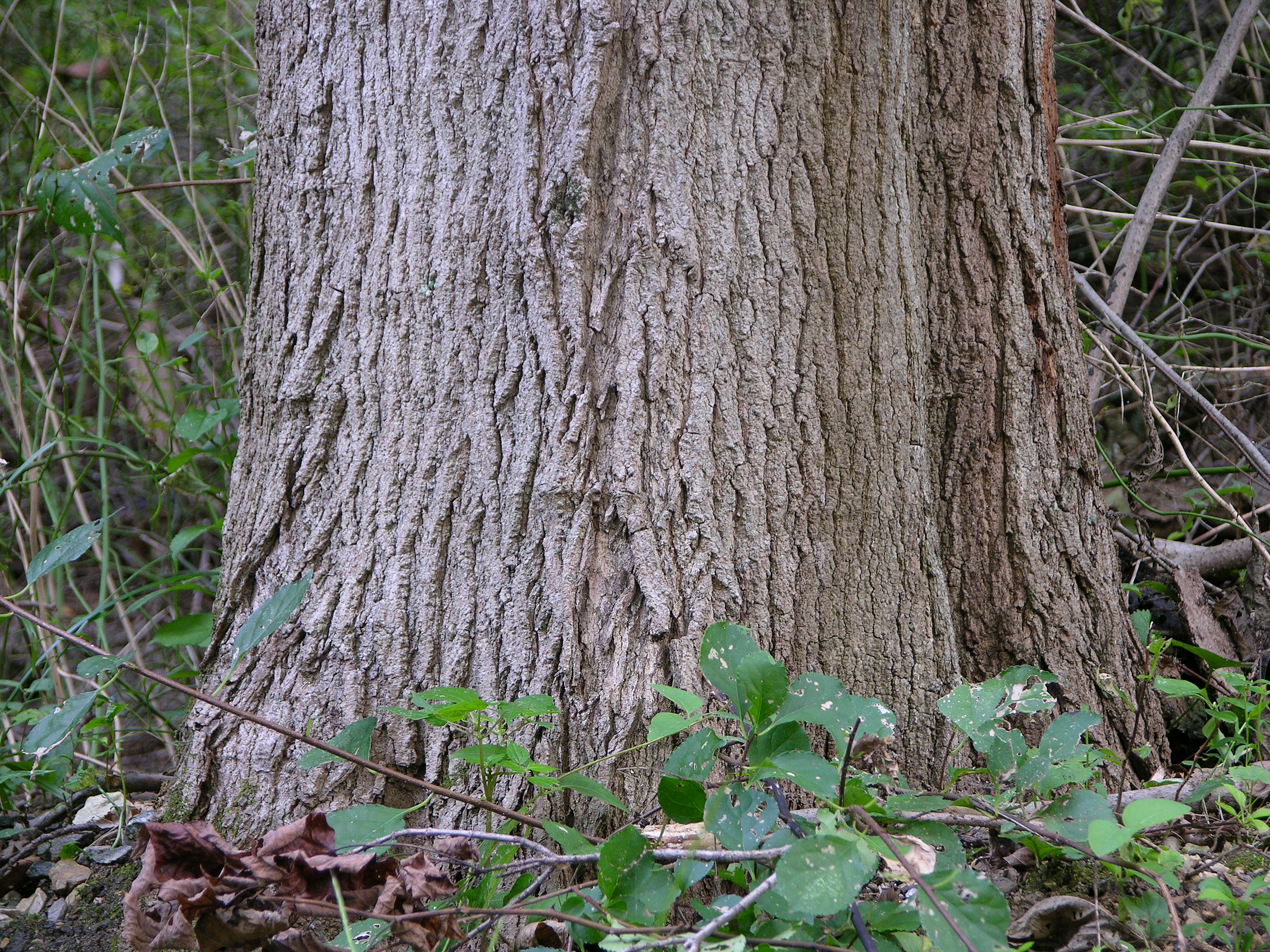
Bark

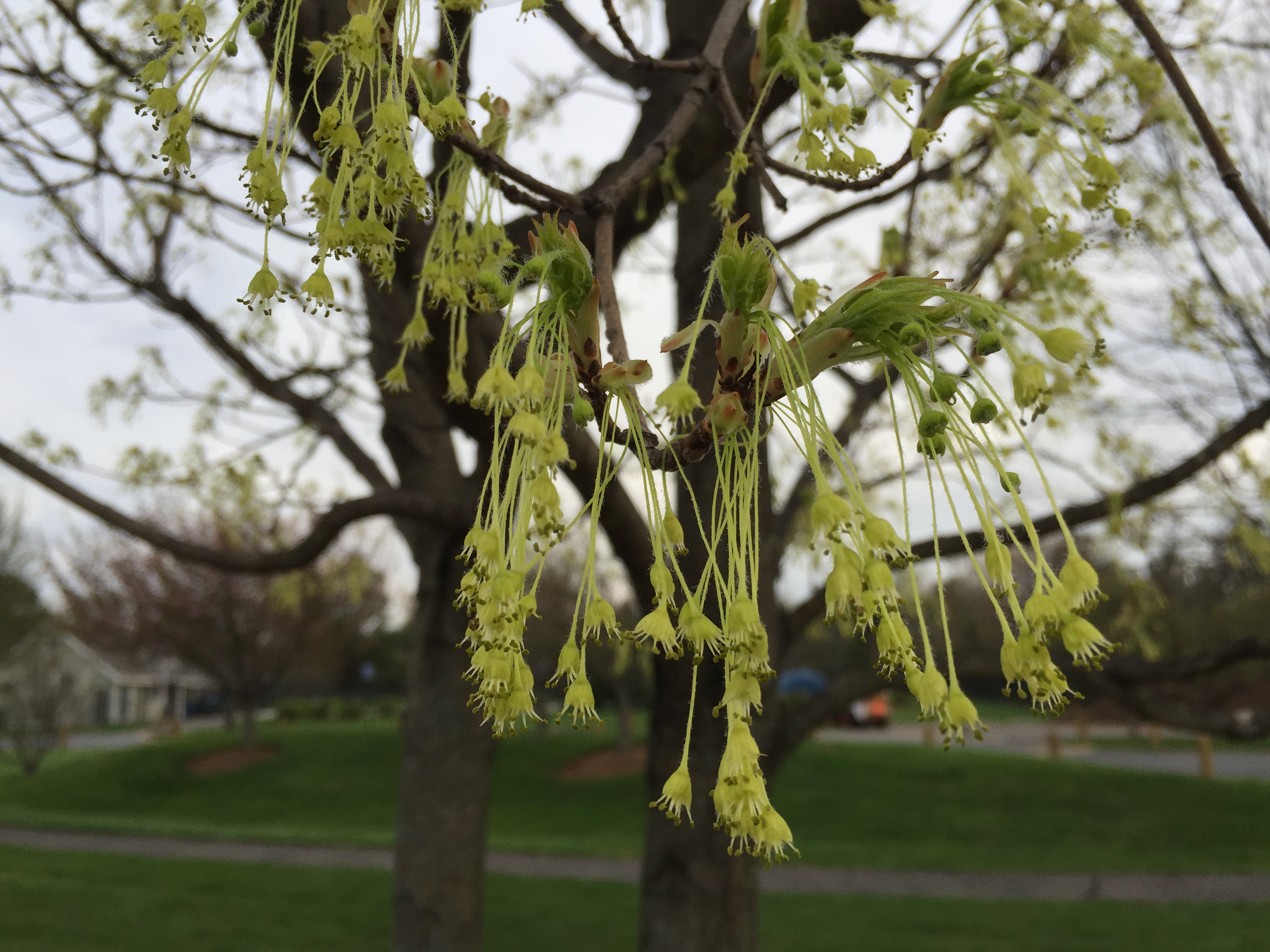
Flowers in spring

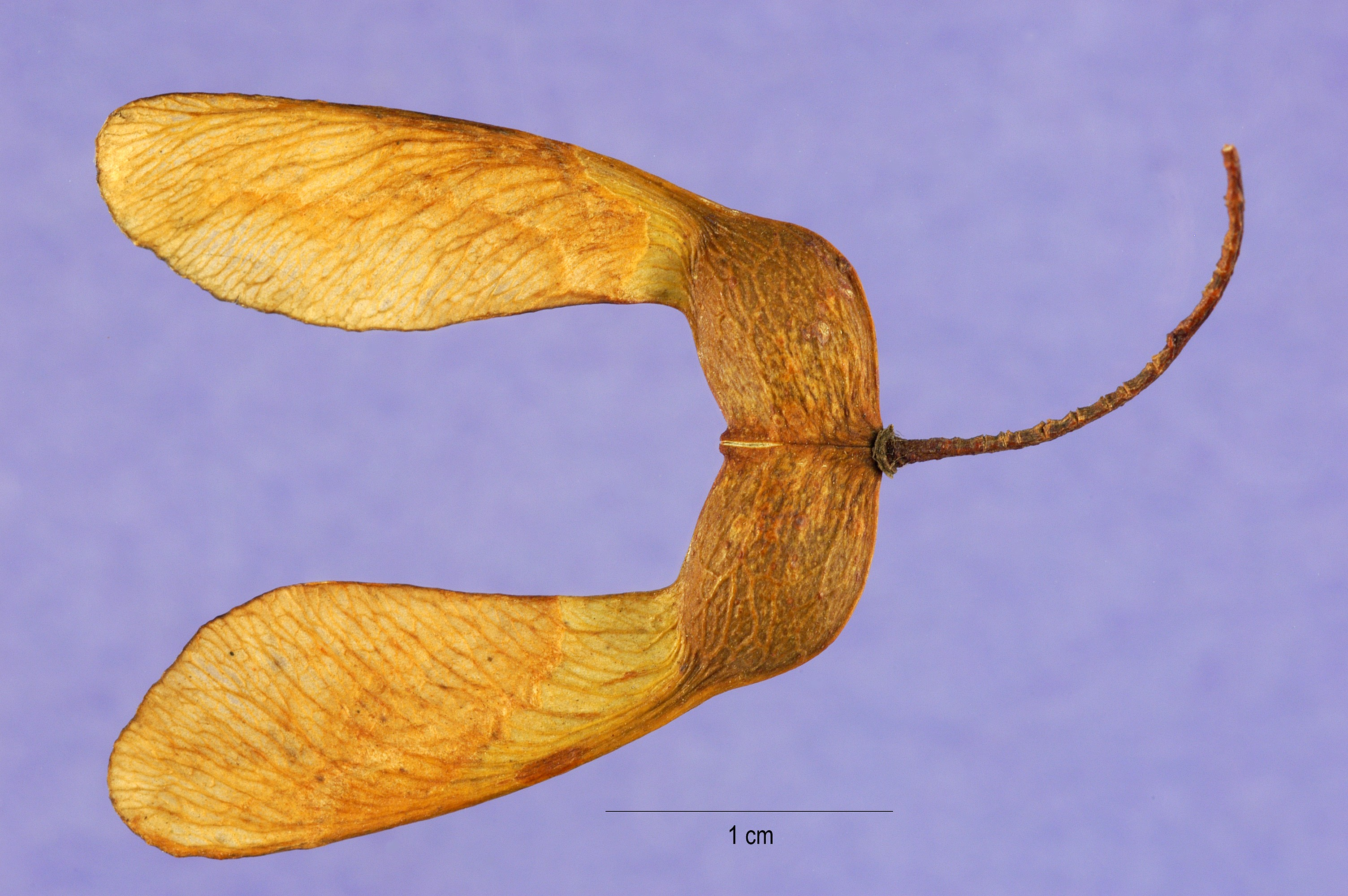
A pair of samaras

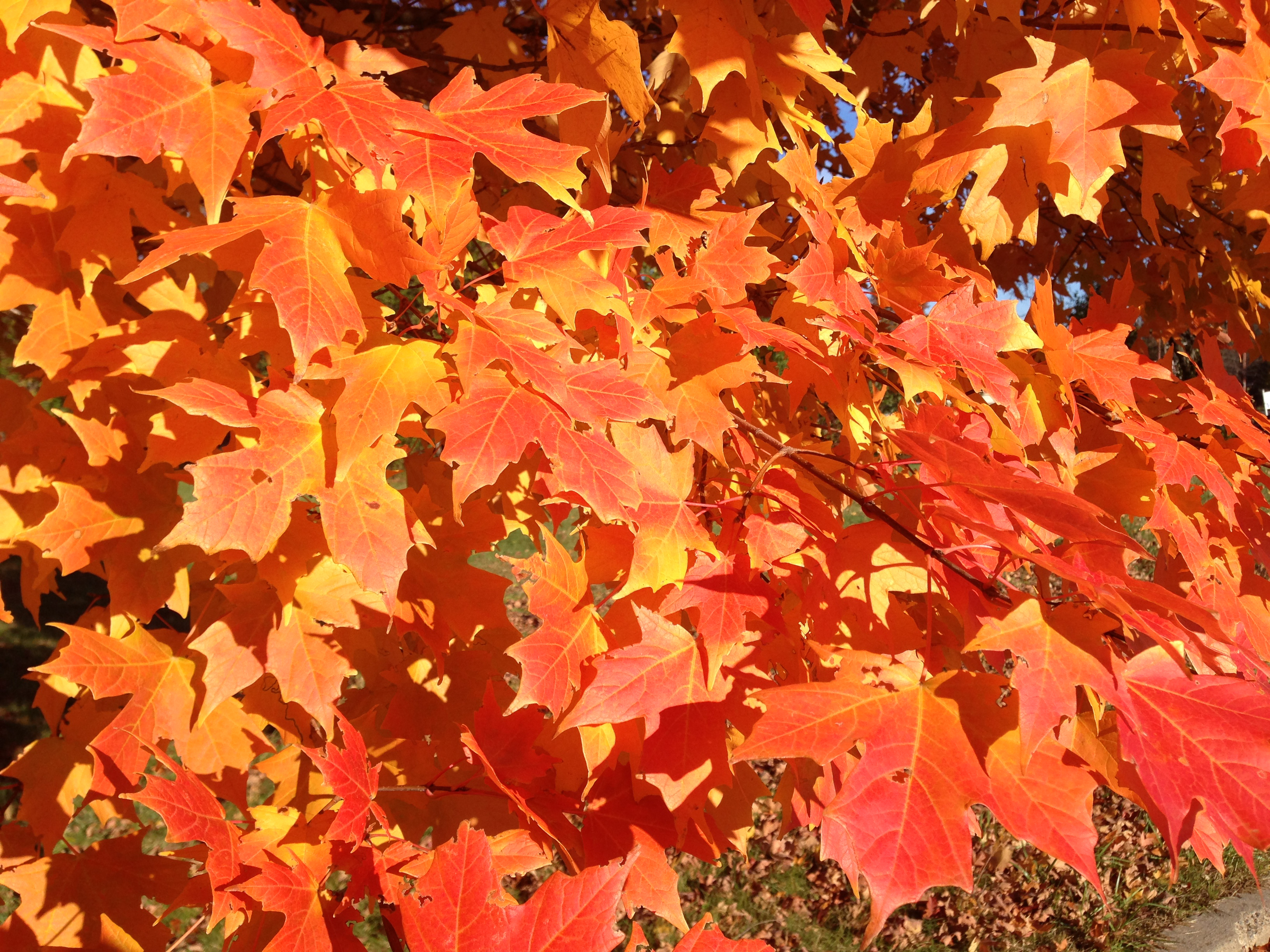
Closeup of autumn foliage

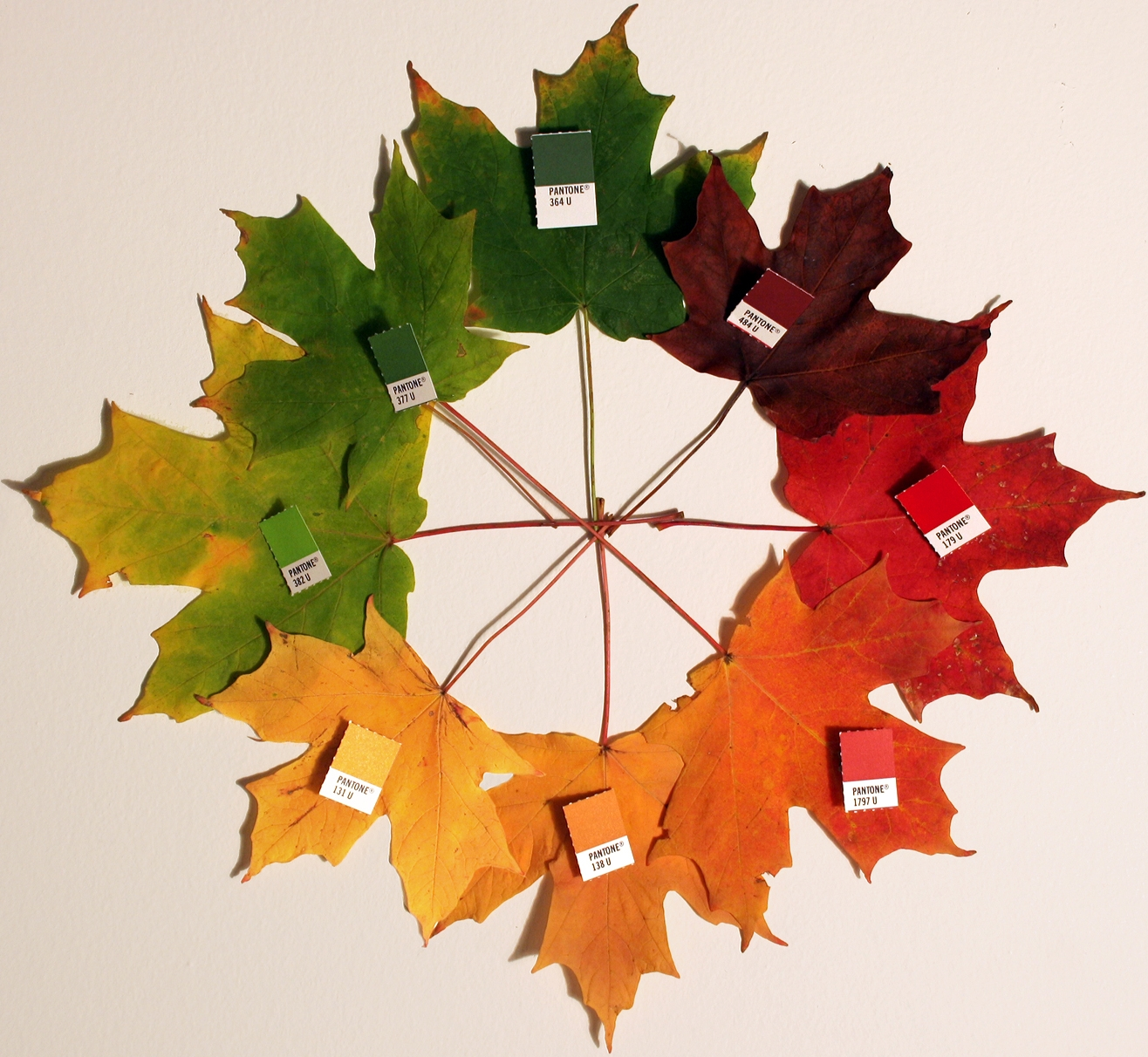
Seasonal leaf color change

== Distribution and habitat ==
It is native to the hardwood forests of eastern Canada and the eastern United States.

== Ecology ==
The sugar maple is an extremely important species to the ecology of many forests in the northern U.S. and Canada. Pure stands are common, and it is a major component of the northern and Midwestern U.S. hardwood forests. Due to its need for cold winters, sugar maple is mostly found north of the 42nd parallel in USDA growing zones 3–5. It is less common in the southern part of its range (USDA Zone 6) where summers are hot and humid; there sugar maple is confined to ravines and moist flatlands. In the east, south of Maryland, it is limited to the Appalachians. In the west, Tennessee represents the southern limit of its range and Missouri its southwestern limit. Collection of sap for sugar is also not possible in the southern part of sugar maple's range as winter temperatures do not become cold enough.

The minimum seed-bearing age of sugar maple is about 30 years. The tree is long-lived, typically 200 years and occasionally as much as 300.

Sugar maple is native to areas with cooler climates and requires a hard freeze each winter for proper dormancy. In northern parts of its range, January temperatures average about −18 °C (0 °F) and July temperatures about 16 °C (61 °F); in southern parts, January temperatures average about 10 °C (50 °F) and July temperatures average almost 27 °C (81 °F). Seed germination also requires extremely low temperatures, the optimal being just slightly above freezing, and no other known tree species has this property. Germination of sugar maple seed in temperatures above 50 °F (10 °C) is rare to nonexistent.

Acer saccharum is among the most shade tolerant of large deciduous trees, and very old trees in second-growth settings can grow large even in the understory for many years. Its shade tolerance is exceeded only by the striped maple, a smaller tree. Like other maples, its shade tolerance is manifested in its ability to germinate and persist under a closed canopy as an understory plant, and respond with rapid growth to the increased light formed by a gap in the canopy. Sugar maple can tolerate virtually any soil type short of pure sand, but does not tolerate xeric (desert) or swampy conditions.

Sugar maples are deeper-rooted than most maples and engage in hydraulic lift, drawing water from lower soil layers and exuding that water into upper, drier soil layers. This not only benefits the tree itself, but also many other plants growing around it.

The mushroom Pholiota squarrosoides is known to decay the logs of the tree.

Human influences have contributed to the decline of the sugar maple in many regions. Its role as a species of mature forests has led it to be replaced by more opportunistic species in areas where forests are cut over. The sugar maple also exhibits a greater susceptibility to pollution than other species of maple. Acid rain and soil acidification are some of the primary contributing factors to maple decline. Also, the increased use of salt over the last several decades on streets and roads for deicing purposes has decimated the sugar maple's role as a street tree.

In some parts of New England, particularly near urbanized areas, the sugar maple is being displaced by the Norway maple. The Norway maple is also highly shade tolerant, but is considerably more tolerant of urban conditions, resulting in the sugar maple's replacement in those areas. In addition, Norway maple produces much larger crops of seeds, allowing it to out-compete native species.

== Cultivation and uses ==
=== Maple syrup and other food use ===
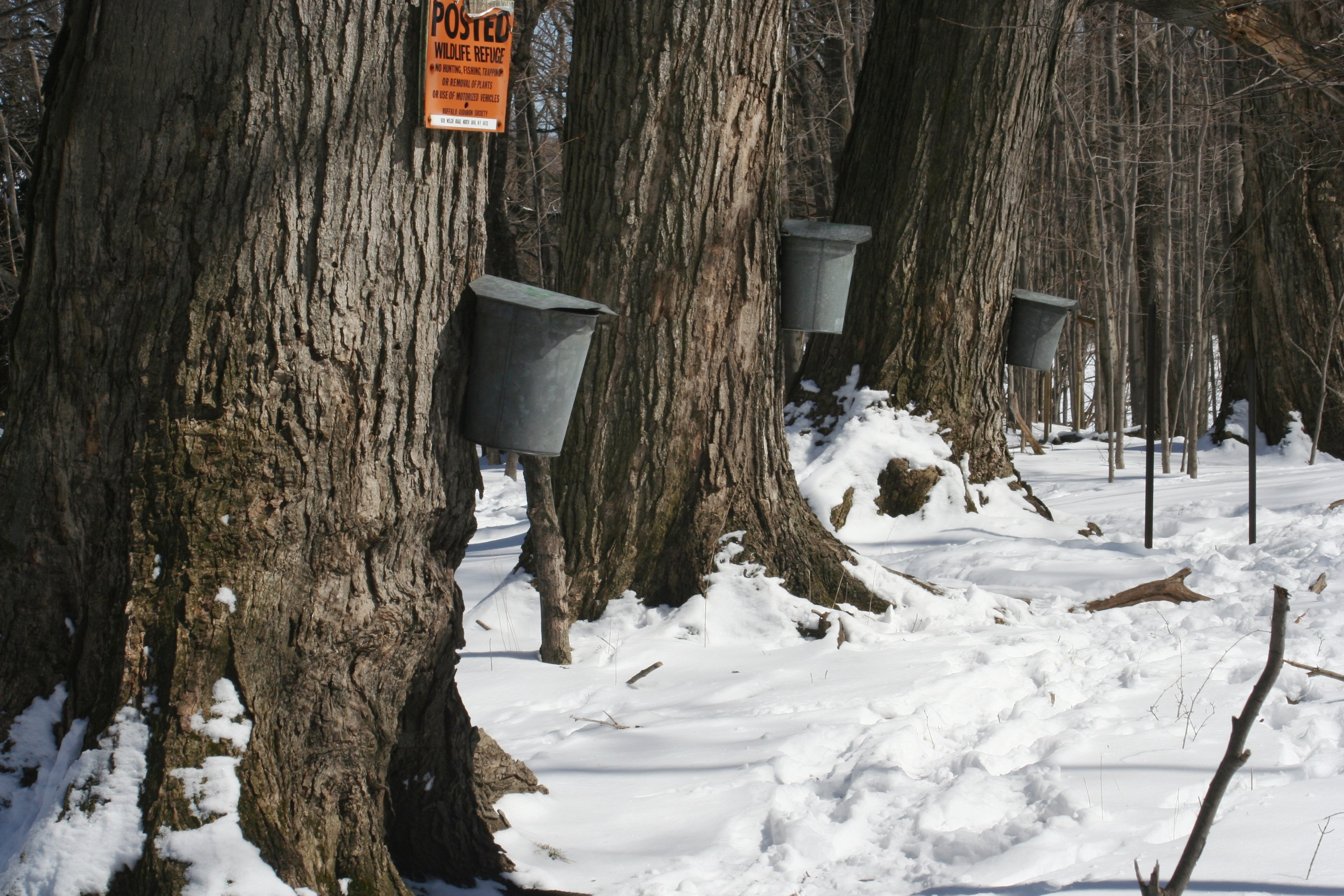
Collecting sap from sugar maples

The sugar maple is one of the most important Canadian trees, being, along with black maple, the major source of sap for making maple syrup. Other maple species can be used as a sap source for maple syrup, but some have lower sugar content and/or produce more cloudy syrup than these two. In maple syrup production from A. saccharum, the sap is extracted from the trees using a tap placed into a hole drilled through the phloem, just inside the bark. The collected sap is then boiled. As the sap boils, the water evaporates and the syrup is left behind. Forty gallons of maple sap produces 1 gallon of syrup. In the southern part of their range, sugar maples produce little sap; syrup production is dependent on the tree growing in cooler climates.

Additionally, the samaras (seeds) can be soaked, and—with their wings removed—boiled, seasoned, and roasted to make them edible. The young leaves and inner bark can be eaten either raw or cooked.

=== Timber ===
The sapwood can be white, and smaller logs may have a higher proportion of this desirable wood. Bowling alleys and bowling pins are both commonly manufactured from sugar maple. Trees with wavy wood grain, which can occur in curly, quilted, and "birdseye maple" forms, are especially valued. Maple is also the wood used for basketball courts, including the floors used by the NBA, and it is a popular wood for baseball bats, along with white ash. In recent years, because white ash has become threatened by emerald ash borer, sugar maple wood has increasingly displaced ash for baseball bat production. It is also widely used in the manufacture of musical instruments, such as the members of the violin family (sides and back), guitars (neck), grand pianos (rim), and drum shells. It is also often used in the manufacture of sporting goods.

Canadian maple, often referred to as "Canadian hardrock maple", is prized for pool cues, especially the shafts. Some production-line cues will use lower-quality maple wood with cosmetic issues, such as "sugar marks", which are most often light brown discolorations caused by sap in the wood. The best shaft wood has a very consistent grain, with no marks or discoloration. Sugar marks usually do not affect how the cue plays, but are not as high quality as those without it. The wood is also used in skateboards, gunstocks, and flooring for its strength. Canadian hardrock maple is also used in the manufacture of electric guitar necks due to its high torsional stability and the bright, crisp resonant tone it produces. If the grain is curly, with flame or quilt patterns, it is usually reserved for more expensive instruments. In high-end guitars this wood is sometimes torrefied to cook out the lignin resins, allowing the greater stability to climate and environmental changes, and to enhance its tonal characteristics as the instrument's resonance is more evenly distributed across the cellulose structure of the wood without the lignin.

Specially figured lumber made from the species is known as "birds-eye maple", or "curly maple".

=== Urban planting ===
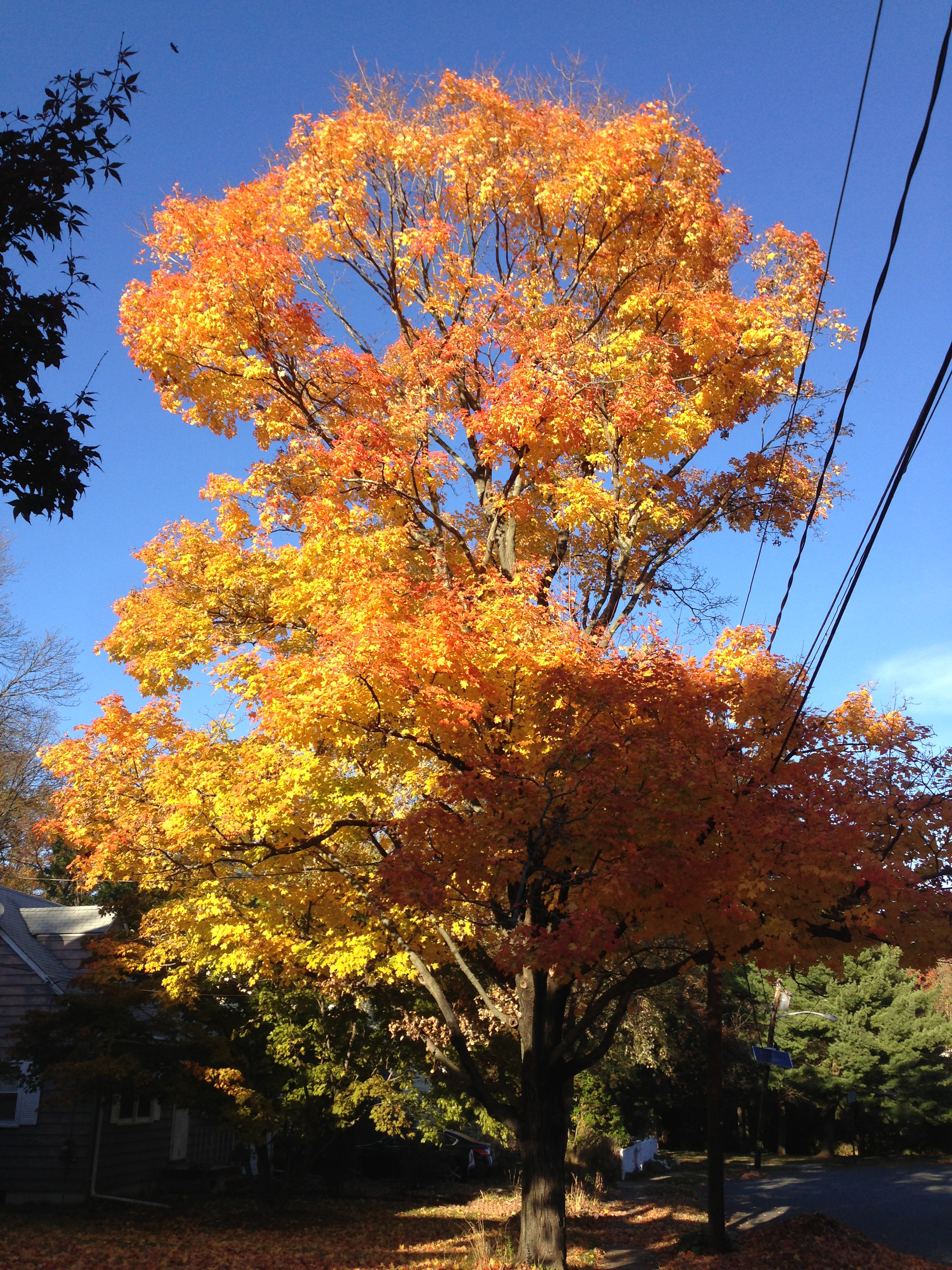
Sugar maple in a suburban landscape

Sugar maple was a favourite street and park tree during the 19th century because it was easy to propagate and transplant, is fairly fast-growing, and has a beautiful autumn colour. However, it proved too delicate to continue in that role after the rise of automobile-induced pollution and was replaced by Norway maple and other hardier species. It is intolerant of road salt. Sugar maples are commonly planted as a street tree in cities within the Mountain states region of the U.S., usually a different cultivar such as the 'Legacy' sugar maple. The northernmost sugar maple cultivated in Canada is at Yellowknife.

The shade and the shallow, fibrous roots may interfere with grass growing under the trees. Deep, well-drained loam is the best rooting medium, although sugar maples can grow well on sandy soil which has a good buildup of humus. Light (or loose) clay soils are also well known to support sugar maple growth. Poorly drained areas are unsuitable, and the species is especially short-lived on flood-prone clay flats. Its salt tolerance is low and it is very sensitive to boron. The species is also subject to defoliation when there are dense populations of larvae of Lepidoptera species like the rosy maple moth (Dryocampa rubicunda).

==== Cultivars ====
- 'Apollo' – columnar
- 'Arrowhead' – pyramidal crown
- 'Astis' ('Steeple') – heat-tolerant, good in southeastern United States, oval crown
- 'Bonfire' – fast growing
- 'Caddo' – naturally occurring southern ecotype or subspecies, from Southwestern Oklahoma, great drought and heat tolerance, good choice for the Great Plains region
- 'Columnare' ('Newton Sentry') – very narrow
- 'Fall Fiesta' – tough-leaved, colorful in season, above-average hardiness
- 'Goldspire' – columnar with yellow-orange fall color
- 'Green Mountain' (PNI 0285) – durable foliage resists heat and drought, oval crown, above-average hardiness
- 'Inferno' – possibly the hardiest cultivar, with more red fall color than 'Lord Selkirk' or 'Unity'
- 'Legacy' – tough, vigorous and popular
- 'Lord Selkirk' – very hardy, more upright than other northern cultivars
- 'Monumentale' – columnar
- 'September Flare' - very hardy, early orange-red fall color
- 'Sweet Shadow' – lacy foliage
- 'Temple's Upright' – almost as narrow as 'Columnare'
- 'Unity' – very hardy, from Manitoba, slow steady growth

=== Use by Native Americans ===
The Mohegan use the inner bark as a cough remedy, and the sap as a sweetening agent, and to make maple syrup following the introduction of metal cookware by Europeans.

== Big trees ==
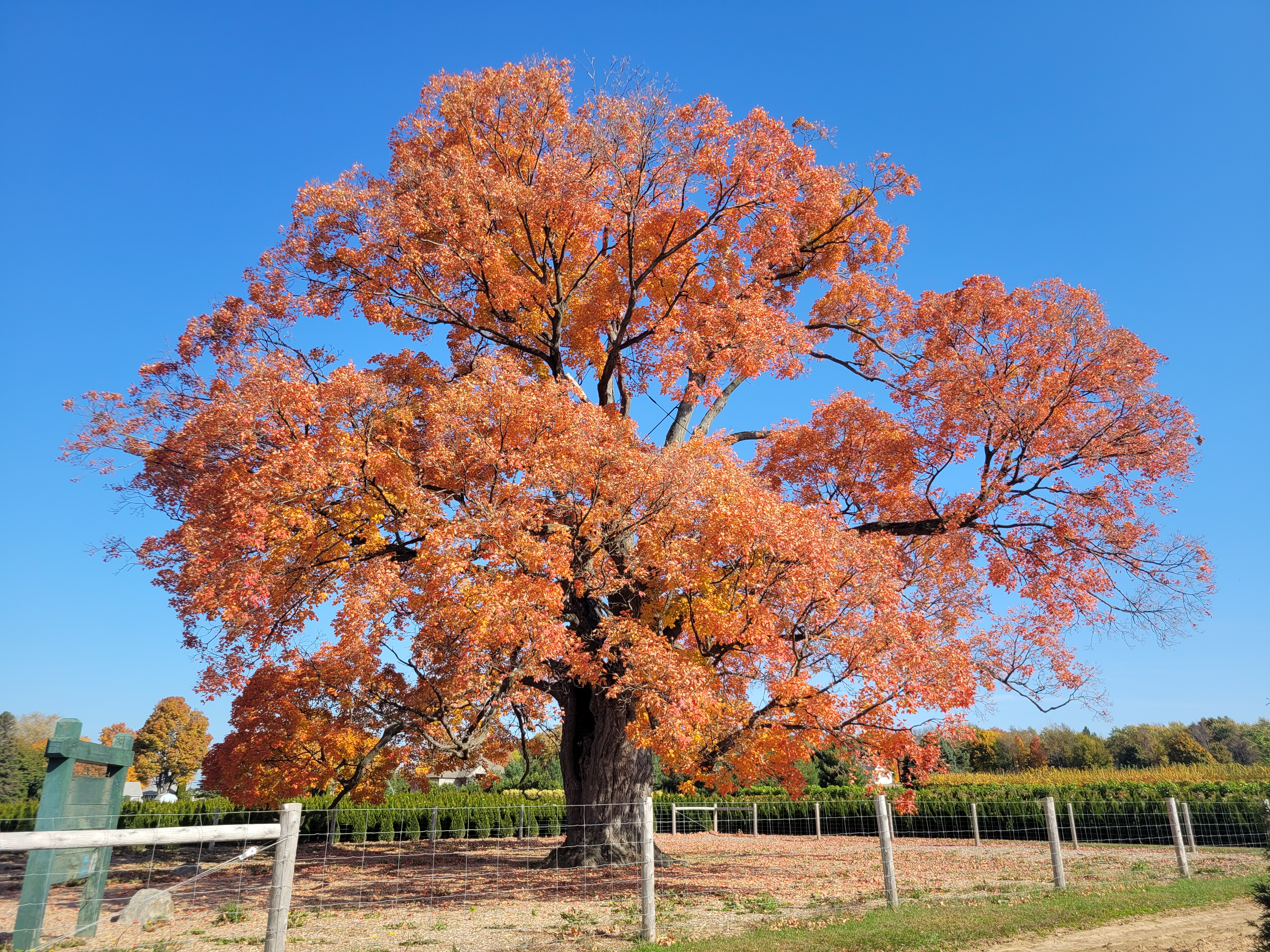
Comfort Maple in Pelham, Ontario

The United States national champion for Acer saccharum is located in Charlemont, Massachusetts. In 2007, the year it was submitted, it had a circumference of 5.92 metres (233 in; 19 ft 5 in) at 1.3 metres (4 ft 3 in) above the ground's surface, and thus a diameter at breast height of about 1.88 metres (6 ft 2 in). At that time the tree was 34.1 metres (111 ft 11 in) tall with an average crown spread of 27.7 metres (90 ft 11 in). Using the scoring system of circumference in inches plus height in feet plus 25% of crown spread in feet resulted in a total number of 368 points at the National Register of Big Trees. A tree in Lyme, Connecticut, measured in 2012, had a circumference of 18 ft 3 in; 6 m, or an average diameter at breast height of about 5.8 feet (5 ft 10 in; 1.8 m). This tree had been 123 feet (37 m) tall with a crown spread of 86 feet (26 m), counting for a total number of 364 points.

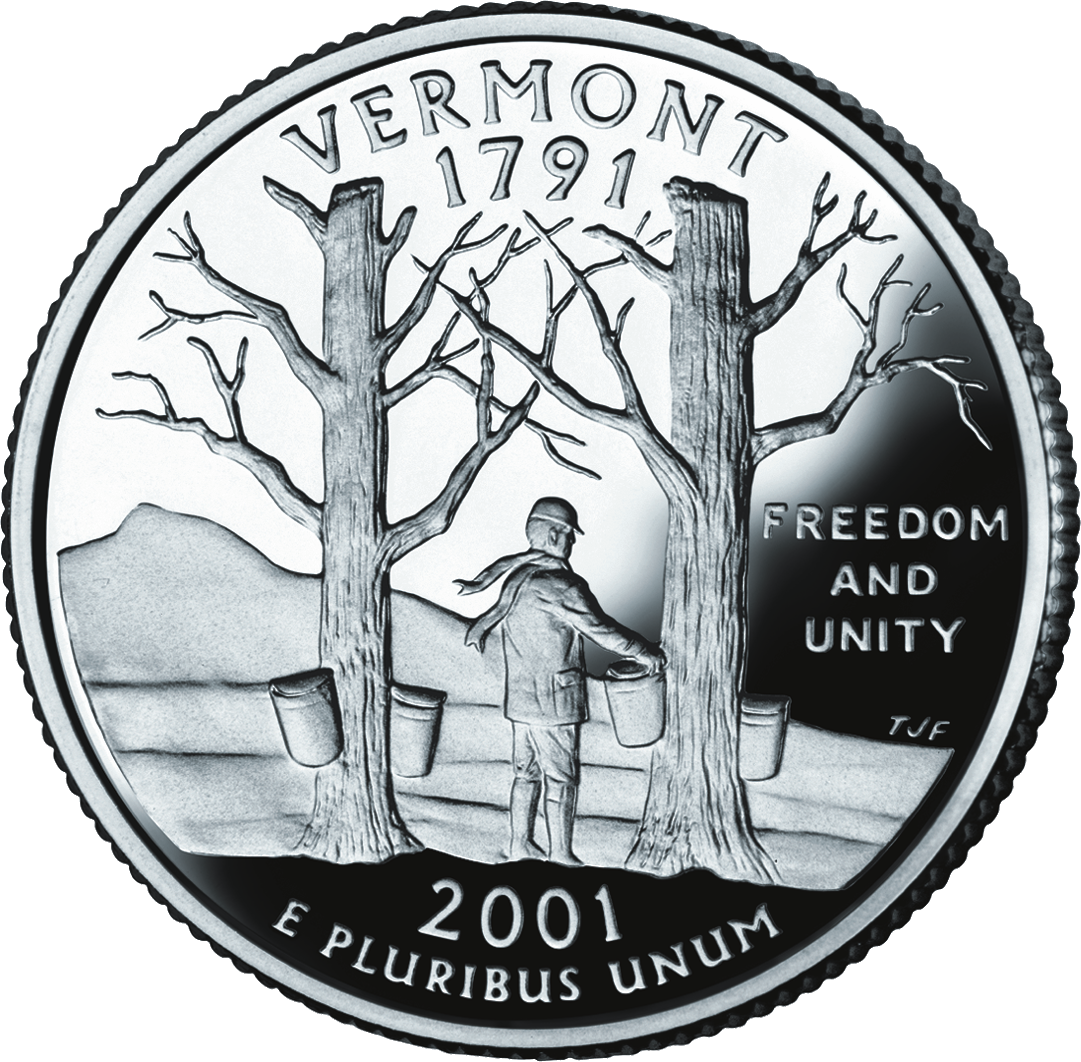
Vermont state quarter

== In culture ==
A solid red stylized 11-pointed sugar maple leaf appears in outline on the flag of Canada.

The sugar maple is the state tree of the US states of New York, Vermont, West Virginia, and Wisconsin.

It is depicted on the state quarter of Vermont, issued in 2001.
