= Coleraine (disambiguation) =

Coleraine is a large town in Northern Ireland.

Coleraine may also refer to:

== Northern Ireland ==
- Coleraine Academical Institution, a grammar school for boys
- Coleraine Borough Council
- Coleraine F.C., a football club
- Coleraine barony
- Coleraine (UK Parliament constituency), a former political district
- The former County Coleraine, later abolished and replaced with County Londonderry
- Coleraine Cheddar, a brand name of Dairy Produce Packers Ltd, and part of Kerry Group

== Elsewhere ==
- Coleraine, Victoria, Australia
- Coleraine, Ontario, Canada - a community in Vaughan, Ontario
- Saint-Joseph-de-Coleraine, Quebec, Canada - a municipality in southern Quebec
- Coleraine, Minnesota, United States
- Coleraine, Georgia (variously spelled "Colerain") -- extinct town in the U.S.state of Georgia.

== See also ==
- Colerain (disambiguation)
- Colrain (disambiguation)
