= Celeste M. A. Winslow =

American poet

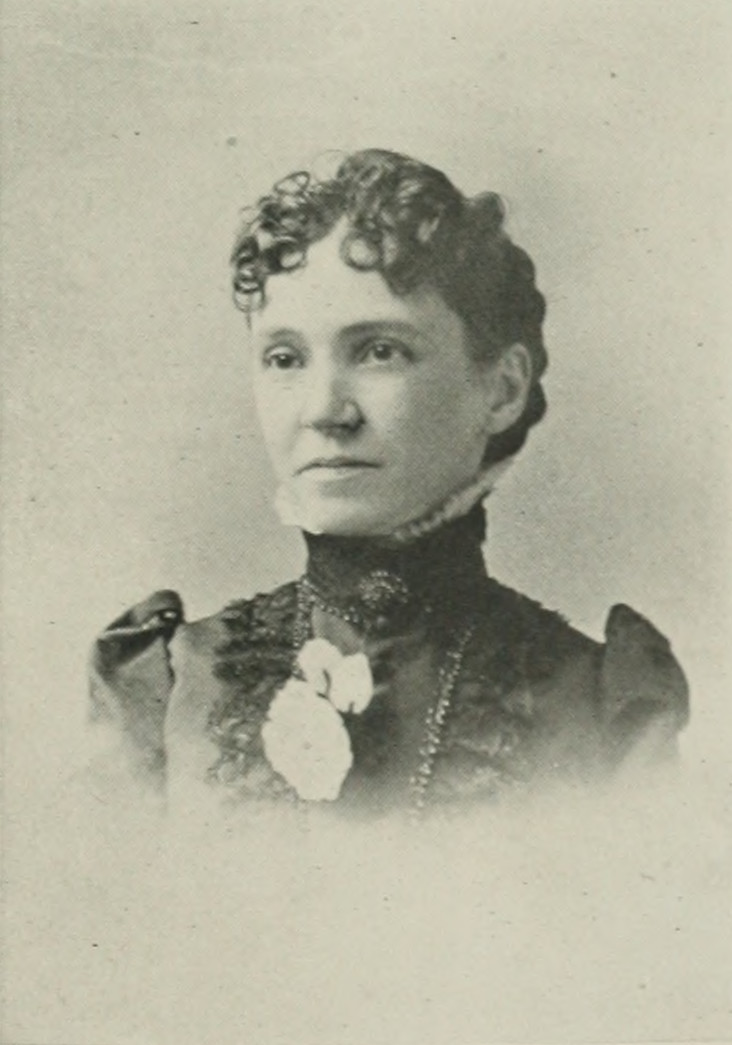
- Photo in A Woman of the Century
- Born: Celeste Mary Augusta Hall; November 22, 1837; Charlemont, Massachusetts, U.S.
- Died: June 17, 1908 (aged 70); New Rochelle, New York, U.S.
- Education: Keokuk Female Seminary, Keokuk, Iowa, U.S.
- Occupation: author
- Spouse: Charles Henry Winslow (m. 1860; died 1904)
- Relatives: Thomas Minor; Grace Greenwood
- Writing career
- Language: English

Celeste M. A. Winslow (née, Hall; November 22, 1837 – June 17, 1908) was an American author of the long nineteenth century. She was well known as a poet and contributor to the periodical literature of the day, as well as a political contributor to leading magazines and newspapers. Her work appeared in the Western Reserve Chronicle, The St. Joseph Herald, Ironton County Register, The Saint Paul Globe, Appleton Post, The Sumner County Press, Bolivar Bulletin, Chicago Tribune, and Independent-Observer.

== Early life and education ==
Celeste Mary Augusta Hall was born in Charlemont, Massachusetts, November 22, 1837. She was the daughter of Joel Augustus Hall, and his wife, and Mary Richards (Miner). Her father, Joel, was a distant relative of the Rear-Admiral Andrew H. Foote. Her mother, Mary -a descendant of the families of Lyons, Richards, Holman, Belcher, Treat, and Chetwood- was known as the author of much poetry and prose, especially of popular temperance tales. Her great-grandfather, Richardson Miner, a soldier of the Continental Army, was descended from Thomas Minor, who moved to Connecticut, in 1642. from Somerset county, England. The family name originated with Sir Henry Miner, who was knighted by an early king for bravery. The family's poetic taste was largely derived from the Lyons ancestors.

When she was eight, the family removed to Keosauqua, Iowa, and later for a pioneer home on a prairie. There, she studied and wrote stories and rhymes. Her first printed story appeared in a southern journal, when she was twelve years old. Shortly afterwards, the Hall family removed to Keokuk, Iowa, where her education was completed in the Keokuk Female Seminary, conducted by Rev. W. H. Williams and wife.

== Career ==
On October 25, 1860, in Keokuk, she married Charles Henry Winslow, M. D., (1831–1904). Their two sons, Herbert Hall Winslow and Arthur Severance Winslow, were born there. Removing to Chicago, Illinois, in 1884, Winslow assisted her son in the editorial work of his periodical Happy Hours, afterwards Winslow's Monthly. She published both poetry and prose enough for volumes, but devotion to her family interfered with systematic work in literary fields. Her writings appeared in the Atlantic Monthly, Scribner's Magazine, Lippincott's Magazine, Independent, Advance, Manhattan Magazine, Brooklyn Magazine, and Good Company. She also contributed to numerous newspapers in various parts of the United States.

== Personal life ==
In 1893, she was living in New York City, where her son, Herbert, was a successful playwright. His mother-in-law was Grace Greenwood.

Winslow died at New Rochelle, New York on June 17, 1908, after a long illness. She was survived by her sons.

== Selected works ==
=== Poems ===
- "Sewing", (1868, in Western Reserve Chronicle, Warren, Ohio)
- "The Unattained", (1892, in The St. Joseph Herald, St. Joseph, Missouri)
- "Border-Lands", (1880, in Ironton County Register, Ironton, Missouri)
- "Blue Jay", (1883, in The Saint Paul Globe , Saint Paul, Minnesota)
- "Her George", (1870, in Appleton Post, Appleton, Wisconsin)
- "The Teacher's Task", (1880, in The Sumner County Press, Wellington, Kansas)
- "Perplexed", (1876, in Bolivar Bulletin, Bolivar, Tennessee)
- "Christmas-Day", (1885, in Chicago Tribune, Chicago, Illinois)

=== Short stories ===
- "His First Check", (1907, in Independent-Observer, Conrad, Montana)
