= Maple decline =

Maple decline is a term describing loss of vigor and dieback in forests or urban plantings of maple trees. It is not a disease or a syndrome, nor is it contagious or endemic. Instead, it is a generalized set of symptoms that may be applied to any species of tree suffering a wide range of different stressors.

Norway maple, red maple and sugar maple are the species most commonly affected. The trouble often starts after insect-induced defoliation, which weakens the trees and makes them more susceptible to secondary pathogens. Early signs of decline include small or scorched foliage, and premature fall colors on some of a tree's branches. Later, dead twigs may become visible as signs of distress become evident throughout the crown. As the tree's condition deteriorates, whole branches die. The tree may attempt to compensate for its diminishing crown by producing leafy shoots on its trunk. The defoliation may occur early enough that the tree may produce new leaves in summer that do not harden off before the first frost. Fruiting bodies of bracket fungi may appear on the trunk or in the crown. Eventually, the whole tree dies. The process from first signs of trouble to total death may span anywhere from a few years to several decades.

In urban areas decline is aggravated by soil compaction or disturbance, soil pollution (caused by discarded cigarettes, pet droppings, careless or malicious use of herbicides, and road salt), air pollution and unfavorable moisture conditions. In rural areas, maple decline is often attributed to soil acidification caused by acid rain. Soils which have developed from nutrient-poor parent materials such as sandstone, quartzite and granite are most sensitive to acidification. Fertile areas often show maple decline where large numbers of livestock such as cattle are allowed to roam in woodlots, as herds or flocks of livestock can compact a soil to a degree which is unfavorable to many of the trees. Carelessness with machinery or taps in sugar bushes is a frequent cause of decline in sugar maple and black maple.

Unusual weather conditions can also lead to maple decline. A classic example occurred across southern Quebec in 1981 when an exceptional February thaw destroyed the snow cover. Later, hard frost penetrated the unprotected ground. The soil was still frozen when the growing season began. Widespread dieback was seen over the remainder of the decade. Subsequent experimentation has verified that trees in Quebec are more likely to show stunted growth and dieback where snow cover is prevented from developing over a winter.
