= Mount Institute =

Peak in Hawley, Massachusetts, U.S.

Highest point
- Elevation: 1,536 ft (468 m)
- Coordinates: 42°36′49.02″N 72°52′11.73″W

Geography
- Location: Franklin County, Massachusetts

Climbing
- Easiest route: Chairlift

Mount Institute, 1,536 ft (468 m), is a peak located in Franklin County, Massachusetts, just south of the village of Charlemont.

== History ==
Mount Institute was named by Horace Mann when he had an educational institute in Charlemont that overlooked the mountain.

In 1953, Arthur Parker started a small ski area called Thunder Mountain on the northwestern slope. The rope tow served ski area would by closed by 1954.

Parker reopened a greatly expanded Thunder Mountain Ski Area in 1961, served by a double chairlift.

== Recreation ==
Thunder Mountain Ski Area was renamed Berkshire East Ski Resort at the end of the 1960s. Berkshire East provides skiing, snowboarding, and snow tubing on Mount Institute in the winter months.
