= Pocumtuck Mountain =

Mountain in Massachusetts, United States

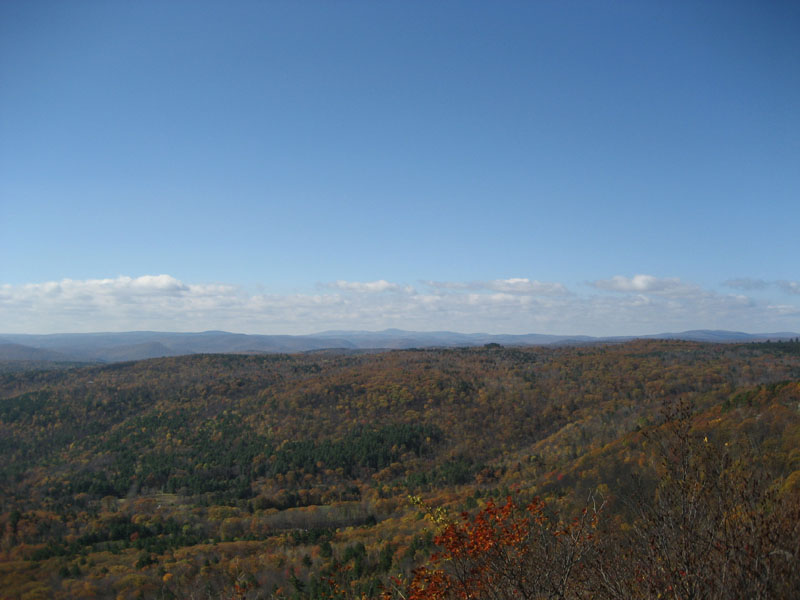
- The western view from the summit ledge

Highest point
- Elevation: 1,872 ft (571 m)
- Coordinates: 42°39′07″N 72°46′27″W

Geography
- Location within Massachusetts
- Location: Charlemont, Massachusetts, U.S.
- Topo map: USGS Heath

Should not be confused with the Pocumtuck Range (Pocumtuck Ridge) of Deerfield and Greenfield, Massachusetts

Pocumtuck Mountain is a mountain peak in Charlemont, Massachusetts, located west of the abandoned Catamount settlement. Its summit ledge features wide views of western Franklin County and northern Berkshire County. Pocumtuck Mountain is often confused with the nearby Pocumtuck Range in Deerfield, Massachusetts.

The mountain was named after the Pocumtuc Indians on October 16, 1855 during one of Catamount's Old Homes Days Festival. Such festivals were held often on the scenic mountain – including one visited by Massachusetts Governor John Davis Long.

Except for areas belonging to Catamount State forest, the ledges and surrounding land are privately owned. Trespassing for any reason is not permitted.
