= Catamount, Massachusetts =

Village in Massachusetts, United States

Coordinates: 42.653°N 72.756°W

The schoolhouse monument

Catamount is a former village of Colrain, Massachusetts. In 1812, the schoolhouse that once stood in Catamount was the first schoolhouse to fly the United States Flag.

From the mid 18th century until the late 19th century, Catamount was mainly a farming community. Nearby Pocumtuck Mountain was often a popular destination for people around the state. In 1880, the Old Home Days festival on Pocumtuck Mountain was visited by Massachusetts Governor John Davis Long.

Due in part to the remote, mountainous location, Catamount was abandoned in the early 20th century. Much of the land was acquired by the Commonwealth of Massachusetts in 1967, leading to the creation of the Catamount State Forest.

Catamount is currently accessible to hikers and snowmobilers. McLeod Pond is a popular destination for local fishers and canoers. Catamount State Forest is managed by the Mohawk Trail State Forest.
