= Colrain, Massachusetts =

- Town
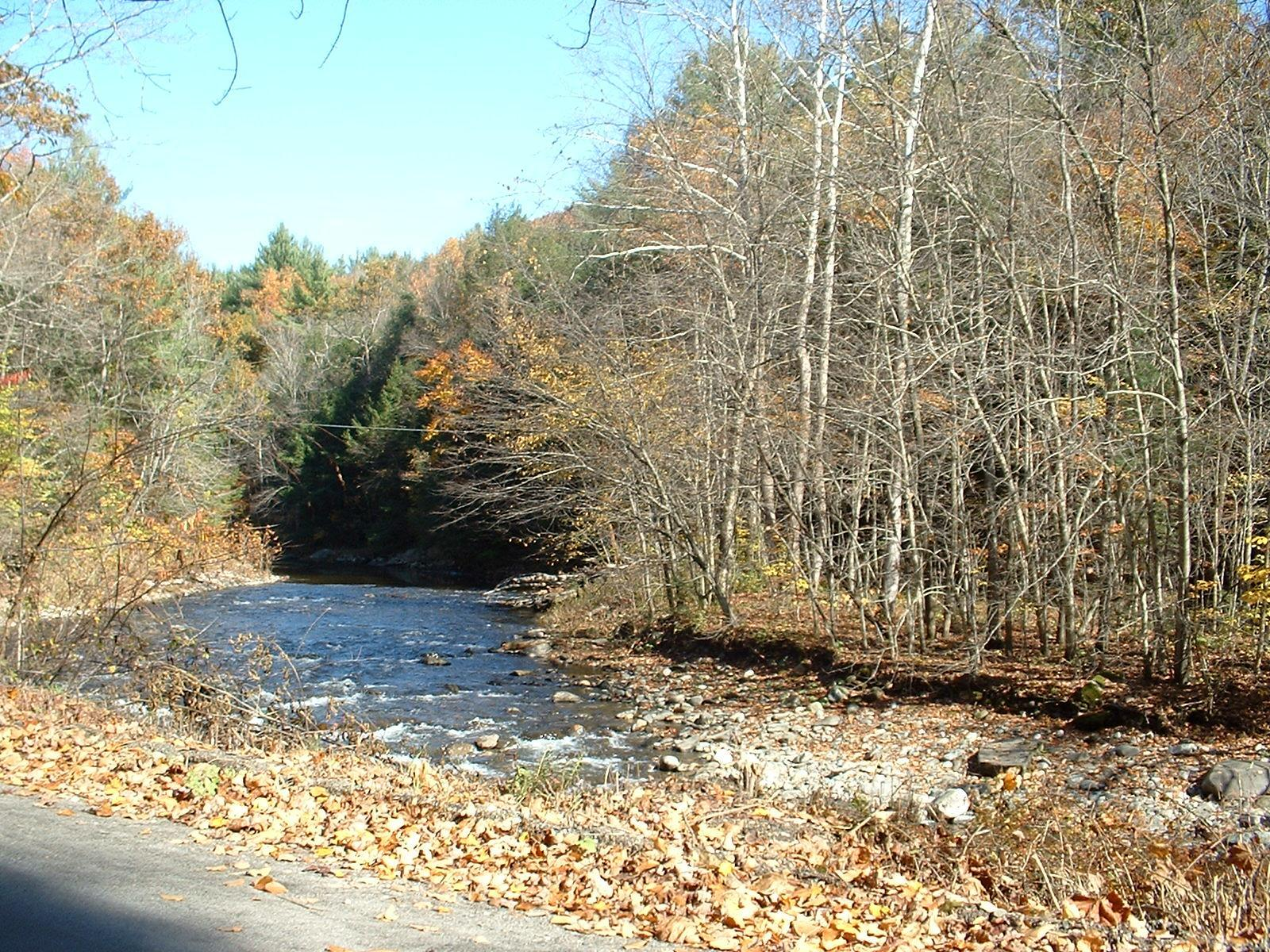
- The Green River, flowing along the Colrain border

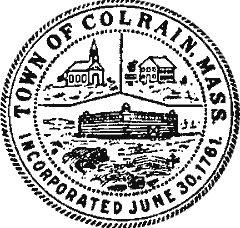
- Seal

- Location in Franklin County in Massachusetts
- Coordinates: 42°40′23″N 72°41′50″W
- Country: United States
- State: Massachusetts
- County: Franklin
- Settled: 1735
- Incorporated: 1761

Government
  - Type: Open town meeting

Area
  - Total: 43.4 sq mi (112.4 km^{2})
  - Land: 43.1 sq mi (111.7 km^{2})
  - Water: 0.27 sq mi (0.7 km^{2})
- Elevation: 902 ft (275 m)

Population (2020)
  - Total: 1,606
  - Density: 37.24/sq mi (14.38/km^{2})
- Time zone: UTC-5 (Eastern)
  - Summer (DST): UTC-4 (Eastern)
- ZIP Code: 01340
- Area code: 413
- FIPS code: 25-14885
- GNIS feature ID: 0618160
- Website: www.colrain-ma.gov

Colrain is a town in Franklin County, Massachusetts, United States. The population was 1,606 at the 2020 census. It is part of the Springfield metropolitan area, Massachusetts.

== History ==
Colrain was first settled in 1735 as "Boston Township No. 2", organized into an independently governing town body in 1745, and was officially incorporated on June 30, 1761.

Although originally named Colrain in 1745, and officially incorporated under that name in 1761, the town spelled its name (and appeared on maps) as "Colraine" for over 112 years until in 1873 the Commonwealth of Massachusetts insisted that the town begin to spell its name as it was officially incorporated.

Colrain has nine historic village areas: Elm Grove, Lyonsville, Foundry Village, Shattuckville, Griswoldville, Colrain City, Catamount Hill, Stewartville, and Gimletville. Much of the town's land area lies outside of these villages.

Colrain City (which constitutes the town center), was originally named as a joke during the mid 19th-century, since the small village was clearly anything but a city. Located in the valley at the base of Chandler Hill, a contemporary satirical poem suggested that the inexplicable grouping of houses was populated by people who had failed to climb the road leading over the hill. The center has remained almost completely unchanged over the last 150 years, and was declared a historic district in 2006.

In May 1812, Colrain was the first town in the United States to fly the U.S. flag over a public schoolhouse. The schoolhouse was located in the hill-top village of Catamount.

Many of the original settlers were immigrants from Ireland and Scotland, and it is said that the town was named in honor of Lord Coleraine, an Irish peer. According to local tradition, Lord Coleraine was so well pleased by this that he sent a fine bell to the townspeople for their new meeting house. Unfortunately, the bell never arrived. Apparently, so the story goes, it was sold by the unscrupulous agent to whom it was entrusted, and was installed in a church in Boston. An alternative claim is that when in transit, the crew of the ship encountered a problem and the ship went down with the bell and was never to be found again.

During the period of King George's War, Colrain was an active military front. Colrain was home to four forts at this time: Fort Morrison (also called "North Fort"), Fort Morris (also called "South Fort"), Fort Lucas (built near the town meeting house on Chandler Hill), and Rev. McDowell's Fort (a private fort built by Rev. Alexander McDowell which included his home). All of these were palisaded garrison houses, and were used as protection against frequent Indian attacks. Forts Lucas and Morrison were garrisoned during the war by the Massachusetts colonial militia, and there is also some evidence that British royal troops used Fort Morrison briefly. After King George's War, colonial troops were withdrawn and the forts were used for local defense until the outbreak of the Seven Years' War in 1754, when the forts were renovated and garrisons of colonial militia were once again installed at Forts Lucas and Morrison, where they would remain for the duration of the nine-year war. This was a source of considerable irritation for the townspeople, who were obligated to house the garrison troops in their homes. At the close of the Seven Years' War in 1763, colonial militia troops were permanently withdrawn, and the era of Colrain's military significance drew to a close. With the end of the French and Indian Wars the danger of Indian attacks was greatly lessened, and the forts were abandoned by the end of the 1760s.

== Geography ==
According to the United States Census Bureau, the town has a total area of 43.4 square miles (112.4 km^{2}), of which 43.1 square miles (111.7 km^{2}) is land and 0.27 square miles (0.7 km^{2}), or 0.59%, is water. The town ranks second in area of the county's 26 towns, and twenty-fifth of the 351 cities and towns in Massachusetts. Until the expansion of New Salem after the building of the Quabbin Reservoir in the 1930s, Colrain was the largest town in the county. It is located on the northern border of the county and state, with Windham County, Vermont. The town is bordered by Halifax and Guilford, Vermont, to the north, Leyden to the east, Greenfield to the southeast, Shelburne to the south, Charlemont to the southwest, and Heath to the west. Colrain's town center is located 9 miles (14 km) northwest of Greenfield, 45 miles (72 km) north of Springfield, and approximately 100 miles (160 km) west-northwest of Boston.

Colrain is located in the northeastern part of the Berkshires, with the many hills divided by the rivers which run through town. With the exception of a 0.65-mile (1.05 km) stretch, near the Vermont border, the entirety of the eastern border lies along the Green River, which flows through neighboring Greenfield into the Deerfield River. The east and west branches of the North River also meet in the town and flow into the Deerfield River, just south of the town along the Shelburne-Buckland town line. The town is also home to two state forests, Catamount State Forest to the southwest, and half of the H.O. Cook State Forest to the northwest.

The main road through Colrain is Massachusetts Route 112, whose northern terminus is in town at the Vermont state line. It is a common route for ski traffic headed to Mount Snow, Vermont. The road closely follows the East Branch of the North River south to its junction with the West Branch, before following the main branch southward towards Massachusetts Route 2 in Shelburne. The nearest interstate, Interstate 91, is accessible in Greenfield. There is no rail, bus or air service in town, with the nearest bus and Amtrak service in Greenfield, and the nearest air service in Turners Falls. The nearest national air service can be found at Bradley International Airport in Windsor Locks, Connecticut.

== Climate ==
In a typical year, Colrain, Massachusetts temperatures fall below 50 °F (10 °C) for 205 days per year. Annual precipitation is typically 49 inches per year and snow covers the ground 80 days per year or 21.9% of the year. It may be helpful to understand the yearly precipitation by imagining 10 straight days of moderate rain per year. The humidity is below 60% for approximately 18.4 days or 5% of the year.

== Demographics ==
Historical population
Year	Pop.	±%
1790	1,417	—
1840	1,726	+21.8%
1850	1,785	+3.4%
1860	1,798	+0.7%
1870	1,742	−3.1%
1880	1,777	+2.0%
1890	1,671	−6.0%
1900	1,749	+4.7%
1910	1,741	−0.5%
1920	1,607	−7.7%
1930	1,391	−13.4%
1940	1,497	+7.6%
1950	1,546	+3.3%
1960	1,426	−7.8%
1970	1,420	−0.4%
1980	1,552	+9.3%
1990	1,757	+13.2%
2000	1,813	+3.2%
2010	1,671	−7.8%
2020	1,606	−3.9%
2023	1,629	+1.4%
Source: United States census records and Population Estimates Program data.

As of the census of 2000, there were 1,813 people, 686 households, and 478 families residing in the town. By population, Colrain ranks tenth in Franklin County, and 293rd in Massachusetts. The population density was 41.8 inhabitants per square mile (16.1/km^{2}), which ranks nineteenth in the county and 318th in the Commonwealth. There were 776 housing units at an average density of 17.9 per square mile (6.9/km^{2}). The racial makeup of the town was 98.65% White, 0.33% Asian, 0.00% Black 0.11% from other races, and 0.88% from two or more races. Hispanic or Latino of any race were 0.99% of the population.

There were 686 households, out of which 33.7% had children under the age of 18 living with them, 55.2% were married couples living together, 9.5% had a female householder with no husband present, and 30.3% were non-families. Of all households, 23.8% were made up of individuals, and 9.6% had someone living alone who was 65 years of age or older. The average household size was 2.64 and the average family size was 3.12.

In the town, the population was spread out, with 27.7% under the age of 18, 5.7% from 18 to 24, 30.8% from 25 to 44, 23.5% from 45 to 64, and 12.2% who were 65 years of age or older. The median age was 38 years. For every 100 females, there were 103.3 males. For every 100 females age 18 and over, there were 102.2 males.

The median income for a household in the town was $40,076, and the median income for a family was $46,518. Males had a median income of $32,800 versus $24,125 for females. The per capita income for the town was $18,948. About 4.6% of families and 6.8% of the population were below the poverty line, including 8.4% of those under age 18 and 3.2% of those age 65 or over.

== Government ==
Colrain employs the open town meeting form of government, and is led by a board of selectmen. The town has its own police and fire departments, as well as emergency services. The town's library, Griswold Memorial Library, is connected to the regional library network. The town also has its own post office as well. The nearest hospital, Franklin Medical Center, is in Greenfield.

On the state level, Colrain is represented in the Massachusetts House of Representatives as part of the First Franklin district, though the seat will be vacant until January 2027 after the resignation of Natalie Blais (D-Deerfield) on January 19, 2026. In the Massachusetts Senate, the town is part of the Berkshire, Franklin, Hampshire and Hampden district, represented by Paul W. Mark (D-Becket). Colrain is represented on the Massachusetts Governor's Council by District 8 Councillor Tara Jacobs (D-North Adams). The town is patrolled by the Second (Shelburne Falls) Station of Troop "B" of the Massachusetts State Police.

On the national level, Colrain is represented in the United States House of Representatives as part of Massachusetts's 2nd congressional district, and is represented by Jim McGovern of Worcester. Massachusetts is represented in the United States Senate by Elizabeth Warren and Edward Markey.

== Education ==
Colrain is a member of the Mohawk Trail Regional School District, which covers six towns on the elementary level and most of western Franklin County on the upper levels of education. Colrain Central School serves students from pre-kindergarten through sixth grades, and students from grades 7–12 attend Mohawk Trail Regional High School in Buckland. There is a private school, the Academy at Charlemont, in neighboring Charlemont, and several other private and religious schools are located in the region.

The nearest community college, Greenfield Community College, is located in Greenfield. The nearest state college is Massachusetts College of Liberal Arts in North Adams, and the nearest state university is the University of Massachusetts Amherst. The nearest private college was Marlboro College in Marlboro, VT until 2020, with several others located southeast in the Northampton area.

== Notable people ==
- William Apess, Pequot writer, preacher, and activist
- Danford Balch, first man legally hanged in Oregon
- Joseph Denison, first president of Kansas State University, abolitionist minister
- Almira Edson, watercolorist
- Lorenzo Lyons, missionary to the Kingdom of Hawaii
- Samuel R. McClellan, Wisconsin state senator
- Elizabeth Perkins, actress
- Samuel Taggart, Congregational minister and US congressman
