= Charlemont, Massachusetts =

- Town
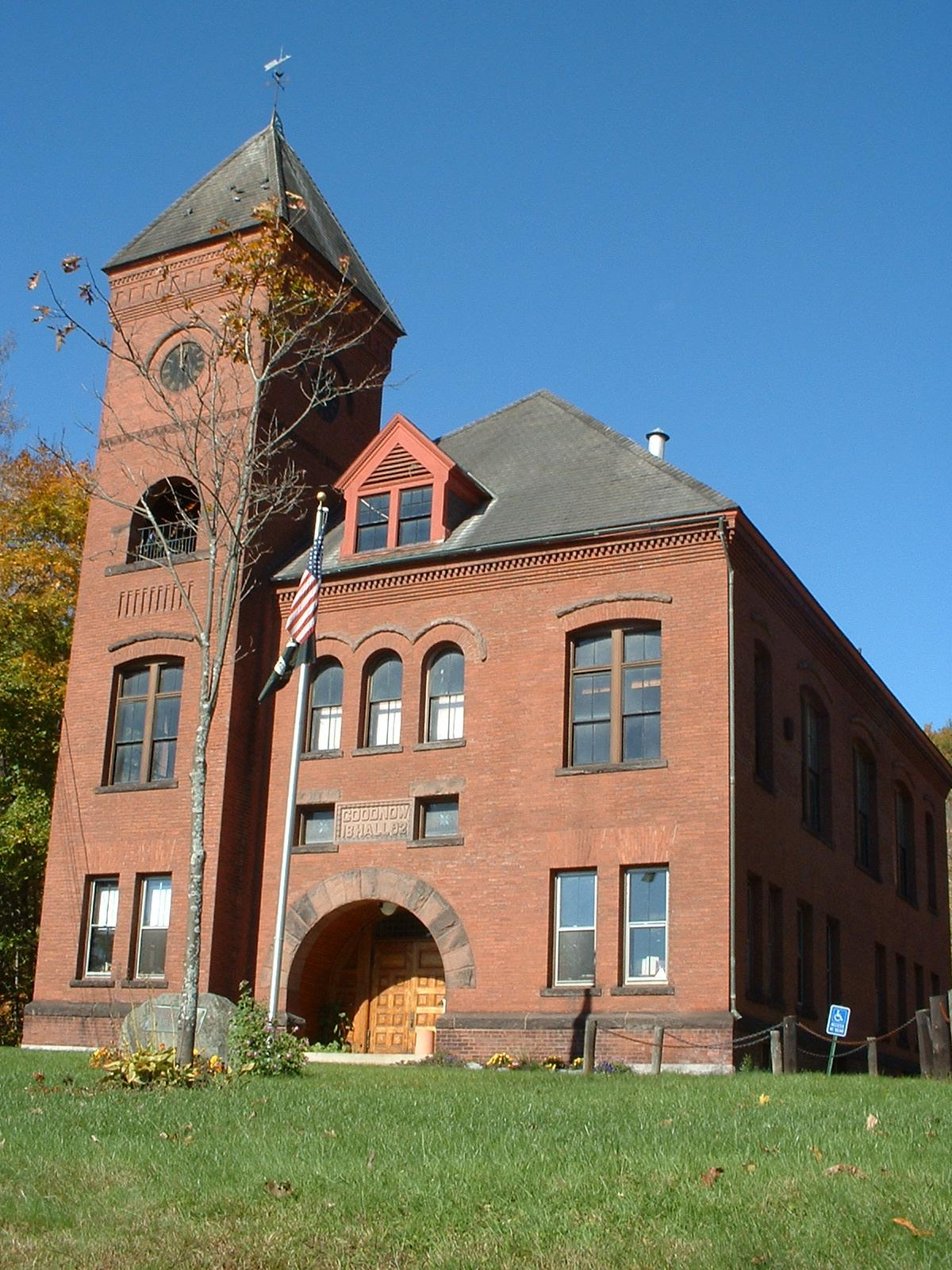
- Goodnow Hall, home of the town offices

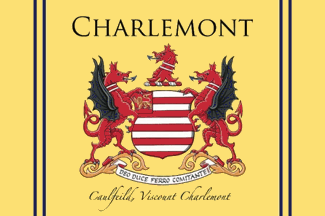
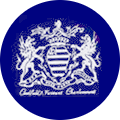
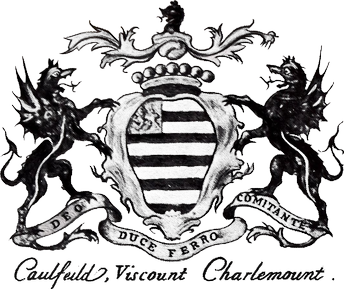
- Flag Seal Coat of arms
- Motto: Deo duce, ferro comitante (Latin) "God being my guide, my sword, my companion."
- Location in Franklin County in Massachusetts
- Coordinates: 42°37′40″N 72°52′13″W
- Country: United States
- State: Massachusetts
- County: Franklin
- Settled: 1742
- Incorporated: 1765

Government
  - Type: Open town meeting

Area
  - Total: 26.4 sq mi (68.3 km^{2})
  - Land: 25.9 sq mi (67.2 km^{2})
  - Water: 0.42 sq mi (1.1 km^{2})
- Elevation: 965 ft (294 m)

Population (2020)
  - Total: 1,185
  - Density: 45.7/sq mi (17.6/km^{2})
- Time zone: UTC-5 (Eastern)
  - Summer (DST): UTC-4 (Eastern)
- ZIP Codes: 01339 (Charlemont); 01367 (Rowe); 01370 (Shelburne Falls)
- Area code: 413
- FIPS code: 25-12505
- GNIS feature ID: 0619379
- Website: www.charlemont-ma.us

Charlemont is a town in Franklin County, Massachusetts, United States. The population was 1,185 at the 2020 census. It is part of the Springfield, Massachusetts Metropolitan Statistical Area.

== History ==
Charlemont was first colonized by Moses Rice (1694–1755) who purchased 2,200 acres (8.9 km^{2}) on April 23, 1743, that been previously set off as Boston Township Number 1 in 1735 by the Great and General Court. The town was along the distant frontier at the time, and was the subject of several raids by Native Americans. While plowing in the fields one day, Rice was shot and wounded by Indians lying in ambush. They also shot and killed another man, Phineas Arms, at the same time and captured Moses' eight-year-old grandson Asa, who had been riding the plow horse. Moses was taken to the adjoining woods, scalped, and left for dead, but Asa was carried off to Canada. The town was incorporated as Charlemont in 1765, most likely named for the town in County Armagh, Ulster, Ireland. The town was mostly rural, with farming being the main industry until the advent of the railroad, which traveled through town towards the Hoosac Tunnel. Today the town industry also includes tourism, with a ski area and other tourist areas along the Mohawk Trail.

In the years preceding the Revolutionary War, as Charlemont's citizens grew increasingly dissatisfied with British rule, Rev. Jonathan Leavitt was installed as the minister of Charlemont's Congregational Church. Born in Walpole, New Hampshire, and graduate of Yale College, Rev. Leavitt arrived in Charlemont in 1767, but his Loyalist sympathies grated on his congregation.

By 1777 the situation came to a stand-off: Leavitt refused to accept his salary in rapidly depreciating colonial currency. So the town voted to simply close the church, and it stationed a constable at the door to bar the offending reverend. But Leavitt would not be deterred: He moved his sermons to the schoolhouse, where he held forth until 1785, when he was finally dismissed. He sued for his salary, as well as his loss on the depreciated colonial currency, and was awarded £700.

Leavitt's descendants continued to remain in Charlemont and the surrounding region, and several—including Col. Roger Hooker Leavitt, who represented Charlemont in the Massachusetts House of Representatives, and his brother Hart Leavitt—became notable operators of stations on the Underground Railroad, sheltering many escaped slaves on their journeys northward.

Revolutionary War soldier and historian Lemuel Roberts helped his father establish a farm in Charlemont before leaving to fight in the Siege of Boston.

== Geography ==
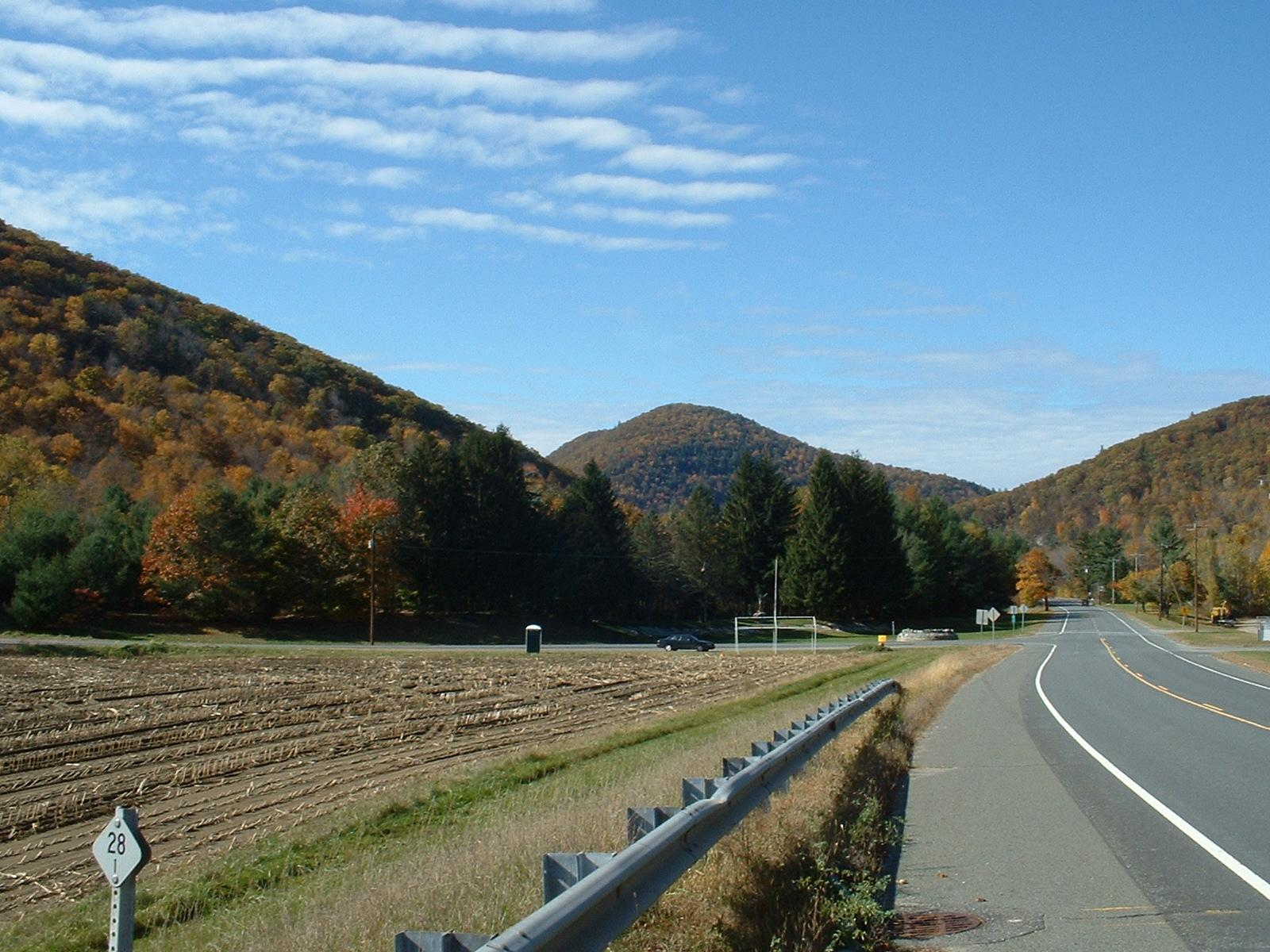
The Mohawk Trail, with Todd Mountain in the background

According to the United States Census Bureau, the town has a total area of 26.4 square miles (68.3 km^{2}), of which 25.9 square miles (67.2 km^{2}) is land and 0.42 square miles (1.1 km^{2}), or 1.55%, is water. Charlemont is located in the western part of the county, with a small portion making up the western county line with Berkshire County. The town is bordered by Rowe to the northwest, Heath to the northeast, Colrain and Shelburne to the east, Buckland to the southeast, Hawley to the southwest, and Savoy and Florida to the west. Charlemont is 18 miles (29 km) west of Greenfield, 45 miles (72 km) north-northwest of Springfield, and 106 miles (171 km) west-northwest of Boston.

Charlemont's eastern border is marked by the junction of the North River and the Deerfield River, the latter flowing eastward through town. The majority of town lands lie north of the river, except for a strip along the entire Hawley town border. The town is surrounded by the eastern Berkshires, with the western part of town being dominated by Todd Mountain and the Mohawk Trail State Forest. Several other lower peaks dot the land north and town of the river, including Bald Mountain and Westfield Mountain north of the center of town, and, just over the Hawley town line, Mount Peak and Mount Institute. There are also several brooks through town, with Mill Brook lying near the town center (the site of a covered bridge).

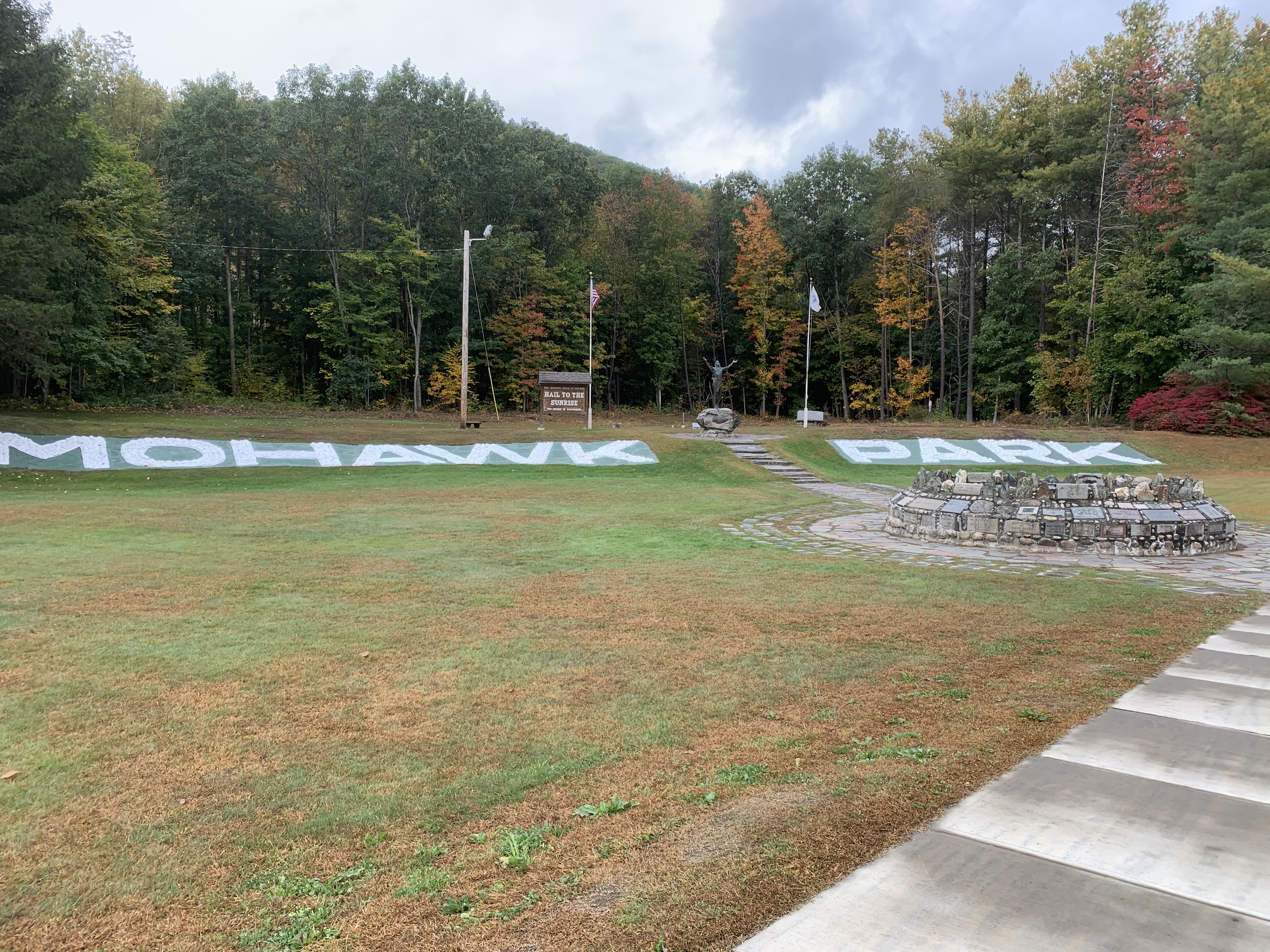
Mohawk Park

Much of the length of the Deerfield in town is followed by the Mohawk Trail, also known as Massachusetts Route 2. Near the center of town, the road also junctions with, and shares a short, 0.6-mile (0.97 km) concurrency with Route 8A. Along the southern bank of the river, a stretch of the Guilford Rail System leads freight trains from Greenfield towards the Hoosac Tunnel in neighboring Florida, towards New York. The nearest interstate, Interstate 91, is several miles to the east along Route 2. The town lies at the westernmost point of the Charlemont-Greenfield line (Route 41) of the Franklin Regional Transit Authority (FRTA), with a scheduled stop at the Federated Church. The nearest regional bus and air service is in Greenfield and North Adams, the nearest Amtrak rail service is in Greenfield, and the nearest national air service is at Albany International Airport in New York.

== Demographics ==
Historical population
Year	Pop.	±%
1790	665	—
1840	1,181	+77.6%
1850	1,173	−0.7%
1860	1,075	−8.4%
1870	1,005	−6.5%
1880	932	−7.3%
1890	972	+4.3%
1900	1,094	+12.6%
1910	1,001	−8.5%
1920	808	−19.3%
1930	816	+1.0%
1940	789	−3.3%
1950	855	+8.4%
1960	897	+4.9%
1970	897	+0.0%
1980	1,149	+28.1%
1990	1,249	+8.7%
2000	1,358	+8.7%
2010	1,266	−6.8%
2020	1,185	−6.4%
2022*	1,181	−0.3%
* = population estimate. Source: United States census records and Population Estimates Program data.

As of the census of 2000, there were 1,358 people, 524 households, and 353 families residing in the town. By population, Charlemont ranks eighteenth of the 25 towns in Franklin county, and 314th out of the 351 cities and towns in Massachusetts. The population density was 52.0 inhabitants per square mile (20.1/km^{2}), which ranks fifteenth in the county and 310th in the commonwealth. There were 628 housing units at an average density of 24.1 per square mile (9.3/km^{2}). The racial makeup of the town was 95.07% White, 0.29% African American, 0.66% Native American, 0.74% Asian, 0.07% Pacific Islander, 0.44% from other races, and 2.72% from two or more races. Hispanic or Latino of any race were 1.99% of the population.

There were 524 households, out of which 30.7% had children under the age of 18 living with them, 50.8% were married couples living together, 12.2% had a female householder with no husband present, and 32.6% were non-families. 25.2% of all households were made up of individuals, and 8.0% had someone living alone who was 65 years of age or older. The average household size was 2.52 and the average family size was 2.99.

In the town, the population was spread out, with 25.1% under the age of 18, 8.0% from 18 to 24, 29.1% from 25 to 44, 26.3% from 45 to 64, and 11.6% who were 65 years of age or older. The median age was 38 years. For every 100 females, there were 96.8 males. For every 100 females age 18 and over, there were 94.1 males.

The median income for a household in the town was $46,548, and the median income for a family was $50,962. Males had a median income of $37,500 versus $26,667 for females. The per capita income for the town was $19,577. About 6.5% of families and 10.4% of the population were below the poverty line, including 10.9% of those under age 18 and 4.2% of those age 65 or over.

== Government ==
Charlemont employs the open town meeting form of government, and is led by a Select board. The town has its own police, fire and public works departments. The town's library, Tyler Memorial Library, is connected to the regional library network. Charlemont lies halfway between hospitals in North Adams (North Adams Regional Hospital) and Greenfield (Franklin Medical Center). Greenfield is also the site of most of the county's public services, courthouses and the county jail.

On the state level, Charlemont is represented in the Massachusetts House of Representatives as part of the Second Berkshire district, represented by Paul Mark, which covers central Berkshire County, as well as portions of Hampshire and Franklin Counties. In the Massachusetts Senate, the town is part of the Berkshire, Hampshire and Franklin district, which includes all of Berkshire County and the western portions of Hampshire and Franklin Counties. The town is patrolled by the Second (Shelburne Falls) Station of Troop "B" of the Massachusetts State Police.

On the national level, Charlemont is represented in the United States House of Representatives as part of Massachusetts's 1st congressional district, and has been represented by Richard Neal of Springfield since January 2013. Massachusetts is currently represented in the United States Senate by Senators Ed Markey and Elizabeth Warren.

== Education ==
Charlemont is a member of the Mohawk Trail Regional School District, along with Ashfield, Buckland, Colrain, Hawley, Heath, Plainfield, Rowe, and Shelburne. Students attend Hawlemont Regional Elementary School, which also serves the neighboring town of Hawley which serves K–6. High school students then attend Mohawk Trail Regional High School. There is a private academy in town, the Academy at Charlemont, and other private and religious schools in nearby towns.

The nearest community college, Greenfield Community College, is located in Greenfield. The nearest state college is Massachusetts College of Liberal Arts in North Adams, and the nearest state university is the University of Massachusetts Amherst. The nearest private college is Williams College in Williamstown, with several others located southeast in the Northampton area.

== Points of interest ==
- Alpine skiing: Charlemont is well known for its alpine ski area, Berkshire East Ski Area. Other ski areas once located in Charlemont include Sawmill Hill, the Mohawk Trail Skiers Project, and Snow White. Berkshire East is open from late fall until early spring and features snowmaking and night skiing.
- Hiking: There are multiple popular mountain hikes in Charlemont, accessible via official and unofficial trails, such as Mount Institute, Negus Mountain, Pocumtuck Mountain, and Todd Mountain.
- Water rafting: White water rafting is very popular in Charlemont. Crabapple Whitewater and Berkshire Whitewater are two popular whitewater rafting operations on the Deerfield River. The scenic Mohawk Trail passes through the community.
- Mohawk Park: This small roadside park along Route 2 features Hail to the Sunrise, a statue in tribute to the area's Native American heritage.
- Mountain Biking: In the summer of 2015, the lift accessed, Thunder Mountain Bike Park will open on the slopes of Berkshire East Ski Area.
- Zip Lines: Since 2009, there have been four zip line canopy tours operated in Charlemont.

== Notable people ==
- Catharine Webb Barber (1823–1893), newspaper editor, author
- Robert S. Houston (1820–1902), Wisconsin state legislator, stonemason, and dairy farmer, was born in Charlemont
- Celeste M. A. Winslow (1837–1908), author
