= Colerain Township =

Colerain Township may refer to:

- Colerain Township, Belmont County, Ohio
- Colerain Township, Hamilton County, Ohio
- Colerain Township, Ross County, Ohio
- Colerain Township, Lancaster County, Pennsylvania
- Colerain Township, Bedford County, Pennsylvania
