= Colrain Center Historic District =

Historic district in Massachusetts, United States

- U.S. National Register of Historic Places
- U.S. Historic district
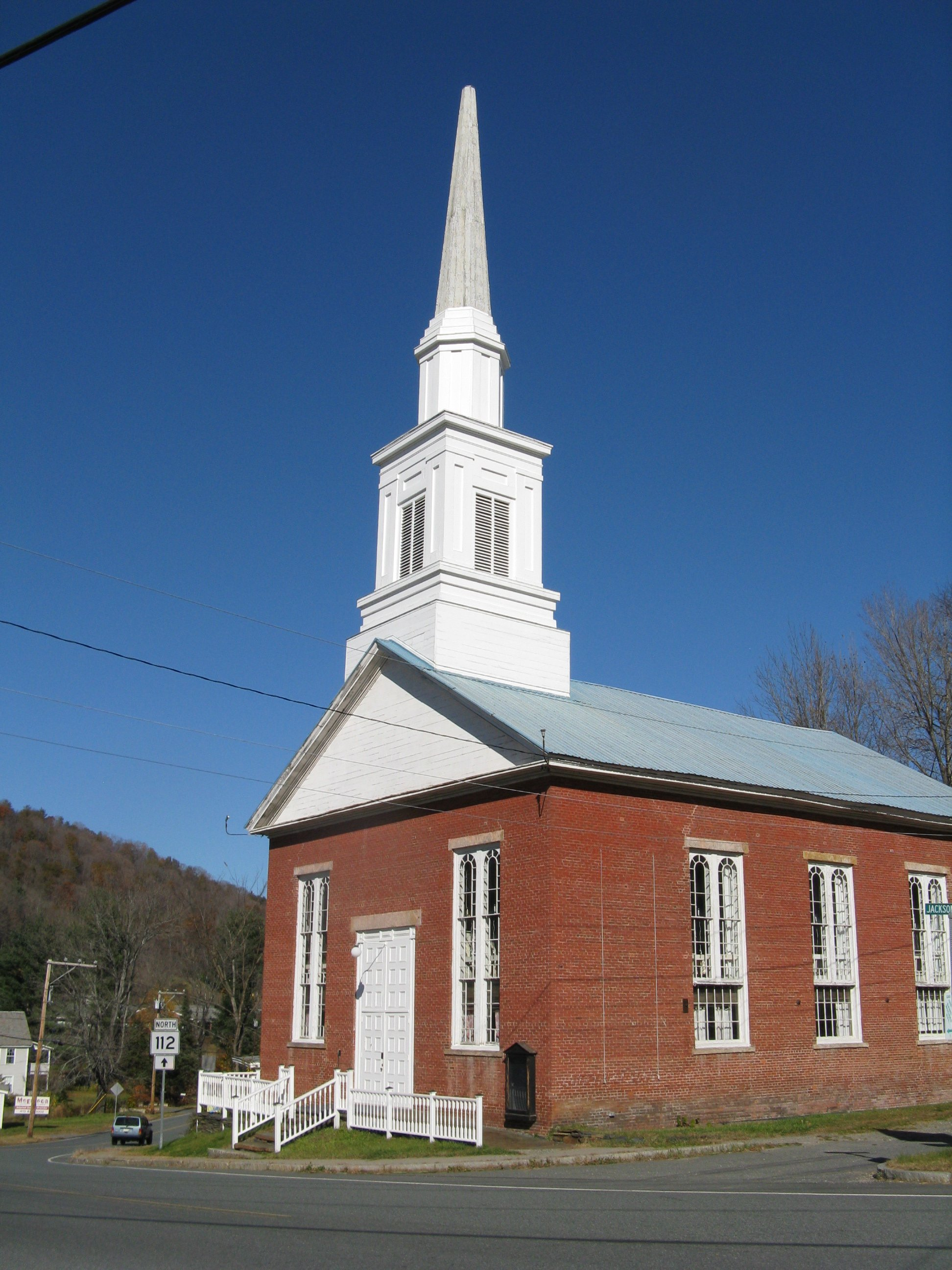
- Brick Meeting House

- Location within Massachusetts Location within the United States
- Location: Colrain, Massachusetts
- Coordinates: 42°40′24″N 72°41′52″W
- Area: 30 acres (12 ha)
- Architect: McLean & Wright; M. R. Drew, et al.
- Architectural style: Federal, Greek Revival
- NRHP reference No.: 06001057
- Added to NRHP: November 15, 2006

The Colrain Center Historic District encompasses the historic center of Colrain, Massachusetts, a rural hill town in north-western Franklin County. The 30-acre (12 ha) district was listed on the National Register of Historic Places in 2006.

== Description and history ==
Colrain was incorporated in 1761, but did not experience significant growth until later in the 18th century. The center began as the location of a local farm, and a bridge which might have been the one that was remade in 2018. The land area available for development in this area is limited by steep hilly terrain and the floodplains of the North River.

The center of the district and the village is the town green, a triangular patch of land at the junction of Main Road, Greenville Road and Jacksonville Road, and it is naturally bounded by the terrain, a steeply sided valley along a branch of the North River. Most of the housing in the district dates from the mid 19th century to the early 20th century, as do its institutional buildings. The Town Hall is a former congregational church, built in the Greek Revival style in 1834. The other former church building is the Methodist Church, built a few years later, but with Gothic Revival features; it was vacant in 2006. The Griswold Public Library building (1908, Classical Revival) is the only institutional building still used for its original purpose; all the others have either been lost or adaptively reused. The oldest house in the district is believed to be the c. 1819 Charles Thompson House at 9 Main Rd; it is typical example of vernacular Federal styling. The Coolidge House at 3 Greenfield Rd. is an early example of Greek Revival architecture, with a three-bay front and a full-width porch. Queen Anne Victorians include the 1895 Cram House at 7 Main Road, which has an octagonal turret, and the elaborate Second Methodist Parsonage at 3 River St.

== See also ==
- National Register of Historic Places listings in Franklin County, Massachusetts
