= Berkshire East Ski Resort =

Ski resort in Charlemont, Massachusetts, United States

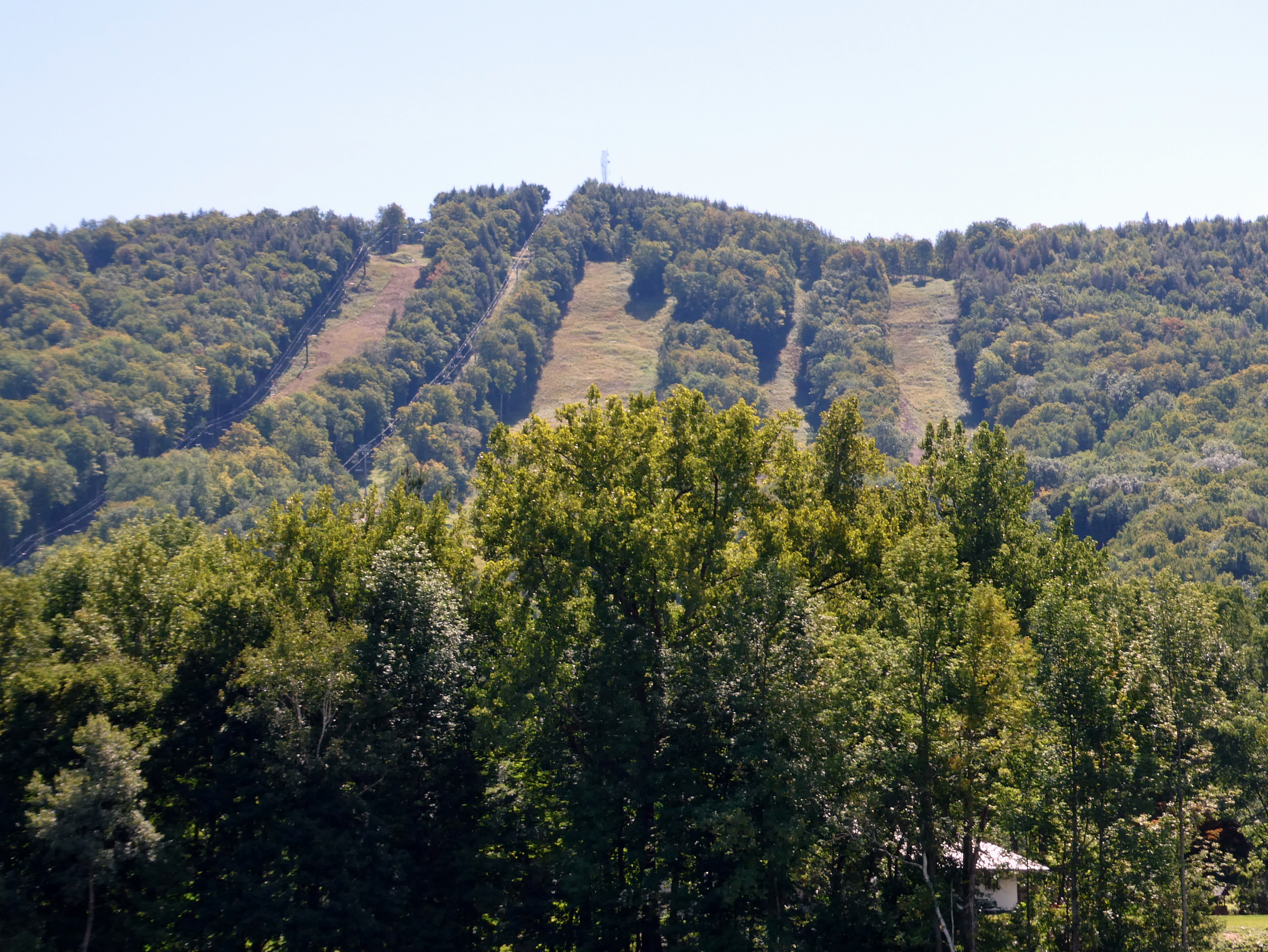
- The resort seen from Charlemont in 2022

- Location in Massachusetts Berkshire East Ski Resort (the United States)
- Location: Charlemont / Hawley, Massachusetts, U.S.
- Nearest city: Greenfield
- Coordinates: 42°37′15″N 72°52′37″W
- Status: Active
- Vertical: 1,180 ft (360 m)
- Top elevation: 1,840 ft (561 m)
- Base elevation: 520 ft (158 m)
- Trails: 45
- Longest run: 2.5 miles (4.0 km)
- Lift system: 4 chairs: (3 quads, 1 double); 2 surface lifts
- Terrain parks: Yes
- Snowfall: 110 in (279 cm)
- Snowmaking: 100%
- Night skiing: Yes
- Website: www.berkshireeast.com

Berkshire East Mountain Resort is a medium-sized alpine ski area in the northeastern United States, located in the Berkshires on Mount Institute in Charlemont and Hawley, Massachusetts.

== History ==
=== Thunder Mountain Ski Area ===
Organized skiing started on Mt. Institute in the mid-1950s when Arthur Parker opened a small rope tow operation. Due to weather and other difficulties, it closed after one short season.

Parker spent the balance of the decade gathering investors for a much larger operation on the same mountain. The first double chairlift, a Mueller, was installed for the grand re-opening 1961-62 season. A second double chairlift, another Mueller, was installed in 1962.

Notable skiers during this time included former Massachusetts Governor Endicott Peabody and U.S. Senator Ted Kennedy.

New ownership took over in late 1965, changing the name to Berkshire East at the end of the decade.

=== Berkshire East Mountain Resort ===
The ownership group struggled, trying a variety of ill-fated expansion plans. By 1975, Berkshire East was bankrupt and outdated with two partially installed chairlifts and two antiquated Mueller chairlifts. Current management soon took over and began a steady series of investments.

A Hall double chairlift was installed in 1978. A fourth chairlift, an SLI, was also installed in the late 1970s.

In 1995, the first Mueller double chairlift was replaced with a Poma triple chairlift. A Hall double chairlift was added in 2001. In 2003, the second Mueller double chairlift was replaced with a Borvig-Leitner quad chairlift.

In 2008, Berkshire East replaced a novice handle tow with a magic carpet lift.

As of 2008, the ski area has 45 trails and five lifts, in addition to the tubing slope and lift. Berkshire East is currently the only alpine ski area in Franklin County open to the public.

In 2010, the Diamond Express Hall double chairlift (1978) was replaced with a Poma triple chairlift.

In 2011, the ski area added a PowerWind 56 900 kW wind turbine. This addition, makes Berkshire East the first ski area in the world to be 100% powered by onsite renewable energy.

In 2014, the Summit Triple lift (1995) was replaced by a brand new SkyTrac quad chairlift with a moving carpet loading area. The new lift will run at a faster speed than typical fixed grip lifts with a moving carpet that moves skiers into the loading area and assists with loading onto the faster moving chairs. The old Poma Summit Triple lift was moved to Catamount Mountain Resort in Egremont, Massachusetts.

In 2023, the ski area added a Leitner-Poma high-speed detachable quad chairlift. The lift was named the T-Bar Express in honor of a removed T-Bar surface lift that ran along the same area of the Competition trail.

In 2024, the ski area began the process of removing the Mountain-top Triple Poma chairlift. As of the 2024-2025 season the lower terminal, the haul rope and the chairs have been removed with the towers and upper terminal remaining in place.

== Terrain and Lifts ==
Berkshire East offers 1,180 feet vertical drop, with 180 acres of skiable terrain. It has mixed terrain from beginner to expert level ability: 30% beginner runs, 35% intermediate, 30% advanced, and 5% expert runs. Berkshire also has 4 chairlifts.

Name	Type	Manufacturer	Built	Length (feet)	Notes	Terrain
T-Bar Express	High-Speed Quad	Leitner-Poma	2023	3050	First detachable lift installed at resort	Serves all abilities and skiable terrain at the resort. This includes an array of expert trails, the intermediate Mohawk, and the Outback beginner complex.
Summit Quad	Quad	Skytrac	2014	3145	This lift also includes a loading carpet which increases the overall speed of the lift.	Serves all abilities and runs parallel to the T-Bar Express, servicing the same terrain.
Wilderness Peak	Quad	Borvig	2003	2560	Relocated from CO	Services beginner and intermediate terrain on the west side of the mountain, including the intermediate Wilderness Peak complex and the beginner Exhibition and Roundabout trails.
Top Notch	Double	Hall	2001	800	Relocated from Mt. Tom, MA.	Services the Top Notch beginner slopes.

Berkshire East also has a single Magic Carpet, located on the Bobcat novice slope.

== Snowmaking ==
Berkshire East can make snow on all of its trails. The snowmaking system is composed almost exclusively of fan guns. The snowmaking fleet is dominated by SMI Polecats and Wizzards, as well as Areco fan guns.

== Racing ==
Berkshire East and Thunder Mountain have both been known for strong racing programs. Numerous successful racers, ranging from Massachusetts high school state champions to United States Ski Team members have trained and raced at Berkshire East. Berkshire East frequently hosts USSA and MIAA slalom and giant slalom championship races. Additionally, it is a frequent venue for ski mountaineering races.

== Involvement with Burke Mountain and Smugglers Notch ==
Berkshire East's owner Jon Shaefer is the CEO of Bear Den Partners, a New England ski resort investment group. On May 2nd, 2025, Bear Den Partners closed on its purchase of Burke Mountain Resort in Vermont. Due to the purchase, Berkshire East and Catamount Unlimited Summit Season Pass Holders receive two weekend or holiday lift tickets at Burke, unlimited midweek, non-holiday skiing at Burke, 50% off additional weekend or holiday days, and 25% off lodging stays at Burke Mountain Hotel. Berkshire East and Catamount Locals and Weekday Summit Pass Holders get unlimited midweek, non-holiday skiing at Burke, and 25% off lodging stays at Burke Mountain Hotel.

On February 11, 2026, Bear Den Partners acquired a majority ownership interest in Smugglers’ Notch Resort from Bill Stritzler, who has owned Smuggs for 29 years and whose family will retain an ownership stake in the resort. Stritzler’s daughter and Smuggs CEO Lisa Howe will serve as an advisor on the future of the mountain.

== Summer Activities ==
In 2009, Berkshire East announced the construction of multiple zip lines.

Berkshire East has some of the longest and fastest zip lines on the East Coast. They offer two different zipline tours. Their Valley Jump Tour is for ages 12+ and zips over the Deerfield River Valley at speeds of up to 60 miles. The lines range in length from 1,000’ to 2,600’ and approaching 200’ in the air. Their Mountain Top Tour is for ages 8+ and zips over the Deerfield River Valley on seven zip lines ranging in length from 280' to 900’.

In 2013, Berkshire East was given approval to build the longest Alpine Coaster in North America, and featured a mile (1.6 km) of steel track. In the summer of 2014, the new mountain coaster was constructed, and was named the Thunderbolt Mountain Coaster. The Thunderbolt takes riders up 1,580 feet of up-track through the forest before the cart disengages and gravity takes over. The 3,870 feet of downhill track are designed with swooping turns, banked corners, rolling drops, and 360° turns. Each cart is equipped with its own braking system.

In the fall of 2014, construction began on a new downhill mountain bike park. The downhill mountain bike park was named Thunder Mountain Bike Park and was built by Gravity Logic.

In 2016, Berkshire East built it's Aerial Adventure Park. The Aerial Adventure Park is a series of self-guided challenges in the trees with two courses to choose from. The lower course is easier and can accommodate ages 7 and up and a minimum height of 48 inches tall. The upper course is harder and can accommodate ages 9 and up and a minimum height of 55 inches tall. Each course has platforms suspended in the trees, connected by wooden bridges, rope swings, rolling zip-lines, TrueBlue free falls, and other challenging obstacles to navigate. Everything is challenge by choice and customers can go at their own pace.

== Snow Tubing ==
In 2007, Berkshire East expanded operations beyond skiing and snowboarding by opening a snow tubing slope, serviced by a magic carpet surface lift. The snow tubing lanes are 500' long. Riders are required to be 42 inches tall. In 2026, Berkshire East added double tubes, allowing two people to ride in the same snow tube.
