= List of ghost towns in Massachusetts =

An example of a "Babson Boulder" at Dogtown, Massachusetts

This is an incomplete list of ghost towns in Massachusetts. Ghost towns can include sites in various states of disrepair and abandonment. Some sites no longer have any trace of civilization and have reverted to pasture land or empty fields. Other sites are unpopulated but still have standing buildings. Some sites may even have a sizable, though small population, but there are far fewer citizens than in its grander historic past.

== Classification ==
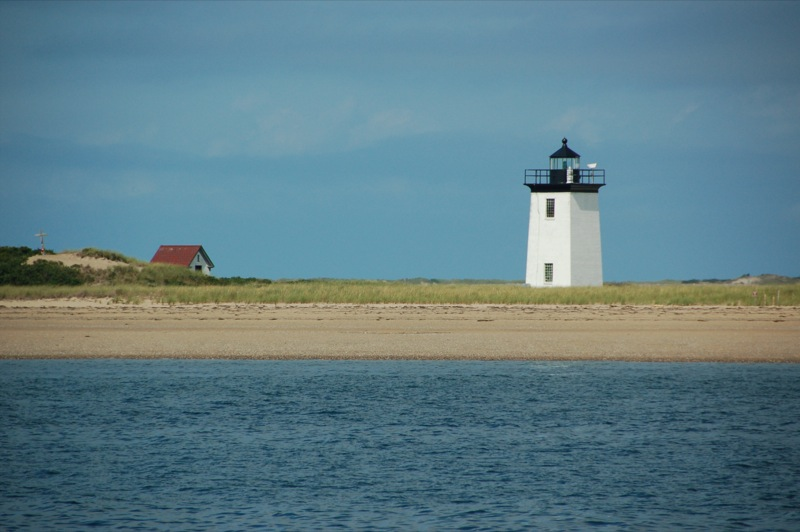
A lighthouse and part of a Civil War artillery battery are all that remain at Long Point.

=== Barren site ===
- Sites no longer in existence
- Sites that have been destroyed
- Covered with water
- Reverted to pasture
- May have a few difficult to find foundations/footings at most

=== Neglected site ===
- Only rubble left
- All buildings uninhabited
- Roofless building ruins
- Some buildings or houses still standing, but majority are roofless

=== Abandoned site ===
- Building or houses still standing
- Buildings and houses all abandoned
- No population, except caretaker
- Site no longer in existence except for one or two buildings, for example old church, grocery store

=== Semi-abandoned site ===
- Building or houses still standing
- Buildings and houses largely abandoned
- Few residents
- Many abandoned buildings
- Small population

=== Historic community ===
- Building or houses still standing
- Still a busy community
- Smaller than its boom years
- Population has decreased dramatically, to one fifth or less.

== List by county ==
=== Barnstable County ===
- Long Point, also known as Provincetown, was built on a narrow and isolated peninsula on the far end of Cape Cod, and the isolated geography cut the town off from access to freshwater and made it extremely vulnerable to ocean storms.
- Whitewash Village

=== Berkshire County ===
- Questing

=== Bristol County ===
- Norton Furnace

=== Essex County ===
- Dogtown

=== Franklin County ===
- Catamount
- Davis
- Hillsboro

=== Hampshire County ===
- Enfield, which was submerged to form Quabbin Reservoir
- Greenwich, which was submerged to form Quabbin Reservoir
- Prescott.

=== Middlesex County ===
- Haywardville, a mill town established in the mid-19th century. By 1870 it was deep in decline. In 1894 it was turned into a park and would become Middlesex Fells Reservation.

=== Worcester County ===
- Dana
