= Davis, Massachusetts =

Abandoned location in Massachusetts, U.S.

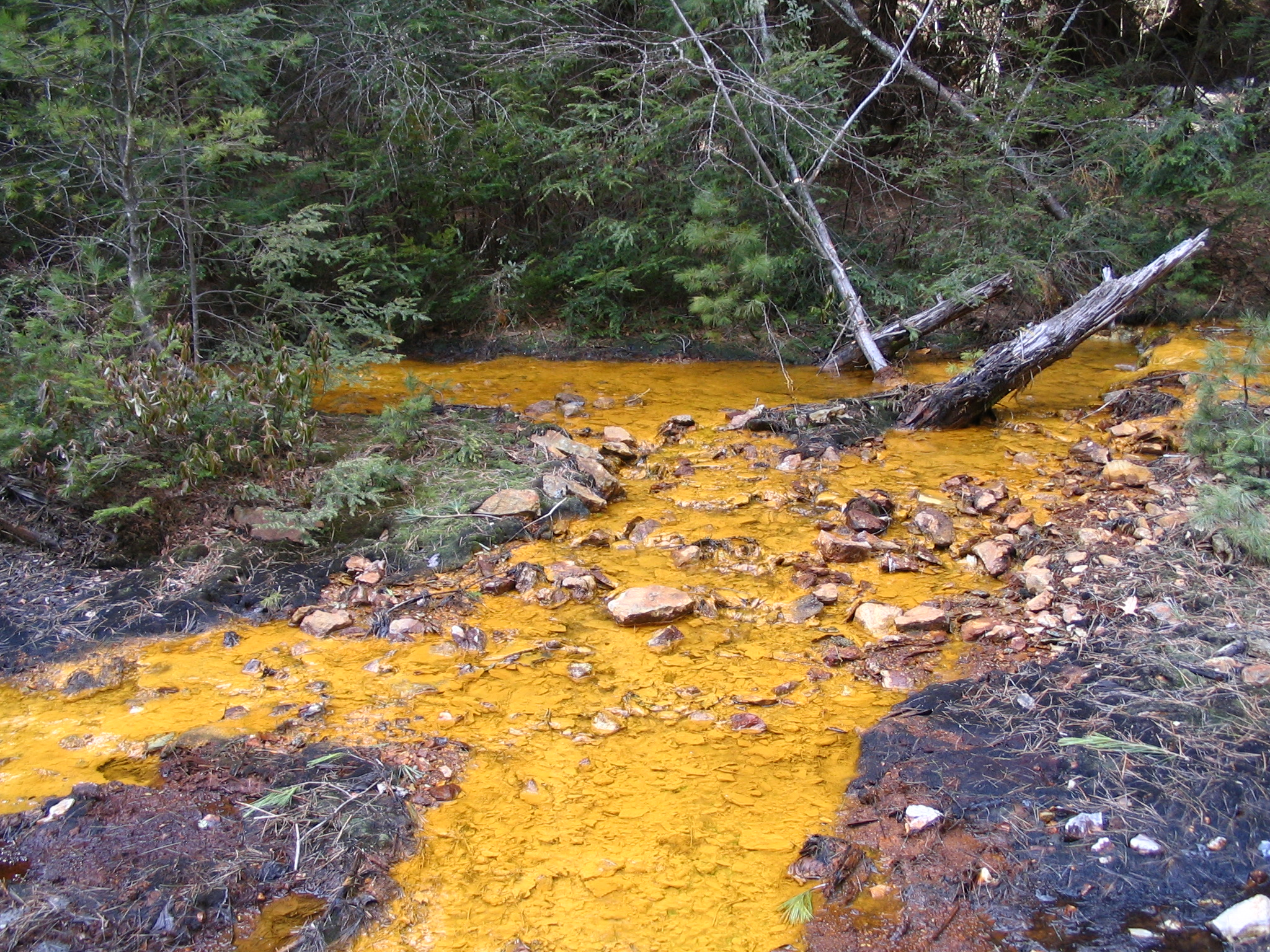
Acid mine drainage at the Davis Mine

Davis, Massachusetts, is the abandoned location of the Davis Pyrite Mine, located in the town of Rowe, Massachusetts. Once the largest iron pyrite mine in Massachusetts, Davis grew to be a decent sized mining village at the beginnings of the Second Industrial Revolution (1870–1915). But in 1911, a non-fatal collapse of the mine due to "poor mining practices" ended the nearly 30-year run. By 1937, the mining camp had faded, and all that remained was a blacksmith shop and about 150 cellar holes.

== Location ==
Davis is located at 42°41′52″N 72°52′13″W.

The abandoned mining village is located in the Town of Rowe, in Franklin County, about 3 mi (4.8 km) north of Charlemont and 2 mi (3.2 km) south-southeast of Rowe. The area is east of Davis Mine Road and west of Davis Mine Brook. Both Rowe (2000 pop - 351) and Charlemont (2000 pop - 1358) are small towns in the rolling hills of northwestern Massachusetts. Rowe was established in 1762 and incorporated in 1785, and Charlemont was established in 1742 and incorporated in 1765.

== Mining camp settlement ==
An iron pyrite outcrop was discovered and a mine developed by H.J. Davis around 1882. The eastern section of Rowe, called Davis, became the center of activity because of the profitable operation of Davis Sulfur Ore Mine for twenty-nine years. The Davis Mine supplied a major economic boost to both Rowe and Charlemont.

A good-sized mining camp developed at the site, which included a blacksmith shop, butcher shop, electric lighting, and at least 150 homes. There were four mining shafts, and a period photo of Shaft #1 shows a large enclosed headframe (shafthouse) tram and what appears to be a reduction works of some kind (smokestack and large building). It is said the mine produced about 100 tons of pyrite a day, and the iron sulfide was used to produce sulfuric acid, a commercially important chemical. Charlemont claims to be the first electrified town in Massachusetts, so it is possible that power was then run to the mining camp. The miners are said to have earned $12–15 per day (that claim has not been verified), which in those days was excellent pay.

== Economic impact ==
Until its 1911 cave-in, the Davis mine had become a mainstay of Rowe’s economy. It was a lucrative source of iron pyrite. Popularly known as fool's gold, pyrite can be processed to yield substantial quantities of sulfide, which can in turn be used to manufacture sulfuric acid. (The mine also yielded smaller but, nevertheless, financially significant amounts of copper.) The pyrite deposit is located in mica and quartz schists, which includes the presence of chalcopyrite and sphalerite. Average sulfur content was reported to be 47 percent, and copper content about 1.5 percent.

By 1875, Charlemont's industrial base was limited to several sawmills, two scythe snatches (handles) shops and a chair making operation. With the opening and success of the Davis iron pyrite and talc mine in Rowe in the 1880s, a prospecting craze developed in the area. In 1892 the main shaft was 501 feet deep, and production was reported to be 334,552 tons of pyrite.

Mining operations were also opened in Charlemont during this period and included the Massachusetts Talc Company in the village of Zoar. The merchants of Charlemont Center benefited greatly from this prospecting craze. Two shops opened in the early 1890s, which were important to the Town's economy for a number of years. In 1891, W.M. Pratt established a rake handle factory and the following year, H.H. Frary opened a carriage shop, which also produced wooden spools for the silk mills in Northampton.

During its 29-year working life, the Davis Mine pumped thousands of tax dollars into the town’s coffers, and became a local tourist attraction as well. Visitors could climb an observation tower above the main shaft for a panoramic view of the bustling operation, which featured on-site blacksmith and butcher shops, a steady traffic of horse-drawn ore and coal wagons and the town’s first electric lighting. The annual payroll amounted to $100,000, and local farmers made extra income supplying the mine with timber and firewood, while selling fruit, vegetables and dairy products to the workers.

== Today ==
Little remains of the camp today. The area has several cellar holes of defunct houses, and second-growth forest has staked its claim to much of the land along these unpaved backroads. However, the Davis Mine is a major study area as there are ecological concerns due to a pollution plume exuding from the old workings down into Davis Mine Creek. When the mine collapsed, groundwater seeped into the old workings, and now flows out and downhill into the creek. The University of Massachusetts Amherst has used this as a study site. The remains of the Davis Mine are on private property (it is posted), so access is not available. Other abandoned mines of the Davis Mine period in the Charlemont area within the Hawley "Mineral Belt" stratabound massive sulfide deposit are the Hawks or Mt. Peak Mine and the Mary Louise or Davenport Mine.

== Pollution study ==
Acid mine drainage (AMD), occurring at abandoned mines, is a water problem characterized by low pH and high levels of metals. An interdisciplinary research team from the University of Massachusetts Amherst is studying why the AMD from the abandoned sulfide mine is slowly cleaning itself over time. The group brings together experts from the fields of microbiology, geology, engineering, and science education, to determine the extent and rate of bioremediation.

According to professors in the study, the overflowing groundwater drains out of the old mine shafts, and flows down the stream channel. The drainage waters are more acidic than vinegar, with pH values around 2, and carry large loads of metals, including copper, zinc, and iron. In other areas of the country, similar acid-mine drainage from former coal or gold mines can mobilize additional undesirable contaminants. Researchers stress, however, that there is no threat to the local environment or the area's water supply, because the iron sulfide in the Davis mine contains few hazardous impurities. This makes the site an ideal subject for examining the natural processes that are contained in the drainage.

Researchers have said their findings may enable quicker natural cleanups not just at the Davis mine, but at others throughout the country and the world. The project has received a $1.59-million grant from the "Biocomplexity in the Environment" program of the National Science Foundation.

== See also ==
- List of ghost towns in Massachusetts

== Notes and references ==
- Luciano, Elizabeth, Bio-Medicine Web Portal Article, 2002
- McCarthy, Helen, The Story of the Davis Mine, Rowe Historical Society, 1966, 1977
- O'Carroll, Christopher, UMass Magazine, Fall 2003
- Speck, Gary B. Davis Mine: Franklin Co., Massachusetts. Ancestry.com Community: Gary B. Speck Publications, 2006.)
- Stauber, C.L The Use of Local Carbon Sources in Encouraging Acid Mine Drainage Bioremediation
