= Rowe, Massachusetts =

- Town
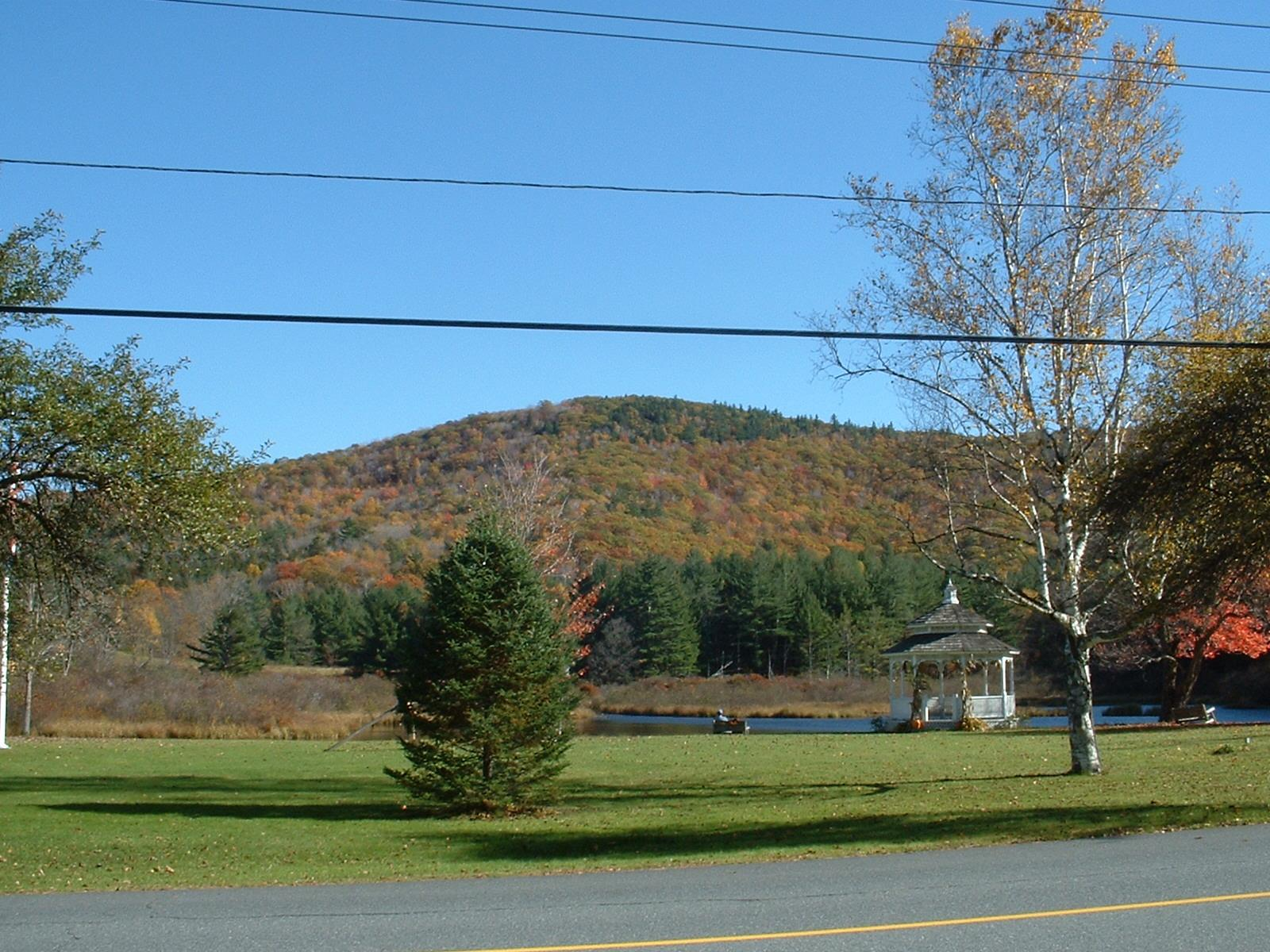
- Adams Mountain, with the Village Green and Mill Pond in the foreground

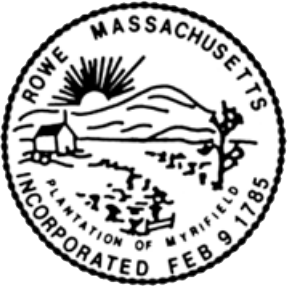
- Seal

- Location in Franklin County in Massachusetts
- Coordinates: 42°41′36″N 72°54′00″W
- Country: United States
- State: Massachusetts
- County: Franklin
- Settled: 1762
- Incorporated: 1785

Government
  - Type: Open town meeting

Area
  - Total: 24.0 sq mi (62.2 km^{2})
  - Land: 23.4 sq mi (60.7 km^{2})
  - Water: 0.58 sq mi (1.5 km^{2})
- Elevation: 1,467 ft (447 m)

Population (2020)
  - Total: 424
  - Density: 18.1/sq mi (6.99/km^{2})
- Time zone: UTC−5 (Eastern)
  - Summer (DST): UTC−4 (Eastern)
- ZIP Code: 01367
- Area code: 413
- FIPS code: 25-58335
- GNIS feature ID: 0618174
- Website: www.rowe-ma.gov

Rowe is a town in Franklin County, Massachusetts, United States. The population was 424 at the 2020 census.

== History ==
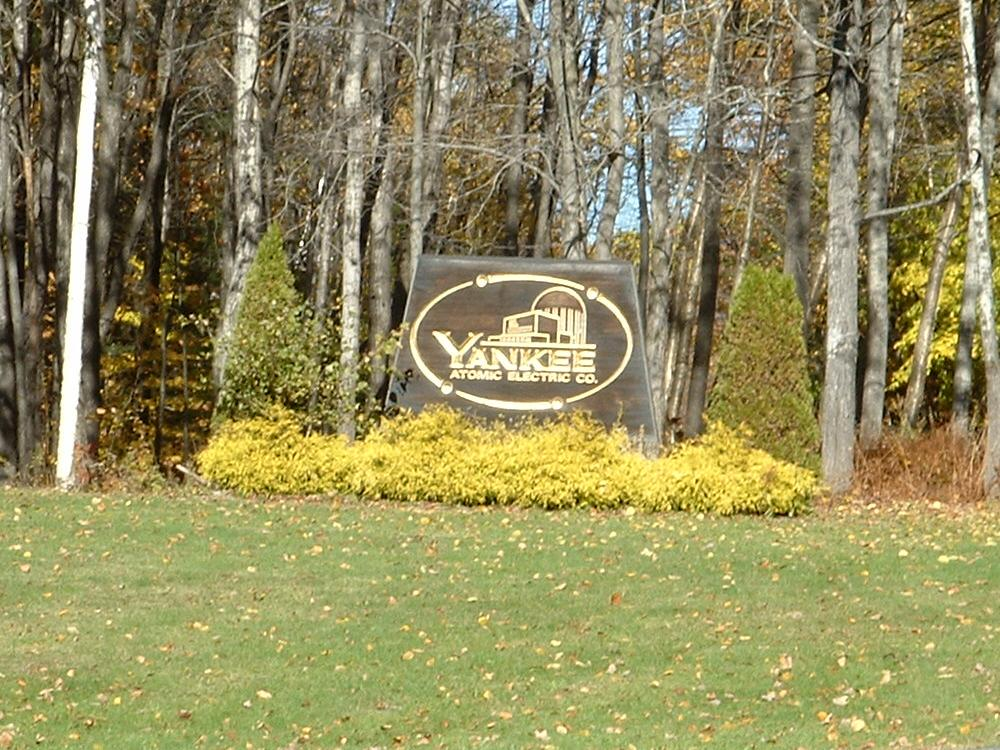
The entrance to Yankee Rowe Nuclear Power Station

Rowe was the site of fishing and foraging for local Native American tribes. The area was first visited by white settlers in 1744, and was the site of a fort to guard against raids. In 1762, the town lands were purchased by the Rev. Cornelius Jones, who named it "Myrifield" after the Greek word for "thousand". The town had enough settlers by 1785 to have it incorporated as a town, renamed by the Massachusetts General Court after John Rowe, a prominent Boston merchant.

The town of Rowe grew around mills on the river, but also had other industries, including sulfur, talc and soapstone mining. This was nowhere more evident than in the now abandoned settlement at the Davis Mine. In the late 1880s, with the addition of the railroad along the river, the area had become somewhat of a small resort town. But, by the advent of the 1900s, most industry had begun to dry up, leaving the town fairly rural until the 1950s. At that point, with the "baby boom" underway, Rowe became the site of Yankee Rowe Nuclear Power Station, the first nuclear power plant in New England, near the Sherman Dam along the Vermont border. The plant was in operation from 1960 to 1992, and the plant is now completely decommissioned, with the nuclear waste planned to be transported to Yucca Mountain's containment facilities, or another facility in the event that Yucca Mountain remains closed as a result of Harry Reid's lobbying to keep the planned nuclear waste repository closed permanently.

The Rowe Center was found in 1924 and continues to be an important attraction.

== Geography ==
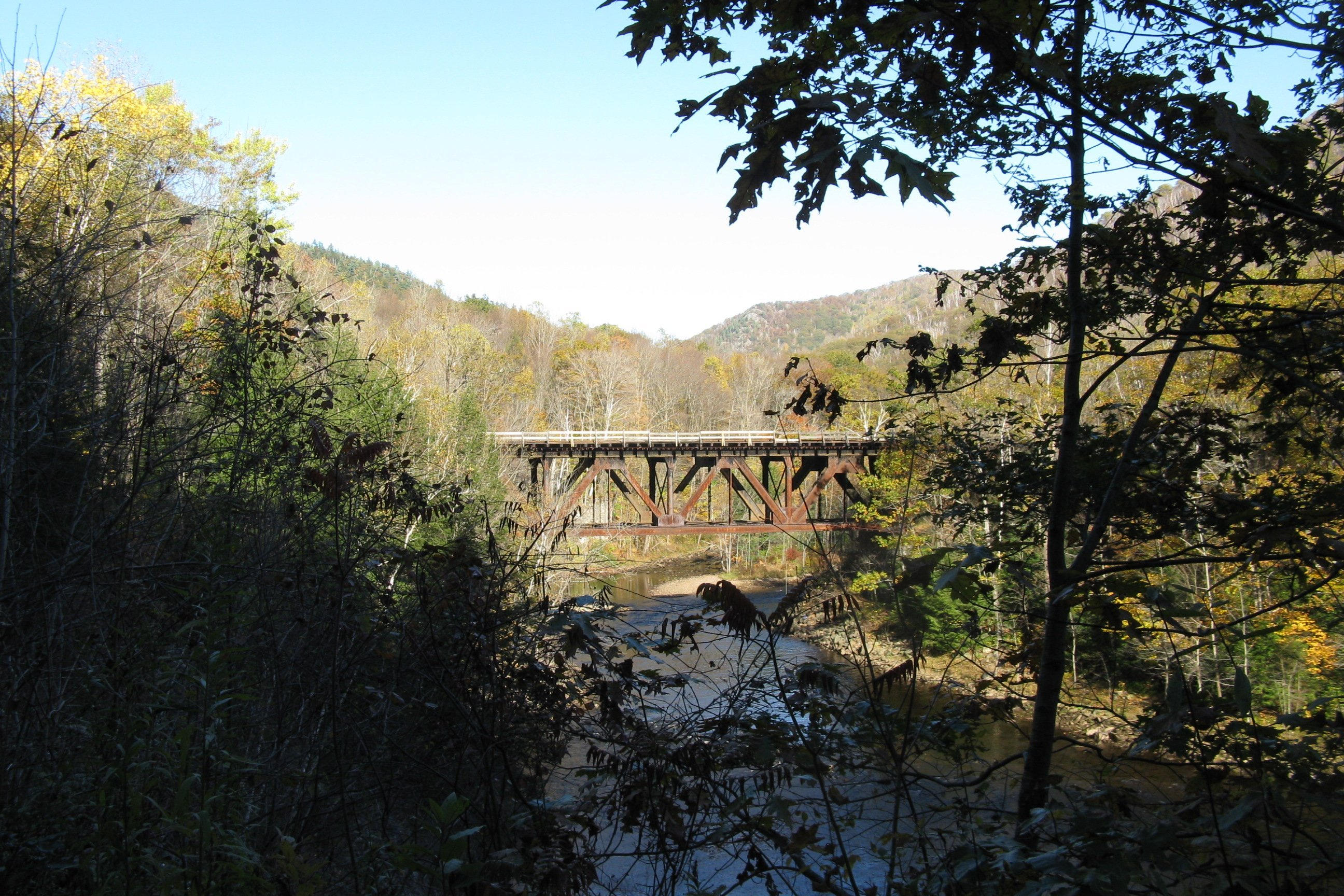
Railroad bridge across the Deerfield River between Monroe and Rowe

According to the United States Census Bureau, the town has a total area of 24.0 square miles (62.2 km^{2}), of which 23.4 square miles (60.7 km^{2}) is land and 0.58 square miles (1.5 km^{2}), or 2.41%, is water. Rowe lies along the northern border of Franklin County and Massachusetts, bordered by Windham County, Vermont, to the north and Berkshire County to the west. The town is bordered by Whitingham, Vermont, to the north, Heath to the east, Charlemont to the south, and Florida and Monroe to the west. Rowe is located 23 miles (37 km) west-northwest of Greenfield, 53 miles (85 km) north-northwest of Springfield, and 112 miles (180 km) west-northwest of Boston.

Rowe lies along the eastern bank of the Deerfield River, which is dammed near the Vermont border to form the Sherman Reservoir. The town has two other large bodies of water: the Upper Bear Swamp Reservoir and Pelham Lake, which feeds Pelham Brook, a tributary of the river. The town is hilly, with two main ridges on either side of Pelham Brook. Near the southwestern corner of town is Negus Mountain, along the western ridge, and along the eastern ridge lies Todd Mountain and Adams Mountain, the highest point in town. Much of the land southeast of Pelham Lake is part of Pelham Lake Park, which extends to the mountains. There are also two small units of Monroe State Forest in town.

Rowe is one of a handful of small towns in Massachusetts which has no state highways. (Nearly half of these towns are on Martha's Vineyard and Nantucket, with the majority of the rest in central and western Massachusetts.) The nearest state highways are Massachusetts Route 8A, which runs through neighboring Heath, and Route 2 (the Mohawk Trail), which runs through Charlemont and Florida. The nearest expressway, Interstate 91, passes through the center of the county, near the junction of the Deerfield River and the Connecticut River. A short section of railroad tracks leading westward to the Hoosac Tunnel passes through the southwestern corner of town, but the town is otherwise not served by rail, bus or air service. The nearest bus and small air service is in North Adams, the nearest Amtrak service is in Greenfield, and the nearest national air service can be reached at Albany International Airport in New York.

=== Neighborhoods ===
The following are locally known neighborhood/village areas within the Rowe town borders:

- Camp Rowe 42.690°N 72.898°W
- Davis 42.683°N 72.865°W
- Monroe Bridge 42.722°N 72.941°W
- Rowe 42.693°N 72.900°W
- Zoar 42.653°N 72.931°W

=== Climate ===
Climate data for Rowe 3 NE, Massachusetts, 1991–2020 normals: 1735ft (529m)
Month	Jan	Feb	Mar	Apr	May	Jun	Jul	Aug	Sep	Oct	Nov	Dec	Year
Mean daily maximum °F (°C)	28.9 (−1.7)	31.3 (−0.4)	38.6 (3.7)	50.9 (10.5)	62.9 (17.2)	70.4 (21.3)	75.1 (23.9)	74.6 (23.7)	68.3 (20.2)	56.2 (13.4)	44.3 (6.8)	34.4 (1.3)	53.0 (11.7)
Daily mean °F (°C)	20.0 (−6.7)	22.0 (−5.6)	29.3 (−1.5)	41.2 (5.1)	52.4 (11.3)	61.1 (16.2)	65.9 (18.8)	64.6 (18.1)	57.9 (14.4)	46.2 (7.9)	36.0 (2.2)	26.5 (−3.1)	43.6 (6.4)
Mean daily minimum °F (°C)	11.1 (−11.6)	12.6 (−10.8)	19.9 (−6.7)	31.5 (−0.3)	41.8 (5.4)	51.8 (11.0)	56.6 (13.7)	54.6 (12.6)	47.5 (8.6)	36.2 (2.3)	27.6 (−2.4)	18.6 (−7.4)	34.2 (1.2)
Average precipitation inches (mm)	4.25 (108)	3.71 (94)	4.39 (112)	4.37 (111)	4.01 (102)	4.65 (118)	4.82 (122)	4.82 (122)	4.60 (117)	4.99 (127)	3.88 (99)	4.66 (118)	53.15 (1,350)
Source: NOAA

== Demographics ==
Historical population
Year	Pop.	±%
1790	443	—
1840	700	+58.0%
1850	659	−5.9%
1860	619	−6.1%
1870	581	−6.1%
1880	502	−13.6%
1890	541	+7.8%
1900	549	+1.5%
1910	456	−16.9%
1920	333	−27.0%
1930	298	−10.5%
1940	233	−21.8%
1950	199	−14.6%
1960	231	+16.1%
1970	277	+19.9%
1980	336	+21.3%
1990	378	+12.5%
2000	351	−7.1%
2010	393	+12.0%
2020	424	+7.9%
2024*	419	−1.2%
* = population estimate. Source: United States census records and Population Estimates Program data.

At the 2000 census, there were 351 people, 154 households and 105 families residing in the town. By population, Rowe ranks 24th out of the 26 cities and towns in Franklin County, and 344th out of the 351 cities and towns in Massachusetts. The population density was 14.9 per square mile (5.8/km^{2}), which ranks 24th in the county and 345th in the Commonwealth. There were 209 housing units at an average density of 8.9 per square mile (3.4/km^{2}). The racial makeup of the town was 99.72% White, 0.28% from other races. Hispanic or Latino of any race were 1.14% of the population.

There were 154 households, of which 22.7% had children under the age of 18 living with them, 59.1% were married couples living together, 5.8% had a female householder with no husband present, and 31.8% were non-families. Of all households 26.0% were made up of individuals, and 11.0% had someone living alone who was 65 years of age or older. The average household size was 2.28 and the average family size was 2.75.

Of the population 19.7% were under the age of 18, 4.3% from 18 to 24, 21.1% from 25 to 44, 36.2% from 45 to 64, and 18.8% who were 65 years of age or older. The median age was 48 years. For every 100 females, there were 90.8 males. For every 100 females age 18 and over, there were 93.2 males.

The median household income was $41,944 and the median family income was $53,750. Males had a median income of $32,143 compared with $28,438 for females. The per capita income for the town was $28,134. None of the families and 2.8% of the population were living below the poverty line, including no under-eighteens and 3.1% of those over 64.

== Government ==
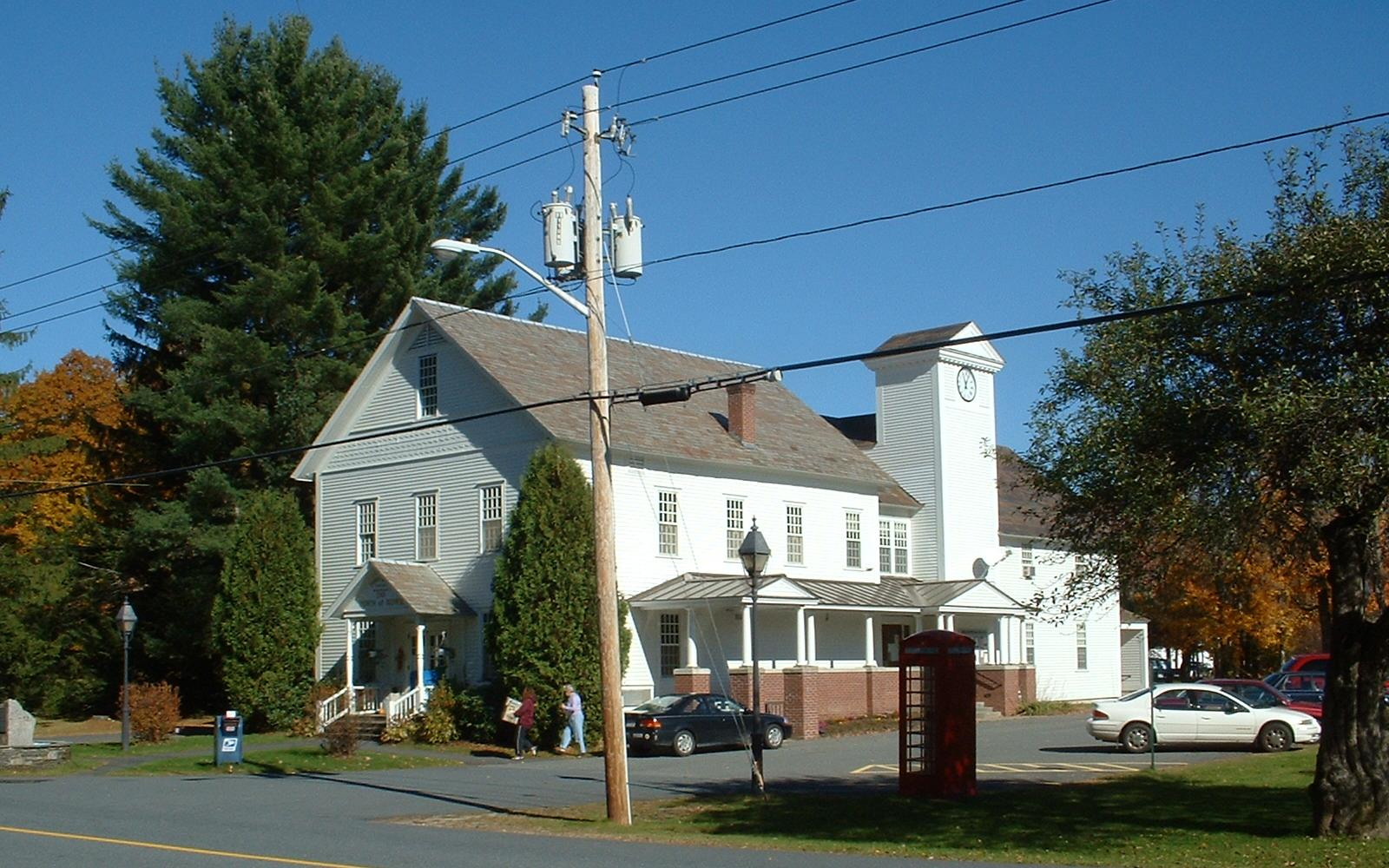
Rowe Town Hall

Rowe employs the open town meeting form of government, and is led by a three-person Board of Selectmen.

The town has a police station, which also patrols neighboring Monroe, as well as a fire station, a library connected to the regional library network, and a post office, all of which are located near the Town Hall at the center of town. The nearest hospital, North Adams Regional Hospital, is located in North Adams.

On the state level, Rowe is represented in the Massachusetts House of Representatives as part of the First Franklin district, represented by Natalie Blais. In the Massachusetts Senate, the town is part of the Berkshire, Hampden, Franklin and Hampshire district, represented by Paul W. Mark. The town is patrolled by the Second (Shelburne Falls) Station of Troop "B" of the Massachusetts State Police.

On the national level, Rowe is represented in the United States House of Representatives as part of Massachusetts's 1st congressional district, and has been represented by Richard Neal of Springfield since January 2013. Massachusetts is represented in the United States Senate by Senator Elizabeth Warren and Senator Ed Markey.

Rachel Lewis is the Rowe town nurse.

== Education ==
Rowe's school system is a sub-system in the nine-town Mohawk Trail / Hawlemont Regional School District, which serves much of western Franklin County. Town students attend the Rowe Elementary School from pre-kindergarten through sixth grades, and all students in the district attend Mohawk Trail Regional High School in Buckland. There is a private academy in neighboring Charlemont, and other private and religious schools in nearby North Adams.

The nearest community college, Greenfield Community College, is located in Greenfield. The nearest state college is Massachusetts College of Liberal Arts in North Adams, and the nearest state university is the University of Massachusetts Amherst. The nearest private college is Williams College in Williamstown, with several others located southeast in the Northampton/Amherst area.

== Points of interest ==
The Rowe Center is a Unitarian Universalist organization that began in 1924. It offers a variety of summer camp options for youth, as well as adult workshops and spiritual retreats. The summer camp was founded by Reverend Anita Pickett in 1924 for young people.

The Rowe Historical Society, located at 282 Zoar Road, operates the Kemp-McCarthy Museum. Information on the museum, its collections and the calendar of special events is available at www.rowehistoricalsociety.org.

The former mining village, and current ghost town, of Davis, Massachusetts is located in the eastern part of town, near Pelham Lake.
