= Norton Furnace, Massachusetts =

- Ghost town
- Nicknames: Copperworks Mills, Norton Village
- Location within Massachusetts Location within the United States
- Coordinates: 41°56′19″N 71°09′34″W
- Country: United States
- State: Massachusetts
- County: Bristol
- Elevation: 66 ft (20 m)
- Time zone: UTC-5 (Eastern (EST))
  - Summer (DST): UTC-4 (EDT)
- GNIS feature ID: 606288

Norton Furnace is a ghost town in Bristol County, Massachusetts, United States. The settlement was located approximately 2 mi (3.2 km) south of Norton.

The general area where Norton Furnace was located, between Norton and Oakland, is today known as Meadowbrook (at Meadow Brook Pond). The Furnace operated by the Wading River which junctions with the Three Mile River; these rivers were essential to the daily operations of the furnace.

== History ==
A furnace for manufacturing iron was established here in 1825 by Annes A. Lincoln, Jr. By 1837, it employed 25 people.

The early settlement was known as "Norton Furnace", "Copperworks Village", and "Norton Mills".

By 1850, the settlement had 25 houses and a store.

Two companies located there—Norton Copper Works, and the Norton Furnace Company—remained active until the 1890s, after which the Norton Copper Works moved to Worcester and the Norton Furnace Company moved to near Boston.

A branch of the Old Colony Railroad ran through the settlement, and by 1871 a station was located there.

A post office was located there as early as 1899. The Meadowbrook post office was located there from 1902 to 1912.

Today the ghost town is a part of the L.A foster Wildlife Refuge. Although most of the ghost town is gone, remnants of the town are found within overgrown paths following The Wading River in Norton Massachusetts.

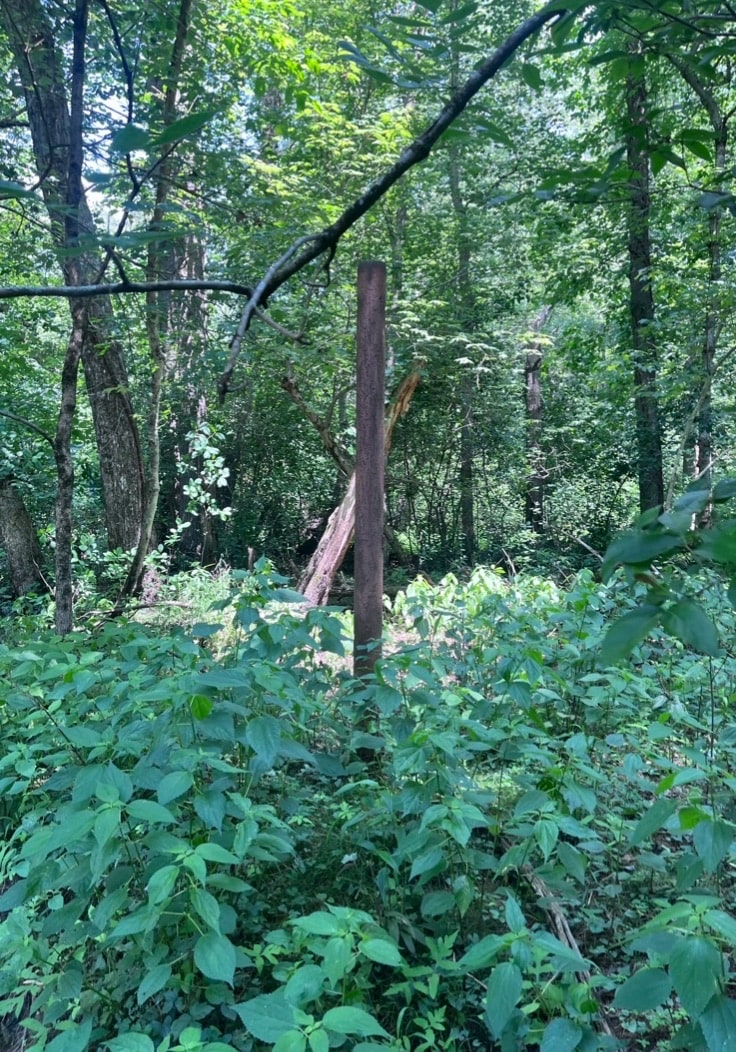

== See also ==
- List of Old Colony Railroad stations
