= Deerfield (CDP), Massachusetts =

Deerfield, Massachusetts
- Census-designated place
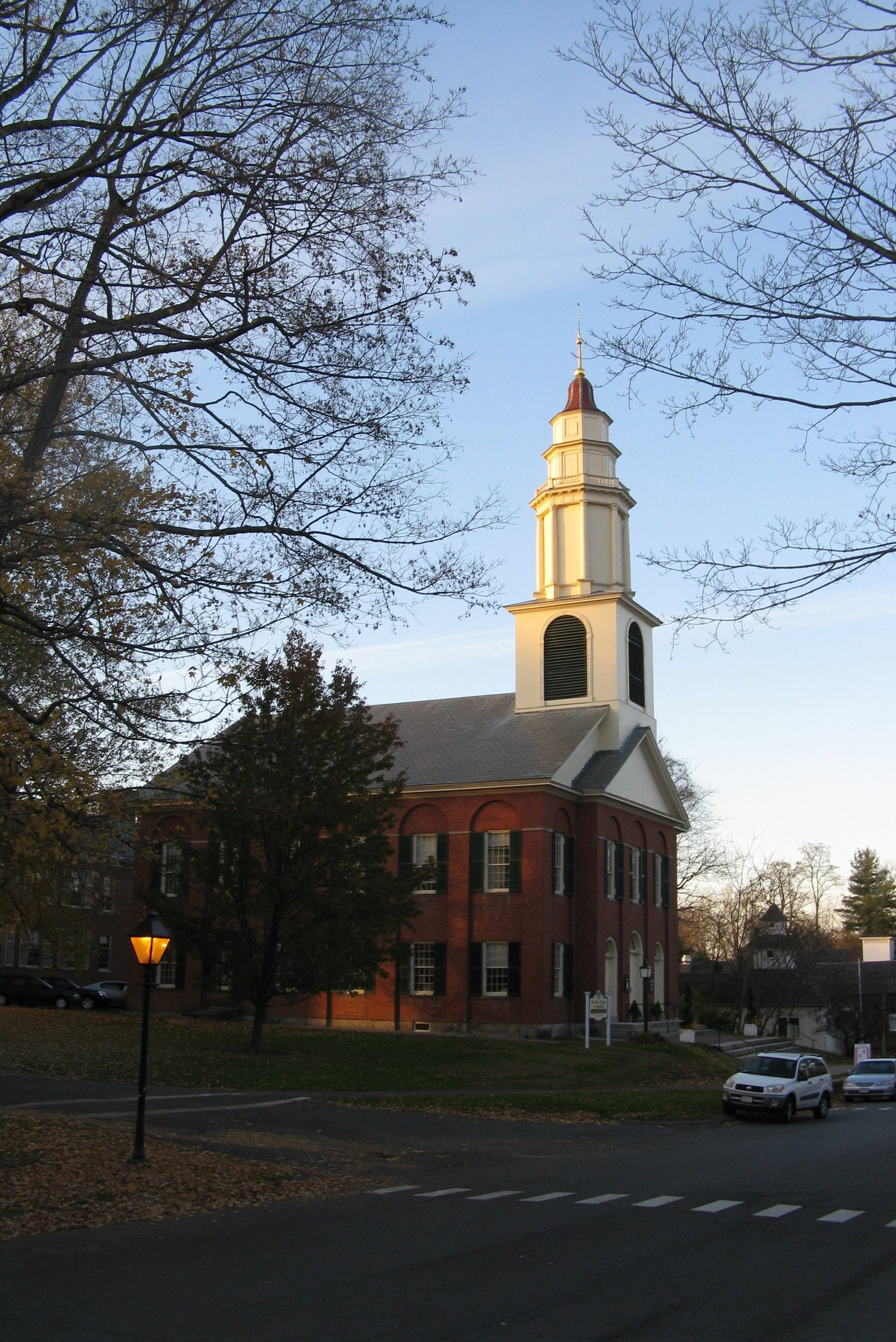
- The First Church of Deerfield

- Location in Franklin County in Massachusetts
- Coordinates: 42°32′40″N 72°36′20″W
- Country: United States
- State: Massachusetts
- County: Franklin
- Town: Deerfield

Area
  - Total: 1.87 sq mi (4.84 km^{2})
  - Land: 1.84 sq mi (4.76 km^{2})
  - Water: 0.031 sq mi (0.08 km^{2})
- Elevation: 164 ft (50 m)

Population (2020)
  - Total: 479
  - Density: 260.8/sq mi (100.69/km^{2})
- Time zone: UTC-5 (Eastern (EST))
  - Summer (DST): UTC-4 (EDT)
- ZIP codes: 01342
- Area code: 413
- FIPS code: 25-16635
- GNIS feature ID: 0608850

Deerfield is a census-designated place (CDP) in the town of Deerfield in Franklin County, Massachusetts, United States. The population was 643 at the 2010 census. It corresponds roughly to the area of Historic Deerfield, a historic district comprising the original town center of Deerfield. It is the home of Deerfield Academy, a college-preparatory school.

== Geography ==
According to the United States Census Bureau, the CDP has a total area of 1.87 square miles (4.84 km^{2}), of which 1.84 square miles (4.76 km^{2}) is land and 0.031 square miles (0.08 km^{2}), or 1.71%, is water.

== Demographics ==
US Census population 2016 = 479
