= Whitewash Village, Massachusetts =

Village in Massachusetts, United States

Coordinates: 41°33′33.5″N 69°59′37.1″W

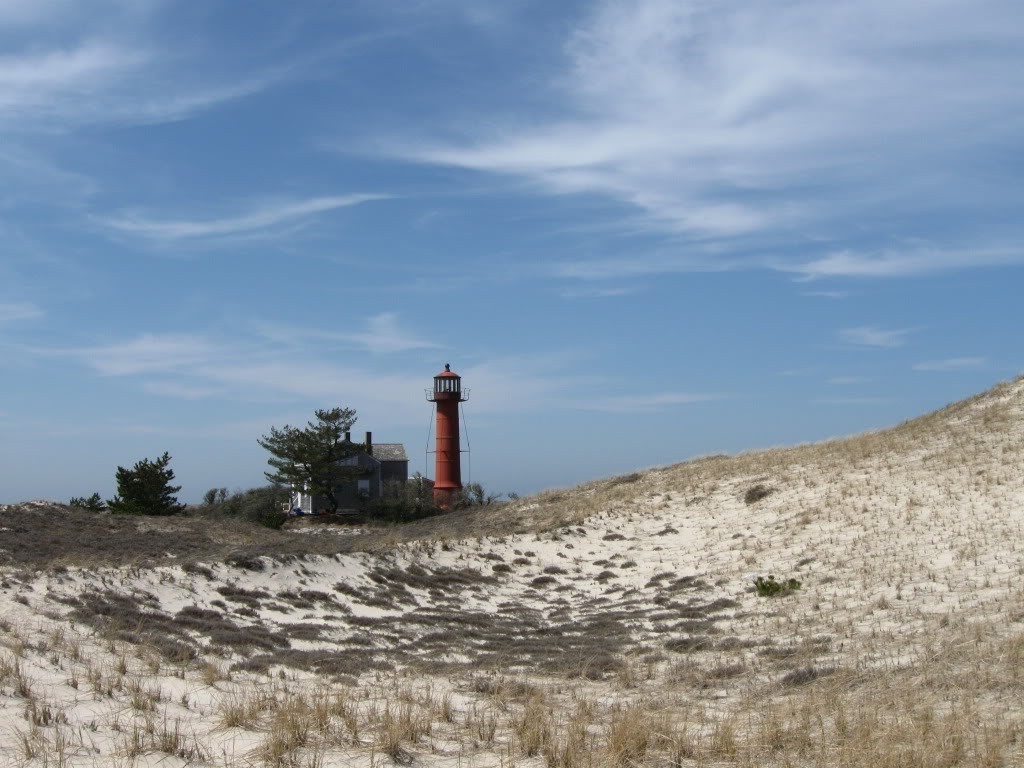
Monomoy Point Light in 2010

Whitewash Village was a village settlement on Monomoy Island in Massachusetts, established sometime around 1710. The village may have received its name from the whitewashed painted buildings, although whether this is true is unclear. There was a belief that the settlement contained vestiges of a strong economic framework. This had lasted for many years, and had been "bestowed upon it” by God. A tavern for rowdy sailors was opened up in the location of today's Hospital Pond, known then as Wreck Cove and also reputed to have housed prostitutes for passing sailors. There are legends of hauntings by prostitutes plying their wares with varying degrees of success.

During the early 19th century, a very deep natural harbor at Monomoy's inner shore known as the Powder Hole attracted a sizable fishing settlement. At its height almost 200 ships were in port here. In its prime, Whitewash Village housed about 200 residents, a tavern inn called Monomoit House, and Public School #13, which boasted 16 students at one time. Cod, lobsters and mackerel brought in to the Monomoy port were dried and packed for markets in Boston and New York. Lobsters were plentiful, and Cod was plentiful and they did provide both food and income for the villagers. These villagers peddled them to mainlanders at about two cents apiece. There were residents of the village known as "wreckers” or “knackers” because they would oftentimes pray for, and sometimes even cause shipwrecks, which they would subsequently strip of any valuable items.

The village was abandoned after its harbor was cut off by sand from a hurricane around 1860. Monomoy Island, on which the village was located, has an ever-changing geography, with many storms in the past disconnecting and reconnecting the island to the mainland. As of today, the only reminders that Monomoy Island was once inhabited are some fragments of the wood from shacks sticking up through the sands at low tide, and some brick foundations - and the Monomoy Point Light. Locals know the portion of the now underwater ruins of the former village is considered to be an excellent fishing spot.

== See also ==
- Cape Cod
- Chatham, Massachusetts
