= Questing (New Marlborough, Massachusetts) =

Massachusetts open space preserve

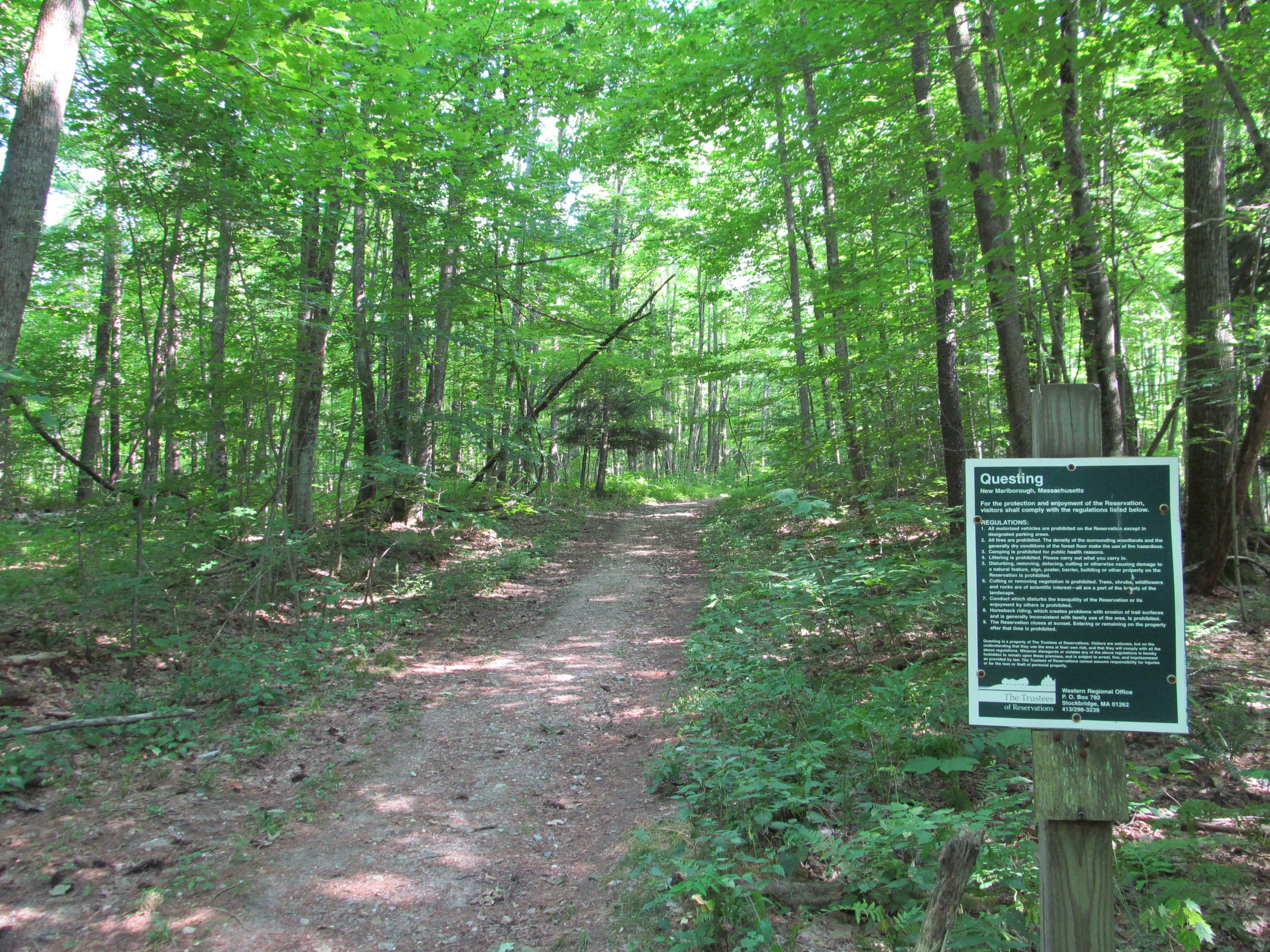
- Questing

- Location within Massachusetts
- Location: Massachusetts, United States
- Coordinates: 42.1219°N 73.2518°W
- Area: 438 sq mi (1,130 km^{2})
- Established: 1996
- Operator: The Trustees of Reservations
- Website: Questing

Questing is a 438-acre (177 ha) open space preserve and colonial era historic site located in New Marlborough, Massachusetts within The Berkshires. The property, acquired in 1996 by the land conservation non-profit organization The Trustees of Reservations, is named for a mythical beast from Arthurian Mythology called the Questing Beast.

The reservation includes hiking trails, open meadows and hay fields, vernal pools, and streams. It is open to hiking, picnicking, cross country skiing, and hunting (in season). A trailhead is located on New Marlborough Hill Road in New Marlborough. Bikes, snowmobiles and motorized vehicles are prohibited.

== History ==
Questing Reservation is on a hill where the first fort was built in the original New Marlborough settlement, and where the first non-Native American children were born, the Brookins twins. The precise location of this site is no longer known. Later this site was also the location of the settlement of the Leffingwell family, abandoned in the Great Depression. The only remains of the Leffingwell farmstead are cellar holes and stone walls.

The property was acquired in 1992 and 1996 through land gifts by Robert A. Lehman and Richard W. Sellew.
