= Zoar, Massachusetts =

Village in Massachusetts, United States

Coordinates: 42°39′09″N 72°55′53″W

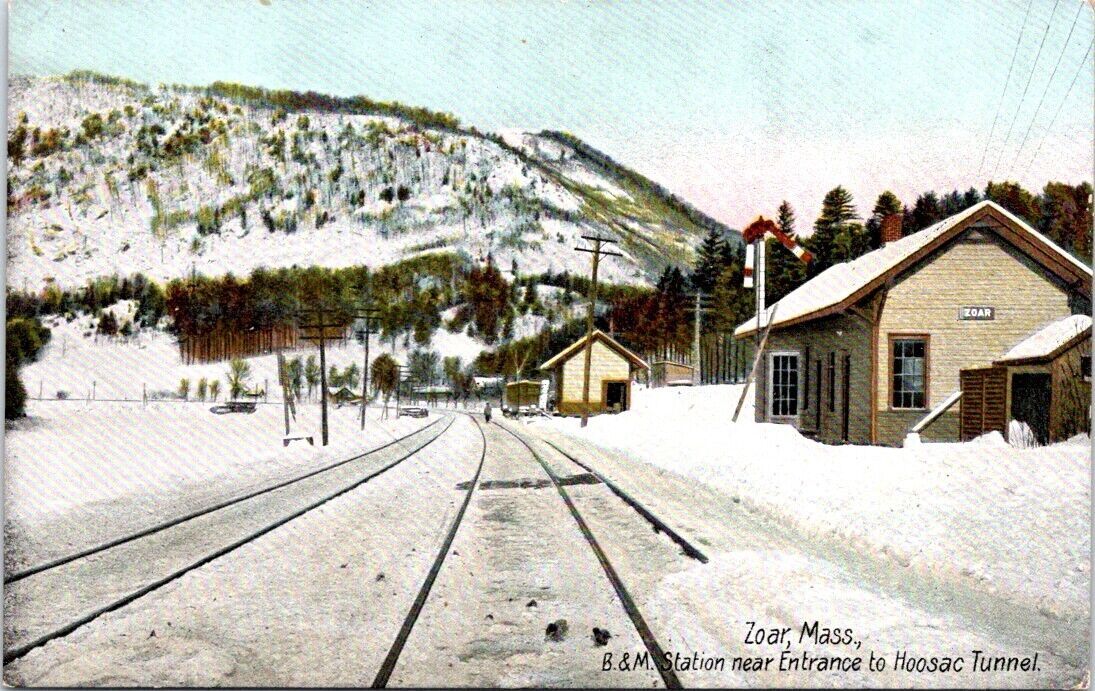
B&M Railroad Station in 1908

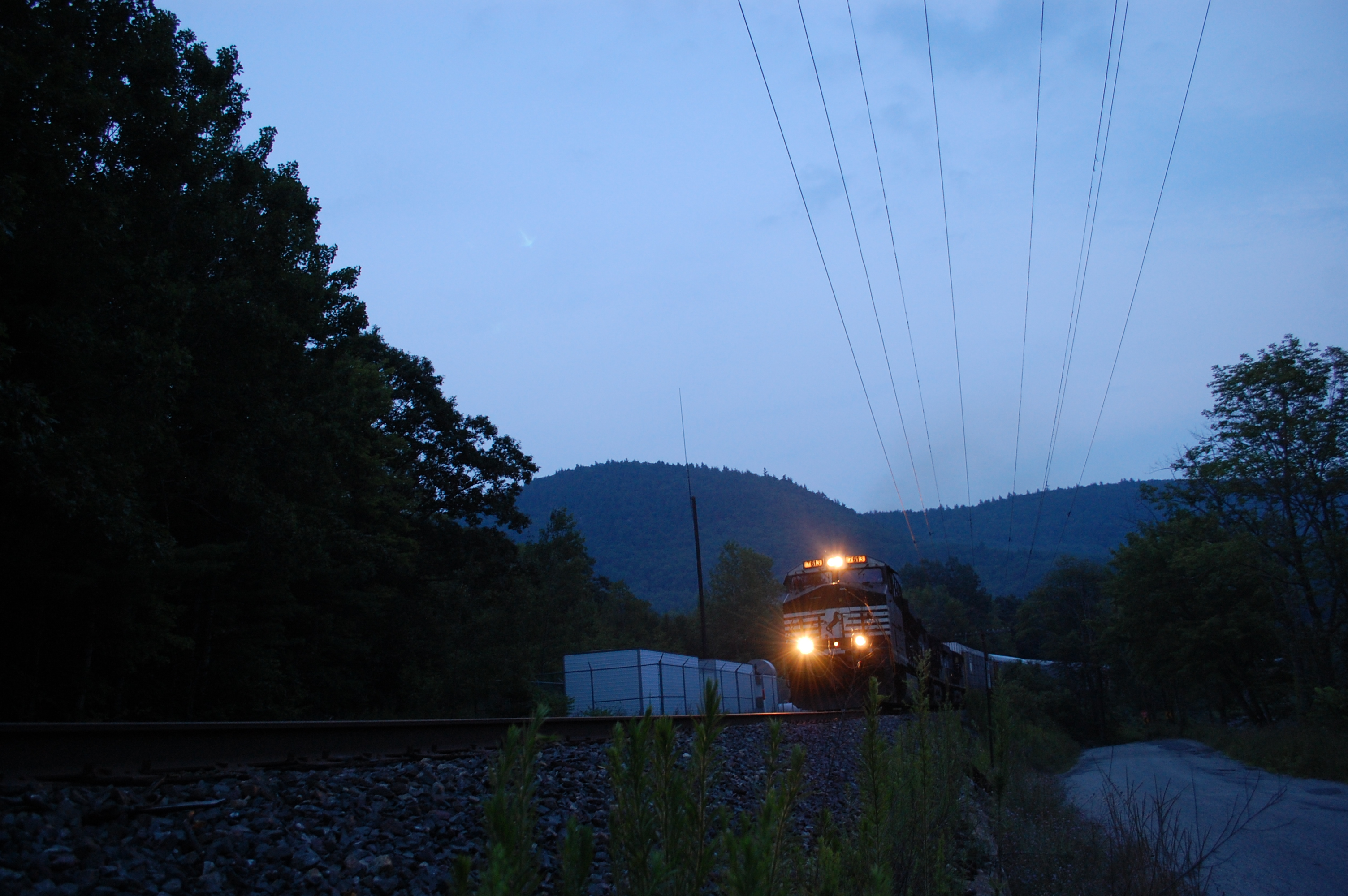
Norfolk Southern Eng. 7613 operating westbound on Pam Am Southern (formerly Guilford) trackage in Zoar, Massachusetts near Hoosac Tunnel

Zoar is a village within the town of Charlemont in Franklin County, Massachusetts, United States, on the east bank of the Deerfield River.

The town is part of a popular recreation area for white water rafters and railroad enthusiasts. It was once served by the Hoosac Tunnel rail line of the Boston & Maine Railroad. No trains stop at Zoar in modern times. The station was torn down in 1954. The rail line continues to be active as freight only, operated by Pan Am Railways.
