= Franklin County, Massachusetts =

County in Massachusetts, United States

- County
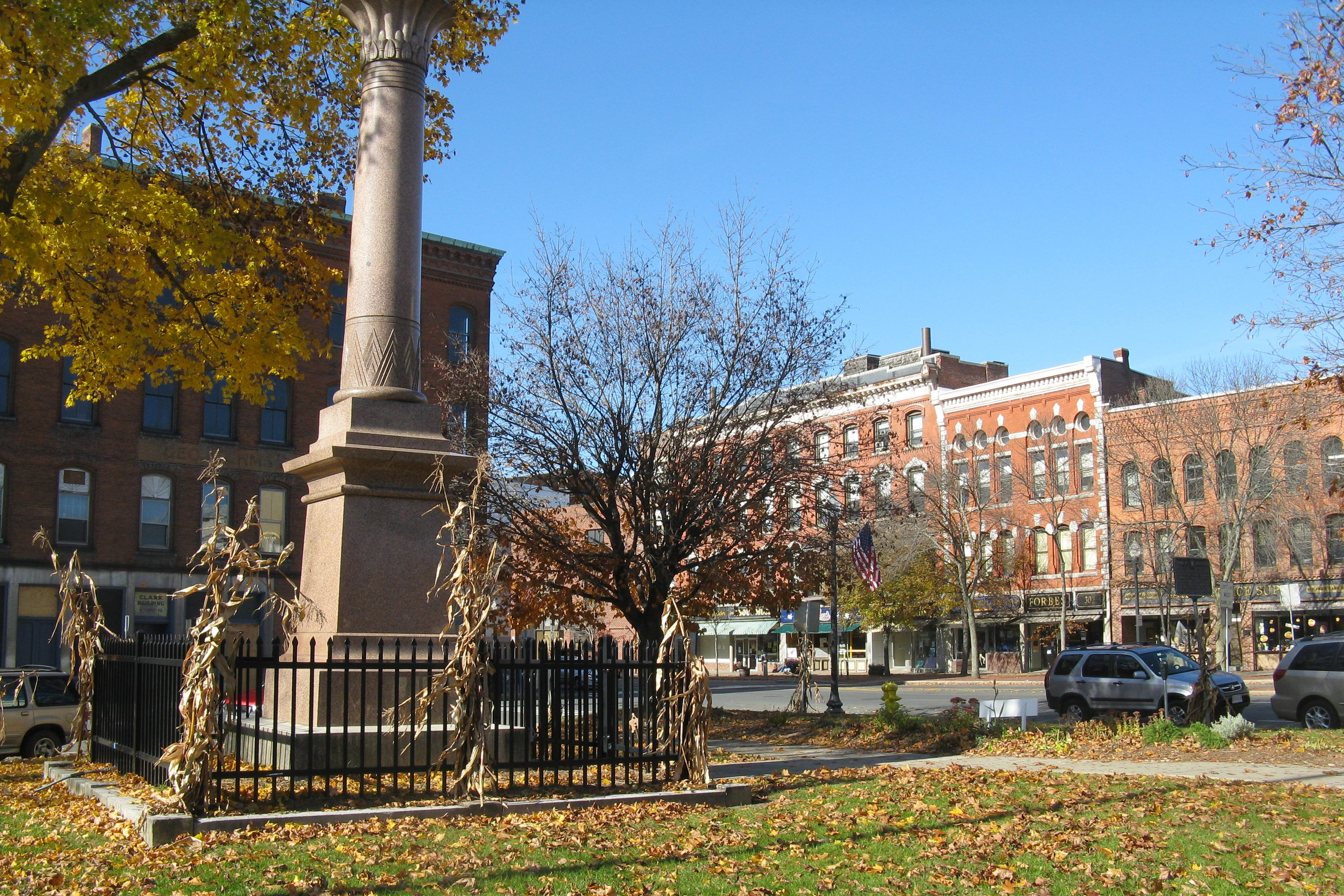
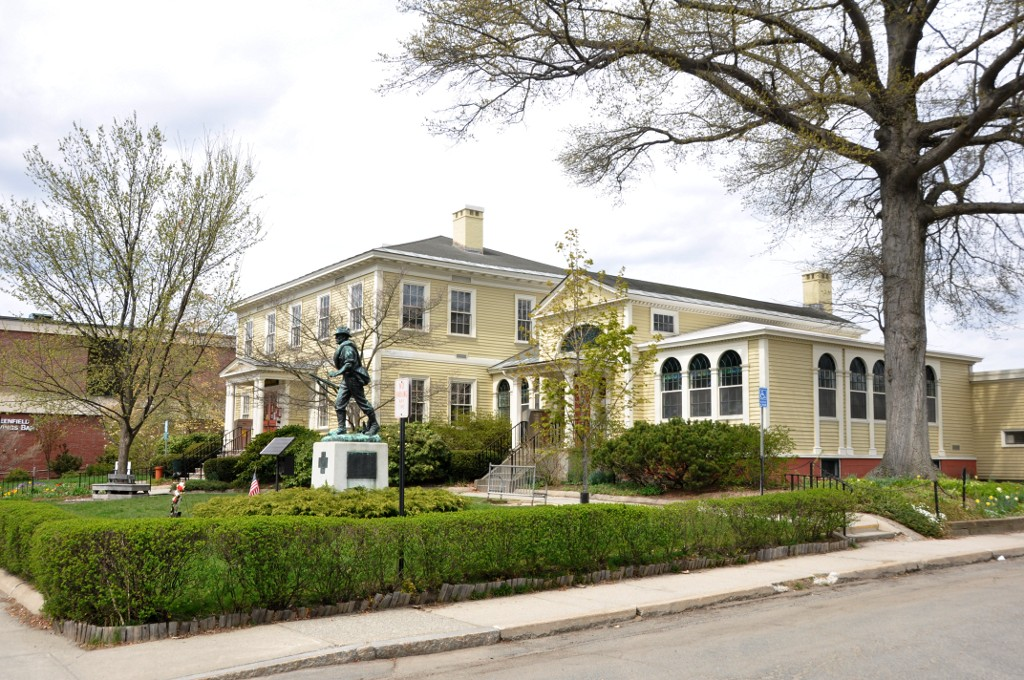
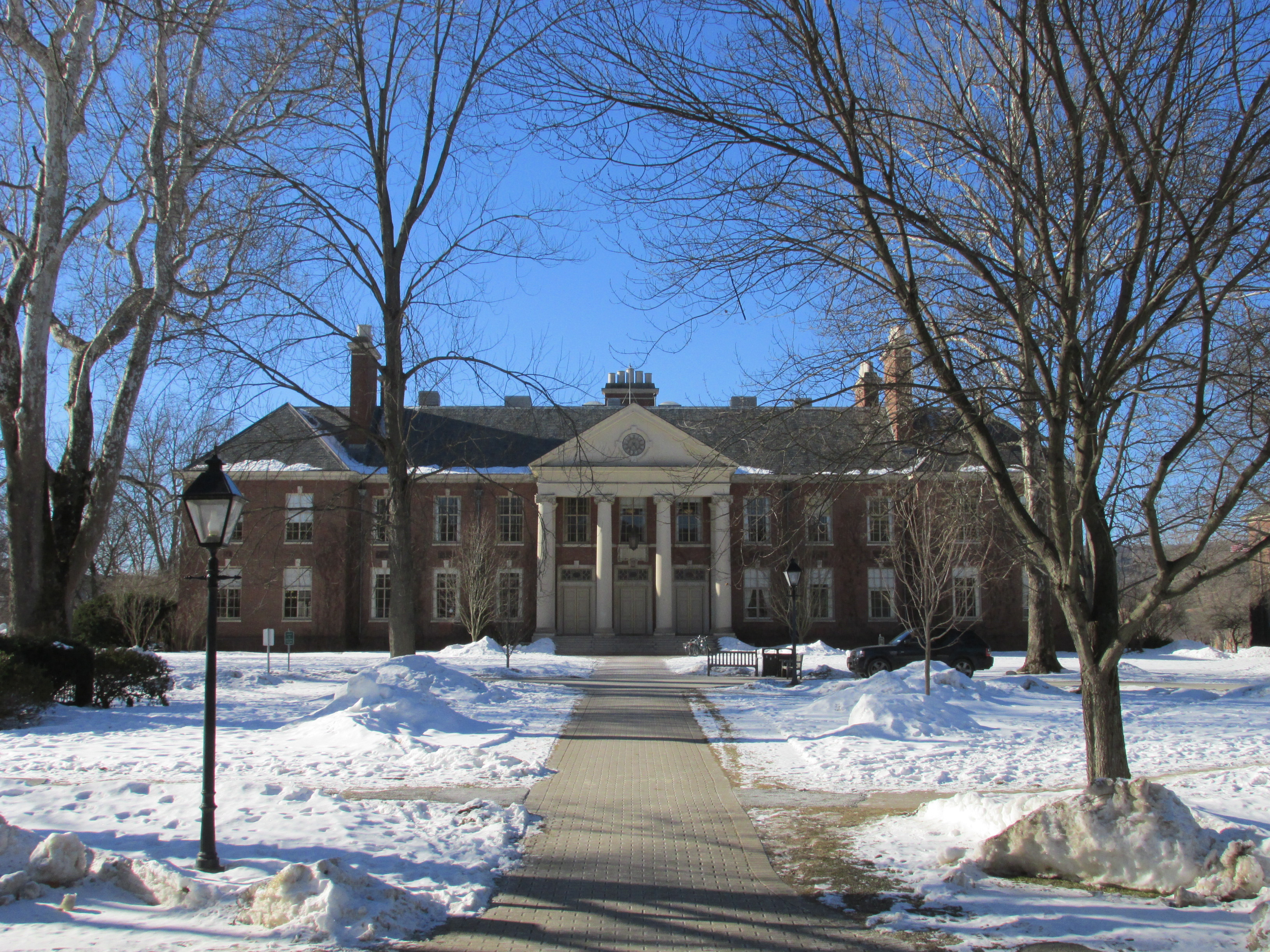
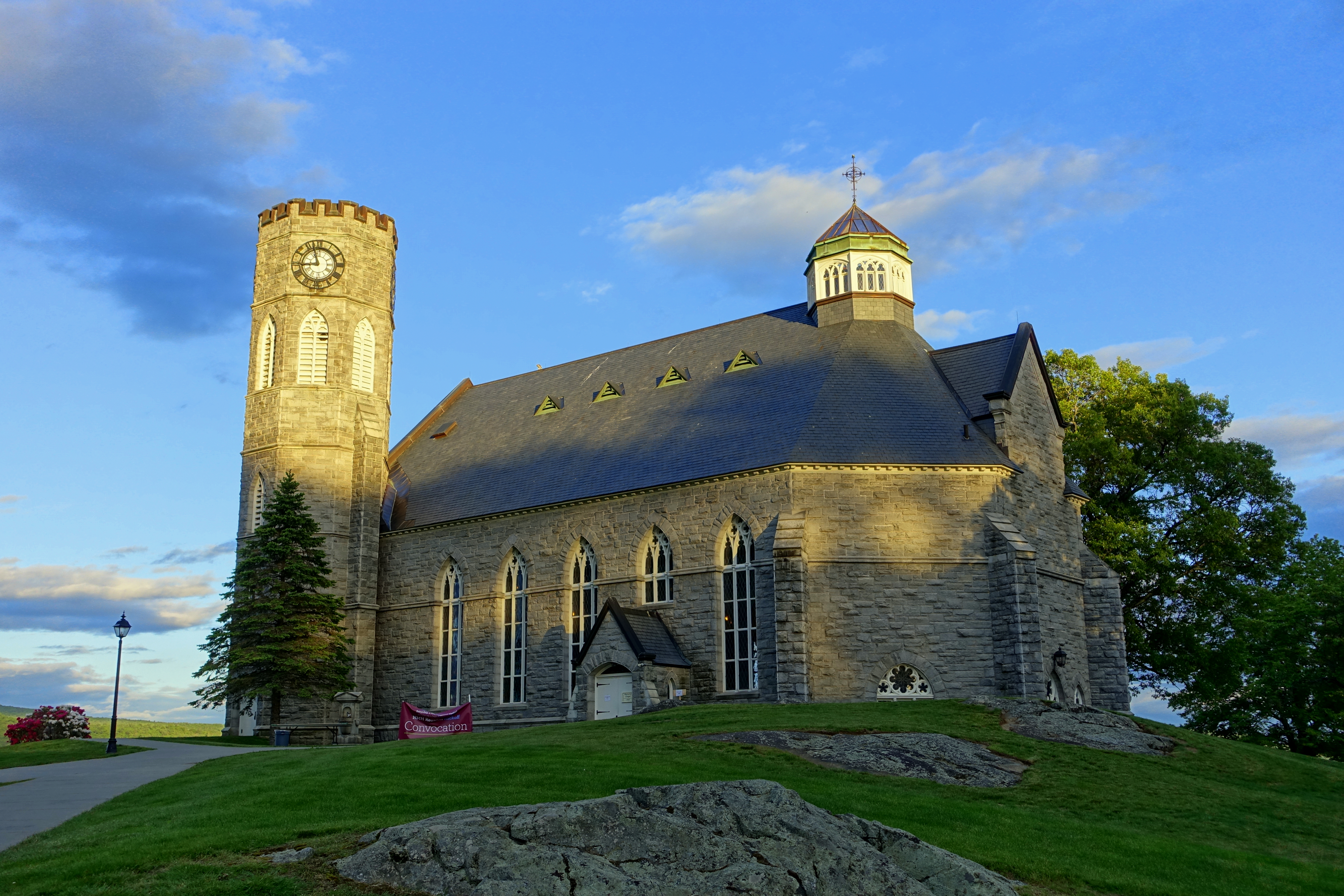
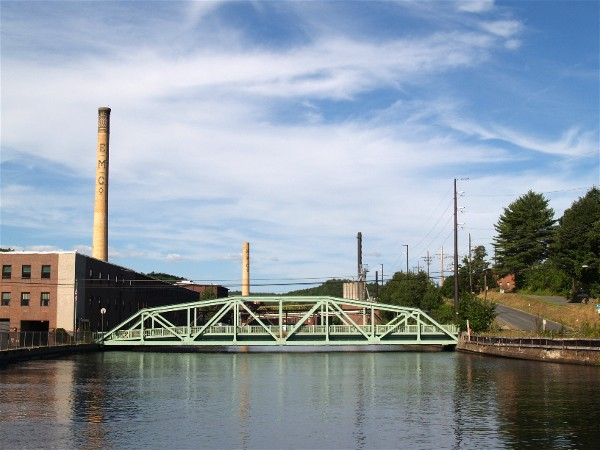
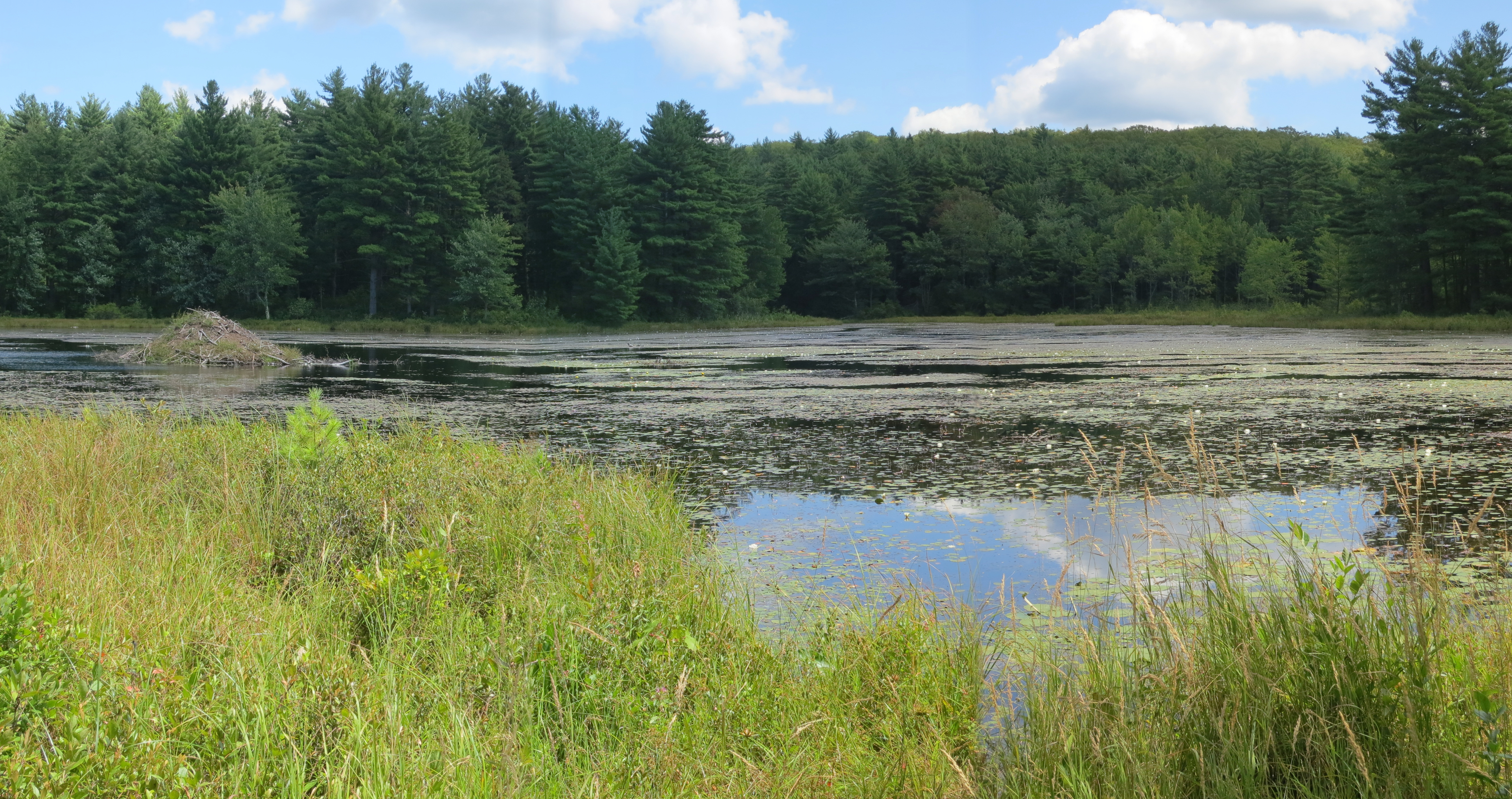
- Greenfield Leavitt-Hovey House Deerfield Academy Northfield Mount Hermon School Turners Falls Wendell State Forest

- Seal

- Location within the U.S. state of Massachusetts
- Coordinates: 42°35′13″N 72°34′26″W
- Country: United States
- State: Massachusetts
- Founded: 1811
- Named for: Benjamin Franklin
- Seat: Greenfield
- Largest city: Greenfield

Area
  - Total: 725 sq mi (1,880 km^{2})
  - Land: 699 sq mi (1,810 km^{2})
  - Water: 25 sq mi (65 km^{2}) 3.5%

Population (2020)
  - Total: 71,029
  - Estimate (2025): 70,698 ▼
  - Density: 102/sq mi (39.2/km^{2})
- Time zone: UTC−5 (Eastern)
  - Summer (DST): UTC−4 (EDT)
- Congressional districts: 1st, 2nd

Franklin County is a nongovernmental county in the northwestern part of the U.S. state of Massachusetts. At the 2020 census, the population was 71,029, which made it the least populous county on the Massachusetts mainland, and the third least populous county in the state. Its traditional county seat and most populous city is Greenfield. Its largest town by area is New Salem. Franklin County comprises the Greenfield Town, MA Micropolitan Statistical Area, which is included in the Springfield–Greenfield Town, MA Combined Statistical Area.

== History ==
Franklin County was created on June 24, 1811, from the northern third of Hampshire County. It was named for Benjamin Franklin. Franklin County's government was abolished by the state government in 1997, at the county's request.

== Law and government ==
Like several other Massachusetts counties, Franklin County exists today only as a geographic region and has no county government. The Franklin County Commission voted itself out of existence, and all former state-mandated county functions were assumed by state agencies in 1997. The sheriff and some other regional officials with specific duties are still elected locally to perform duties within the county region. Counties in Massachusetts and New England generally are historically weak governmental structures. The primary subdivision of the Commonwealth is the municipal town. Communities are permitted to form regional compacts for sharing services. The municipalities of Franklin County have formed the Franklin Regional Council of Governments. The regional council provides various services on a regional basis, and a majority of the county's towns are members of the Franklin County Solid Waste Management District, which provides municipal waste disposal and recycling services to its members. Public transportation throughout the county and in the North Quabbin area of northwestern Worcester County is provided by the Franklin Regional Transit Authority.

== Politics ==
United States presidential election results for Franklin County, Massachusetts
Year	Republican / Whig		Democratic		Third party(ies)	
Year	No.	%	No.	%	No.	%
1836	2,405	69.59%	1,051	30.41%	0	0.00%
1840	3,461	61.20%	2,137	37.79%	57	1.01%
1844	2,725	52.45%	2,047	39.40%	423	8.14%
1848	2,133	40.09%	1,542	28.98%	1,645	30.92%
1852	2,552	46.42%	1,727	31.41%	1,219	22.17%
1856	4,445	74.44%	1,266	21.20%	260	4.35%
1860	3,994	74.28%	917	17.05%	466	8.67%
1864	4,376	77.25%	1,289	22.75%	0	0.00%
1868	4,580	83.33%	916	16.67%	0	0.00%
1872	4,335	80.80%	1,030	19.20%	0	0.00%
1876	4,072	64.14%	2,257	35.55%	20	0.32%
1880	4,022	64.37%	2,098	33.58%	128	2.05%
1884	3,676	53.34%	2,577	37.39%	639	9.27%
1888	4,100	55.90%	2,852	38.88%	383	5.22%
1892	4,510	58.50%	2,886	37.44%	313	4.06%
1896	5,671	78.46%	1,110	15.36%	447	6.18%
1900	4,937	70.47%	1,874	26.75%	195	2.78%
1904	5,034	71.40%	1,672	23.72%	344	4.88%
1908	4,824	67.87%	1,637	23.03%	647	9.10%
1912	2,636	36.08%	2,046	28.00%	2,624	35.92%
1916	4,353	56.93%	3,054	39.94%	239	3.13%
1920	9,931	77.85%	2,542	19.93%	284	2.23%
1924	11,350	77.12%	2,089	14.19%	1,278	8.68%
1928	14,333	70.52%	5,842	28.74%	149	0.73%
1932	13,040	66.03%	6,248	31.64%	460	2.33%
1936	13,756	57.99%	9,324	39.31%	641	2.70%
1940	14,137	59.58%	9,472	39.92%	119	0.50%
1944	13,252	58.37%	9,400	41.40%	51	0.22%
1948	14,919	61.21%	9,231	37.87%	223	0.91%
1952	19,489	68.94%	8,729	30.88%	50	0.18%
1956	19,779	72.09%	7,574	27.61%	83	0.30%
1960	15,682	55.99%	12,282	43.85%	47	0.17%
1964	8,344	32.56%	17,106	66.76%	174	0.68%
1968	12,345	48.63%	12,072	47.55%	969	3.82%
1972	16,088	56.92%	11,968	42.35%	207	0.73%
1976	14,837	47.58%	14,985	48.06%	1,359	4.36%
1980	12,528	41.59%	11,830	39.27%	5,764	19.14%
1984	15,883	50.37%	15,502	49.16%	148	0.47%
1988	13,475	40.68%	19,310	58.30%	338	1.02%
1992	8,691	24.26%	17,246	48.14%	9,890	27.60%
1996	8,055	24.60%	19,728	60.25%	4,959	15.15%
2000	10,176	30.50%	17,945	53.78%	5,245	15.72%
2004	11,058	29.58%	25,550	68.35%	773	2.07%
2008	9,545	24.77%	27,919	72.46%	1,065	2.76%
2012	9,344	24.75%	27,072	71.70%	1,342	3.55%
2016	10,364	26.70%	24,478	63.05%	3,979	10.25%
2020	11,201	26.38%	30,030	70.73%	1,227	2.89%
2024	12,428	29.42%	28,305	67.00%	1,515	3.59%

=== Voter registration ===
Voter registration and party enrollment as of February 2024
Unenrolled	37,116	66.01%
Democratic	14,576	25.92%
Republican	3,871	6.88%
Libertarian	192	0.34%
Other parties	473	0.84%
Total	56,228	100%

== Geography and climate ==
According to the U.S. Census Bureau, the county has a total area of 724.57 square miles (1,876.6 km^{2}), of which 699 square miles (1,810 km^{2}) is land, 25 square miles (65 km^{2}) and (3.5%) is water. Central and southern Franklin County is dominated by the northern end of the Pioneer Valley, with steep hills rising on either side of the Connecticut River.

The high point of Franklin County is Crum Hill, 2,841 feet (866 m), located in the town of Monroe.

=== Climate ===
The climate in Franklin County is typically cool temperate. The area is also somewhat maritime, with relatively high year-round precipitation. Summers are warm and humid with frequent evening storms, and winters are cool to cold with frequent snow and subfreezing (below 31 °F) temperatures.

=== Protected areas ===
- Silvio O. Conte National Fish and Wildlife Refuge (part)
- Paul C. Jones Working Forest (privately owned with conservation easement) around Brushy Mountain, Shutesbury

Various Department of Conservation & Recreation properties.

== Demographics ==
Historical population
Census	Pop.	Note	%±
1820	29,268		—
1830	29,501		0.8%
1840	28,812		−2.3%
1850	30,870		7.1%
1860	31,434		1.8%
1870	32,635		3.8%
1880	36,001		10.3%
1890	38,610		7.2%
1900	41,209		6.7%
1910	43,600		5.8%
1920	49,361		13.2%
1930	49,612		0.5%
1940	49,453		−0.3%
1950	52,747		6.7%
1960	54,864		4.0%
1970	59,210		7.9%
1980	64,317		8.6%
1990	70,092		9.0%
2000	71,535		2.1%
2010	71,372		−0.2%
2020	71,029		−0.5%
2025 (est.)	70,698	▼	−0.5%
U.S. Decennial Census; 1790–1960 1900–1990; 1990–2000 2010–2018

=== 2020 census ===
As of the 2020 census, the county had a population of 71,029. Of the residents, 17.2% were under the age of 18 and 23.4% were 65 years of age or older; the median age was 47.0 years. For every 100 females there were 96.0 males, and for every 100 females age 18 and over there were 93.8 males. 45.1% of residents lived in urban areas and 54.9% lived in rural areas.

The racial makeup of the county was 87.8% White, 1.5% Black or African American, 0.3% American Indian and Alaska Native, 1.7% Asian, 0.0% Native Hawaiian and Pacific Islander, 1.9% from some other race, and 6.8% from two or more races. Hispanic or Latino residents of any race comprised 5.1% of the population.

There were 31,323 households in the county, of which 22.6% had children under the age of 18 living with them and 28.6% had a female householder with no spouse or partner present. About 32.9% of all households were made up of individuals and 15.3% had someone living alone who was 65 years of age or older.

There were 34,345 housing units, of which 8.8% were vacant. Among occupied housing units, 68.0% were owner-occupied and 32.0% were renter-occupied. The homeowner vacancy rate was 1.1% and the rental vacancy rate was 4.3%.

=== Racial and ethnic composition ===
Franklin County, Massachusetts – Racial and ethnic composition Note: the US Census treats Hispanic/Latino as an ethnic category. This table excludes Latinos from the racial categories and assigns them to a separate category. Hispanics/Latinos may be of any race.
Race / Ethnicity (NH = Non-Hispanic)	Pop 1980	Pop 1990	Pop 2000	Pop 2010	Pop 2020	% 1980	% 1990	% 2000	% 2010	% 2020
White alone (NH)	63,319	68,074	67,518	65,978	61,464	98.45%	97.12%	94.38%	92.44%	86.53%
Black or African American alone (NH)	280	457	594	703	963	0.44%	0.65%	0.83%	0.98%	1.36%
Native American or Alaska Native alone (NH)	81	195	178	175	121	0.13%	0.28%	0.25%	0.25%	0.17%
Asian alone (NH)	204	476	734	887	1,186	0.32%	0.68%	1.03%	1.24%	1.67%
Native Hawaiian or Pacific Islander alone (NH)	x	x	15	9	10	x	x	0.02%	0.01%	0.01%
Other race alone (NH)	122	48	105	99	362	0.19%	0.07%	0.15%	0.14%	0.51%
Mixed race or Multiracial (NH)	x	x	966	1,271	3,331	x	x	1.35%	1.78%	4.69%
Hispanic or Latino (any race)	311	842	1,425	2,250	3,592	0.48%	1.20%	1.99%	3.15%	5.06%
Total	64,317	70,092	71,535	71,372	71,029	100.00%	100.00%	100.00%	100.00%	100.00%

=== 2010 census ===
At the 2010 census, there were 71,372 people, 30,462 households, and 18,317 families in the county. The population density was 102.1 inhabitants per square mile (39.4/km^{2}). There were 33,758 housing units at an average density of 48.3 per square mile (18.6/km^{2}). The racial makeup of the county was 94.2% white, 1.3% Asian, 1.1% black, 0.3% American Indian, 1.0% from other races, and 2.1% from two or more races. Those of Hispanic or Latino origin made up 3.2% of the population. The largest ancestry groups were:

- 20.0% English
- 19.8% Irish
- 15.9% French
- 12.6% Polish
- 12.0% German
- 9.1% Italian
- 7.2% French Canadian
- 4.5% Scottish
- 3.9% American
- 2.1% Swedish
- 2.0% Scotch-Irish
- 1.8% Puerto Rican
- 1.5% Russian
- 1.3% Dutch
- 1.3% Portuguese
- 1.3% Lithuanian
- 1.0% Welsh

Of the 30,462 households, 26.4% had children under the age of 18 living with them, 44.8% were married couples living together, 10.7% had a female householder with no husband present, 39.9% were non-families, and 30.5% of households were made up of individuals. The average household size was 2.29 and the average family size was 2.85. The median age was 44.2 years.

The median household income was $52,002 and the median family income was $65,760. Males had a median income of $45,480 versus $37,309 for females. The per capita income for the county was $27,544. About 7.7% of families and 11.3% of the population were below the poverty line, including 14.8% of those under age 18 and 7.5% of those age 65 or over.

=== 2000 census ===
At the 2000 census there were 71,535 people, 29,466 households, and 18,416 families in the county. The population density was 102 inhabitants per square mile (39/km^{2}). There were 31,939 housing units at an average density of 46 per square mile (18/km^{2}). The racial makeup of the county was 95.40% White, 0.89% Black or African American, 0.29% Native American, 1.04% Asian, 0.03% Pacific Islander, 0.75% from other races, and 1.61% from two or more races. 1.99%. were Hispanic or Latino of any race. 16.2% were of English, 12.2% Irish, 12.0% Polish, 10.2% French, 7.0% French Canadian, 6.7% German, 6.1% Italian and 6.0% American ancestry according to Census 2000. Most of those claiming to be of "American" ancestry are actually of English descent, but have family that has been in the country for so long, in many cases since the early seventeenth century that they choose to identify simply as "American". 94.5% spoke English and 1.8% Spanish as their first language.

Of the 29,466 households 29.5% had children under the age of 18 living with them, 47.9% were married couples living together, 10.6% had a female householder with no husband present, and 37.5% were non-families. 29.0% of households were one person and 10.9% were one person aged 65 or older. The average household size was 2.38 and the average family size was 2.95.

The age distribution was 23.5% under the age of 18, 7.8% from 18 to 24, 28.5% from 25 to 44, 25.9% from 45 to 64, and 14.2% 65 or older. The median age was 40 years. For every 100 females, there were 93.8 males. For every 100 females age 18 and over, there were 90.5 males.

The median household income was $40,768 and the median family income was $50,915. Males had a median income of $36,350 versus $27,228 for females. The per capita income for the county was $20,672. About 6.5% of families and 9.4% of the population were below the poverty line, including 10.5% of those under age 18 and 8.8% of those age 65 or over.

=== Demographic breakdown by town ===
==== Income ====
The ranking of unincorporated communities that are included on the list are reflective if the census designated locations and villages were included as cities or towns. Data is from the 2007-2011 American Community Survey 5-Year Estimates.

Rank	Town		Per capita income	Median household income	Median family income	Population	Number of households
	Deerfield	CDP	$39,291	$90,625	$91,786	252	83
1	Hawley	Town	$37,094	$63,750	$79,167	378	154
2	Leverett	Town	$36,750	$74,500	$87,188	1,756	702
3	Shutesbury	Town	$36,472	$67,708	$85,972	1,834	745
	Massachusetts	State	$35,051	$65,981	$83,371	6,512,227	2,522,409
4	Whately	Town	$34,183	$78,750	$89,500	1,529	629
	Northfield	CDP	$33,956	$67,900	$88,068	1,004	440
5	New Salem	Town	$33,776	$64,833	$72,083	953	402
6	Ashfield	Town	$33,569	$66,429	$69,375	1,771	742
7	Conway	Town	$33,385	$80,313	$85,000	1,793	705
8	Deerfield	Town	$33,111	$69,744	$85,231	5,096	2,145
9	Leyden	Town	$32,348	$72,500	$78,167	633	272
	South Deerfield	CDP	$31,773	$51,107	$80,147	1,926	931
10	Gill	Town	$31,288	$59,800	$70,833	1,428	566
11	Sunderland	Town	$31,090	$54,208	$73,403	3,696	1,525
12	Northfield	Town	$31,001	$61,667	$73,697	3,034	1,276
13	Shelburne	Town	$30,751	$59,145	$77,063	1,957	811
14	Heath	Town	$30,557	$63,333	$72,981	483	214
15	Warwick	Town	$29,135	$59,531	$67,500	601	269
16	Colrain	Town	$29,035	$53,813	$64,375	1,729	703
17	Charlemont	Town	$28,555	$53,281	$64,000	1,160	505
18	Wendell	Town	$28,480	$56,750	$62,143	1,076	452
19	Rowe	Town	$28,354	$50,938	$56,667	386	183
	Franklin County	County	$28,313	$52,246	$65,713	71,495	30,362
20	Bernardston	Town	$28,117	$50,556	$66,000	2,193	948
	United States	Country	$27,915	$52,762	$64,293	306,603,772	114,761,359
21	Buckland	Town	$27,308	$61,750	$73,125	2,297	869
	Shelburne Falls	CDP	$27,155	$49,635	$62,500	1,886	815
22	Greenfield	City	$26,229	$46,018	$56,063	17,565	7,717
23	Montague	Town	$24,823	$41,980	$57,234	8,455	3,733
24	Erving	Town	$23,775	$53,661	$57,692	1,755	689
	Orange	CDP	$22,652	$50,407	$51,979	3,926	1,534
25	Monroe	Town	$22,647	$30,714	$56,875	122	72
	Turners Falls	CDP	$22,590	$36,623	$48,796	4,620	2,039
26	Orange	Town	$22,434	$44,282	$50,536	7,815	3,334
	Millers Falls	CDP	$21,386	$50,550	$58,516	1,129	443

== Transportation ==
Franklin County is served by buses run by the Franklin Regional Transit Authority. Southeastern Franklin County is also served by the Pioneer Valley Transit Authority, with transportation to destinations in neighboring Hampshire County.

=== Highways ===
Franklin County is served by one Interstate Highway, Interstate 91, which runs north–south through the central part of the county along the Connecticut River valley from Whately to Bernardston. Two U.S. Routes also pass through the county: U.S. Route 5 parallels I-91 along the river, while U.S. Route 202 crosses the eastern portion through New Salem and Orange.

The primary east–west artery across the county is Massachusetts Route 2, part of the historic Mohawk Trail, which connects Charlemont, Shelburne, Greenfield, Erving, and Orange, alongside its alternate alignment, Massachusetts Route 2A. Other north–south state routes serving the county include Massachusetts Route 8A, Massachusetts Route 10, Massachusetts Route 47, Massachusetts Route 63, Massachusetts Route 78, Massachusetts Route 112, and Massachusetts Route 122, while Massachusetts Route 116 traverses the southwestern towns of Ashfield, Conway, Deerfield, and Sunderland.

== Notable person ==
- David Dunnels White, Medal of Honor nominee for capturing Major General Custis Lee, son of Robert E. Lee, at the Battle of Sailor's Creek, Virginia, April 6, 1865. He was born in Cheshire, Massachusetts, in 1844, and was buried in the Bozrah Cemetery in East Hawley, Massachusetts, in 1924.

== Communities ==
=== City ===
- Greenfield (traditional county seat)

=== Towns ===
- Ashfield
- Bernardston
- Buckland
- Charlemont
- Colrain
- Conway
- Deerfield
- Erving
- Gill
- Hawley
- Heath
- Leverett
- Leyden
- Monroe
- Montague
- New Salem
- Northfield
- Orange
- Rowe
- Shelburne
- Shutesbury
- Sunderland
- Warwick
- Wendell
- Whately

=== Census-designated places ===
- Deerfield
- Millers Falls
- Northfield
- Orange
- Shelburne Falls
- South Deerfield
- Turners Falls

=== Other unincorporated communities ===
- Lake Pleasant
- Satans Kingdom
- Zoar

== See also ==
- List of Massachusetts locations by per capita income
- Registry of Deeds (Massachusetts)
- National Register of Historic Places listings in Franklin County, Massachusetts
