= Massachusetts Route 66 =

State highway in Hampshire County, Massachusetts, US

Route 66
- Route 66 highlighted in red

Route information
- Maintained by MassDOT
- Length: 13.65 mi (21.97 km)

Major junctions
- West end: Route 112 in Huntington
- East end: Route 9 in Northampton

Location
- Country: United States
- State: Massachusetts
- Counties: Hampshire

Highway system
- Massachusetts State Highway System; Interstate; US; State
← Route 63	→ Route 67

Route 66 is a state highway in the U.S. state of Massachusetts. The highway runs 13.65 miles (21.97 km) from Route 112 in Huntington east to Route 9 in Northampton. Route 66 connects the western Hampshire County towns of Huntington, Westhampton, and Northampton and passes through Smith College at its eastern end.

== Route description ==
Route 66 begins at Route 112 (Worthington Road) next to the Eastern Branch of the Westfield River in the village of Knightville in the town of Huntington. The two-lane highway heads east as Pond Brook Road, which follows the namesake stream to the village of Norwich then ascends Norwich Hill. Route 66 continues through Westhampton along Main Road, which crosses the upper reaches of the Manhan River and descends to that river's North Branch at the village of Loudville at the Northampton city line. The highway continues into the city as Westhampton Road, but that name changes to Rocky Hill Road at Florence Road then Chapel Street and Prince Street before its final name of West Street. Route 66's West Street section passes by the site of the former Northampton State Hospital, crosses the Mill River, and passes through the campus of Smith College. At the east end of campus, the highway reaches its eastern terminus at Route 9—which heads west as Elm Street and east as Main Street—just west of Route 9's intersection with Route 10 (New Street) on the west side of downtown Northampton.

== Junction list ==
The entire route is in Hampshire County.

Location	mi	km	Destinations	Notes
Huntington	0.00	0.00	Route 112 to US 20 – Huntington, Worthington	Western terminus
Northampton	13.65	21.97	Route 9 (Main Street) – Northampton Station	Eastern terminus
1.000 mi = 1.609 km; 1.000 km = 0.621 mi
