= Littleville Lake (Massachusetts) =

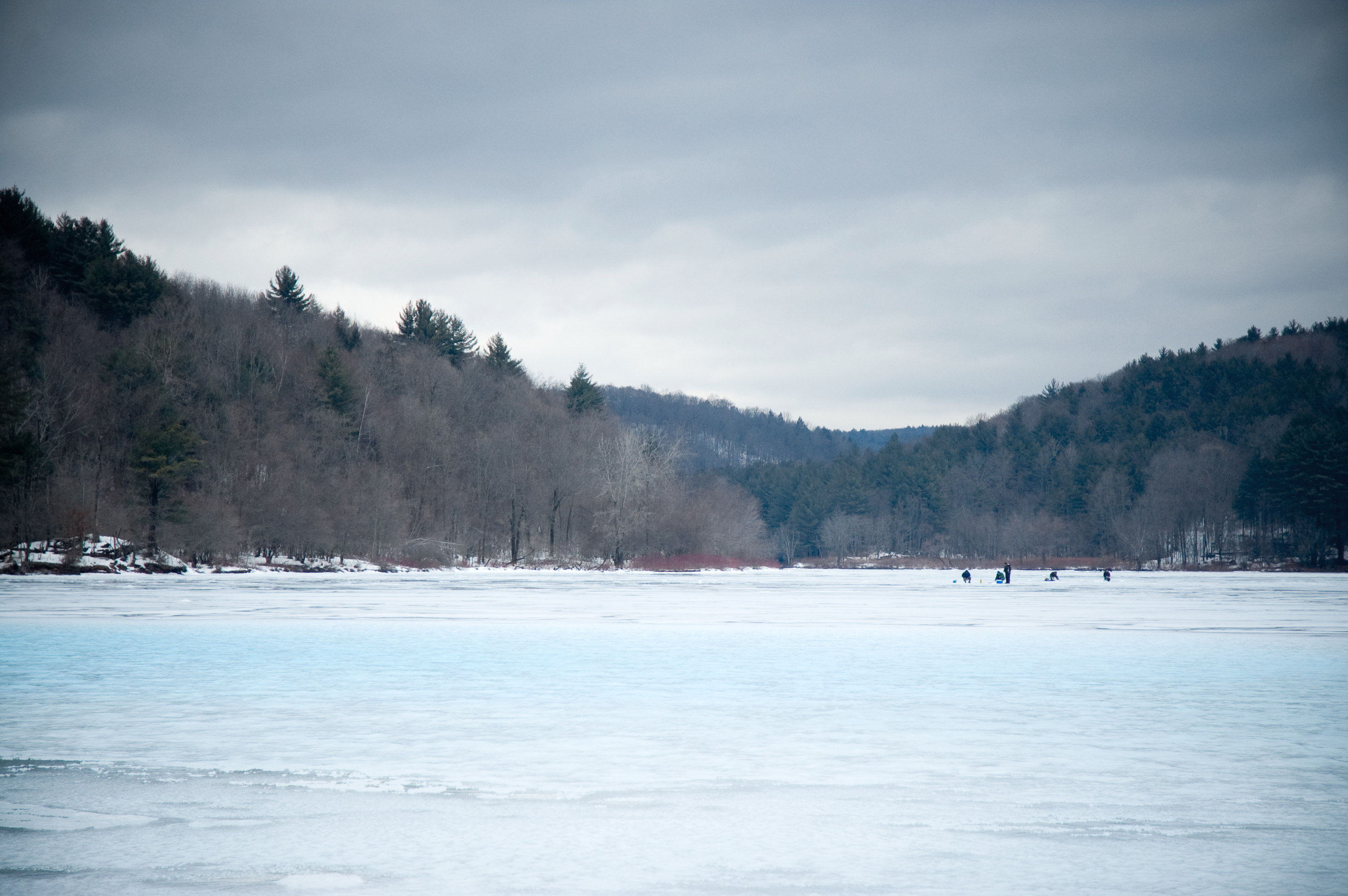
- Littleville Lake in 2008

- Location within Massachusetts Location within the United States
- Location: Chester / Huntington, Massachusetts, United States
- Coordinates: 42°15′52″N 072°52′53″W
- Type: Reservoir
- Primary inflows: Middle Branch of the Westfield River
- Primary outflows: Middle Branch of the Westfield River
- Catchment area: 52 sq mi (130 km^{2})
- Basin countries: United States
- Surface elevation: 509 ft (155 m)

Littleville Lake is located mostly in the town of Chester in Hampden County and partly in the town of Huntington in Hampshire County, Massachusetts. It was created by the US Army Corps of Engineers when the Middle Branch of the Westfield River was dammed to control flooding.
