= Massachusetts Route 143 =

State highway in Massachusetts, US

Route 143
- Map of western Massachusetts with Route 143 highlighted in red

Route information
- Maintained by MassDOT
- Length: 24.490 mi (39.413 km)
- Existed: by 1933–present
- History: Designated as Route 109A in 1930

Major junctions
- West end: Route 8 in Hinsdale
- Route 112 in Worthington
- East end: Route 9 in Williamsburg

Location
- Country: United States
- State: Massachusetts
- Counties: Berkshire, Hampshire

Highway system
- Massachusetts State Highway System; Interstate; US; State
← Route 142	→ Route 145

Route 143 is a state highway in the U.S. state of Massachusetts. The highway runs 24.490 miles (39.413 km) from Route 8 in Hinsdale east to Route 9 in Williamsburg. Route 143 passes through central Berkshire County town of Peru and the western Hampshire County towns of Worthington and Chesterfield.

== Route description ==
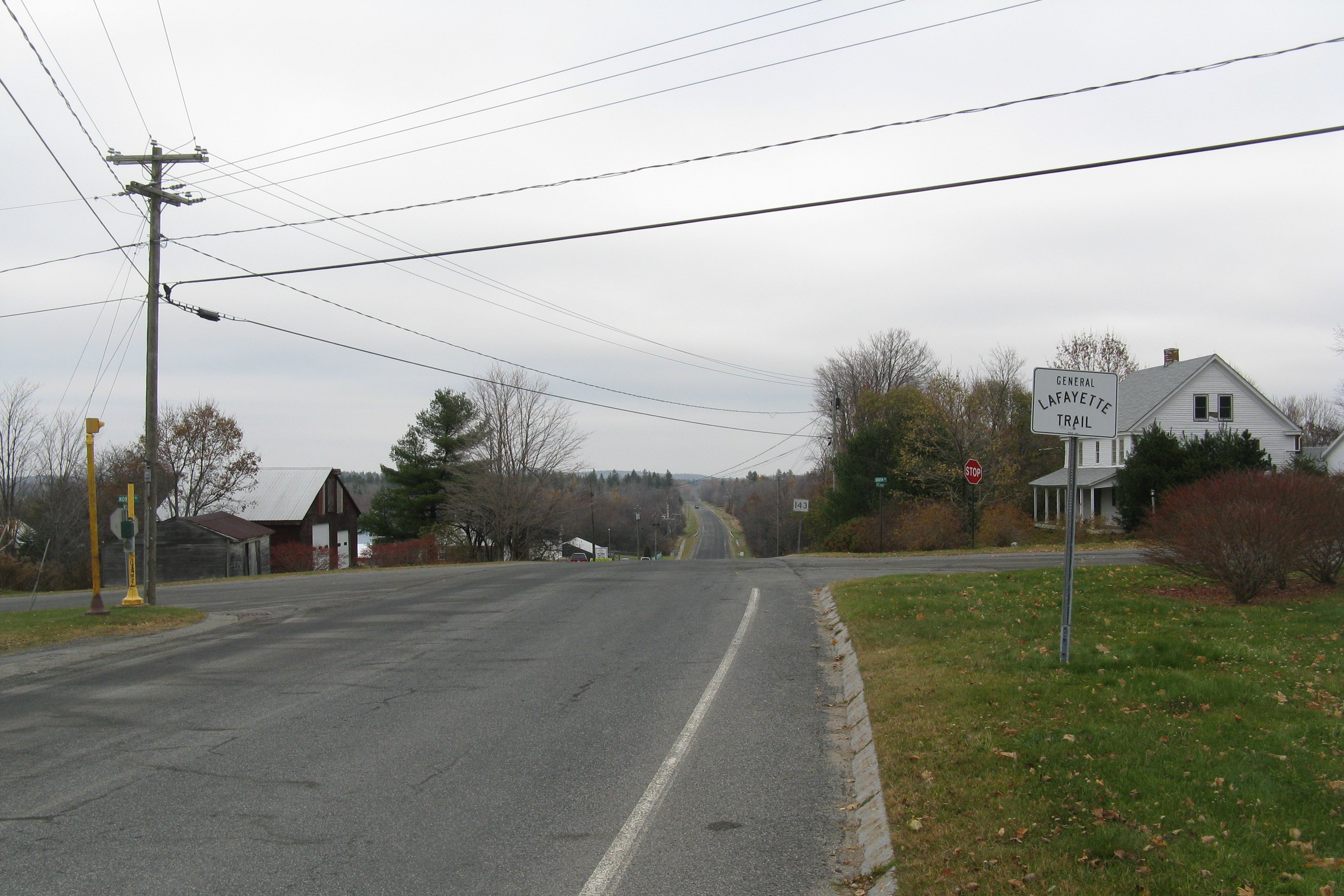
Eastbound Route 143 in Peru Center

Route 143 begins at an intersection with Route 8 (South Street) just east of the Eastern Branch of the Housatonic River in the town center of Hinsdale. The two-lane state highway heads east as Maple Street but becomes Peru Road at New Windsor Road. East of its crossing of Ashmere Lake, Route 143 enters the town of Peru and becomes Main Road. On the eastern edge of Peru and as the highway crosses the Berkshire–Hampshire county line into Worthington, the highway has a winding descent into the valley of the Middle Branch of the Westfield River. Route 143 ascends from the river valley as Old North Road. The highway meets Route 112 (Huntington Road) at Worthington Corners, and the two highways run concurrently northeast to where Route 112 splits north near the head of West Falls Branch. Route 143 descends along the valley of West Falls Branch into the Chesterfield Gorge, during which the highway enters the town of Chesterfield and its name changes to Main Road. The highway crosses the Eastern Branch of the Westfield River at the hamlet of West Chesterfield and ascends from the gorge to the town center of Chesterfield. Route 143 crosses the Dead Branch of the Westfield River and enters the town of Williamsburg at the headwaters of Meekin Brook. The highway, now named Chesterfield Road, follows the brook to its eastern terminus at Route 9 (Williams Street) immediately after crossing the Western Branch of the Mill River in the town center of Williamsburg.

== History ==
Route 143 was originally numbered Route 109A in 1930. The route was renumbered to 143 in 1933. From Hindsale to Worthington, Route 143 is known as the Lafayette Trail, named after American Revolutionary War hero Gilbert du Motier, Marquis de Lafayette, who spent the night in Worthington in 1825.

== Major intersections ==
County	Location	mi	km	Destinations	Notes
Berkshire	Hinsdale	0.000	0.000	Route 8 (South Street) – Dalton, Pittsfield, Becket	Western terminus
Hampshire	Worthington	12.354	19.882	Route 112 south (Huntington Road) – Huntington	Western end of Route 112 concurrency
Hampshire	Worthington	13.271	21.358	Route 112 north (Clark Road) – Cummington	Eastern end of Route 112 concurrency
Hampshire	Williamsburg	24.490	39.413	Route 9 (Williams Street) – Northampton, Amherst, Goshen	Eastern terminus
1.000 mi = 1.609 km; 1.000 km = 0.621 mi: Concurrency terminus
