= List of Massachusetts locations by per capita income =

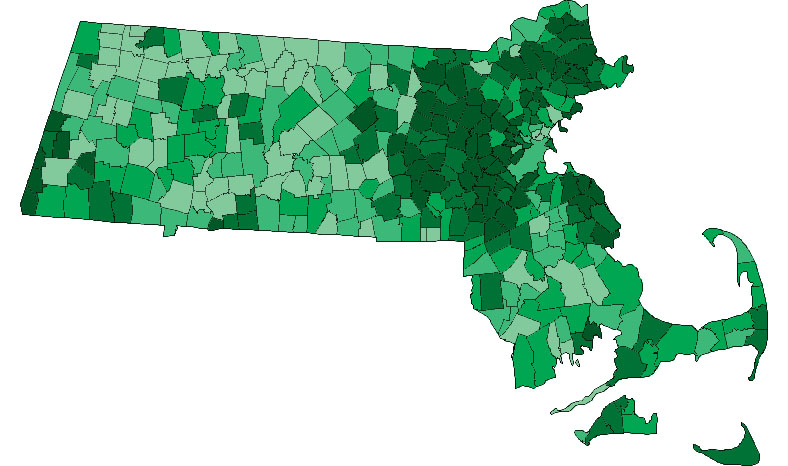
Map of locations by per capita income. Areas with higher levels of income are shaded darker.

Massachusetts is one of the wealthiest states in the United States of America, with a median household income of $101,341 (as of 2023), and a per capita income of $56,284 (as of 2023). Many of the state's wealthiest towns are located in the Boston suburbs. This area includes a high concentration of wealthy cities and towns just to the west of Boston, in the MetroWest area, and along the northern and southern coastal regions that have easy access to the city, in particular the North Shore of Boston. Many summer communities are located along the shores of Cape Cod where wealthy second homeowners vacation, and there are several other wealthy communities located farther west than the Boston Metro area clustered in suburban areas around Worcester and in rural areas in far western parts of the state. Data is from the 2009–2013 and 2017–2021 American Community Survey 5-Year Estimates where indicated.

== Counties ==
State Rank	US Rank	County	Per capita income	Median household income	Median family income	Population	Number of households
1	25	Norfolk	$46,920	$84,916	$108,943	677,296	257,451
2	30	Middlesex	$42,861	$82,090	$104,032	1,522,533	581,120
3	102	Barnstable	$36,142	$60,526	$76,311	215,449	95,398
		Massachusetts	$35,763	$66,866	$84,900	6,605,058	2,530,147
4	115	Plymouth	$35,220	$75,092	$90,431	497,386	179,617
5	117	Essex	$35,167	$67,311	$84,185	750,808	286,008
6	164	Dukes	$33,363	$66,288	$82,452	16,739	5,891
7	193	Suffolk	$32,835	$53,540	$61,449	735,701	288,240
8	244	Worcester	$31,537	$65,223	$81,519	802,688	299,663
9	365	Hampshire	$29,460	$61,227	$81,385	159,267	58,828
10	374	Berkshire	$29,294	$48,450	$65,216	130,545	55,301
11	378	Franklin	$29,259	$53,663	$67,785	71,408	30,534
12	412	Bristol	$28,837	$55,298	$72,018	549,870	210,037
		United States	$28,155	$53,046	$64,719	311,536,594	115,610,216
13	874	Hampden	$25,817	$49,094	$61,474	465,144	177,990

== Cities and towns ==
Ranking of cities and towns based on per capita income (2021 USD).

Updated with 2023 ACS 5-year estimates

Rank	Municipality	Type	County	Per capita income	Median household income	Median family income	Households	Population
1	Dover	Town	Norfolk	$138,720	$250,000+	$250,000+	1,916	5,894
2	Weston	Town	Middlesex	$131,707	$250,000+	$250,000+	3,532	11,827
3	Wellesley	Town	Norfolk	$113,079	$250,000+	$250,000+	8,668	29,365
4	Sherborn	Town	Middlesex	$110,567	$240,000+	$250,000+	1,515	4,406
5	Carlisle	Town	Middlesex	$110,381	$250,000+	$250,000+	1,800	5,215
6	Sudbury	Town	Middlesex	$109,780	$250,000+	$250,000+	6,208	18,912
7	Lexington	Town	Middlesex	$108,883	$219,402	$250,000+	12,301	34,235
8	Wayland	Town	Middlesex	$108,056	$221,250	$250,000+	4,779	13,859
9	Winchester	Town	Middlesex	$107,586	$218,176	$250,000+	8,149	22,875
10	Medfield	Town	Norfolk	$106,662	$214,801	$250,000+	4,373	12,775
11	Needham	Town	Norfolk	$100,288	$212,241	$250,000+	11,260	31,808
12	Concord	Town	Middlesex	$98,671	$212,315	$250,000+	6,722	18,424
13	Hopkinton	Town	Middlesex	$98,671	$204,418	$249,513	6,556	18,501
14	Cohasset	Town	Norfolk	$97,646	$187,060	$250,000+	3,146	8,295
15	Hingham	Town	Plymouth	$97,438	$181,017	$250,000+	9,252	24,061
16	Westwood	Town	Norfolk	$97,172	$205,000	$234,041	5,424	16,066
17	Southborough	Town	Worcester	$96,260	$192,006	$235,625	3,579	10,380
18	Harvard	Town	Worcester	$95,668	$200,688	$231,852	5,965	6,870
19	Newton	City	Middlesex	$95,106	$184,989	$231,607	21,038	88,647
20	Bolton	Town	Worcester	$93,182	$198,475	$216,582	1,853	5,606
21	Lincoln	Town	Middlesex	$92,437	$180,750	$203,828	2,566	6,941
22	Boxford	Town	Essex	$92,238	$192,605	$207,917	2,867	8,188
23	Brookline	Town	Norfolk	$92,199	$140,631	$222,410	26,762	62,620
24	Belmont	Town	Middlesex	$92,151	$178,188	$212,881	10,393	27,056
25	Marblehead	Town	Essex	$92,148	$165,859	$220,250	8,075	20,397
26	Duxbury	Town	Plymouth	$92,139	$171,471	$214,974	6,873	16,004
27	Sharon	Town	Norfolk	$92,077	$183,724	$204,080	6,395	18,477
28	Westford	Town	Middlesex	$92,051	$181,523	$202,939	16,567	24,535
29	Andover	Town	Essex	$91,988	$167,591	$215,530	13,235	36,323
30	Norwell	Town	Plymouth	$91,981	$182,637	$201,250	3,180	11,258
31	Lynnfield	Town	Essex	$91,889	$172,484	$198,974	4,536	12,874
32	Acton	Town	Middlesex	$91,869	$163,965	$201,800	9,653	24,184
33	Norfolk	Town	Norfolk	$91,860	$197,379	$216,648	2,967	11,531
34	Newbury	Town	Essex	$91,751	$176,196	$230,192	2,533	6,745
35	Wenham	Town	Essex	$91,715	$187,652	$207,244	1,291	5,006
36	Groton	Town	Middlesex	$91,667	$189,180	$241,103	3,235	11,254
37	Milton	Town	Norfolk	$91,611	$178,053	$213,325	25,458	28,382
38	Longmeadow	Town	Hampden	$91,603	$155,429	$195,938	5,889	15,574
39	North Andover	Town	Essex	$91,529	$174,358	$207,000	11,821	32,539
40	Hanover	Town	Plymouth	$91,449	$166,703	$197,083	4,707	14,398
41	Medway	Town	Norfolk	$90,921	$163,833	$195,313	4,006	13,113
42	Boxborough	Town	Middlesex	$90,234	$163,295	$199,091	1,918	5,185
43	Reading	Town	Middlesex	$90,201	$157,303	$190,667	11,327	25,518
44	Shrewsbury	Town	Worcester	$90,199	$140,594	$184,219	10,450	38,325
45	Walpole	Town	Norfolk	$90,174	$155,513	$196,510	10,321	25,993
46	Newburyport	City	Essex	$90,100	$142,815	$195,017	6,901	18,045
47	Arlington	Town	Middlesex	$89,993	$146,727	$189,635	16,122	45,234
48	Holliston	Town	Middlesex	$89,757	$161,063	$196,042	5,524	14,923
49	Scituate	Town	Plymouth	$88,873	$157,448	$198,276	5,469	18,133
50	Middleton	Town	Essex	$88,804	$153,534	$193,882	2,691	8,577
51	Dunstable	Town	Middlesex	$87,924	$202,379	$214,091	3,122	3,369
52	Littleton	Town	Middlesex	$86,914	$152,163	$185,956	4,291	9,823
53	Stow	Town	Middlesex	$85,817	$177,862	$205,536	5,573	7,130
54	Topsfield	Town	Essex	$85,803	$164,750	$199,000	2,543	6,580
55	Canton	Town	Norfolk	$84,855	$143,945	$184,026	8,973	23,744
56	Northborough	Town	Worcester	$84,247	$147,366	$192,181	8,193	15,863
57	North Reading	Town	Middlesex	$83,684	$147,550	$187,917	5,077	15,740
58	Millis	Town	Norfolk	$82,814	$150,536	$185,769	3,749	8,967
59	Wrentham	Town	Norfolk	$82,744	$150,544	$187,708	3,773	11,449
60	Bedford	Town	Middlesex	$81,912	$158,964	$207,179	10,094	15,793
61	Burlington	Town	Middlesex	$81,710	$135,531	$180,874	10,424	25,736
62	Franklin	Town	Norfolk	$80,755	$145,017	$185,173	11,395	33,592
63	Natick	Town	Middlesex	$80,686	$145,684	$188,471	13,174	37,090
64	Chelmsford	Town	Middlesex	$80,214	$145,294	$186,978	15,341	37,032
65	Georgetown	Town	Essex	$79,249	$145,887	$185,339	2,217	8,183
66	Essex	Town	Essex	$78,883	$139,432	$186,625	1,592	3,880
67	Douglas	Town	Worcester	$78,143	$142,222	$184,836	3,122	8,061
68	Princeton	Town	Worcester	$78,005	$148,244	$185,417	1,701	3,504
69	Sutton	Town	Worcester	$77,418	$148,462	$183,750	4,050	9,961
70	Tyringham	Town	Berkshire	$76,473	$136,875	$178,750	190	348
71	Swampscott	Town	Essex	$76,065	$138,465	$181,290	4,479	14,177
72	Wilmington	Town	Middlesex	$75,870	$144,894	$185,119	10,117	23,667
73	Wakefield	Town	Middlesex	$75,218	$133,875	$177,750	8,392	26,184
74	Tyngsborough	Town	Middlesex	$75,079	$145,010	$184,514	3,107	11,022
75	Provincetown	Town	Barnstable	$74,132	$88,280	$146,375	2,515	3,617
76	Holden	Town	Worcester	$73,842	$137,613	$180,000	6,543	19,684
77	Dedham	Town	Norfolk	$73,249	$138,750	$179,375	9,946	25,144
78	Nahant	Town	Essex	$72,774	$134,000	$177,250	1,227	3,334
79	Pembroke	Town	Plymouth	$71,158	$142,813	$185,328	5,016	18,361
80	Ashland	Town	Middlesex	$70,053	$135,781	$178,333	6,080	16,000
81	Ipswich	Town	Essex	$69,278	$133,150	$174,792	3,573	13,175
82	Hull	Town	Plymouth	$68,409	$135,236	$175,179	10,072	11,050
83	Sterling	Town	Worcester	$67,659	$135,606	$175,000	7,808	8,870
84	Marion	Town	Plymouth	$66,845	$136,406	$183,958	4,845	5,635
85	Maynard	Town	Middlesex	$66,689	$132,258	$174,167	10,096	11,352
86	Groveland	Town	Essex	$66,125	$132,875	$176,250	3,459	6,578
87	Mansfield	Town	Bristol	$65,765	$134,245	$175,930	23,004	23,000
88	Easton	Town	Bristol	$64,949	$132,828	$175,000	23,112	24,000
89	Nantucket	Town	Nantucket	$64,191	$126,667	$175,000	11,410	14,255
90	Marshfield	Town	Plymouth	$63,270	$132,245	$174,000	24,072	25,132
91	Berlin	Town	Worcester	$62,625	$130,250	$175,000	3,122	3,300
92	East Bridgewater	Town	Plymouth	$62,409	$130,523	$174,038	13,569	14,211
93	Oak Bluffs	Town	Dukes	$61,792	$126,538	$168,750	4,527	4,527
94	Hamilton	Town	Essex	$60,875	$132,000	$177,500	7,351	7,351
95	Grafton	Town	Worcester	$59,189	$130,750	$174,375	16,827	16,827
96	Sandwich	Town	Barnstable	$58,295	$127,500	$171,250	20,675	20,675
97	Mendon	Town	Worcester	$58,207	$130,500	$175,000	5,267	5,267
98	Cambridge	City	Middlesex	$57,498	$104,089	$164,667	34,386	118,403
99	Pelham	Town	Hampshire	$56,250	$130,000	$175,000	1,140	1,140
100	Tewksbury	Town	Middlesex	$55,989	$129,736	$174,167	28,352	28,352
101	Wilbraham	Town	Hampden	$54,286	$131,563	$174,750	13,509	13,509
102	Paxton	Town	Worcester	$54,125	$130,250	$175,000	4,433	4,433
103	Hadley	Town	Hampshire	$53,172	$128,500	$173,750	4,956	4,956
104	Kingston	Town	Plymouth	$53,152	$128,625	$173,750	12,629	12,629
105	Billerica	Town	Middlesex	$53,109	$125,625	$170,313	21,235	42,119
106	Uxbridge	Town	Worcester	$53,058	$127,917	$173,750	12,025	12,025
107	Foxborough	Town	Norfolk	$53,050	$127,750	$172,500	16,498	16,498
108	Egremont	Town	Berkshire	$53,044	$128,750	$172,500	1,360	1,360
109	Edgartown	Town	Dukes	$52,980	$127,375	$172,500	4,067	4,067
110	Ayer	Town	Middlesex	$52,925	$127,500	$172,500	7,411	7,411
111	Brewster	Town	Barnstable	$52,917	$127,500	$172,500	10,246	10,246
112	Leverett	Town	Franklin	$52,890	$130,000	$175,000	1,893	1,893
113	Hudson	Town	Middlesex	$52,761	$126,000	$172,500	19,063	19,063
114	Rochester	Town	Plymouth	$52,750	$125,000	$170,000	5,717	5,717
115	Hanson	Town	Plymouth	$52,730	$125,500	$170,000	10,209	10,209
116	Millbury	Town	Worcester	$52,708	$123,500	$165,000	13,449	13,449
117	Danvers	Town	Essex	$52,700	$123,750	$165,000	25,872	25,872
118	Plymouth	Town	Plymouth	$52,699	$123,000	$165,000	61,217	61,217
119	Orleans	Town	Barnstable	$52,675	$123,750	$165,000	6,200	6,200
120	Plainville	Town	Norfolk	$52,670	$122,500	$165,000	8,383	8,383
121	Wellfleet	Town	Barnstable	$52,639	$123,438	$165,313	3,000	3,000
122	Williamstown	Town	Berkshire	$52,600	$129,375	$170,625	7,700	7,700
123	Brimfield	Town	Hampden	$52,599	$122,500	$165,000	3,700	3,700
124	Tolland	Town	Hampden	$52,581	$121,875	$164,375	500	500
125	Whately	Town	Franklin	$52,530	$122,500	$165,000	1,400	1,400
126	Truro	Town	Barnstable	$52,488	$123,125	$165,625	2,300	2,300
127	Salisbury	Town	Essex	$52,450	$123,125	$165,625	8,400	8,400
128	Falmouth	Town	Barnstable	$52,413	$125,000	$167,500	32,000	32,000
129	Deerfield	Town	Franklin	$52,376	$123,125	$165,625	5,000	5,000
130	Rockport	Town	Essex	$52,361	$123,500	$165,750	7,000	7,000
131	Otis	Town	Berkshire	$52,359	$121,875	$163,750	1,600	1,600
132	Norwood	Town	Norfolk	$52,350	$125,000	$167,500	28,000	28,000
133	Windsor	Town	Berkshire	$52,300	$121,250	$163,750	900	900
134	Auburn	Town	Worcester	$52,283	$123,750	$165,625	16,000	16,000
135	Williamsburg	Town	Hampshire	$52,200	$122,500	$164,375	2,500	2,500
136	Boston	City	Suffolk	$52,191	$130,000	$170,000	675,000	675,000
137	Fairhaven	Town	Bristol	$52,129	$123,000	$165,000	16,000	16,000
138	Conway	Town	Franklin	$52,109	$121,875	$164,375	1,800	1,800
139	Harwich	Town	Barnstable	$52,100	$123,438	$165,313	12,000	12,000
140	Dennis	Town	Barnstable	$52,050	$124,000	$165,500	14,000	14,000
141	Gloucester	City	Essex	$52,000	$125,000	$166,000	30,000	30,000
142	Westhampton	Town	Hampshire	$51,947	$121,875	$163,750	1,200	1,200
143	Sheffield	Town	Berkshire	$51,803	$122,000	$164,000	3,500	3,500
144	Salem	City	Essex	$51,800	$126,000	$168,000	44,000	44,000
145	Worthington	Town	Hampshire	$51,720	$121,250	$163,750	1,200	1,200
146	Yarmouth	Town	Barnstable	$51,500	$123,500	$165,500	23,000	23,000
147	Eastham	Town	Barnstable	$51,375	$123,500	$165,750	5,500	5,500
148	Ludlow	Town	Hampden	$51,300	$123,000	$165,000	21,000	21,000
149	Webster	Town	Worcester	$51,085	$122,500	$164,375	16,000	16,000
150	Auburn	Town	Worcester	$50,957	$100,786	$124,063	16,027	6,595
151	West Stockbridge	Town	Berkshire	$50,810	$99,961	$140,833	488	1,164
152	Granby	Town	Hampshire	$50,800	$110,188	$140,188	2,530	6,110
153	Seekonk	Town	Bristol	$50,740	$116,310	$139,625	5,969	15,339
154	Mashpee	Town	Barnstable	$50,735	$95,852	$128,781	6,603	14,996
155	Pepperell	Town	Middlesex	$50,733	$126,976	$155,125	4,361	11,671
156	Holland	Town	Hampden	$50,709	$86,806	$105,938	968	2,591
157	Amesbury	Town	Essex	$50,600	$100,599	$127,791	7,326	17,286
158	Bourne	Town	Barnstable	$50,580	$95,349	$136,215	8,525	20,364
159	Townsend	Town	Middlesex	$50,473	$120,238	$132,598	15,498	41,995
160	North Attleborough	Town	Bristol	$50,410	$109,426	$136,578	12,273	30,557
161	South Hadley	Town	Hampshire	$50,140	$93,646	$115,632	6,002	18,051
162	Lenox	Town	Berkshire	$50,101	$97,569	$145,826	2,211	5,089
163	Westminster	Town	Worcester	$50,057	$101,161	$115,494	3,122	8,148
164	Shutesbury	Town	Franklin	$49,944	$108,021	$123,529	767	1,788
165	Shelburne	Town	Franklin	$49,801	$79,676	$105,083	711	1,436
166	Somerset	Town	Bristol	$49,668	$111,720	$127,132	7,248	18,271
167	Lakeville	Town	Plymouth	$49,600	$126,182	$148,428	4,162	11,514
168	Upton	Town	Worcester	$49,550	$155,952	$171,824	3,168	7,986
169	Leyden	Town	Franklin	$49,500	$105,357	$124,000	259	651
170	Plympton	Town	Plymouth	$49,389	$119,750	$133,603	989	2,934
171	Southampton	Town	Hampshire	$49,334	$125,534	$140,610	2,318	6,158
172	Ashby	Town	Middlesex	$49,331	$110,536	$118,036	1,297	3,189
173	Barnstable	City	Barnstable	$49,290	$97,348	$118,673	30,765	48,556
174	Middlefield	Town	Hampshire	$49,200	$89,063	$115,250	164	342
175	Richmond	Town	Berkshire	$49,001	$96,923	$123,438	21,346	30,671
176	Rowley	Town	Essex	$48,803	$117,177	$141,000	5,733	6,234
177	Beverly	City	Essex	$48,800	$103,739	$143,596	24,400	42,448
178	Hawley	Town	Franklin	$48,690	$99,375	$103,393	139	379
179	Westborough	Town	Worcester	$48,311	$134,474	$180,329	7,980	21,213
180	Boylston	Town	Worcester	$48,300	$124,732	$146,823	3,989	4,810
181	Southwick	Town	Hampden	$48,290	$108,833	$128,279	3,648	9,292
182	Rutland	Town	Worcester	$48,205	$155,504	$174,071	3,052	8,988
183	Ashfield	Town	Franklin	$48,199	$80,216	$97,143	819	1,710
184	Hopedale	Town	Worcester	$48,180	$115,216	$150,417	2,116	6,012
185	Raynham	Town	Bristol	$48,150	$117,950	$132,430	5,460	14,957
186	New Marlborough	Town	Berkshire	$48,132	$94,038	$121,250	652	1,573
187	Mount Washington	Town	Berkshire	$48,094	$127,813	$138,750	77	161
188	East Longmeadow	Town	Hampden	$48,081	$101,540	$141,535	6,011	16,386
189	Warren	Town	Worcester	$48,032	$66,587	$114,426	1,899	4,999
190	West Bridgewater	Town	Plymouth	$48,011	$124,483	$144,375	2,726	7,622
191	Norton	Town	Bristol	$47,756	$127,404	$147,031	6,489	19,270
192	Oxford	Town	Worcester	$47,711	$104,000	$129,052	4,800	13,399
193	Sunderland	Town	Franklin	$47,690	$61,442	$112,500	1,478	3,667
194	Wareham	Town	Plymouth	$47,663	$82,741	$98,799	10,280	23,149
195	Westport	Town	Bristol	$47,621	$100,703	$116,674	6,782	16,245
196	Gill	Town	Franklin	$47,569	$90,000	$111,875	1,328	1,708
197	Abington	Town	Plymouth	$47,550	$119,787	$135,224	6,083	16,974
198	Lunenburg	Town	Worcester	$47,490	$109,753	$117,173	4,432	11,627
199	Rehoboth	Town	Bristol	$47,380	$126,161	$140,000	4,377	12,434
200	Clarksburg	Town	Berkshire	$47,161	$78,028	$93,021	729	1,750
201	Quincy	City	Norfolk	$47,159	$95,711	$117,632	44,515	100,544
202	Stockbridge	Town	Berkshire	$47,100	$131,667	$186,563	811	1,827
203	Bellingham	Town	Norfolk	$47,036	$120,966	$131,477	6,250	16,934
204	Dalton	Town	Berkshire	$47,010	$81,168	$95,450	2,907	6,356
205	Marlborough	City	Middlesex	$46,876	$95,047	$116,489	17,147	41,505
206	Stoneham	Town	Middlesex	$46,850	$112,635	$156,991	9,578	23,077
207	Freetown	Town	Bristol	$46,790	$144,722	$144,167	3,369	9,165
208	Sturbridge	Town	Worcester	$46,781	$129,606	$151,046	3,890	9,806
209	Millville	Town	Worcester	$46,692	$115,789	$145,213	1,275	3,166
210	Waltham	City	Middlesex	$46,630	$116,560	$139,460	24,943	64,655
211	Hampden	Town	Hampden	$46,605	$110,703	$22,083	2,016	4,991
212	Stoughton	Town	Norfolk	$46,598	$104,164	$115,329	11,277	29,028
213	Melrose	City	Middlesex	$46,488	$126,854	$174,097	15,621	29,567
214	West Boylston	Town	Worcester	$46,481	$99,674	$121,921	2,825	7,874
215	Swansea	Town	Bristol	$46,429	$116,627	$133,596	6,752	17,020
216	Haverhill	City	Essex	$46,380	$87,675	$108,428	22,808	67,093
217	Saugus	Town	Essex	$46,350	$100,819	$118,792	10,581	28,521
218	Blackstone	Town	Worcester	$46,210	$98,986	$145,618	3,874	9,188
219	Middleborough	Town	Plymouth	$46,190	$91,914	$100,638	9,727	24,219
220	Templeton	Town	Worcester	$46,176	$103,277	$112,037	3,063	8,145
221	Berkley	Town	Bristol	$46,173	$123,877	$150,573	2,294	6,724
222	Ashburnham	Town	Worcester	$46,160	$115,420	$129,900	2,130	6,315
223	Belchertown	Town	Hampshire	$46,100	$99,089	$127,120	5,888	15,228
224	Northbridge	Town	Worcester	$46,087	$103,355	$130,479	6,364	16,291
225	Washington	Town	Berkshire	$46,073	$89,345	$94,625	246	501
226	Merrimac	Town	Essex	$46,027	$116,477	$140,167	2,589	6,698
227	New Ashford	Town	Berkshire	$45,900	$81,500	$96,250	90	223
228	Goshen	Town	Hampshire	$45,882	$93,125	$97,708	372	870
229	Methuen	City	Essex	$45,678	$103,270	$121,760	18,803	52,536
230	Agawam	City	Hampden	$45,593	$82,359	$110,767	11,785	28,715
231	Halifax	Town	Plymouth	$45,520	$106,851	$134,509	2,930	7,737
232	Hatfield	Town	Hampshire	$45,517	$100,381	$124,625	1,490	3,315
233	Blandford	Town	Hampden	$45,500	$88,587	$114,000	473	1,066
234	Charlton	Town	Worcester	$45,380	$119,809	$135,655	4,776	13,312
235	Dighton	Town	Bristol	$45,310	$137,616	$150,756	2,943	8,003
236	Heath	Town	Franklin	$45,174	$93,750	$89,500	314	728
237	Becket	Town	Berkshire	$45,038	$75,625	$92,386	974	2,152
238	New Braintree	Town	Worcester	$45,036	$99,375	$107,813	430	1,052
239	Dracut	Town	Middlesex	$44,724	$111,539	$125,577	12,370	32,356
240	West Brookfield	Town	Worcester	$44,661	$78,988	$98,316	1,535	3,814
241	Lanesborough	Town	Berkshire	$44,625	$84,419	$93,155	1,368	3,043
242	Hubbardston	Town	Worcester	$44,621	$102,344	$126,202	1,586	4,338
243	Northampton	City	Hampshire	$44,599	$78,467	$116,705	11,949	29,379
244	Granville	Town	Hampden	$44,580	$89,643	$21,625	657	1,658
245	Monson	Town	Hampden	$44,495	$84,067	$108,510	3,422	8,210
246	Great Barrington	Town	Berkshire	$44,481	$82,484	$109,527	3,096	7,169
247	Milford	Town	Worcester	$44,390	$92,726	$107,813	11,446	30,134
248	Avon	Town	Norfolk	$44,381	$129,487	$144,643	1,653	4,740
249	Holbrook	Town	Norfolk	$44,322	$107,768	$125,904	4,712	11,344
250	Dartmouth	Town	Bristol	$44,315	$98,662	$128,082	11,863	34,054
251	Bridgewater	City	Plymouth	$44,300	$112,482	$132,667	8,690	28,337
252	Plainfield	Town	Hampshire	$44,290	$78,750	$96,250	281	676
253	Northfield	Town	Franklin	$44,281	$102,470	$112,819	1,213	2,899
254	Shirley	Town	Middlesex	$44,279	$121,875	$146,125	2,345	7,400
255	Lancaster	Town	Worcester	$44,263	$130,444	$147,772	2,818	8,428
256	Clinton	Town	Worcester	$44,202	$93,849	$111,250	6,455	15,221
257	Whitman	Town	Plymouth	$44,190	$107,794	$131,563	5,684	15,116
258	Peru	Town	Berkshire	$44,158	$83,125	$103,750	325	744
259	Wales	Town	Hampden	$44,142	$93,971	$111,442	813	1,996
260	Petersham	Town	Worcester	$44,101	$107,656	$118,393	458	1,141
261	Chesterfield	Town	Hampshire	$44,083	$102,031	$110,750	460	1,087
262	Winchendon	Town	Worcester	$44,077	$85,160	$102,571	3,745	10,371
263	Easthampton	City	Hampshire	$44,065	$72,925	$93,953	7,796	16,120
264	Oakham	Town	Worcester	$44,058	$96,207	$108,281	625	1,621
265	Spencer	Town	Worcester	$44,022	$79,086	$98,622	5,186	11,963
266	Woburn	City	Middlesex	$43,975	$107,754	$128,136	15,165	40,967
267	Framingham	City	Middlesex	$43,910	$98,179	$118,119	27,604	72,362
268	Randolph	City	Norfolk	$43,904	$103,129	$120,918	12,150	34,661
269	Medford	City	Middlesex	$43,900	$118,089	$152,919	28,321	60,708
270	Acushnet	Town	Bristol	$43,891	$91,050	$114,156	4,091	10,520
271	Brookfield	Town	Worcester	$43,882	$71,875	$124,412	1,395	3,435
272	Lee	Town	Berkshire	$43,875	$74,222	$124,286	2,306	5,784
273	Rockland	Town	Plymouth	$43,869	$101,475	$119,323	6,654	17,774
274	Warwick	Town	Franklin	$43,860	$95,000	$112,386	319	762
275	Attleboro	City	Bristol	$43,858	$93,266	$106,104	17,918	46,146
276	Carver	Town	Plymouth	$43,855	$78,955	$114,489	5,666	11,641
277	North Brookfield	Town	Worcester	$43,853	$81,010	$94,349	1,883	4,757
278	West Springfield	City	Hampden	$43,850	$70,401	$92,731	12,734	28,814
279	East Brookfield	Town	Worcester	$43,841	$76,382	$84,838	835	2,040
280	Russell	Town	Hampden	$43,839	$105,833	$116,538	555	1,385
281	Cheshire	Town	Berkshire	$43,830	$72,028	$93,021	1,509	3,243
282	Sandisfield	Town	Berkshire	$43,829	$88,250	$97,500	318	901
283	Watertown	City	Middlesex	$43,821	$123,422	$150,521	16,027	35,171
284	Barre	Town	Worcester	$43,810	$95,607	$107,270	1,918	5,531
285	Leicester	Town	Worcester	$43,802	$95,776	$118,459	3,924	11,077
286	Winthrop	City	Suffolk	$43,799	$106,357	$142,270	8, 539	19,088
287	Hancock	Town	Berkshire	$43,793	$93,125	$115,536	296	749
288	Pittsfield	City	Berkshire	$43,759	$68,386	$86,117	19,290	43,890
289	Braintree	City	Norfolk	$43,730	$125,305	$155,054	14,384	38,712
290	Royalston	Town	Worcester	$43,723	$101,705	$112,750	551	1,461
291	Phillipston	Town	Worcester	$43,690	$92,027	$105,000	716	1,948
292	Montgomery	Town	Hampden	$43,592	$91,706	$105,823	823	823
293	New Salem	Town	Franklin	$43,491	$78,611	$82,019	452	1,072
294	Westfield	City	Hampden	$43,488	$82,847	$104,868	15,292	40,922
295	Lowell	City	Middlesex	$43,450	$76,205	$90,520	42,285	114,804
296	Somerville	City	Middlesex	$43,430	$127,056	$154,920	39,745	79,816
297	Peabody	City	Essex	$43,424	$95,278	$123,351	22,208	54,200
298	Cummington	Town	Hampshire	$43,408	$101,250	$128,861	408	975
299	Palmer	Town	Hampden	$43,398	$78,789	$96,679	5,207	12,434
300	Sunderland	Town	Franklin	$43,380	$61,442	$112,500	1,666	3,667
301	Bernardston	Town	Franklin	$43,376	$78,427	$89,779	838	2,081
302	Hardwick	Town	Worcester	$43,351	$81,250	$109,750	1,028	2,713
303	Colrain	Town	Franklin	$43,341	$86,429	$97,431	726	1,693
304	Florida	Town	Berkshire	$43,329	$90,078	$94,545	318	783
305	Leominster	City	Worcester	$43,314	$81,556	$111,235	17,896	43,478
306	Charlemont	Town	Franklin	$43,295	$59,327	$100,417	498	1,062
307	Huntington	Town	Hampshire	$43,230	$94,871	$118,144	911	2,205
308	Adams	Town	Berkshire	$43,215	$56,285	$92,057	3,948	8,161
309	Taunton	City	Bristol	$43,176	$79,715	$97,441	23,159	59,076
310	Revere	City	Suffolk	$43,169	$81,121	$96,502	21,647	60,720
311	Wendell	Town	Franklin	$43,155	$69,213	$92,500	411	916
312	Montague	Town	Franklin	$43,149	$72,344	$91,250	3,765	8,565
313	Hinsdale	Town	Berkshire	$43,120	$76,129	$78,672	779	1,866
314	Rowe	Town	Franklin	$43,110	$87,917	$90,000	165	434
315	Weymouth	City	Norfolk	$43,061	$100,077	$138,438	24,400	57,437
316	Buckland	Town	Franklin	$42,987	$80,999	$86,500	886	2,083
317	Erving	Town	Franklin	$42,781	$74,550	$93,875	681	1,697
318	Greenfield	City	Franklin	$42,762	$53,961	$73,958	8,100	17,661
319	Savoy	Town	Berkshire	$42,753	$55,000	$87,292	330	708
320	Dudley	Town	Worcester	$42,730	$85,179	$103,125	4,199	11,890
321	Ware	Town	Hampshire	$42,686	$69,666	$90,658	4,557	10,067
322	Everett	City	Middlesex	$42,490	$79,658	$78,474	17,007	48,368
323	Chester	Town	Hampden	$42,450	$87,308	$91,635	517	1,400
324	North Adams	City	Berkshire	$42,437	$48,521	$66,778	5,540	13,024
325	Chicopee	City	Hampden	$42,400	$66,927	$81,540	23,852	55,636
326	Worcester	City	Worcester	$42,390	$67,544	$81,107	78,780	203,867
327	Malden	City	Middlesex	$42,385	$95,298	$111,074	32,285	65,602
328	Brockton	City	Plymouth	$42,321	$77,089	$89,236	35,092	104,216
329	Gardner	City	Worcester	$42,248	$62,948	$76,368	8,841	21,183
330	Fitchburg	City	Worcester	$42,208	$70,659	$84,838	16,398	41,796
331	Southbridge Town	City	Worcester	$42,190	$59,397	$79,454	7,094	17,643
332	Lynn	City	Essex	$42,176	$74,715	$86,600	36,280	100,233
333	Orange	Town	Franklin	$42,155	$54,105	$67,218	2,982	7,622
334	Athol	Town	Worcester	$42,137	$65,458	$78,627	4,734	11,922
335	Fall River	City	Bristol	$42,130	$53,933	$66,091	40,862	93,339
336	Chelsea	City	Suffolk	$42,103	$72,220	$72,690	13,353	40,025
337	New Bedford	City	Bristol	$42,088	$56,052	$69,567	41,395	100,309
338	Amherst	City	Hampshire	$42,080	$65,938	$136,949	9,328	39,416
339	Holyoke	City	Hampden	$42,067	$51,892	$65,381	15,062	38,480
340	Lawrence	City	Essex	$42,055	$57,903	$86,600	30,291	87,798
341	Springfield	City	Hampden	$42,054	$51,339	$67,267	58,344	155,770

== Sources ==
- http://www.massbenchmarks.org/statedata/data/median99.pdf
- https://www.census.gov/
- Garland, Joseph E., Boston's Gold Coast : the North Shore, 1890-1929, Boston, MA : Little, Brown & Co., 1981.
