= Massachusetts Route 112 =

State highway in Massachusetts, US

Route 112
- Route 112 highlighted in red

Route information
- Maintained by MassDOT
- Length: 54.11 mi (87.08 km)
- Existed: by 1930–present

Major junctions
- South end: US 20 in Huntington
- Route 66 in Huntington; Route 143 in Worthington; Route 9 from Cummington to Goshen; Route 116 in Ashfield; Route 2 from Buckland to Shelburne
- North end: VT 112 at the Vermont state line in Colrain

Location
- Country: United States
- State: Massachusetts
- Counties: Hampshire, Franklin

Highway system
- Massachusetts State Highway System; Interstate; US; State
← Route 111	→ Route 113

Route 112 is a 54.11-mile-long (87.08 km) rural state highway through western Franklin and Hampshire Counties. It begins at U.S. Route 20 (US 20) in Huntington and ends at the Vermont state line in Colrain, where it continues as Vermont Route 112.

== Route description ==
Route 112 begins in Huntington at U.S. Route 20, near the junction of the branches of the Westfield River. It heads north from the downtown area, immediately crossing the West Branch and closely following the Middle Branch until it and the North Branch split, at which point it continues to follow the North Branch. In the village of Knightville, Route 112 meets the western end of Route 66, which leads to Northampton. The route continues northward through town, passing the Knightville State Wildlife Management Area and the Hiram H. Fox State Wildlife Management Area before entering the town of Worthington.

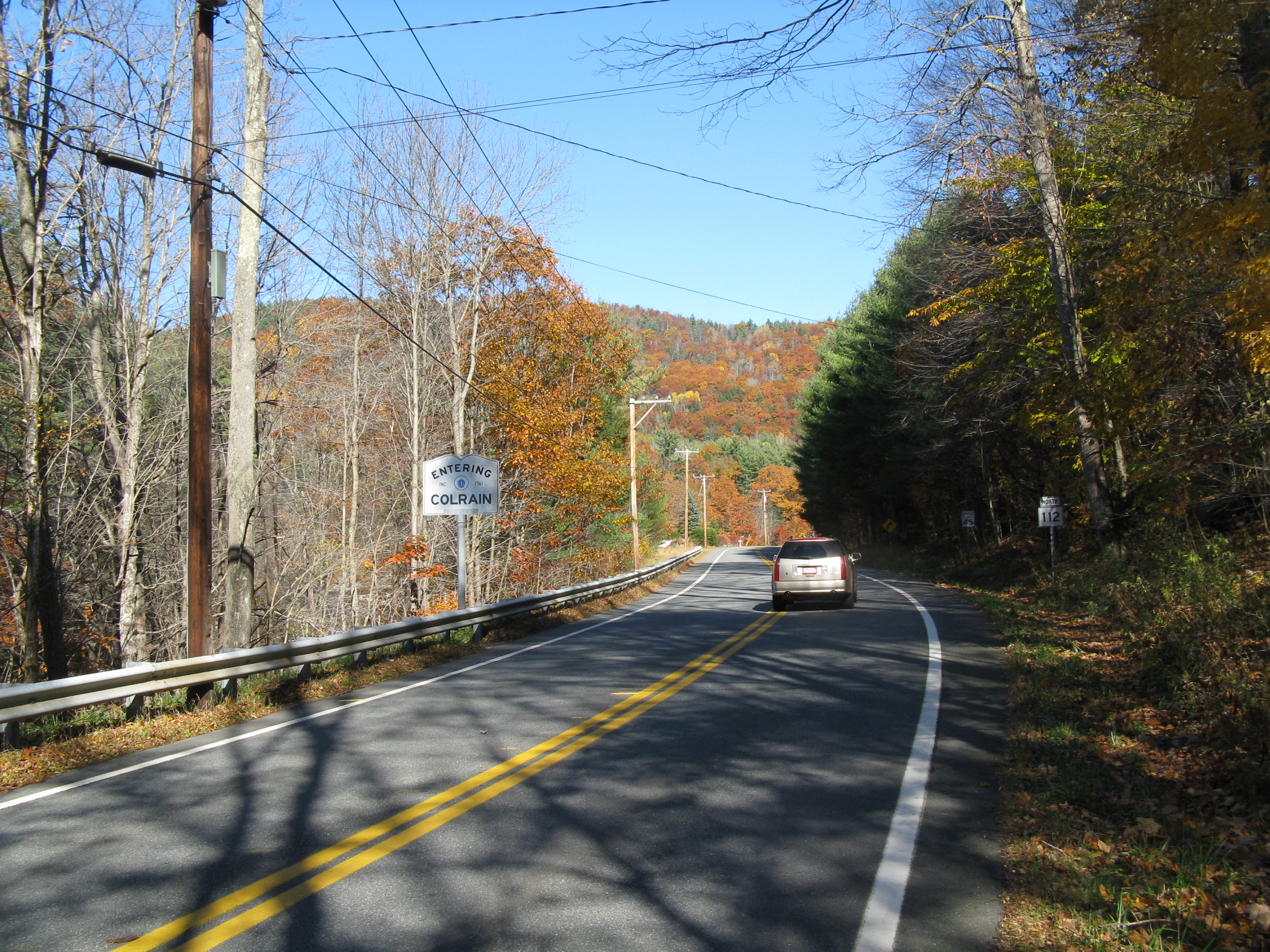
Route 112 northbound entering Colrain

In Worthington, Route 112 heads through the center of town until it meets Route 143 for a mile-long concurrency, splitting to the north and heading to Cummington. In Cummington, Route 112 turns eastward abruptly at Five Corners before meeting Route 9 near the North Branch once again. The two routes pass concurrently along the river through the center of town before heading into Goshen, finally splitting near the Lower Highland Lake, where Route 112 turns northwards towards Ashfield. In Ashfield, Route 116 shares the route for over a mile before that route turns eastward towards the town center.

Route 112 continues northward into the town of Buckland. The route bends to the northeast before looping over and meeting Route 2 (the Mohawk Trail) in the village of Shelburne Falls. The route passes concurrently with Route 2 over the Deerfield River into the town of Shelburne. In Shelburne, Route 112 splits from Route 2, turning around Mechanic and Hope Streets onto Main Street, where it turns northward and crosses under Route 2 once again. From there, Route 112 follows the North River into the town of Colrain. The route runs along the river's side, crossing it in the village of Griswoldville and again in the center of the town and in the far northern end of town, before meeting the Vermont town line and continuing into Halifax as Vermont Route 112.

== History ==
In 1930, the route between Worthington and Cummington lay to the east of the current route. Also, Route 112 departed Route 9 in the Lithia section of Cummington, traveling north to Route 116 and then following the current route from Ashfield to Shelburne. At that time, the road ended at the junction with Route 2. The route was extended to Vermont, along what was previously Route 56, in 1939, with Route 56 subsequently re-used elsewhere. The section between Worthington and Cummington was also moved to the current route during this time period. Between 1966 and 1969, an existing road between Goshen and Route 116 was upgraded to a highway and Route 112 was rerouted there.

== Major intersections ==
County	Location	mi	km	Destinations	Notes
Hampshire	Huntington	0.00	0.00	US 20 – Russell, Westfield, Lee	Southern terminus
Hampshire	Huntington	3.5	5.6	Route 66 east – Westhampton, Northampton	Western terminus of Route 66
Hampshire	Worthington	14.4	23.2	Route 143 west – Hinsdale	Southern end of Route 143 concurrency
Hampshire	Worthington	15.3	24.6	Route 143 east – Chesterfield	Northern end of Route 143 concurrency
Hampshire	Cummington	20.9	33.6	Route 9 west – Dalton, Pittsfield	Southern end of Route 9 concurrency
Hampshire	Goshen	27.9	44.9	Route 9 east – Northampton, Amherst	Northern end of Route 9 concurrency
Franklin	Ashfield	32.4	52.1	Route 116 north – Plainfield, Adams	Southern end of Route 116 concurrency
Franklin	Ashfield	33.8	54.4	Route 116 south – Ashfield Center, Conway	Northern end of Route 116 concurrency
Franklin	Buckland	41.9	67.4	Route 2 west – North Adams, Troy, NY	Southern end of Route 2 concurrency
Franklin	Shelburne	42.6	68.6	Route 2 east – Greenfield, Boston	Northern end of Route 2 concurrency
Franklin	Colrain	54.11	87.08	VT 112 north – Halifax	Continuation into Vermont
1.000 mi = 1.609 km; 1.000 km = 0.621 mi: Concurrency terminus
