= Hampshire Council of Governments =

Membership overview
- Formed: 1999
- Preceding Membership: County of Hampshire
- Dissolved: 2019
- Jurisdiction: Hampshire County, Massachusetts
- Headquarters: Northampton Courthouse
- Website: hcg-ma.org

The Hampshire Council of Governments was a government entity with principal offices in Northampton, Massachusetts.

== History ==
The county government was abolished by the state in 1999 with a Hampshire Council of Governments formed in its place. Hampshire Care Hospital was transferred over to the council from the county government

While the state law allowing municipal and regional governments to form regional cohorts was passed in 1997, the council began its electricity supplier program in 2006 with school districts and municipal governments as clients. In 2010, the council move to become the franchised electricity supplier for residential service in the member-towns.

Hadley town meeting voted to withdrawal from the council on October 5, 2017, while Belchertown Town Meeting voted to leave on May 14, 2018.

With no inherent source of income, given liabilities and no regional planning function, the Council of Governments ended up winding up operations in 2019.

== Membership ==
Membership in the Hampshire Council was voluntary. By the end of its existence, towns with full membership included Belchertown, Chesterfield, Cummington, Goshen, Granby, Hadley, Hatfield, Huntington, Middlefield, Pelham, Plainfield, South Hadley, Southampton, Westhampton, and Williamsburg. Each town had one or more Councilors, elected by the voters in their local Town Elections.

== Programs ==
'The Cooperative Purchasing Coop coordinated and administered a formal bidding process for bulk buying.

Hampshire County Group Insurance Trust The Hampshire Councilors served as the trustees of the Hampshire County Group Insurance Trust, a cooperative effort to provide health and life insurance for 68 governmental units - of which twenty-six are public employers in Hampshire County, thirty-six in Franklin County, three in Hampden County, and three in Worcester County. The Insurance Trust served approximately 10,000 employees and their dependents.

Hampshire Power and Community Choice Electricity Aggregation The council had two programs providing low-cost electricity to customers in Western Massachusetts.

Hampshire Power serves eighty town governments, school districts, and fire and water districts in Berkshire, Franklin, Hampden, Hampshire, and Worcester Counties. As of August 2012, customers have saved over $1.6 million on their bills. In addition, Hampshire Power serves one state agency, plus several non-profits and businesses.

The Hampshire Council filed petitions for Municipal Aggregation of Electricity on behalf of 35 communities in Berkshire, Franklin, Hampden, Hampshire, and Worcester Counties. After approval by state regulators, the council would arrange supply for those customers who have not chosen an independent supplier in the communities. These included Great Barrington in Berkshire County; Hampden in Hampden County; thirteen participating communities in Hampshire County including Chesterfield, Cummington, Goshen, Granby, Hadley, Hatfield, Huntington, Middlefield, Northampton, Pelham, Plainfield, Westhampton, and Williamsburg; twelve Franklin County participating towns including Charlemont, Conway, Deerfield, Gill, Heath, Leverett, Montague, Northfield, Rowe, Warwick, Wendell, and Whately; and eight Worcester County participating towns: Barre, Brookfield, East Brookfield, Mendon, New Braintree, North Brookfield, Upton, and West Brookfield.

In addition to these 35 communities, other towns and cities working to complete the initial process, included Egremont and Washington in Berkshire County; Bernardston and Orange in Franklin County; Blandford, Holland, Ludlow, Monson, and Montgomery in Hampden County; and Athol, Berlin, Charlton, Hardwick, Leicester, Millville, and Oxford in Worcester County. Altogether, the 51 communities had a combined population of over 230,000 people.

Regional Services The Regional Services Department developed regional approaches to problems shared by Hampshire County municipalities, including securing surplus federal equipment. Regional Services oversaw the Hampshire Inspection Program that provided building inspection and zoning enforcement services. The department produced a wage and salary survey of all municipal positions in Hampshire County.

Health Programs The council was involved in tobacco prevention efforts through the Tobacco Free Network serving both Franklin and Hampshire Counties. Funding for this program was provided by a grant from the Department of Public Health.

As an integral part of the Hampshire County Group Insurance Trust, the Hampshire Council ran a Wellness Initiative.

Other Programs In addition to the various departments, programs, and services, the Councilors attended monthly Full Board Meetings as well as Standing Committee Meetings, including the Executive Committee, Human Services Municipal Advisory Committee, Legislative, Charter & Code Committee, Regional Services Municipal Advisory Committee, Electric Committee, and Finance Committee. Each Committee had oversight of specific departments and programs and continues to look for ways to increase revenue and provide services.

The Executive Committee was responsible for the more routine activities of the council and its various departments, oversees the carrying out of the policies voted by the Councilors and the duties of the Council Administrator, reviewed the proposed budget, acted as the Road Viewing and Hearing Committee, and served as the Real Estate Tax Appeal Board.

The Human Services Committee was responsible for all health-related programs.

The Legislative, Charter & Code Committee was generally responsible for the council's interest in all matters primarily concerned with State legislation. The committee was also entrusted with making recommendations to the Full Council for proposed amendments to the Council Charter and to review the Administrative Code.

The Regional Services Committee served as liaison with the Hampshire County Fire Defense Association, and provided general supervision of the Regional Services and Cooperative Purchasing Departments. The committee was, towards the end of its operations, attempting to increase its exposure and advertising outreach.

The Electricity Committee pursued cost-saving energy supply for Hampshire County municipalities, residents, businesses, and non-profits.
