= North Branch Westfield River =

River in the United States of America

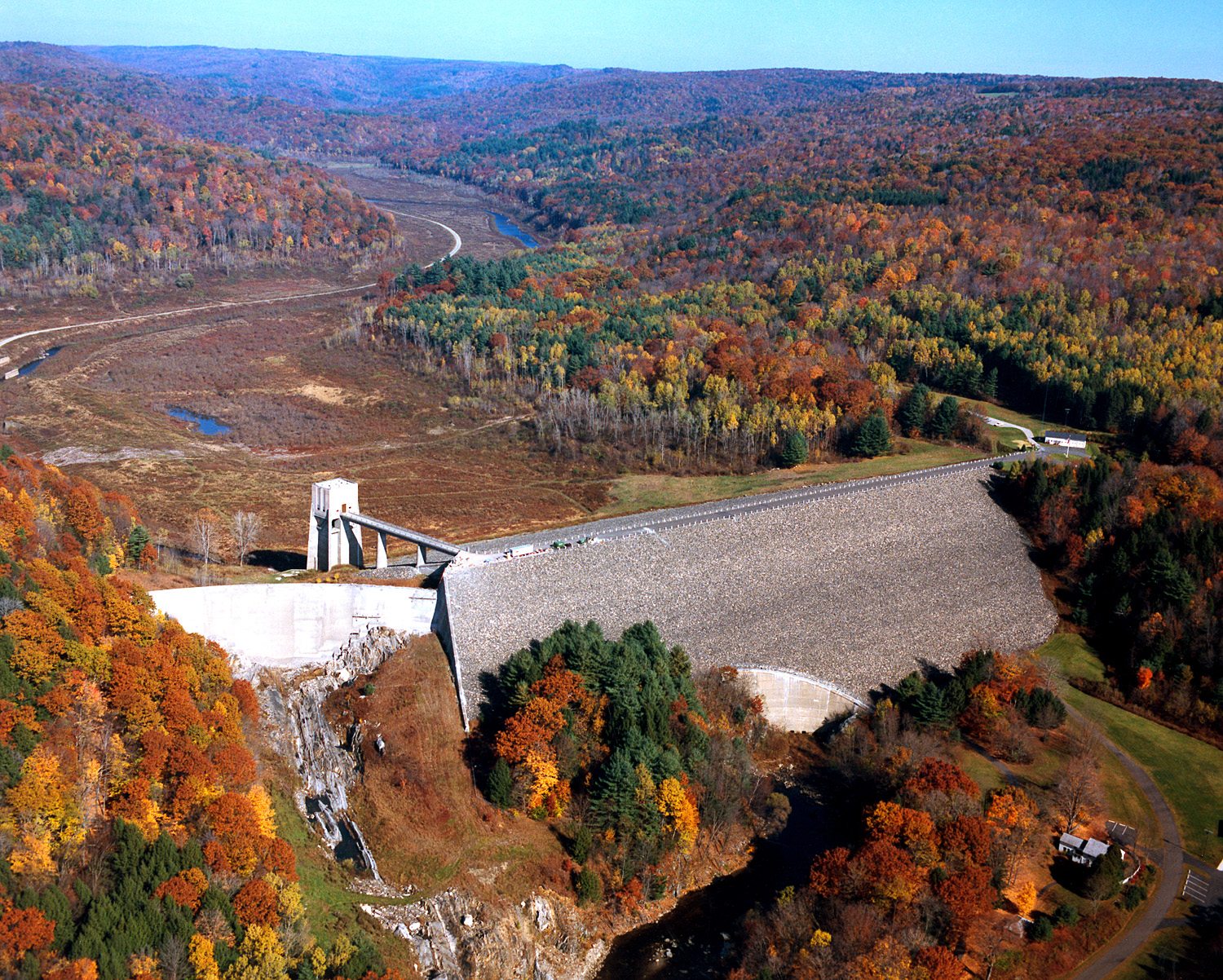
- Knightville Dam on the North Branch Westfield River in Hampshire County, Massachusetts

National Wild and Scenic River
- Designated: November 2, 1993

The North Branch of the Westfield River (sometimes called the East Branch) starts at the town of Savoy, Massachusetts, in the Berkshires. It flows southeasterly to the town of Cummington where it follows Route 9 to the junction with the Swift River. Here it turns sharply south and flows through the picturesque Pork Barrel region to West Chesterfield. It continues through a wilderness region to the Knightville Reservoir. From here it continues south for about 5 miles to Huntington, Massachusetts, where it becomes the main branch of the Westfield River. The Middle Branch and the West Branch join it in this section.
