= Huntington (CDP), Massachusetts =

Huntington, Massachusetts
- Census-designated place
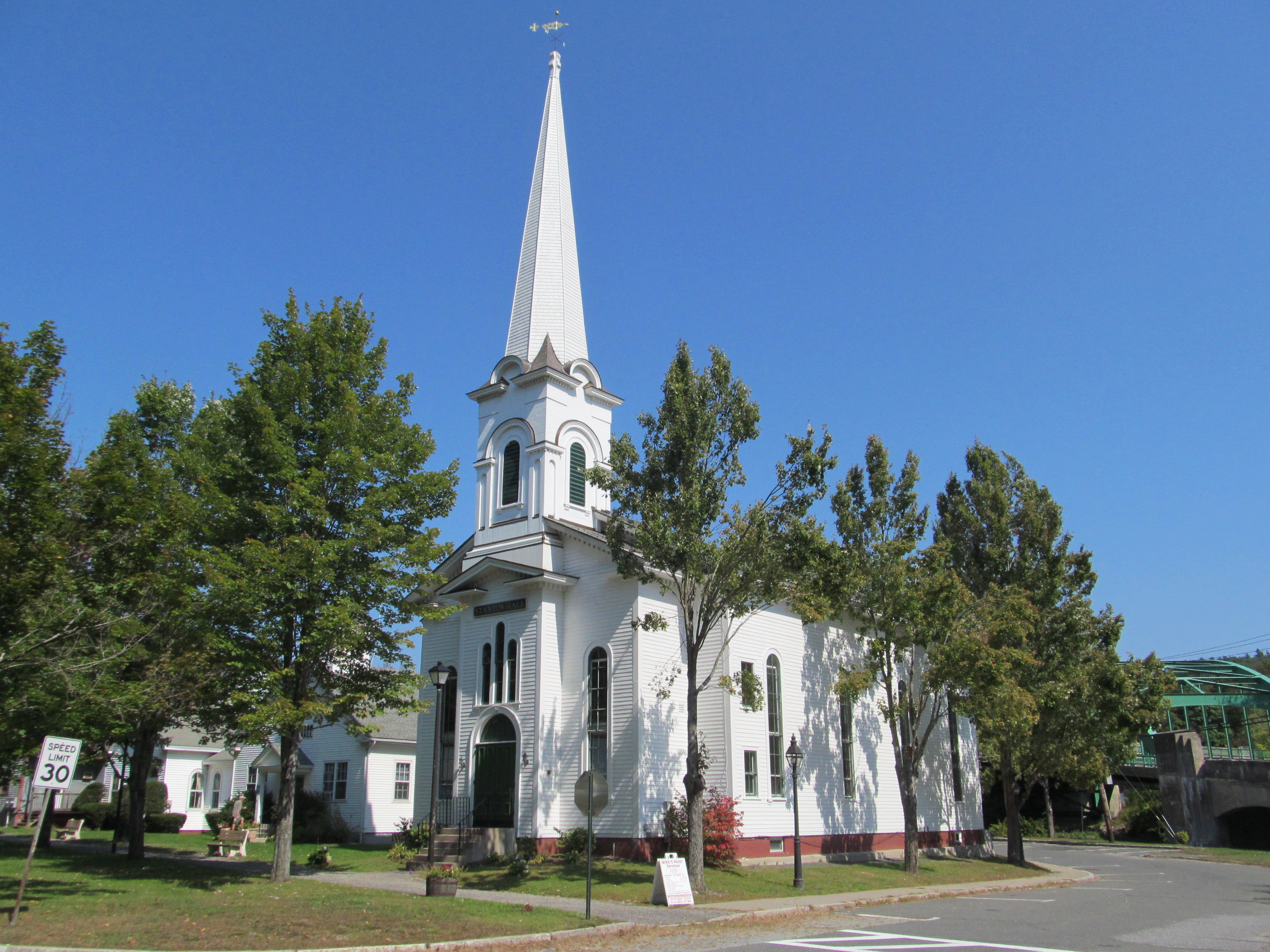
- Stanton Hall

- Location in Hampshire County in Massachusetts
- Coordinates: 42°14′0″N 72°52′46″W
- Country: United States
- State: Massachusetts
- County: Hampshire
- Town: Huntington

Area
  - Total: 4.74 sq mi (12.28 km^{2})
  - Land: 4.63 sq mi (11.99 km^{2})
  - Water: 0.11 sq mi (0.29 km^{2})
- Elevation: 377 ft (115 m)

Population (2020)
  - Total: 857
  - Density: 185.1/sq mi (71.48/km^{2})
- Time zone: UTC-5 (Eastern (EST))
  - Summer (DST): UTC-4 (EDT)
- ZIP code: 01050
- Area code: 413
- FIPS code: 25-31750
- GNIS feature ID: 0608324

Huntington is a census-designated place (CDP) comprising the main village in the town of Huntington in Hampshire County, Massachusetts, United States. The population of the CDP was 936 at the 2010 census, out of a total town population of 2,180. It is part of the Springfield, Massachusetts Metropolitan Statistical Area.

== Geography ==
The Huntington CDP is located in the southwestern corner of the town of Huntington. It is bordered to the northwest by the town of Chester, to the southwest by the town of Blandford, to the southeast by the towns of Russell and Montgomery, and to the northeast by the remainder of the town of Huntington. Montgomery Road, the Westfield River, and the Middle Branch of the Westfield former the boundary between the CDP and the rest of the town.

The village of Huntington is in the center of the CDP, at the juncture of the Westfield River with its West Branch. U.S. Route 20 passes through the village, leading southeast down the Westfield River valley 11 miles (18 km) to the city of Westfield, and northwest up the valley of the West Branch 7 miles (11 km) to Chester and eventually 23 miles (37 km) to Lee. Massachusetts Route 112 leads north from Huntington up the Westfield River valley 22 miles (35 km) to Cummington.

The village of Norwich Bridge is in the northern part of the CDP, where Route 112 crosses the Westfield River.

According to the United States Census Bureau, the Huntington CDP has a total area of 4.7 square miles (12.2 km^{2}), of which 4.6 square miles (12.0 km^{2}) are land and 0.1 square miles (0.2 km^{2}), or 2.22%, are water.

== Demographics ==
Historical population
Census	Pop.	Note	%±
2020	857		—
U.S. Decennial Census
