= Hampshire County, Massachusetts =

County in Massachusetts, United States

- County
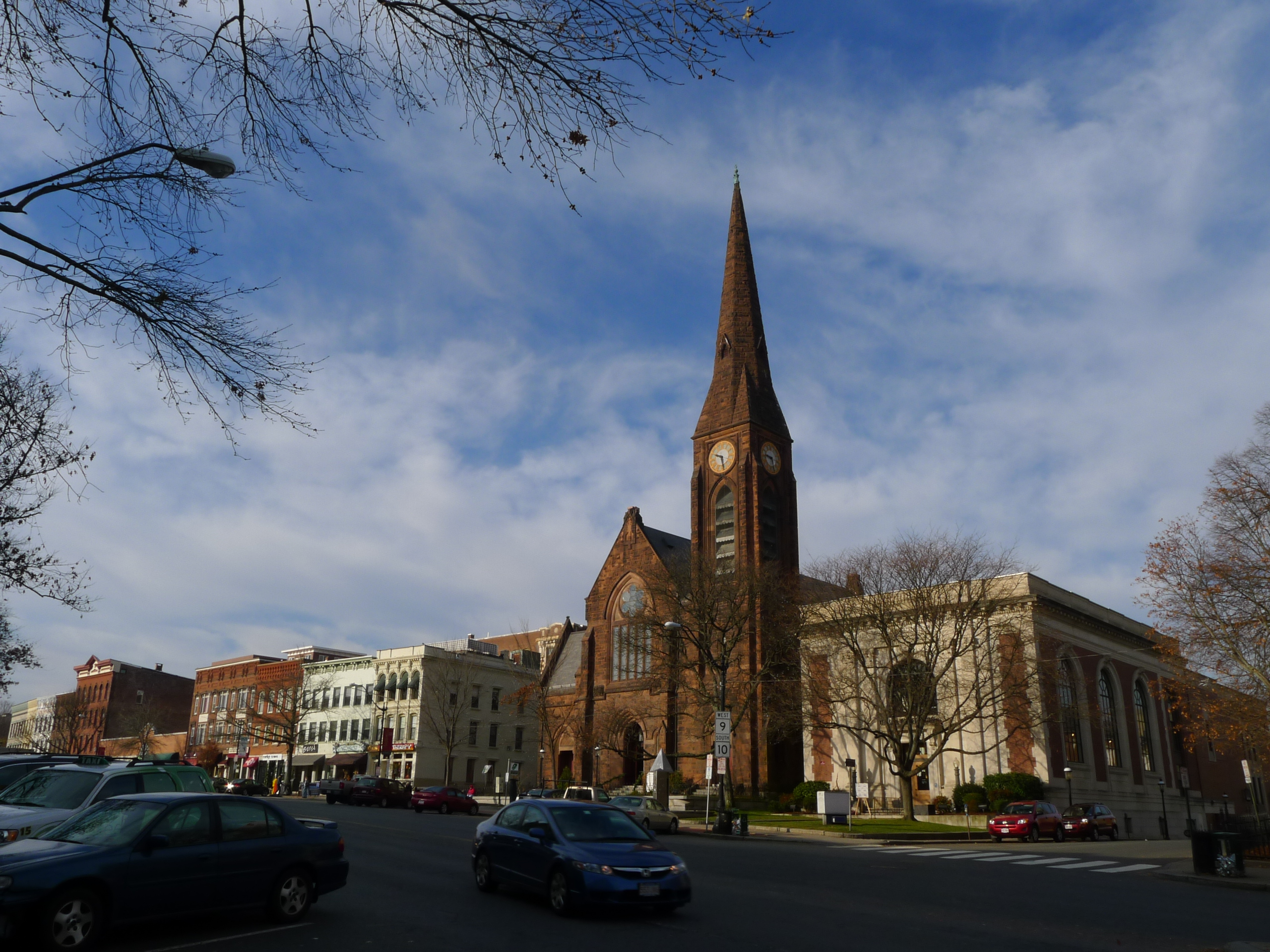
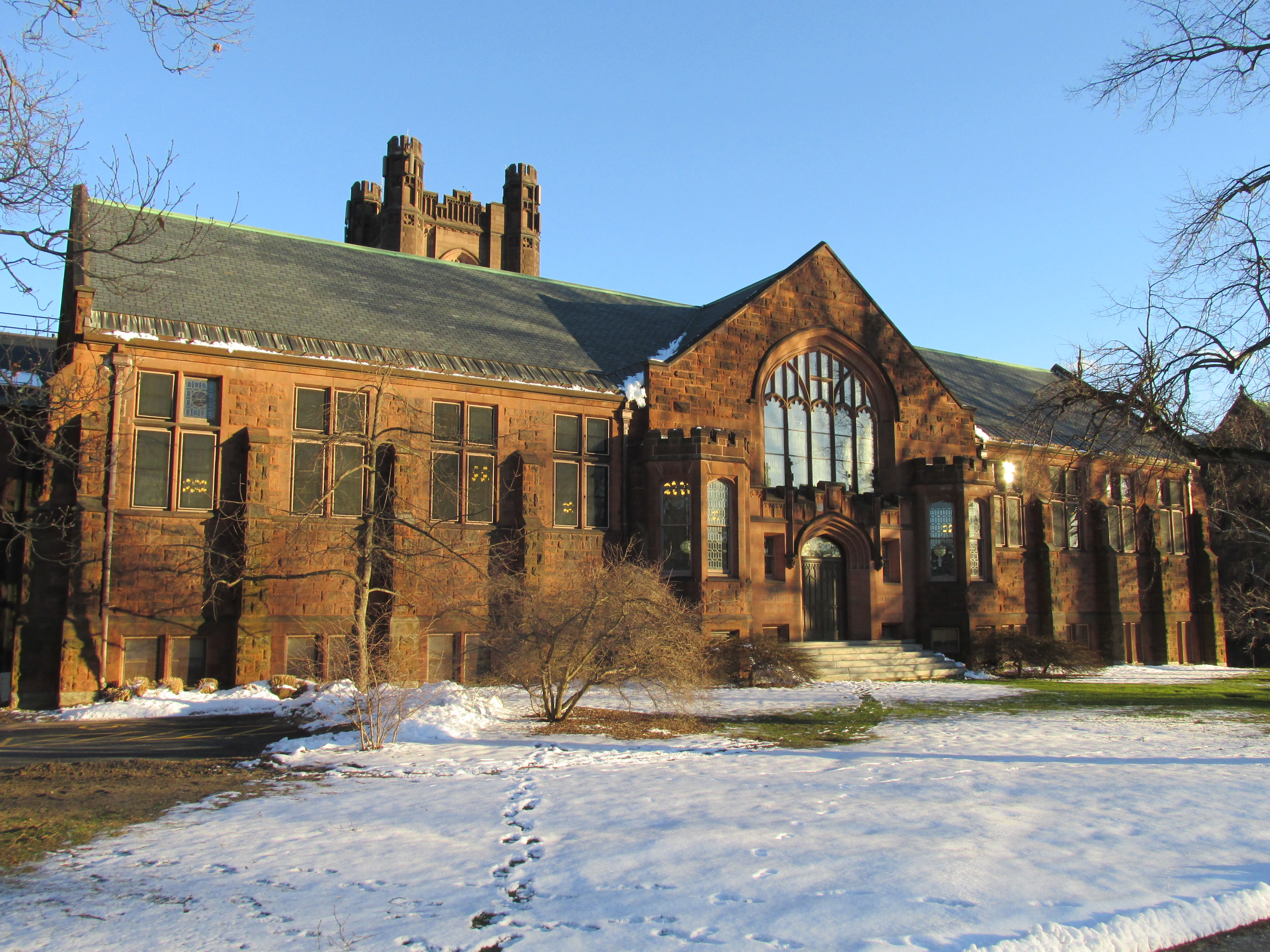
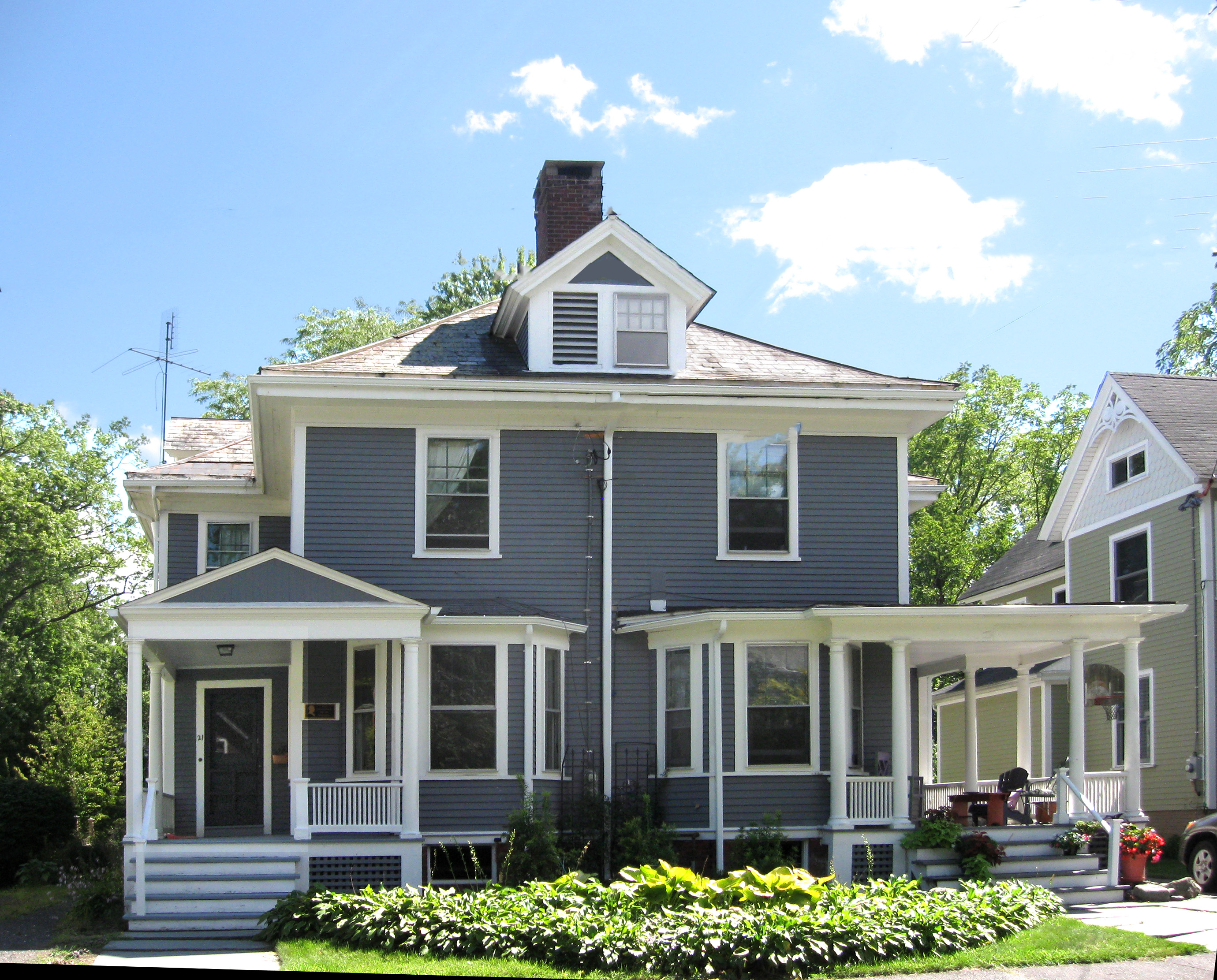
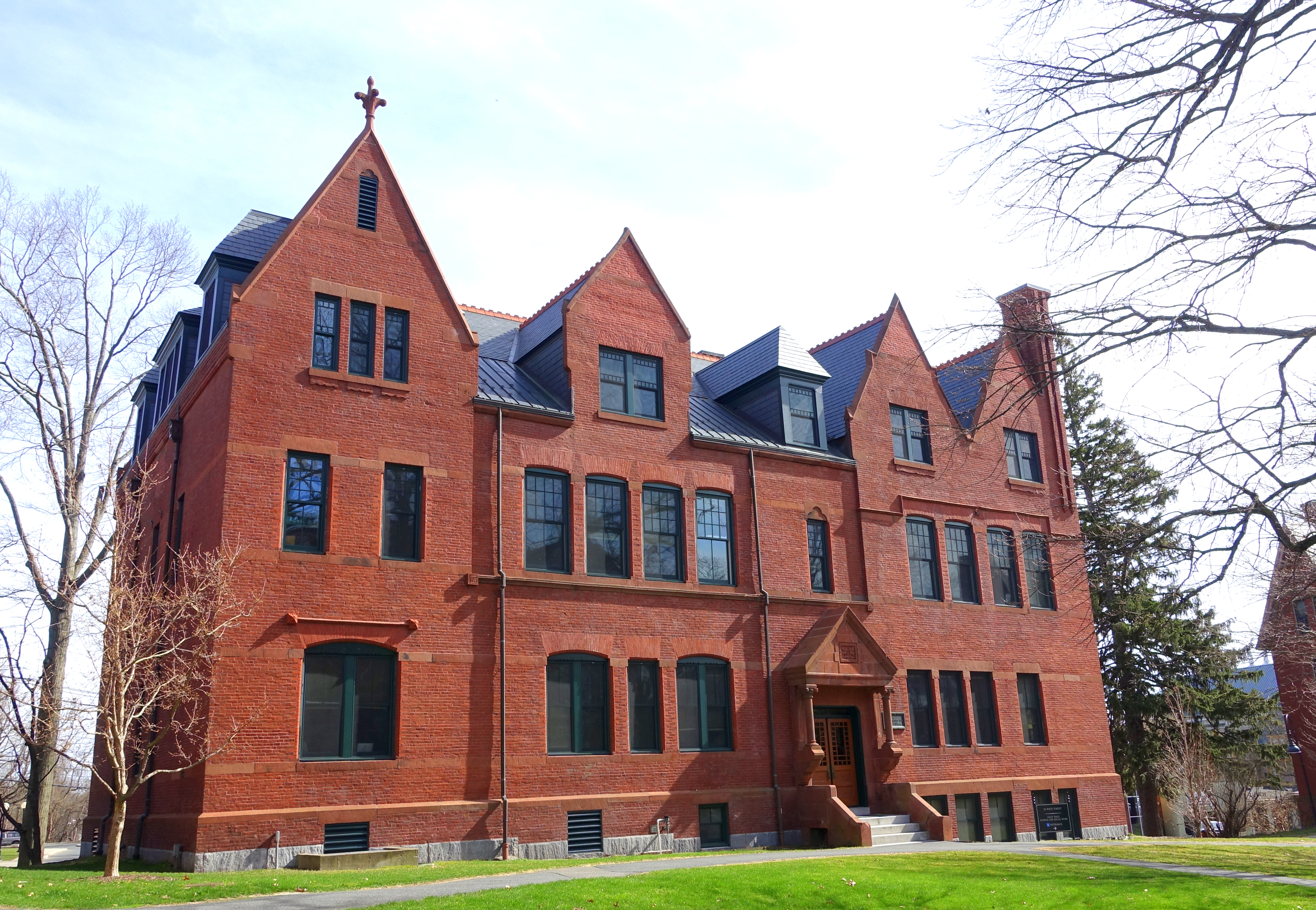
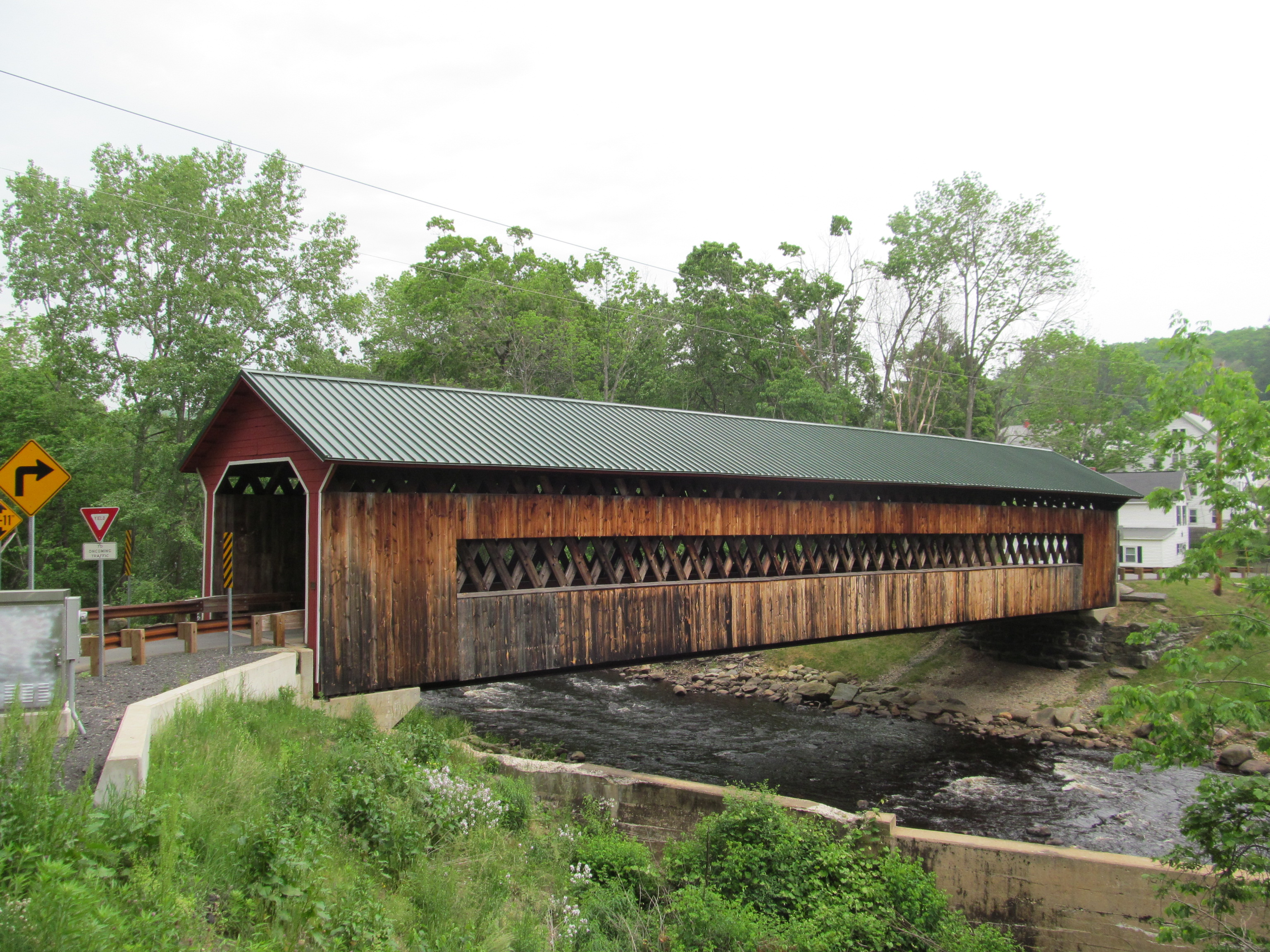
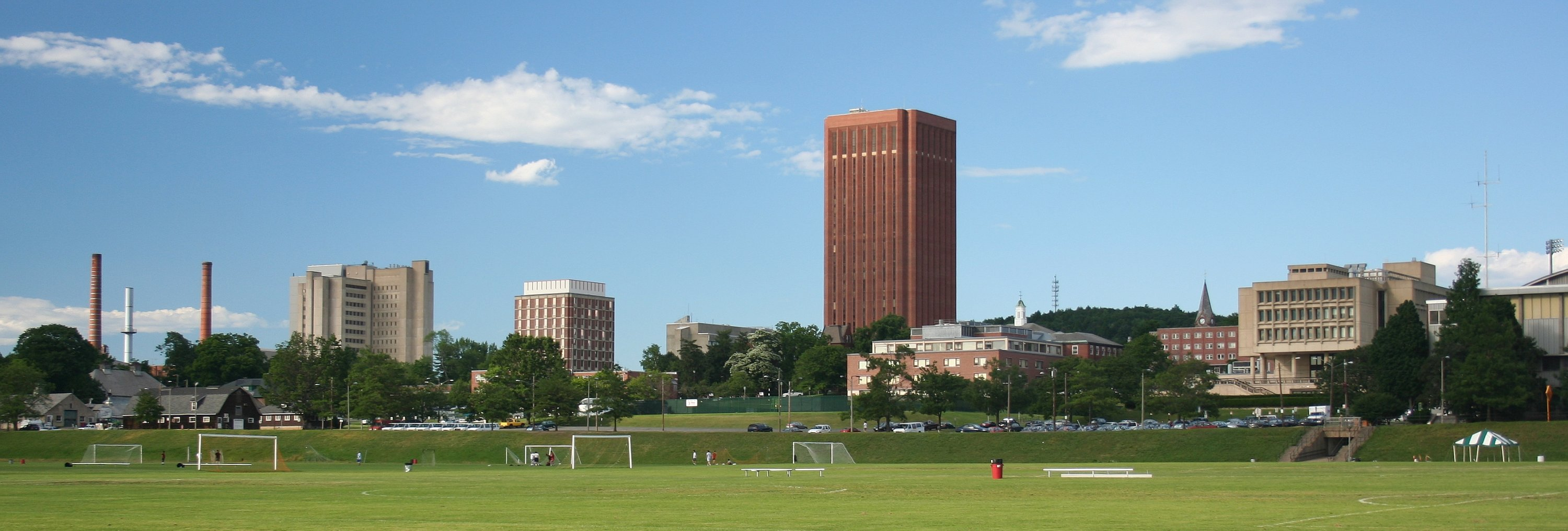
- Northampton Mount Holyoke College Calvin Coolidge House Smith College Ware-Hardwick Covered Bridge University of Massachusetts Amherst

- Seal

- Location within the U.S. state of Massachusetts
- Coordinates: 42.34°N 72.66°W
- Country: United States
- State: Massachusetts
- Founded: 1662
- Named for: Hampshire, England
- Seat: Northampton
- Largest town: Amherst

Area
  - Total: 545 sq mi (1,410 km^{2})
  - Land: 527 sq mi (1,360 km^{2})
  - Water: 18 sq mi (47 km^{2}) 3.3%

Population (2020)
  - Total: 162,308
  - Estimate (2025): 164,065 ▲
  - Density: 308/sq mi (119/km^{2})
- Time zone: UTC−5 (Eastern)
  - Summer (DST): UTC−4 (EDT)
- Congressional districts: 1st, 2nd
- Website: visithampshirecounty.com

Hampshire County is a historical and judicial county located in the U.S. state of Massachusetts. As of the 2020 census, the population was 162,308. Its most populous municipality is Amherst (due to seasonal student population; the largest year-round is Northampton, which is also its traditional county seat), and its largest town in terms of landmass is Belchertown. The county is named after the county Hampshire, in England. Hampshire County is part of the Springfield, MA Metropolitan Statistical Area. Together with Hampden County, Hampshire County municipalities belong to the Pioneer Valley Planning Commission.

== History ==
Hampshire County was constituted in 1662 from previously unorganized territory comprising the entire western part of Massachusetts Bay Colony. It included the original towns of Springfield, Northampton, and Hadley. The original Hampshire County also included territory that is now in modern-day Hampden County, Franklin County, and Berkshire County, as well as small parts of modern-day Worcester County. By 1683, three new towns (Westfield (now Southwick), Suffield, and Enfield) had been incorporated south of Springfield. These towns were partly or wholly in the modern state of Connecticut at the time of their incorporation. They resulted in a border dispute between the Connecticut Colony and Massachusetts Bay Colony.

In 1731, Worcester County was created, which included the original town of Brookfield (incorporated in 1718 as part of Hampshire County). More territory was lost to Worcester County in 1742 when the town of Western (now Warren) was created and added to Worcester County. Further territorial losses occurred in 1749 when the towns of Enfield, Somers (split off from Enfield in 1734), and Suffield unilaterally joined Connecticut Colony. In 1761, Berkshire County was partitioned from Hampshire County. In 1811, Franklin County was split off from the northern part of Hampshire, and in the following year, Hampden County was split off from its southern part.

Following the dissolution of the county government in 1999, county affairs were managed by the Hampshire Council of Governments. The council itself ceased operations in 2019, due to what an appraisal of the council termed a "fundamentally flawed, unsustainable operational model"; it had no inherent source of income and lacked a regional planning function.

== Politics ==
United States presidential election results for Hampshire County, Massachusetts
Year	Republican		Democratic		Third party(ies)	
Year	No.	%	No.	%	No.	%
1868	5,268	86.56%	818	13.44%	0	0.00%
1872	4,707	74.83%	1,583	25.17%	0	0.00%
1876	5,020	66.68%	2,507	33.30%	2	0.03%
1880	5,025	69.91%	2,042	28.41%	121	1.68%
1884	4,013	53.99%	2,730	36.73%	690	9.28%
1888	4,731	55.93%	3,403	40.23%	325	3.84%
1892	4,887	54.61%	3,678	41.10%	384	4.29%
1896	6,434	76.39%	1,608	19.09%	381	4.52%
1900	5,550	66.71%	2,392	28.75%	377	4.53%
1904	5,892	68.25%	2,292	26.55%	449	5.20%
1908	5,362	60.97%	2,612	29.70%	821	9.33%
1912	4,512	46.84%	3,088	32.06%	2,032	21.10%
1916	5,748	56.15%	4,202	41.05%	286	2.79%
1920	13,174	70.10%	5,305	28.23%	314	1.67%
1924	13,918	66.23%	5,037	23.97%	2,059	9.80%
1928	14,101	52.13%	12,695	46.93%	255	0.94%
1932	13,241	49.28%	12,332	45.90%	1,296	4.82%
1936	14,012	45.34%	15,412	49.87%	1,482	4.80%
1940	15,651	46.42%	17,823	52.86%	241	0.71%
1944	14,907	45.62%	17,676	54.09%	97	0.30%
1948	17,331	48.37%	18,012	50.27%	490	1.37%
1952	24,141	58.19%	17,247	41.57%	98	0.24%
1956	26,361	61.93%	16,119	37.87%	84	0.20%
1960	19,346	42.90%	25,667	56.92%	83	0.18%
1964	11,385	26.09%	32,058	73.45%	202	0.46%
1968	16,270	35.83%	26,666	58.72%	2,476	5.45%
1972	24,529	45.72%	28,572	53.25%	553	1.03%
1976	22,219	36.99%	34,947	58.17%	2,909	4.84%
1980	21,117	34.99%	27,611	45.75%	11,627	19.26%
1984	28,111	43.96%	35,597	55.67%	234	0.37%
1988	24,331	37.48%	39,834	61.36%	750	1.16%
1992	15,694	22.40%	37,879	54.06%	16,498	23.54%
1996	14,787	22.64%	41,844	64.07%	8,678	13.29%
2000	19,202	27.98%	38,543	56.16%	10,881	15.86%
2004	21,315	28.64%	51,680	69.44%	1,427	1.92%
2008	20,618	25.91%	56,869	71.47%	2,083	2.62%
2012	21,480	26.32%	57,359	70.27%	2,782	3.41%
2016	21,790	25.88%	55,367	65.76%	7,036	8.36%
2020	22,281	25.36%	63,362	72.12%	2,211	2.52%
2024	23,256	27.45%	58,617	69.19%	2,847	3.36%

== Geography ==
According to the U.S. Census Bureau, the county has a total area of 545 square miles (1,410 km^{2}), of which 527 square miles (1,360 km^{2}) is land and 18 square miles (47 km^{2}) (3.3%) is water.

Hampshire County is the middle section of the Pioneer Valley and the northern tip of the Hartford–Springfield Knowledge Corridor.

=== Adjacent counties ===
Hampshire County is the only county in Massachusetts surrounded in all directions by other counties of Massachusetts: all other counties in the state are adjacent to at least one other state or the open ocean.

- Franklin County (north)
- Worcester County (east)
- Hampden County (south)
- Berkshire County (west)

== Demographics ==
Historical population
Census	Pop.	Note	%±
1790	59,656		—
1800	72,432		21.4%
1810	76,275		5.3%
1820	26,487		−65.3%
1830	30,254		14.2%
1840	30,897		2.1%
1850	35,732		15.6%
1860	37,823		5.9%
1870	44,388		17.4%
1880	47,232		6.4%
1890	51,859		9.8%
1900	58,820		13.4%
1910	63,327		7.7%
1920	69,599		9.9%
1930	72,801		4.6%
1940	72,461		−0.5%
1950	87,594		20.9%
1960	103,229		17.8%
1970	123,981		20.1%
1980	138,813		12.0%
1990	146,568		5.6%
2000	152,251		3.9%
2010	158,080		3.8%
2020	162,308		2.7%
2025 (est.)	164,065	▲	1.1%
U.S. Decennial Census; 1790–1960 1900–1990; 1990–2000 2010–2018

=== 2020 census ===
As of the 2020 census, the county had a population of 162,308. Of the residents, 14.7% were under the age of 18 and 18.9% were 65 years of age or older; the median age was 38.3 years. For every 100 females there were 87.7 males, and for every 100 females age 18 and over there were 85.2 males. 71.5% of residents lived in urban areas and 28.5% lived in rural areas.

The racial makeup of the county was 80.2% White, 2.9% Black or African American, 0.3% American Indian and Alaska Native, 6.7% Asian, 0.0% Native Hawaiian and Pacific Islander, 2.6% from some other race, and 7.4% from two or more races. Hispanic or Latino residents of any race comprised 7.2% of the population.

There were 61,774 households in the county, of which 22.9% had children under the age of 18 living with them and 29.5% had a female householder with no spouse or partner present. About 31.9% of all households were made up of individuals and 14.2% had someone living alone who was 65 years of age or older.

There were 66,245 housing units, of which 6.7% were vacant. Among occupied housing units, 65.5% were owner-occupied and 34.5% were renter-occupied. The homeowner vacancy rate was 1.2% and the rental vacancy rate was 4.2%.

=== Racial and ethnic composition ===
Hampshire County, Massachusetts – Racial and ethnic composition Note: the US Census treats Hispanic/Latino as an ethnic category. This table excludes Latinos from the racial categories and assigns them to a separate category. Hispanics/Latinos may be of any race.
Race / Ethnicity (NH = Non-Hispanic)	Pop 1980	Pop 1990	Pop 2000	Pop 2010	Pop 2020	% 1980	% 1990	% 2000	% 2010	% 2020
White alone (NH)	133,423	135,451	136,319	136,249	127,578	96.12%	92.42%	89.54%	86.19%	78.60%
Black or African American alone (NH)	1,959	2,428	2,740	3,547	4,360	1.41%	1.66%	1.80%	2.24%	2.69%
Native American or Alaska Native alone (NH)	138	254	240	242	205	0.10%	0.17%	0.16%	0.15%	0.13%
Asian alone (NH)	1,133	4,401	5,158	7,123	10,740	0.82%	3.00%	3.39%	4.51%	6.62%
Native Hawaiian or Pacific Islander alone (NH)	x	x	67	41	56	x	x	0.04%	0.03%	0.03%
Other race alone (NH)	427	147	292	343	723	0.31%	0.10%	0.19%	0.22%	0.45%
Mixed race or Multiracial (NH)	x	x	2,223	3,080	7,024	x	x	1.46%	1.95%	4.33%
Hispanic or Latino (any race)	1,733	3,887	5,212	7,455	11,622	1.25%	2.65%	3.42%	4.72%	7.16%
Total	138,813	146,568	152,251	158,080	162,308	100.00%	100.00%	100.00%	100.00%	100.00%

=== 2010 census ===
At the 2010 census, there were 158,080 people, 58,702 households, and 34,480 families living in the county. The population density was 299.8 inhabitants per square mile (115.8/km^{2}). There were 62,603 housing units at an average density of 118.7 per square mile (45.8/km^{2}). The racial makeup of the county was 88.7% white, 4.5% Asian, 2.5% black or African American, 0.2% American Indian, 1.5% from other races, and 2.5% from two or more races. Those of Hispanic or Latino origin made up 4.7% of the population. The largest ancestry groups were:

- 22.2% Irish
- 14.4% French
- 14.3% Polish
- 14.2% English
- 10.8% German
- 9.1% Italian
- 7.1% French Canadian
- 3.2% Scottish
- 2.6% American
- 2.3% Puerto Rican
- 2.3% Scotch-Irish
- 2.1% Russian
- 1.7% Chinese
- 1.5% Swedish
- 1.4% Portuguese
- 1.0% Lithuanian
- 1.0% Dutch

Of the 58,702 households, 26.4% had children under the age of 18 living with them, 44.8% were married couples living together, 10.3% had a female householder with no husband present, 41.3% were non-families, and 29.7% of households were made up of individuals. The average household size was 2.34 and the average family size was 2.89. The median age was 36.6 years.

The median household income was $59,505 and the median family income was $80,891. Males had a median income of $52,686 versus $43,219 for females. The per capita income for the county was $28,367. About 6.2% of families and 11.7% of the population were below the poverty line, including 11.8% of those under age 18 and 7.8% of those age 65 or over.

=== 2000 census ===
At the 2000 census there were 152,251 people, 55,991 households, and 33,818 families living in the county. The population density was 288 inhabitants per square mile (111/km^{2}). There were 58,644 housing units at an average density of 111 per square mile (43/km^{2}). The racial makeup of the county was 91.10% White, 1.96% Black or African American, 0.19% Native American, 3.40% Asian, 0.05% Pacific Islander, 1.50% from other races, and 1.80% from two or more races. 3.42% of the population were Hispanic or Latino of any race. 14.7% were of Irish, 12.8% Polish, 9.6% English, 9.5% French, 8.5% French Canadian, 6.9% Italian and 6.4% German ancestry, 88.8% spoke English, 3.4% Spanish, 1.7% French and 1.4% Polish as their first language. Of the 55,991 households 28.20% had children under the age of 18 living with them, 47.40% were married couples living together, 9.80% had a female householder with no husband present, and 39.60% were non-families. 28.60% of households were one person and 10.20% were one person aged 65 or older. The average household size was 2.39 and the average family size was 2.96.

The age distribution was 19.60% under the age of 18, 19.30% from 18 to 24, 26.80% from 25 to 44, 22.20% from 45 to 64, and 12.00% 65 or older. The median age was 34 years. For every 100 females, there were 87.40 males. For every 100 females age 18 and over, there were 83.90 males.

The median household income was $46,098 and the median family income was $57,480. Males had a median income of $39,327 versus $30,362 for females. The per capita income for the county was $21,685. About 5.10% of families and 9.40% of the population were below the poverty line, including 8.20% of those under age 18 and 6.70% of those age 65 or over.

== Education ==
Hampshire County is home to what are known as the "Five Colleges", which include the University of Massachusetts flagship campus and four well-known private colleges:

- Amherst College, Amherst
- Hampshire College, Amherst
- Mount Holyoke College, South Hadley
- Smith College, Northampton
- University of Massachusetts Amherst

The Five College Consortium provides course cross-registration between the schools and funds free bus service, provided by Pioneer Valley Transit Authority, between the campuses.

== Communities ==
=== Cities ===
- Easthampton
- Northampton (historic county seat)
- Amherst

=== Towns ===
- Belchertown
- Chesterfield
- Cummington
- Goshen
- Granby
- Hadley
- Hatfield
- Huntington
- Middlefield
- Pelham
- Plainfield
- South Hadley
- Southampton
- Ware
- Westhampton
- Williamsburg
- Worthington

=== Census-designated places ===
- Belchertown
- Granby
- Hatfield
- Huntington
- Ware

=== Other unincorporated communities ===
- Amherst Center
- Cushman
- Florence
- Haydenville
- Leeds
- Mount Tom
- North Amherst
- Ringville
- South Amherst
- South Hadley Falls

=== Former towns ===
The following towns were disincorporated for the creation of the Quabbin Reservoir:

- Dana
- Enfield
- Greenwich
- Prescott

== Transportation ==
=== Highways ===
Hampshire County is served by one Interstate Highway, Interstate 91, which runs north–south along the Connecticut River valley through Northampton and Hatfield. Three U.S. Routes also pass through the county: U.S. Route 5 parallels I-91 along the river, U.S. Route 20 crosses the southwestern corner through Huntington, and U.S. Route 202 travels north–south through the eastern towns of South Hadley, Granby, Belchertown, and Pelham.

The primary east–west artery across the county is Massachusetts Route 9, connecting the hilltowns in the west to Northampton, Hadley, Amherst, Belchertown, and Ware. Other major north–south state routes include Massachusetts Route 10, Massachusetts Route 21, Massachusetts Route 32, Massachusetts Route 47, Massachusetts Route 63, Massachusetts Route 112, Massachusetts Route 116, Massachusetts Route 141, and Massachusetts Route 181. Additional east–west and local state routes serving the county include Massachusetts Route 8A, Massachusetts Route 66, and Massachusetts Route 143.

== See also ==
- List of Massachusetts locations by per capita income
- List of counties in Massachusetts
- National Register of Historic Places listings in Hampshire County, Massachusetts
- Registry of Deeds (Massachusetts)
- Tofu Curtain
- USS Hampshire County (LST-819)
