= Worthington, Massachusetts =

- Town
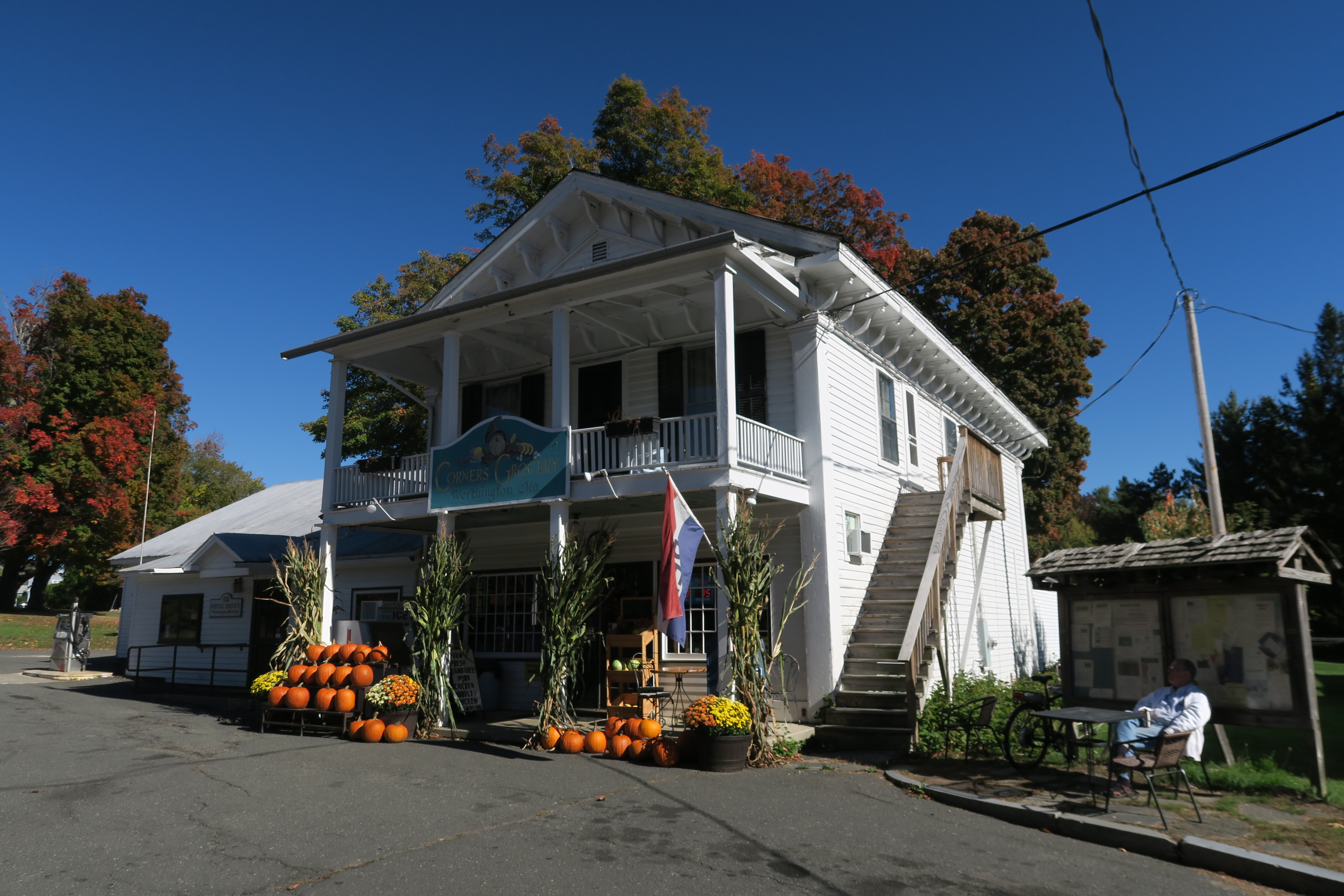
- Corners Grocery

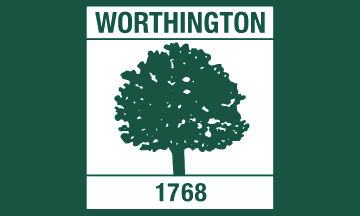
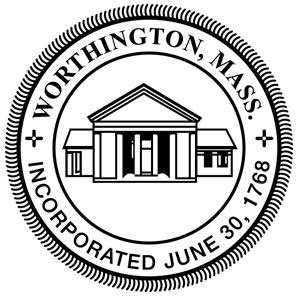
- Flag Seal

- Location in Hampshire County in Massachusetts
- Coordinates: 42°23′50″N 72°56′10″W
- Country: United States
- State: Massachusetts
- County: Hampshire
- Settled: 1764
- Incorporated: 1768

Government
  - Type: Open town meeting

Area
  - Total: 32.1 sq mi (83.1 km^{2})
  - Land: 31.9 sq mi (82.7 km^{2})
  - Water: 0.15 sq mi (0.4 km^{2})
- Elevation: 1,434 ft (437 m)

Population (2020)
  - Total: 1,193
  - Density: 37.4/sq mi (14.4/km^{2})
- Time zone: UTC−5 (Eastern)
  - Summer (DST): UTC−4 (Eastern)
- ZIP Code: 01098
- Area code: 413
- FIPS code: 25-82175
- GNIS feature ID: 0618212
- Website: www.worthington-ma.us

Worthington is a town in Hampshire County, Massachusetts, United States. The population was 1,193 at the 2020 census, up from 1,156 at the 2010 census. It is part of the Springfield, Massachusetts Metropolitan Statistical Area.

Worthington is discussed by name in the Aaron Lewis song "Massachusetts" and referenced by the population size in "Country Boy". Both songs are on the album Town Line, released in 2011.

== History ==
Worthington was first settled in 1764 and was officially incorporated in 1768. The town's officials had settled for new land after the settling of Northampton in 1654. In the 1760s, the wilderness that became Worthington was largely unpopulated. The 1840s and 1850s saw the arrival of a new form of transportation: railways. An effort to bring a line through Worthington failed. Although a train station was built in Huntington, many Worthington families began selling their farms and moving to western New York State, Ohio and further west in search of cheap land. By the 1860s, Worthington's population had declined to 925. These were years marked by deep conflict and rapid technological change.

The population continued to decline—818 in 1875, 763 in 1885, 569 in 1910—yet in these same decades, many present-day town institutions were established. In 1887, the second Congregational Church burned down. The third and current church, including a steeple, bells, organ, and new stained glass windows, was built on the same site and dedicated in 1888. While the permanent population of farmers and small manufacturers declined steadily, Worthington gradually gained a reputation as a summer resort. A casino on Buffington Hill Road, a hotel, several boarding houses, and many summer homes brought many visitors as well as income to the town. The maple sugaring industry expanded into a commercial enterprise during this period. Worthington's population sagged during the 1930s and 40s, reaching its low point of 363 in 1945. With fewer people, Worthington's one-room schools closed, post offices were consolidated, and The Grange was forced to merge with its neighbors. During the winter of 1931, the Lafayette Inn burned to the ground and was never rebuilt.

During the 1950s and 1960s, the town began to grow again, a reflection of improved roads. In August 1949, a special town meeting appropriated $6,800 to build a new fire house, which was completed the following year. The Palettes and Trowels Club met for the first time in 1950 and became a haven for several Worthington artists. The town's bicentennial celebration in 1968 was held from June 29 to July 6; events included a parade, an antique fair, an exhibit of photographs, a tour of Worthington homes, a play entitled "Bicentennial Quilting Party", and a beard-growing contest. The late 1960s and early 1970s saw more population growth. During the 1980s, the Hilltown Artisans Guild was established.

== Geography ==
Worthington is in western Hampshire County, bordering the Berkshires. It is bordered by Cummington to the north, Chesterfield to the east, Huntington to the southeast, Chester in Hampden County to the south, Middlefield to the southwest, and Peru in Berkshire County to the west. Worthington Center and Worthington Corners are two neighboring villages near the center of the town, while Ringville and South Worthington are in the southeast and West Worthington is in the northwest.

Massachusetts Route 112 crosses the town, leading north to Cummington and south to Huntington. Massachusetts Route 143 follows Route 112 briefly northeast from Worthington Corners but leads east to Chesterfield and Williamsburg, and west to Peru and Hinsdale.

According to the United States Census Bureau, Worthington has a total area of 32.1 square miles (83.1 km^{2}), of which 31.9 square miles (82.7 km^{2}) are land and 0.2 square miles (0.4 km^{2}), or 0.46%, are water. The town is within the Westfield River watershed, with the Middle Branch of the Westfield River flowing through the western side of the town.

=== Climate ===
Climate data for Worthington, Massachusetts, 1991–2020 normals: 1285ft (392m)
Month	Jan	Feb	Mar	Apr	May	Jun	Jul	Aug	Sep	Oct	Nov	Dec	Year
Record high °F (°C)	65 (18)	73 (23)	81 (27)	89 (32)	91 (33)	93 (34)	94 (34)	93 (34)	91 (33)	84 (29)	76 (24)	69 (21)	94 (34)
Mean maximum °F (°C)	53.5 (11.9)	55.1 (12.8)	63.9 (17.7)	78.2 (25.7)	84.8 (29.3)	87.8 (31.0)	88.9 (31.6)	87.6 (30.9)	84.9 (29.4)	76.2 (24.6)	66.6 (19.2)	56.5 (13.6)	90.3 (32.4)
Mean daily maximum °F (°C)	31.5 (−0.3)	34.6 (1.4)	42.5 (5.8)	55.4 (13.0)	66.7 (19.3)	74.7 (23.7)	79.6 (26.4)	78.1 (25.6)	71.4 (21.9)	59.1 (15.1)	47.0 (8.3)	36.4 (2.4)	56.4 (13.6)
Daily mean °F (°C)	21.7 (−5.7)	23.6 (−4.7)	31.6 (−0.2)	43.5 (6.4)	54.6 (12.6)	63.1 (17.3)	67.9 (19.9)	66.3 (19.1)	59.2 (15.1)	47.6 (8.7)	37.1 (2.8)	27.6 (−2.4)	45.3 (7.4)
Mean daily minimum °F (°C)	11.9 (−11.2)	12.7 (−10.7)	20.6 (−6.3)	31.6 (−0.2)	42.5 (5.8)	51.5 (10.8)	56.3 (13.5)	54.5 (12.5)	47.0 (8.3)	36.2 (2.3)	27.2 (−2.7)	18.8 (−7.3)	34.2 (1.2)
Mean minimum °F (°C)	−7.6 (−22.0)	−5.2 (−20.7)	2.0 (−16.7)	20.2 (−6.6)	28.8 (−1.8)	37.7 (3.2)	46.6 (8.1)	43.7 (6.5)	33.3 (0.7)	23.3 (−4.8)	12.0 (−11.1)	2.7 (−16.3)	−9.1 (−22.8)
Record low °F (°C)	−16 (−27)	−19 (−28)	−13 (−25)	8 (−13)	22 (−6)	32 (0)	41 (5)	38 (3)	25 (−4)	16 (−9)	−4 (−20)	−9 (−23)	−19 (−28)
Average precipitation inches (mm)	3.95 (100)	3.56 (90)	4.25 (108)	4.29 (109)	4.20 (107)	5.12 (130)	4.57 (116)	4.46 (113)	4.78 (121)	5.59 (142)	4.10 (104)	5.22 (133)	54.09 (1,373)
Average snowfall inches (cm)	19.30 (49.0)	18.20 (46.2)	13.80 (35.1)	4.00 (10.2)	0.10 (0.25)	0.00 (0.00)	0.00 (0.00)	0.00 (0.00)	0.00 (0.00)	0.40 (1.0)	4.60 (11.7)	16.70 (42.4)	77.1 (195.85)
Source 1: NOAA
Source 2: XMACIS (temp records & monthly max/mins)

== Demographics ==
Historical population
Year	Pop.	±%
1790	1,116	—
1850	1,134	+1.6%
1860	1,041	−8.2%
1870	860	−17.4%
1880	758	−11.9%
1890	714	−5.8%
1900	675	−5.5%
1910	569	−15.7%
1920	409	−28.1%
1930	486	+18.8%
1940	471	−3.1%
1950	462	−1.9%
1960	597	+29.2%
1970	712	+19.3%
1980	932	+30.9%
1990	1,156	+24.0%
2000	1,270	+9.9%
2010	1,156	−9.0%
2020	1,193	+3.2%
2022*	1,183	−0.8%
* = population estimate. Source: United States census records and Population Estimates Program data.

At the 2000 census, there were 1,270 people, 503 households and 363 families living in the town. The population density was 39.6 inhabitants per square mile (15.3/km^{2}). There were 582 housing units at an average density of 18.2 per square mile (7.0/km^{2}). The racial makeup of the town was 98.27% White, 0.31% African American, 0.08% Native American, 0.24% Asian, and 1.10% from two or more races. Hispanic or Latino of any race were 1.02% of the population.

There were 503 households, of which 31.8% had children under the age of 18 living with them, 60.8% were married couples living together, 7.6% had a female householder with no husband present, and 27.8% were non-families. Of all households, 21.3% were made up of individuals, and 8.0% had someone living alone who was 65 years of age or older. The average household size was 2.52 and the average family size was 2.96.

Of the population, 24.5% were under the age of 18, 6.3% from 18 to 24, 26.8% from 25 to 44, 31.4% from 45 to 64, and 11.0% who were 65 years of age or older. The median age was 42 years. For every 100 females, there were 98.1 males. For every 100 females age 18 and over, there were 92.6 males.

The median household income was $53,047 and the median family income was $60,132. Males had a median income of $42,500 compared with $26,438 for females. The per capita income for the town was $24,190. About 1.5% of families and 3.5% of the population were below the poverty line, including 2.0% of those under age 18 and 1.4% of those age 65 or over.

== In popular culture ==
Worthington is discussed by name in the Aaron Lewis song "Massachusetts" and referenced by the population size in "Country Boy". Both songs are on the album Town Line, released in 2011.

So I just pass the sign that welcomes me to Worthington
Established long before this country came to be
A place that hasn't really changed with time
The way this country that I love, it used to be

— Aaron Lewis, "Massachusetts"

The song references the fact that the town of Worthington pre-existed the United States, being settled some twelve years before the end of the Revolutionary War.

Composer Rolande Maxwell Young wrote the "Worthington Bicentennial March" in honor of the town's bicentennial in the 1960s.

== Maple syrup and sugar houses ==
Worthington is home to many agricultural endeavors, including the manufacturing of maple syrup, with three sugar houses open nearly year-round.

== Notable people ==
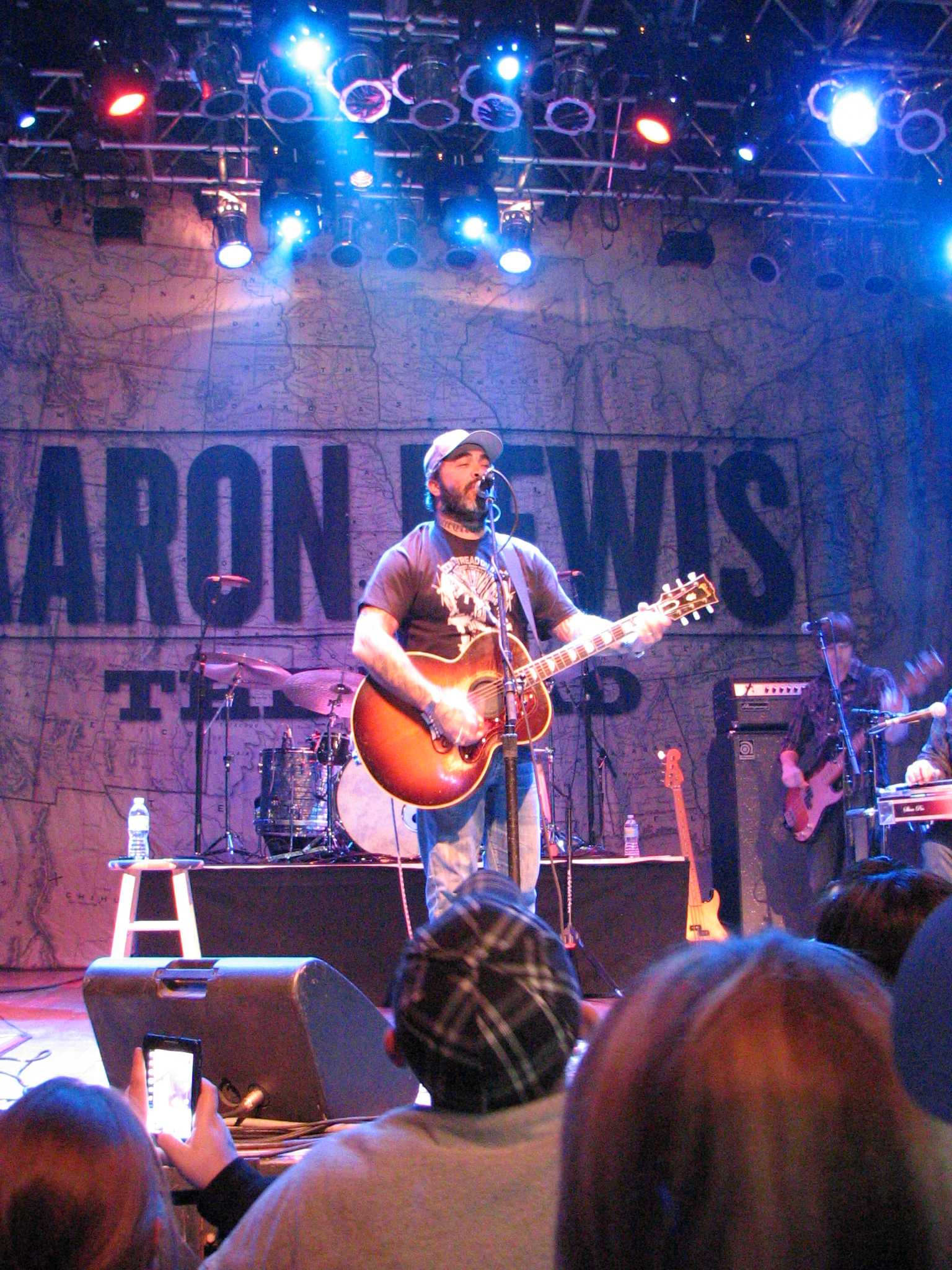
Aaron Lewis is a long-time Worthington resident.

- Russell Conwell (1843–1925), founder of Temple University
- Aaron Lewis (born 1972), lead singer of Staind and current country music singer
- Alfred P. Stone (1813–1865), US congressman from Ohio

== See also ==
- Hampshire Regional High School
