= Westfield River =

River in Massachusetts, United States

Westfield River Agawam River (archaic)
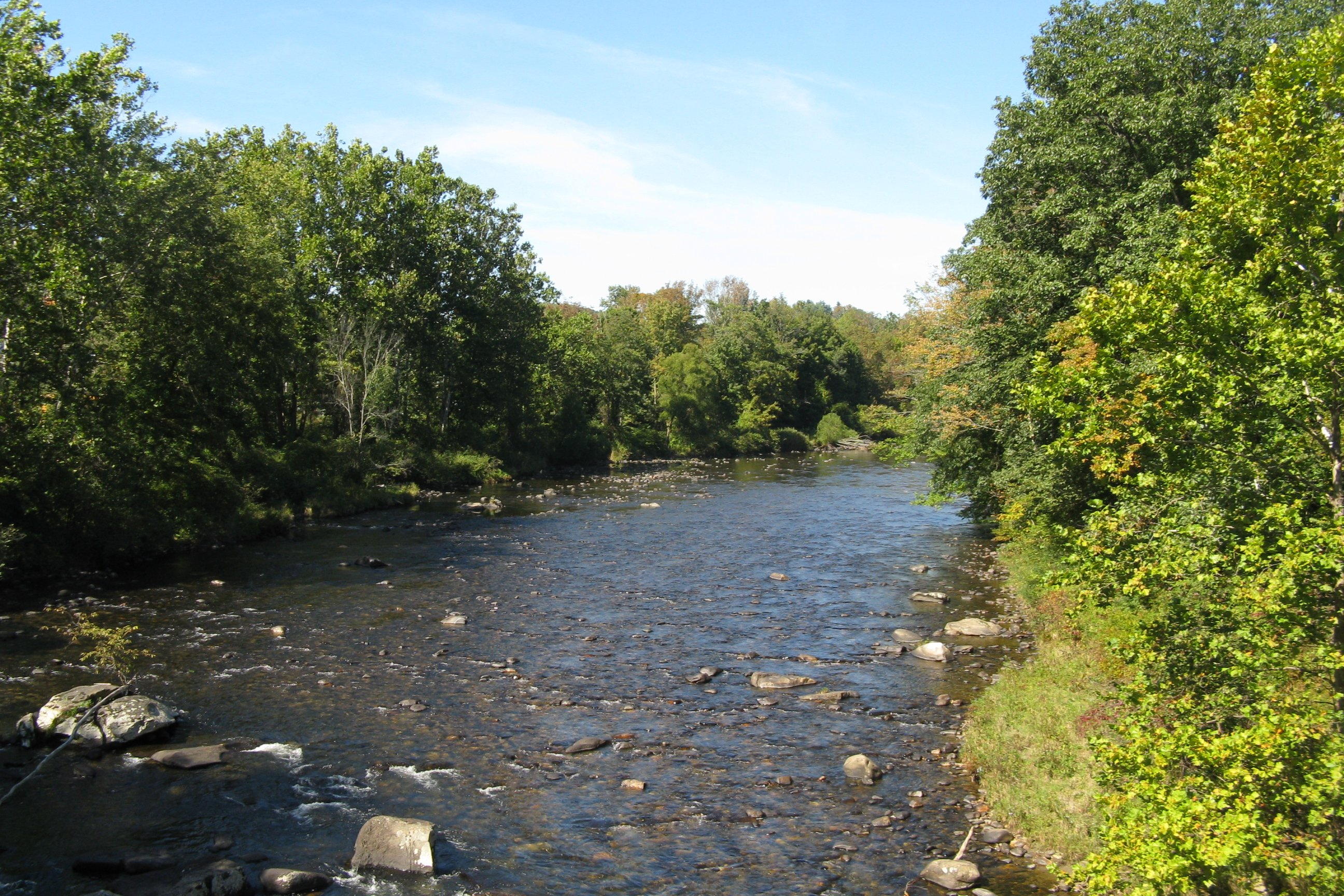
- Westfield River in Huntington (the "Main Stem")

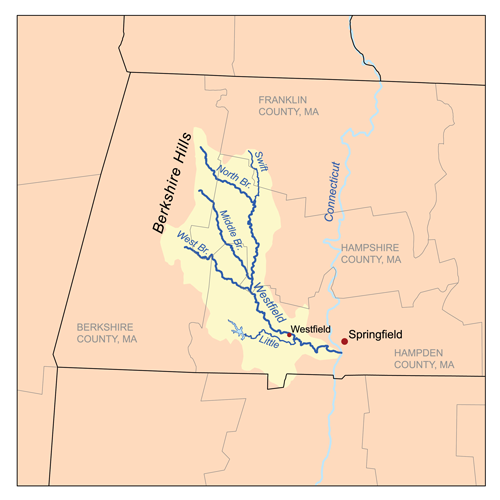
- The Westfield River and its major tributaries

Location
- Country: United States
- State: Massachusetts
- Region: Metropolitan Springfield
- District: Hampden County, Massachusetts
- Municipality: Westfield, Massachusetts

Physical characteristics
- Source: North Branch Westfield River
  - location: Berkshires
  - coordinates: 42°34′09″N 73°01′54″W
  - elevation: 1,734 ft (529 m)
- Source confluence: debouch of the Swift River
  - coordinates: 42°26′39″N 72°51′31″W
  - elevation: 922 ft (281 m)
- Mouth: Connecticut River
  - coordinates: 42°05′03″N 72°35′08″W
  - elevation: 39 ft (12 m)
- Length: 78.1 mi (125.7 km)
- Basin size: 517 sq mi (1,340 km^{2})

Basin features
- Tributaries
  - left: Swift River; Dead Branch (East Branch)
  - right: Middle Branch; West Branch; Little River

National Wild and Scenic River
- Type: Wild, Scenic, Recreational
- Designated: November 2, 1993

The Westfield River is a major tributary of the Connecticut River located in the Berkshires and Pioneer Valley regions of western Massachusetts. With four major tributary branches that converge west of the city of Westfield, it flows 78.1 miles (125.7 km) (measured from the source of its North Branch) before its confluence with the Connecticut River at Agawam, across from the city of Springfield's Metro Center district. Known for its whitewater rapids and scenery, the Westfield River provides over 50 miles (80 km) of whitewater canoeing and kayaking, in addition to one of the largest roadless wilderness areas remaining in the Commonwealth.

The Westfield River is the Connecticut River's longest tributary in Massachusetts, although the Chicopee River's basin is much larger, and contributes more water to the Connecticut. The Connecticut's northern tributary, the Deerfield River, is nearly as long as the Westfield, being only 2.1 miles (3.4 km) shorter.

During the mid-20th century, the Westfield River was so polluted that it would change color based on the nature of the contaminant. Today, the river is clean enough for swimming. It is a state and locally managed river featuring native trout fishing and rugged mountain scenery in the context of a historical mill town settlement (at Westfield).

== History ==
On its initial discovery by Massachusetts Bay Colony explorers John Cable and John Woodcock in 1635, the area stretching from the Westfield River's confluence with the Connecticut River to Westfield itself—which, the next year, would all be encompassed in the settlement that came to be known as Springfield—was named the "Agawam River", after the name of the Native American people then occupying the area. Historical literature often refers to Springfield as sitting at the confluence of the Connecticut River with the western Agawam River and eastern Chicopee River. This "Agawam River" is now known as the Westfield River, and should not be confused with the Agawam River in southeastern Massachusetts, which was named in tribute to Springfield's tribe of Native Americans.

== Course and branches ==
The Westfield River runs for a total of 78.1 miles (125.7 km). Rising in the Berkshire Hills region of Massachusetts, it flows southeastwardly to join the Connecticut River at Agawam—directly across from Springfield's Metro Center (downtown).

The Westfield River has a 497-square-mile (1,290 km^{2}) drainage area that includes three named branches, which join in Huntington to form the Westfield River's main stem, which flows through Russell into Westfield. The branches are the North Branch (sometimes called the East Branch), which rises in the town of Savoy and flows southeast through Windsor, Cummington, and Chesterfield; the Middle Branch, which rises in the town of Peru and flows southeast through Worthington, Middlefield, and Chester; and the West Branch, which has its origins in Washington and Becket, then flows east through Chester.

The three branches converge in the town of Huntington: the Middle and North Branch (or "East Branch") merge near the village of Goss Heights, 2 miles (3 km) north of their junction with the West Branch (designated a National Wild and Scenic river) at Huntington village. From Huntington, the main stem of the Westfield River flows through Russell and Westfield, then forms the boundary between West Springfield and Agawam before ending at the Connecticut River.

Every April, the Westfield River in Huntington is the home of the Westfield River Whitewater Races, the oldest continuously run whitewater race in the United States.

Portions of the river's watershed have been designated the Westfield Creek Wild and Scenic River, and form part of the National Wild and Scenic Rivers System.

== Hydropower facilities and dams ==
From the mouth heading upstream, the first dam is the West Springfield Dam, which creates a reservoir north of Robinson State Park. This powers two hydropower turbines owned by A & D Hydro, rated at 900 and 466 kW. The 18-foot-high stone and concrete dam includes a 50-foot-wide power canal, and was constructed in 1836.

The second dam (actually two dams, north and south, with an island in the middle) is in the village of Woronoco in the town of Russell. Woronoco hydro station, owned by Eagle Creek Renewable Energy, is at Salmon Falls, also known as Woronoco Falls. It has three Francis turbines, rated for a total of 2.7 MW. These falls were first dammed in the 1870s by the Woronoco Paper Company, later merged with the Strathmore Paper Company. The current dams were constructed in 1938 and 1950 by Strathmore; the paper mills operated until 1999.

The third dam is at the Indian River Power Supply plant on Station Road in Russell. The modern hydroelectric plant is also owned by Eagle Creek Renewable Energy, and is rated at 1.4 MW, with two Francis turbines. The dam and plant were originally constructed by the Westfield River Paper Company in 1909.

The fourth dam is Crescent Dam, located in the Crescent Mills neighborhood of Russell at mile 24 of the river. This site was formerly a Chapin and Gould Paper Company mill (later known as Texon). The Texon Hydroelectric Project at the site is rated at 1.5 MW, and is owned by Gravity Renewables.

The fifth dam is the Knightville Dam in Huntington, Massachusetts. After the 1936 flood on the Westfield and Connecticut Rivers, it was constructed by the Army Corps of Engineers from August 1939 to December 1941 for $3.3 million. It is only used for flood control and does not normally impound a reservoir. Construction required relocation of Route 112 and a cemetery. Thirty-three homes were demolished, two were moved, and a gas station and store were obliterated. The dam is credited with averting hundreds of millions of dollars in downstream flood damages.
