= Sunderland, Massachusetts =

- Town
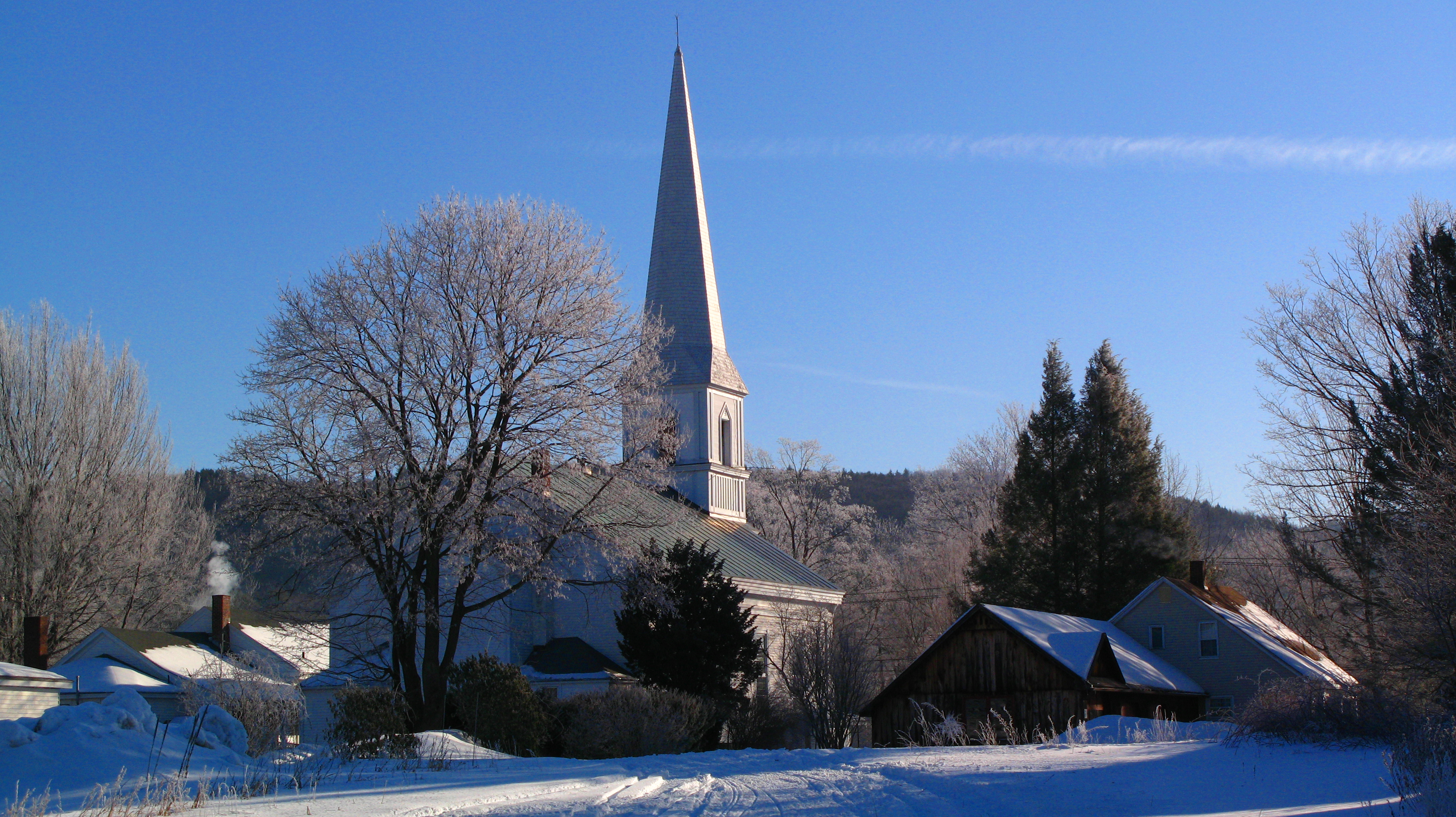
- First Congregational of Sunderland, organized in 1718

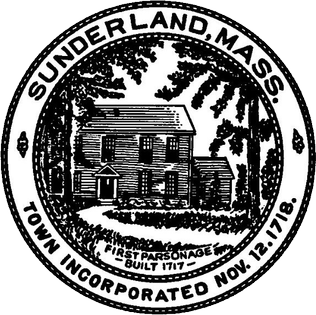
- Seal

- Location in Franklin County in Massachusetts
- Coordinates: 42°28′0″N 72°34′45″W
- Country: United States
- State: Massachusetts
- County: Franklin
- Settled: 1713
- Incorporated: November 12, 1718

Government
  - Type: Open town meeting

Area
  - Total: 14.7 sq mi (38.2 km^{2})
  - Land: 14.2 sq mi (36.9 km^{2})
  - Water: 0.50 sq mi (1.3 km^{2})
- Elevation: 748 ft (228 m)

Population (2020)
  - Total: 3,663
  - Density: 257/sq mi (99.3/km^{2})
- Time zone: UTC-5 (Eastern)
  - Summer (DST): UTC-4 (Eastern)
- ZIP Code: 01375
- Area code: 413
- FIPS code: 25-68400
- GNIS feature ID: 0618176
- Website: www.townofsunderland.us

Sunderland is a town in Franklin County, Massachusetts, United States, part of the Pioneer Valley. The population was 3,663 at the 2020 census. It is part of the Springfield, Massachusetts Metropolitan Statistical Area.

Sunderland was first settled in 1713 and was officially incorporated in 1718. It was first known as Swampfield, a name which is now honored by Swampfield Road, but the name was changed to attract more residents. It was renamed in honor of Charles Spencer, the Earl of Sunderland. Historically, the land was largely used for farming. Before the incorporation of Leverett in 1774, that town was a part of Sunderland's territory.

== Geography and transportation ==
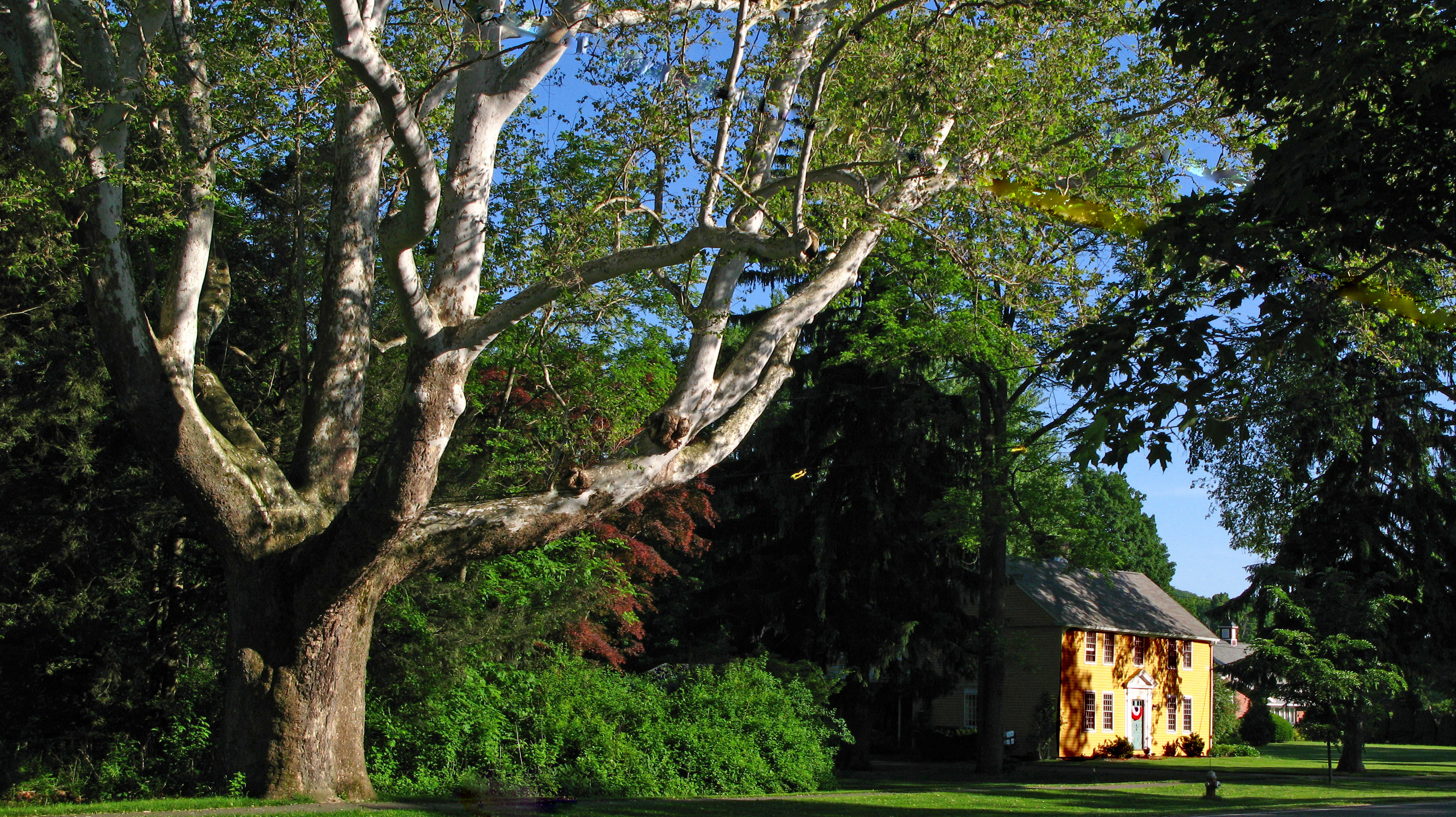
The Buttonball Tree is an American sycamore located on N Main St. in Sunderland

According to the United States Census Bureau, the town has a total area of 14.7 square miles (38.2 km^{2}), of which 14.2 square miles (36.9 km^{2}) is land and 0.50 square miles (1.3 km^{2}), or 3.53%, is water. Sunderland is located in the Pioneer Valley on the east bank of the Connecticut River, which drains the town. Mount Toby, a prominent conglomerate mountain with a firetower lookout, stands at the east border of the town and is traversed by the 47-mile (76 km) Robert Frost Trail. The mountain, surrounded by Mount Toby State Forest, is known for its waterfalls, scenic vista, and biologically diverse ecosystem. Sunderland is home to the Buttonball Tree, an American sycamore famous for its size and age.

Sunderland lies on the southern edge of Franklin County, north of Hampshire County. Sunderland is bordered by Montague to the north, Leverett to the east, Amherst and Hadley to the south, and Whately and Deerfield to the west. (Because of the river, there is no direct access between Sunderland and Whately.) From its town center just east of the Connecticut River, Sunderland is 10 miles (16 km) south of the county seat of Greenfield, 28 miles (45 km) north of Springfield, and 90 miles (140 km) west of Boston. Most of the town's population lies in the western part of town, along the river, though there is a small village north of Mount Toby.

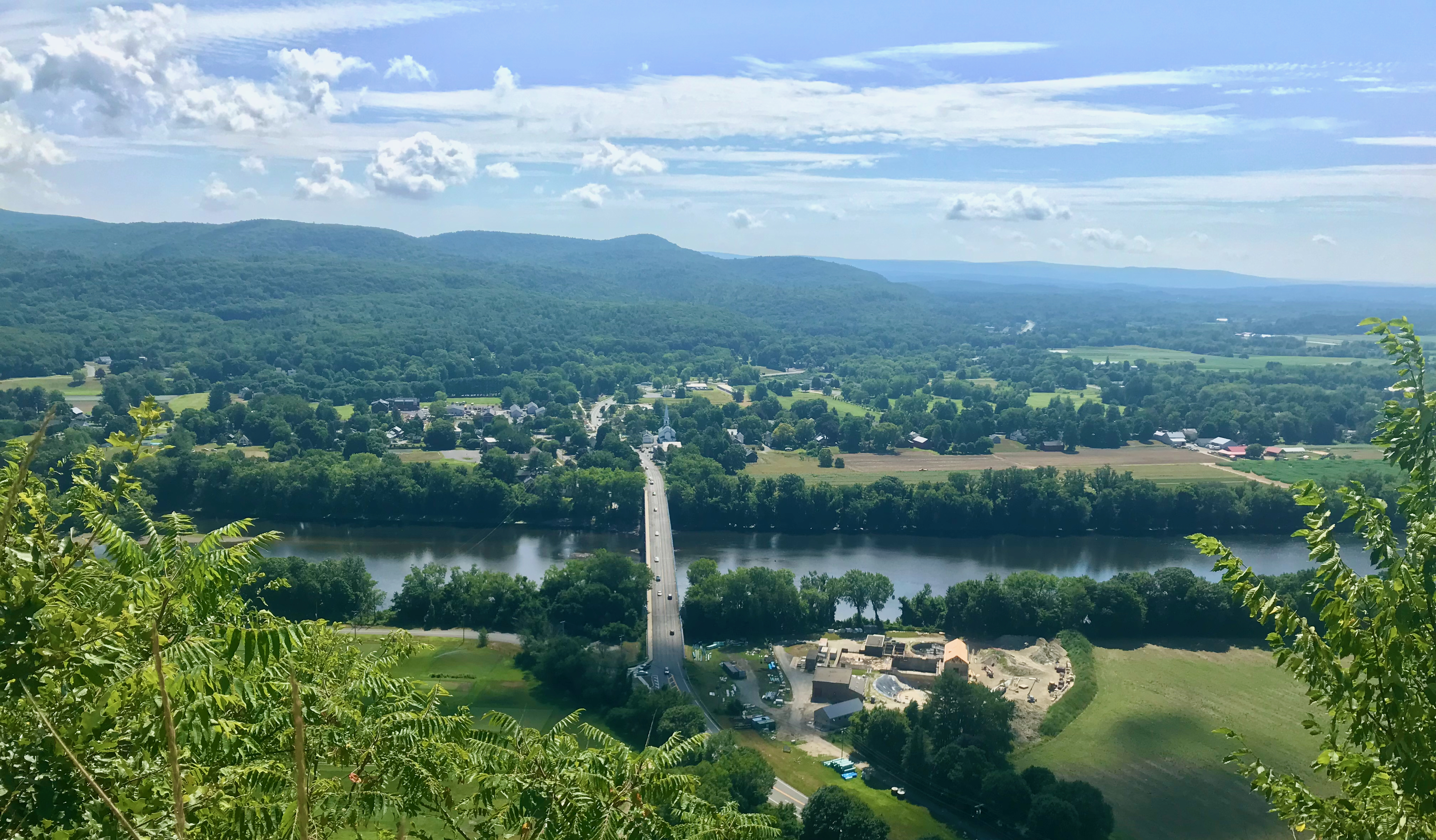
MA Route 116 Traffic Over Sunderland Bridge To Sunderland Massachusetts.

There is no interstate within town, with the nearest being Interstate 91 to the west of the town. Route 116 passes through the town, coming from Amherst and passing into Deerfield along the Sunderland Bridge. The bridge is the only road crossing of the Connecticut River between the General Pierce Bridge between Greenfield and Montague to the north, and the Calvin Coolidge Bridge between Hadley and Northampton to the south, a distance of 19 miles (31 km). Route 47 also passes through the western part of town, crossing Route 116 and heading north before terminating at Route 63 in Montague. Route 63 passes through the town for a short distance in the northeastern corner of town. Alongside Route 63, the New England Central Railroad passes through the town, which, before the 2014 realignment, carried the Amtrak Vermonter line through town towards Vermont. There was, however, no stop for the train within the town. The town is served by a route of the Greenfield-based Franklin Regional Transit Authority (FRTA) bus line, traveling south from parts of Montague to a southern terminus near the Sunderland Bridge, and two routes of the Pioneer Valley Transit Authority (PVTA) bus line, on a corridor with service between Amherst and South Deerfield. The nearest general aviation airport is the Turners Falls Airport in Montague, with the nearest national air service being at Bradley International Airport in Connecticut.

== Demographics ==
Historical population
Year	Pop.	±%
1790	462	—
1800	537	+16.2%
1810	551	+2.6%
1820	597	+8.3%
1830	666	+11.6%
1840	719	+8.0%
1850	792	+10.2%
1860	839	+5.9%
1870	832	−0.8%
1880	755	−9.3%
1890	663	−12.2%
1900	771	+16.3%
1910	1,047	+35.8%
1920	1,289	+23.1%
1930	1,159	−10.1%
1940	1,085	−6.4%
1950	905	−16.6%
1960	1,279	+41.3%
1970	2,236	+74.8%
1980	2,929	+31.0%
1990	3,399	+16.0%
2000	3,777	+11.1%
2010	3,684	−2.5%
2020	3,663	−0.6%
2022	3,647	−0.4%
Source: United States census records and Population Estimates Program data.

Age	People	Percent
Under 20	771	20.3
20–24	732	19.4
25–34	689	18.2
35–44	584	15.5
45–64	683	18.1
65+	318	8.5

Race	People	Percent
White	3,353	88.8
African American	89	2.4
Native American	10	0.3
Asian	243	6.4
Other	43	1.2
Two or more races	39	1

As of the census of 2000, there were 3,777 people, 1,633 households, and 765 families residing in the town. The population density was 262.5 inhabitants per square mile (101.4/km^{2}). There were 1,668 housing units at an average density of 115.9 per square mile (44.7/km^{2}). There were 1,633 households, out of which 22.5% had children under the age of 18 living with them, 37.5% were married couples living together, 6.7% had a female householder with no husband present, and 53.1% were non-families. 27.9% of all households were made up of individuals, and 4.9% had someone living alone who was 65 years of age or older. The average household size was 2.28 and the average family size was 2.93.

The median income for a household in the town was $37,147, and the median income for a family was $53,021. Males had a median income of $36,779 versus $30,526 for females. The per capita income for the town was $20,024. About 4.2% of families and 14.0% of the population were below the poverty line, including 5.8% of those under age 18 and none of those age 65 or over.

== Government ==
In July 2009, at a high turnout election, the town voted to not allow taxes to rise more than 2.5%. The vote was required by state law because towns are not allowed to raise taxes by more than 2.5% a year without voter approval. The town requested more money for education to ameliorate cuts in state funding because of the recession. In 2009 the town adopted a 0.75% sales tax on meals and hotels, bringing the total including the state sales tax to 7%.

== Education ==
Sunderland is a member of the Frontier Regional and Union 38 School Districts, which also includes Conway, Whately and Deerfield. Each town operates its own elementary school, with Sunderland Elementary School serving the town's students from preschool through sixth grades. All four towns send seventh through twelfth grade students to Frontier Regional School in Deerfield. Frontier's athletics teams are nicknamed the Redhawks, and the team colors are red and blue. There are many art programs available during and after school at Frontier. There are several private schools in the area, including the Bement School (a coeducational boarding school serving students from kindergarten through ninth grades), the Eaglebrook School (a private boys' school for grades 6–9), and the Deerfield Academy, a private prep school.

== Commerce ==
Sunderland boasts many businesses and restaurants, many of which are located along Amherst Road (Rt. 116). Sunderland is also the home of the seasonal Mike's Maze Corn Maze. Cooks Source magazine was based in Sunderland.

== Housing and development ==
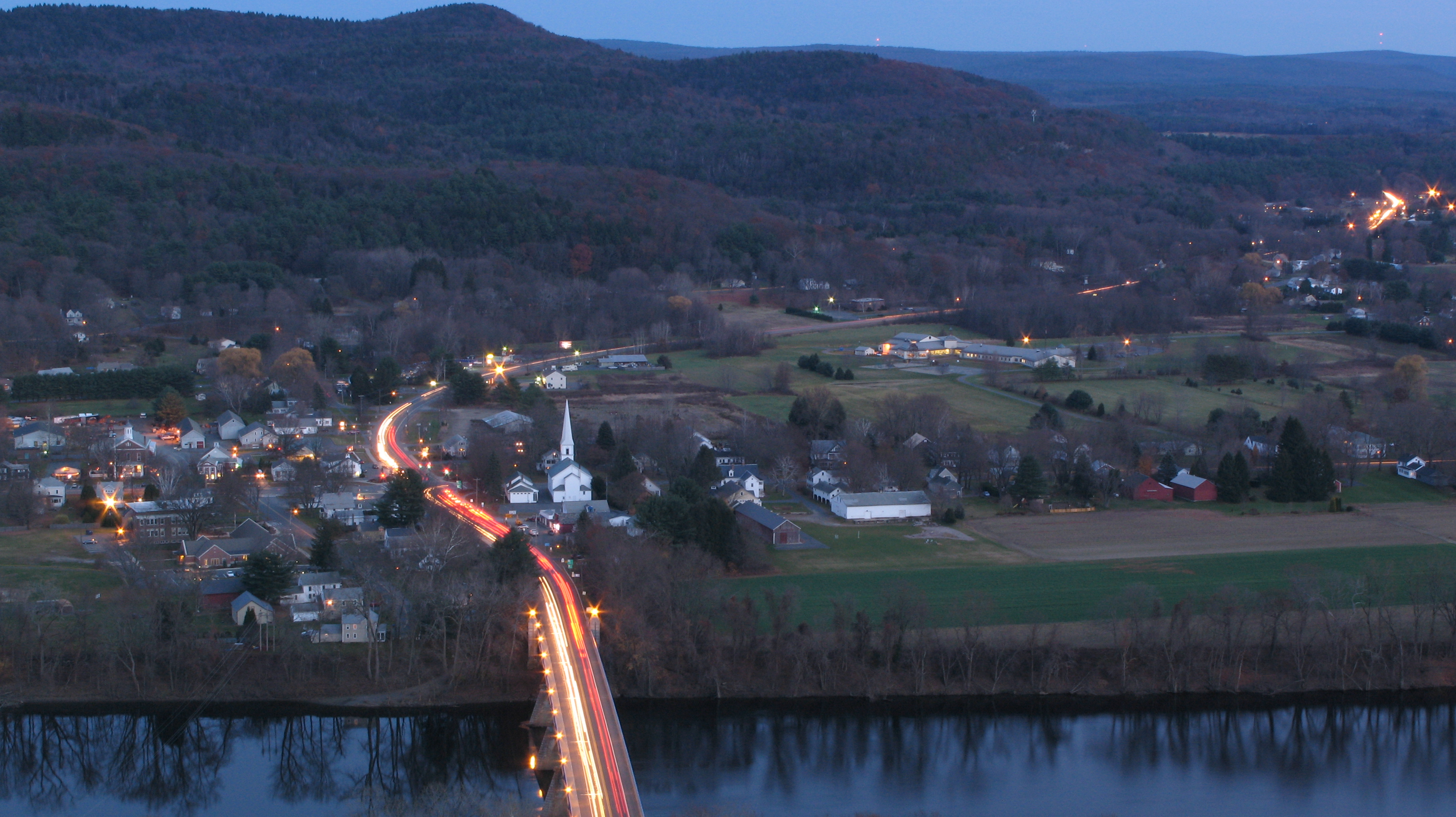
Sunderland, seen from Mt Sugarloaf in South Deerfield

The town makes use of an agricultural preservation restriction program. The development rights to farmland are bought up for 80% of the assessed value of the land. This allows farming to continue on the land but prevents residential and commercial development of the land. Such actions have resulted in negative economic consequences, and this is something that economists are becoming increasingly concerned about. According to the Office of Federal Housing Enterprise Oversight, between 1980 and 2003, the nation's largest overall percentage increase in housing prices occurred in Massachusetts. The cost of rental housing has grown similarly. A study by the National Low Income Housing Coalition rated Massachusetts as being the least affordable state in which to rent an apartment in 2003. The town, however, has a significant number of rental housing units that are home to many students from the neighboring colleges. These rental units are affordable to low and moderate income residents, but are not qualified as "affordable" under Chapter 40B, the state's stringent affordable housing law which requires deed restrictions to assure affordability in perpetuity. Sunderland has more rental units per capita than nearly every other municipality in the Commonwealth of Massachusetts.

== Recreation ==
According to the 2007 Annual Report, upwards of 40 programs and events were made available to the residents of Sunderland through the support of the Recreation Department. Events and programs include craft lessons, UMass ice hockey and football events, adult and youth sports, an annual Easter Egg Hunt, hikes, dance lessons, and many other activities in Sunderland and the surrounding areas. The town holds annual fall festivals in mid-October and a Memorial Day parade and ceremony.

The Mount Toby state reservation is on the northern edge of Sunderland, hosting a large trail network that is open to hiking, jogging, mountain biking, skiing, snowmobiling, and hunting. The Sunderland Boat Ramp on the Connecticut River allows for swimming, fishing, and boating.

== See also ==
- Pioneer Valley
- Massachusetts Comprehensive Permit Act: Chapter 40B
- Robert Frost Trail
