= Frontier Regional School =

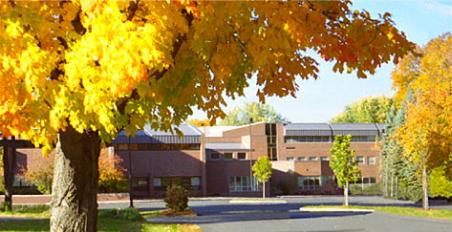

Location
- 113 North Main Street; South Deerfield, MA 01373; United States; 42°29′00.35″N 72°36′14.94″W

Information
- Type: Public high school Open enrollment
- Established: Renovated in 1997-98
- School district: Union 38 School District
- Superintendent: Darrius M. Modestow
- Principal: George Lanides, Scott Dredge
- Faculty: 55.29 (FTE)
- Grades: 7–12
- Enrollment: 605 (2023-24)
- Student to teacher ratio: 10.96
- Colors: Red and blue
- Nickname: Redhawks
- Rival: Mohawk
- Publication: Red Hawk Report
- Yearbook: The Aero
- Budget: $12,477,465 total $17,436 per pupil (2016-)
- Communities served: Deerfield, Sunderland, Whately, Conway
- Information: 413-665-2118
- Website: www.frsu38.org/frontier/

Frontier Regional School (FRS) is a regional combined public high school and middle school in South Deerfield, Massachusetts, United States, serving students in grades 7–12, as part of the Union 38 School District. The district serves the four towns of Deerfield, Sunderland, Whately and Conway.

== Academics ==
Frontier Regional runs on a semester system. Students can take 4–10 courses per semester; either 4 semester courses that meet every day, or 3 semester courses that meet every day and 5 quarter courses that meet every-other day. Quarter courses are usually non-academics, such as gym class or wood shop.

== Athletics ==
=== Fall sports ===
Football - The Frontier Red Hawks are a part of the Intercounty League. The team has a rivalry with opposing team Mohawk. The rivalry dates back to when the teams faced on Veterans Day, starting back in 1934, when Frontier was known as Deerfield High School, and Mohawk as Arms Academy. The team is a four-time MIAA Western Massachusetts Champion, with its most recent coming in the 2006 season.

Soccer - The boys' soccer team is part of the Schmid Division and competes in MIAA Division II Soccer. Before 2001, they had not had a winning season since their inception in the early 1990s. Since 2001, the boys' soccer team has built a program that has consistently been at the top of the McGrath South table and was a No. 1 seed in the Division III tournament for three seasons (2007–2009).

Cross Country - The 2013 boys' cross country team went undefeated and won their league title for the first time in school history. In the 2014 regular season, the team lost to Mohawk Trail Regional High School in the first meet of the season but went undefeated afterwards and came runners up in the league only to Mohawk who went undefeated. On November 14, 2015, the boys' cross-country team qualified for the MIAA All-State for the first time in school history.

Volleyball - The girls' volleyball team have won eleven MIAA DIII State Championships, in the 2005, 2006, 2010, 2011, 2012, 2013, 2014, 2015, 2017, 2019, and 2022 seasons. The program has won 18 Western Mass championships. Cassidy Stankowski was also selected as the MA Gatorade Player of the Year in 2011 & 2012 and an AVCA All-American.

=== Winter sports ===
Basketball - The boys' basketball team captured its first state championship in 1987. The Redhawks won their most recent state title in 2008 defeating Scituate High School. Before the 2008 run, the Frontier boys' basketball team had made numerous trips throughout the early and mid-2000s to the Western Massachusetts Division III Finals.

=== Spring sports ===
Baseball - The Redhawks, who are led by coach Aaron Campbell, play in the Hampshire League. In the 2008 season after a start of 7–8, the Redhawks finished as MIAA DIII Western Mass champions, advancing as far as the state finals. They finished with a record of 17–9.

Softball

Track and field - The track and field program at Frontier has a long history behind it. The girls' team, which is led by Bob Smith and Jim Recore, has a no-loss record dating back to 1998. The boys' track team is coached by Walter Flynn and Kevin Seetal and won their first league title on May 9, 2011.

Tennis

== Name change ==
In 1997, a group of local residents asked that Frontier do away with its mascot, which they deemed "offensive" to residents of Native American descent. The Frontier School Committee voted to remove the Redskin mascot and delete any reference to the term. There was much opposition, as the term ‘Redskin’ had been in use for 44 years. Thus started an over two-year struggle as to what the name should be. Eventually in 2000, the name was removed, and the school was labeled with the mascot 'Redhawk', with the 2001–2002 school year the first year the name was used.

== Administration ==
- Principal: George Lanides
- Vice Principal: Scott Dredge

== Elementary schools ==
Four elementary schools send their students to Frontier Regional upon completion of 6th grade. Those schools are:

- Deerfield Elementary School
- Conway Grammar School
- Sunderland Elementary School
- Whately Elementary School

== Notable alumni ==
- Mark Chmura (1978), former football player
- Beth Karas (1975), attorney
