= Mark Chmura =

American football player (born 1969)

No. 89
- Position: Tight end

Personal information
- Born: February 22, 1969 (age 57); Deerfield, Massachusetts, U.S.
- Listed height: 6 ft 5 in (1.96 m)
- Listed weight: 255 lb (116 kg)

Career information
- High school: Frontier Regional (South Deerfield, Massachusetts)
- College: Boston College
- NFL draft: 1992: 6th round, 157th overall pick

Career history
- Green Bay Packers (1992–1999)

Awards and highlights
- Super Bowl champion (XXXI); 3× Pro Bowl (1995, 1997, 1998); 2x All-NFC (1995, 1998); Green Bay Packers Hall of Fame; First-team All-American (1991); 2× First-team All-East (1990, 1991); Second-team All-East (1989)

Career NFL statistics
- Receptions: 188
- Receiving yards: 2,253
- Receiving touchdowns: 17
- Stats at Pro Football Reference

Mark William Chmura (born February 22, 1969) is an American former professional football player who was a tight end for the Green Bay Packers of the National Football League (NFL). He played college football for the Boston College Eagles, earning first-team All-American honors in 1991. He was selected by Green Bay in the sixth round (157th overall) of the 1992 NFL draft. He played his entire career with the Packers. During his playing career, his nickname was "Chewy". He won Super Bowl XXXI with the Packers against his hometown team, the New England Patriots.

== College career ==
Before his NFL career, Chmura began (and eventually ended) his career at Frontier Regional High School. Chmura then played for Boston College, where he set a school record with 164 receptions. The record has since been broken, but his mark is still 4th in school history. His 2,046 yards is also sixth in school history.

== Professional career ==
Pre-draft measurables
Height	Weight	Arm length	Hand span	40-yard dash	10-yard split	20-yard split	20-yard shuttle	Vertical jump	Broad jump	Bench press
6 ft 5 in (1.96 m)	235 lb (107 kg)	32 7/8 in (0.84 m)	8 1/2 in (0.22 m)	5.03 s	1.73 s	2.87 s	4.16 s	30.5 in (0.77 m)	8 ft 9 in (2.67 m)	13 reps
All values from NFL Combine

Chmura was drafted in the sixth round of the 1992 NFL draft, and selected to the Pro Bowl in 1995, 1997, and 1998. He played for the Packers from 1992 to 1999, whom he assisted to Super Bowl XXXI and Super Bowl XXXII. He scored the final points of Super Bowl XXXI with a 2-point conversion catch, and he finished Super Bowl XXXII with 4 catches for 43 yards and a touchdown.

In 1997, Chmura chose not to meet with United States President Bill Clinton at the White House following the Packers Super Bowl XXXI win. While many claimed that this was because Chmura was a staunch Republican, the meeting fell on the same day as the annual Mike Utley golf tournament. The tournament is something that Chmura had played in every year since 1992 to honor former Detroit Lion player Mike Utley who had been paralyzed on the field.

Chmura suffered a career-ending herniation of his C5 and C6 discs in his cervical spine. Chmura was released by the Packers in 2000. After his release, he attempted a comeback, with the Washington Redskins and the New Orleans Saints showing interest, but suffered a relapse of the injury while working out in his weight room and retired. In eight seasons with the Packers, Chmura finished his career in third place all-time in franchise history among tight ends with 188 receptions 2,253 yards, and 17 touchdowns in 89 games. In 2010, he was inducted into the Green Bay Packers Hall of Fame.

== Career statistics ==
=== NFL ===
Legend
	Won the Super Bowl
**Bold**	Career high

==== Regular season ====
Year	Team	Games		Receiving				
Year	Team	GP	GS	Rec	Yds	Avg	Lng	TD
1993	GNB	14	0	2	13	6.5	7	0
1994	GNB	14	4	14	165	11.8	27	0
1995	GNB	**16**	**15**	**54**	**679**	12.6	**33**	**7**
1996	GNB	13	13	28	370	**13.2**	29	0
1997	GNB	15	14	38	417	11.0	32	6
1998	GNB	15	14	47	554	11.8	25	4
1999	GNB	2	2	5	55	11.0	16	0
Career		89	62	188	2,253	12.0	33	17

==== Playoffs ====
Year	Team	Games		Receiving				
Year	Team	GP	GS	Rec	Yds	Avg	Lng	TD
1993	GNB	2	0	0	0	0.0	0	0
1994	GNB	2	2	7	**88**	**12.6**	**33**	0
1995	GNB	**3**	2	6	50	8.3	16	**2**
1996	GNB	**3**	**3**	3	28	9.3	15	0
1997	GNB	**3**	**3**	**8**	81	10.1	21	**2**
1998	GNB	1	1	1	12	12.0	12	0
Career		14	11	25	259	10.4	33	4

=== College ===
Year	Team	GP	Receiving		
Year	Team	GP	Rec	Yards	TD
1988	Boston College	11	27	377	0
1989	Boston College	11	47	522	2
1990	Boston College	11	47	560	3
1991	Boston College	11	43	587	6
**Total**		**44**	**164**	**2,046**	**11**

== Personal life ==
=== Legal trouble ===
On April 8, 2000, Chmura was accused of sexually assaulting the 17-year-old babysitter of his children. Chmura was tried but found not guilty of all charges. Two days after being acquitted of child enticement and third-degree sexual assault, Chmura acknowledged that his behavior at a post-prom party "wasn't something a married man should do."

=== Post-football career ===
In 2004, Chmura began hosting a Sunday morning Packers pregame show on ESPN 540 in Milwaukee and is still presently hosting the show each week. In 2019, he began hosting the Gabe & Chewy Show with Gabe Neitzel during weekday mornings on WAUK. In 2020 the station moved to 94.5 WKTI in a format switch and they added sportscaster and Marquette University alum Jen Lada to create the Jen, Gabe, & Chewy show which still airs as of 2025.

From 2005 to 2009, Chmura worked as a research assistant for the Boyle Law Group. He was also an assistant football coach at Waukesha West High School, where his son, Dylan, played tight end, and son Dyson also played at Waukesha West. Dylan also played for Michigan State University. In 2017, Chmura was hired as the offensive coordinator of Greenfield High School under head coach Keith Ringelberg.

In 2010, Chmura was inducted into the Packers Hall of Fame.

He resides in Wisconsin with his family. Along with his wife, he owned a chain of auto collision repair businesses. In 2020, these businesses were sold.
