= Swampfield =

Swampfield is a former name of two different places in the United States:

- Danbury, Connecticut, a city
- Sunderland, Massachusetts, a town
