= Deerfield, Massachusetts =

Deerfield, Massachusetts Pocumtuck
- Town
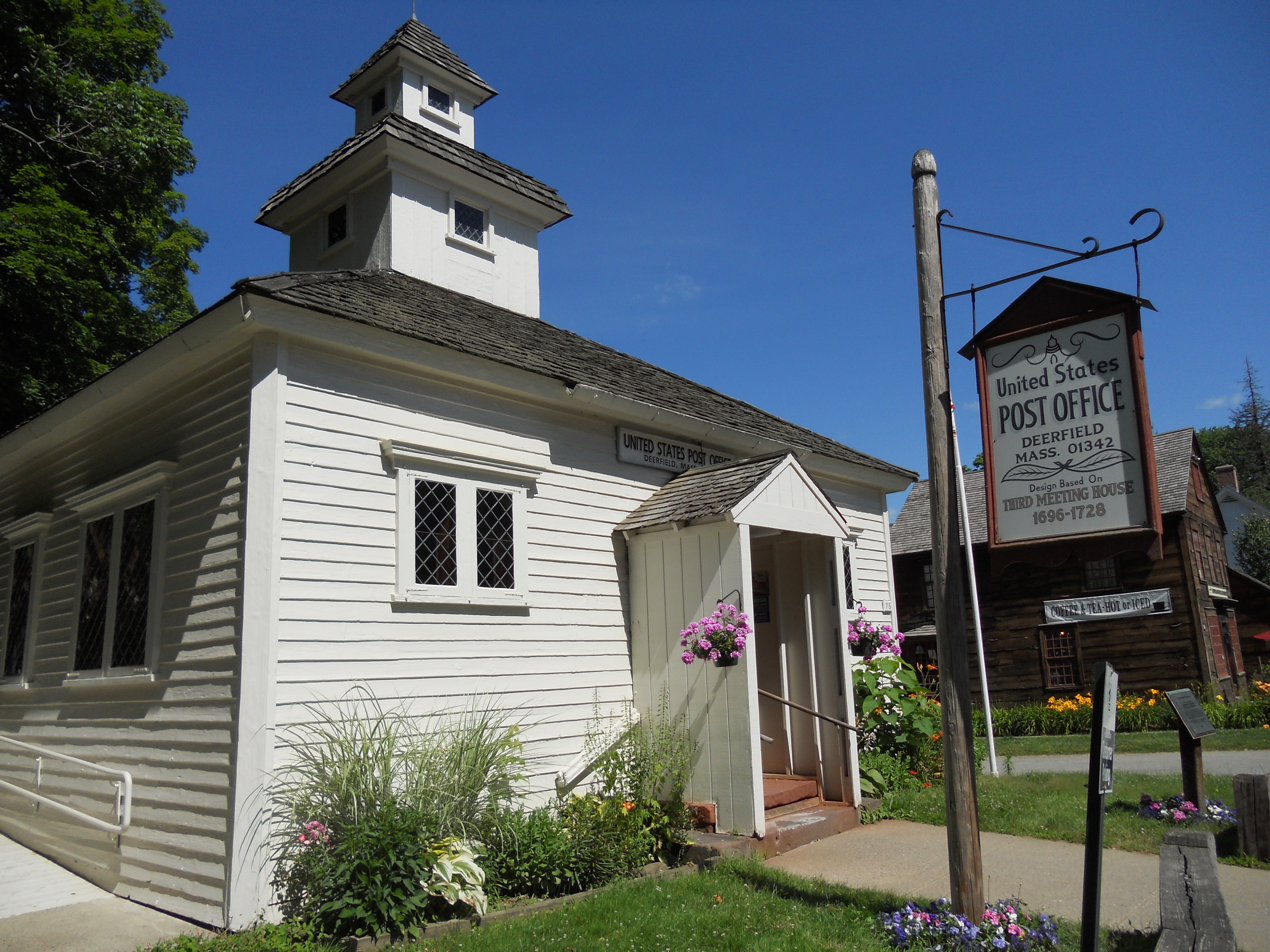
- Post office in Deerfield

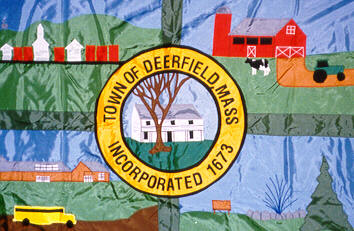
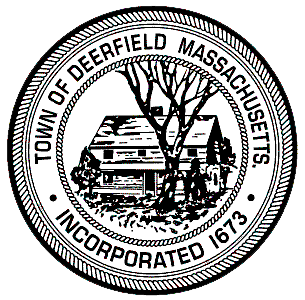
- Flag Seal
- Motto: "New England as you hope to find it"
- Location in Franklin County in Massachusetts
- Coordinates: 42°32′42″N 72°36′16″W
- Country: United States
- State: Massachusetts
- County: Franklin
- Settled: 1673
- Incorporated: October 22, 1677

Government
  - Type: Open town meeting

Area
  - Total: 33.4 sq mi (86.6 km^{2})
  - Land: 32.4 sq mi (83.9 km^{2})
  - Water: 1.1 sq mi (2.8 km^{2})
- Elevation: 151 ft (46 m)

Population (2020)
  - Total: 5,090
  - Density: 157/sq mi (60.7/km^{2})
- Time zone: UTC−5 (Eastern)
  - Summer (DST): UTC−4 (Eastern)
- ZIP Codes: 01342 (Deerfield); 01373 (South Deerfield)
- Area code: 413
- FIPS code: 25-16670
- GNIS feature ID: 0618162
- Website: www.deerfieldma.us

Deerfield is a town in Franklin County, Massachusetts, United States. Settled near the Connecticut River in the 17th century during the colonial era, the population was 5,090 as of the 2020 census. Deerfield is part of the Springfield, Massachusetts Metropolitan Statistical Area in western Massachusetts, lying 30 miles (48 km) north of the city of Springfield.

Deerfield includes the villages of South Deerfield and Old Deerfield, which is home to two museums: Pocumtuck Valley Memorial Association and Historic Deerfield, Inc. Historic Deerfield is designated as a National Historic Landmark district, and the organization operates a museum with a focus on decorative arts, early American material culture, and history. Its eleven house museums offer interpretation of society, history, and culture from the colonial era through the late nineteenth century. The Pocumtuck Valley Memorial Association operates Memorial Hall Museum, which opened in 1880, as well as the Indian House Memorial Children's Museum and Bloody Brook Tavern. The site of early 18th century colonial battles including the Raid on Deerfield, the town is a center of heritage tourism in the Pioneer Valley.

Deerfield has numerous schools, including Deerfield Academy, a private secondary preparatory school; Frontier Regional High School; Deerfield Elementary; and two separate private junior boarding schools, Bement School, which is co-ed, and Eaglebrook School, which is a school for boys.

== History ==
=== Pre-colonial history ===
For several decades during the late seventeenth and early eighteenth centuries, Deerfield was the northwesternmost outpost of New England settlement. It occupies a fertile portion of the upper Connecticut River Valley now known as the Pioneer Valley. It was vulnerable to attack because of its position near the Berkshires highlands. For these reasons it was the site of intertribal warfare and several Anglo-French and Indian skirmishes during its early history.

At the time of the English colonists' arrival, the Deerfield area was inhabited by the Algonquian-speaking Pocumtuck nation, who settled a major village by the same name.

=== Settlement and incorporation ===
After the "Praying Indians" were given 8,000 acres (32 km^{2}) in what is today Natick, the General Court gave the Dedham proprietors 8,000 acres (32 km^{2}) in compensation. The question of how to handle the additional grant puzzled the town for some time. There were those who wanted to sell the rights to the land and take the money, while others wanted to find a suitable location and take possession.

The Town sent Anthony Fisher, Jr., Nathaniel Fisher, and Sgt. Fuller to explore an area known as "Chestnut Country" in 1663. They reported back two weeks later that the area was hilly, with few meadows, and was generally unsuitable for their purposes. After a potential location was claimed by others before Dedham could do so, a report was received about land at a place known as Pocomtuck, about 12 or 14 miles from Hadley. It was decided to claim the land before others could do so.

Joshua Fisher, Ensign John Euerard, and Jonathan Danforth were assigned by the selectmen to go and map the land in return for 150 acres. Two weeks later he appeared before the board, demanding 300 acres instead. The selectmen agreed, provided that he provide a plot map of the land. Fisher's map and report were submitted to the General Court, and they agreed to give the land to Dedham provided that they settle the land and "maintain the ordinances of Christ there" within five years.

Daniel Fisher and Eleazer Lusher were sent to purchase the land from the Pocomtuc Indians who lived there. They contracted with John Pynchon, who had a relationship with the native peoples there, and he obtained a quitclaim deed from them. Pynchon signed a treaty with the Pocumtuck, including a man named Chaulk. But Chaulk had no authority to deed the land to the colonists and appeared to have only a rough idea of what he was signing. Native Americans and the English had different ideas about property and land use; this, along with competition for resources, contributed to conflicts between them.

Pynchon submitted a bill for £40 in 1666 but a tax on the cow commons to pay it was not imposed until 1669. By that time the bill had risen to over £96, and he was not paid in full until 1674.

The drawing of lots took place on May 23, 1670, by which time many rights had been sold to people from outside of Dedham or one of her daughter towns. Before that even happened, Robert Hinsdale's son Samuel moved into the area and began squatting on the land. He was eventually joined by his father and brothers.

Hard feelings arose at the distance of the new settlement from Dedham and the fact that the proprietors were not strictly "a Dedham company." On May 7, 1673, the General Court separated the town of Deerfield, with additional lands, provided they establish a church and settle a minister within three years.

=== Post-incorporation ===
The Pocumtuck were much reduced in number by the time the settlers arrived, as they had been victims of infectious diseases and war with the more powerful Mohawk. The settlers forcibly expelled the few Pocumtuck who remained; the Pocumtuck in turn sought French protection in Canada from the English colonists. At the Battle of Bloody Brook, on September 18, 1675, during King Philip's War, the dispossessed Indians destroyed a small force under the command of Captain Thomas Lathrop before being driven off by reinforcements. Colonial casualties numbered about 60. At dawn on May 19, 1676, Captain William Turner led an army of settlers in a surprise retaliatory attack on Peskeompskut, in present-day Montague, then a traditional native gathering place. Turner and his men killed 200 natives, mostly women and children. When the men of the tribe returned, they routed Turner's forces; Turner died after being wounded at Green River.

In the predawn hours of February 29, 1704, during Queen Anne's War, joint French and Indian forces (including 47 Canadiens and 200 Abenaki, along with some Kanienkehaka (Mohawk), Wyandot, and a few Pocumtuck, all under the command of Jean-Baptiste Hertel de Rouville) attacked the town in what became known as the Raid on Deerfield. They razed much of the settlement and killed 56 colonists, including 22 men, 9 women, and 25 children. The attackers took 112 captives, including women and children, and forced them on a months-long trek to Montreal, nearly 300 miles to the north. Many died along the way; others were killed because they could not keep up.

In this period, there was an active trade in ransoming captives among both the English and French. Deerfield and other communities collected funds to ransom the captives, and negotiations were conducted between the colonial governments. When the Massachusetts Bay Colony released the French pirate Pierre Maisonnat dit Baptiste, Canada arranged redemption of numerous Deerfield people, among them the prominent minister John Williams. He wrote a captivity narrative about his experience, which was published in 1707 and became well known. One of those captured and ransomed was Mehuman Kellog, the first white child born in Deerfield and a descendant of Robert Hinsdale.

In addition to ransoming captives, because of losses to war and disease, families of the Mohawk and other tribes often adopted younger captives into their tribes. Such was the case with Williams's daughter Eunice, who was 8 years old when captured. She became thoroughly assimilated and at age 16 married a Mohawk man. They had a family and she stayed with the Mohawk for the rest of her life. Most of the Deerfield captives eventually returned to New England; others remained by choice in French and Native communities, such as Kahnawake, for the rest of their lives.

As the frontier moved north, Deerfield became another colonial town with an unquiet early history. In 1753 Greenfield was set off and incorporated. During the early nineteenth century, Deerfield's role in Northeast agricultural production declined. It was overtaken by the rapid development of the Midwestern United States as the nation's breadbasket, as transportation to eastern markets and New York City was enhanced by construction of the Erie Canal and later railroads.

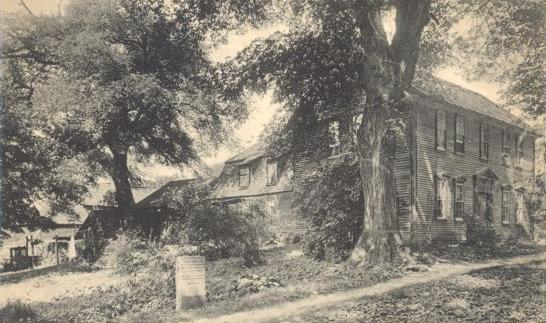
Sheldon homestead, c. 1912

During the Colonial Revival movement of the late nineteenth century, Deerfield citizens rediscovered the town's past. Residents founded the Pocumtuck Valley Memorial Association in 1870 and erected monuments to commemorate various events, including the Bloody Brook and 1704 attacks. In 1890 Charlotte Alice Baker returned to Deerfield to restore her family home, the Frary House. Baker was assisted by the Boston architectural firm Shepley, Rutan & Coolidge, and her project was one of the first in historic preservation in western Massachusetts.

Local historian George Sheldon wrote an account of the town's early history that was published in the late nineteenth century. By this time South Deerfield and other New England villages were already absorbing a new wave of Eastern European immigrants, particularly from Poland. The new people influenced Deerfield's demographics and culture. They were mostly Catholic peasants, who built their own churches. Working first as laborers, they formed a community later known as Old Polonia. Twentieth-century immigrants from Poland tended to be more educated but settled in the larger cities. Immigrants in smaller communities followed different paths, and their descendants often moved to cities for more opportunities.

Today, heritage tourism is Deerfield's principal industry and is important to the Pioneer Valley. "Historic Deerfield" has been designated as a National Historic Landmark district, containing eleven house museums and a regional museum and visitors' center. It focuses on decorative arts, early American material culture, and history. Its eleven house museums offer interpretation through the late nineteenth century. The Pocumtuck Valley Memorial Association operates the Memorial Hall Museum, which opened in 1880; and the Indian House Memorial Children's Museum and Bloody Brook Tavern. Deerfield is a center of heritage tourism in the Pioneer Valley near the Connecticut River. The Yankee Candle Company is an example of one of many commercial businesses associated with this history.

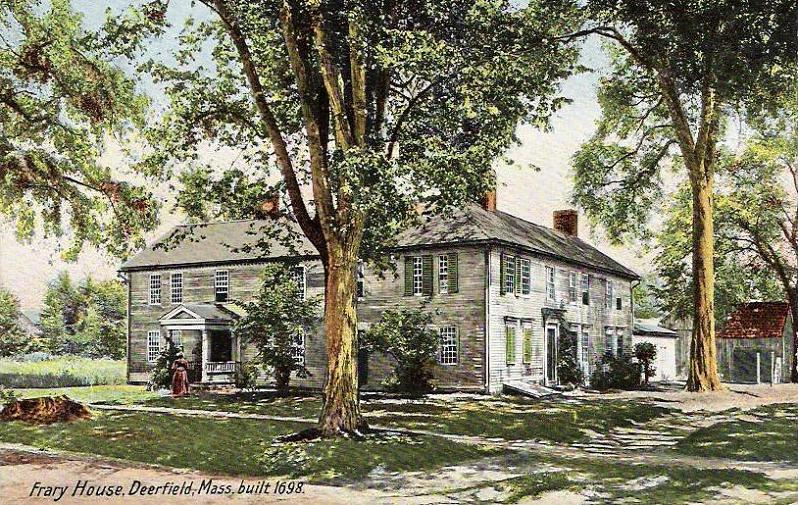
Frary House c. 1905

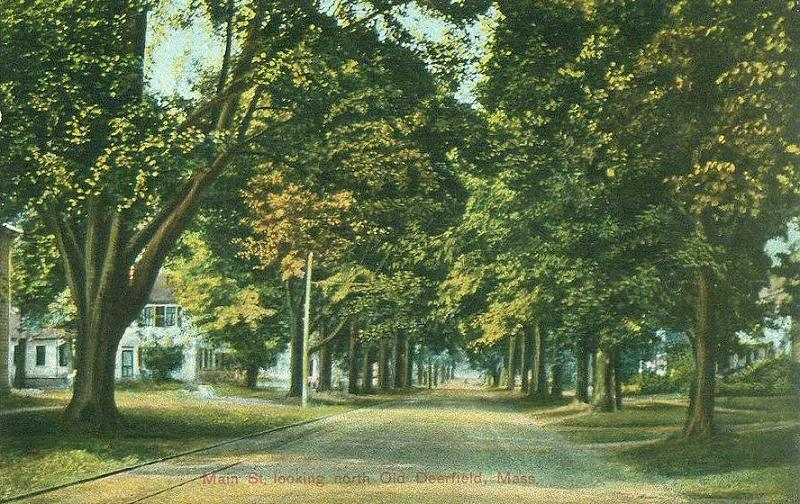
Old Main Street c. 1910

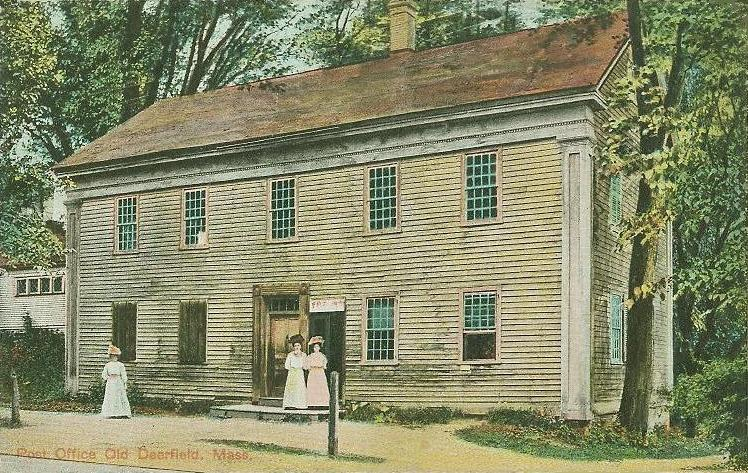
Post office c. 1910

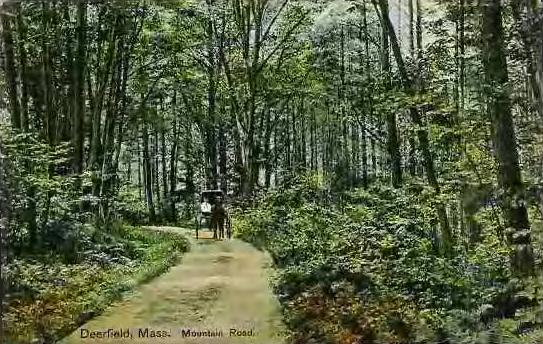
Mountain Road c. 1910

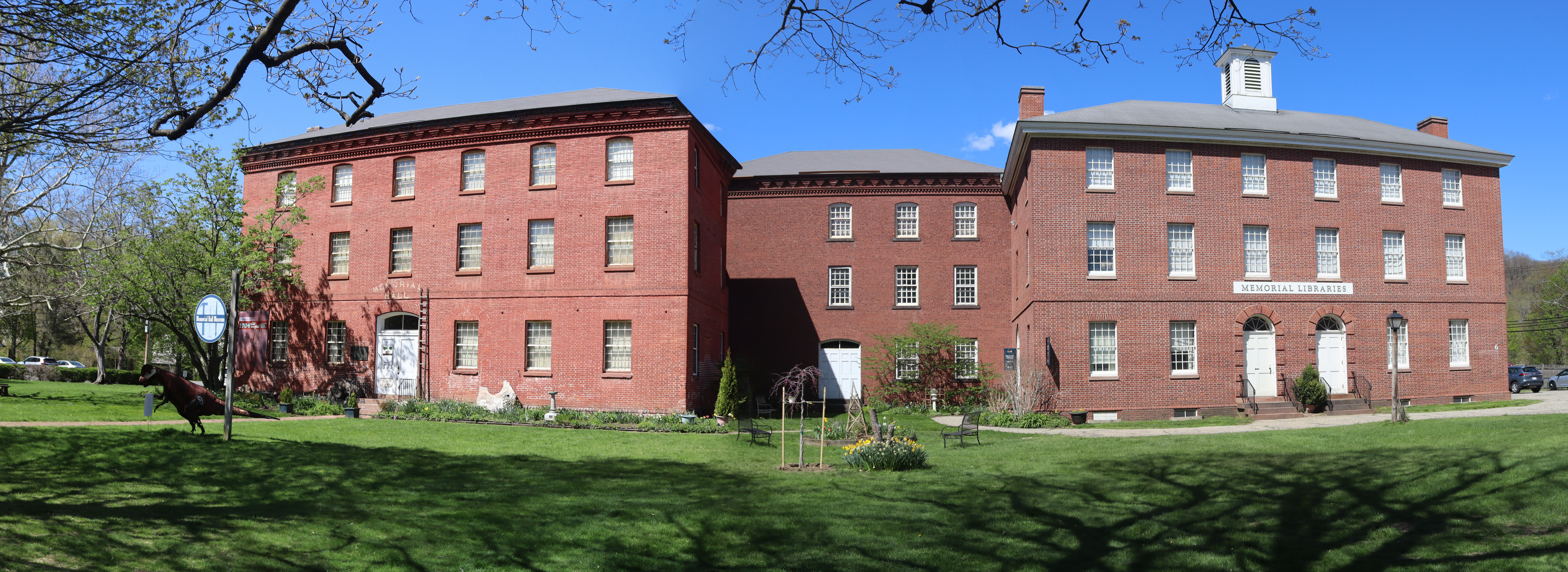
Pocumtuck Valley Memorial Hall in 2026

== Geography ==
According to the United States Census Bureau, the town has a total area of 33.4 square miles (86.6 km^{2}), of which 32.4 square miles (83.9 km^{2}) is land and 1.1 square miles (2.8 km^{2}), or 3.17 percent, is water. Deerfield is located in the northern Pioneer Valley and is bordered by Greenfield to the north, Montague to the northeast, Sunderland to the southeast, Whately to the south, Conway to the west, and Shelburne to the northwest. The town center is located 8 miles (13 km) south of Greenfield, 29 miles (47 km) north of Springfield, and 93 miles (150 km) west of Boston.

Deerfield's northern point is located at the confluence of the Deerfield and Connecticut rivers, with the former flowing through the northwestern corner of the town and the latter forming the eastern border of the town. Several brooks and the Mill River also flow through the town. North Sugarloaf Mountain rises above the Connecticut in the southeastern corner, providing a panoramic view of the valley and the town center. The Pocumtuck Range rises along the eastern side of town north of Sugarloaf.

Interstate 91 passes from south to north through the central part of town, crossing the Deerfield River near the river's southernmost bend. The interstate is paralleled by U.S. Route 5 and Massachusetts Route 10, which run concurrently through the town. Route 116 also passes through town, combining with Routes 5 and 10 for a one-mile stretch, briefly passing into Whately before separating and crossing through the southern part of town and over the Connecticut River at the Sunderland Bridge. All three routes historically crossed through the center of the village prior to the construction of I-91 but were rerouted to a more direct route, closer to the highway.

The Connecticut River Line, a rail line currently owned by the Massachusetts Department of Transportation, passes through the town. The nearest Amtrak passenger service is at Greenfield's John W. Olver Transit Center, a stop for the Vermonter and the Valley Flyer service. Deerfield has inter-city bus service through Peter Pan Bus Lines. The Franklin Regional Transit Authority and Pioneer Valley Transit Authority provide commuter bus service to Amherst, Greenfield, and Northampton. The nearest small air service is in Gill and Northampton. The nearest national air service is Bradley International Airport in Windsor Locks, Connecticut.

View of Historic Deerfield and Deerfield Academy from Pocumtuck Rock.

== Demographics ==
Historical population
Year	Pop.	±%
1790	1,330	—
1840	1,934	+45.4%
1850	2,421	+25.2%
1860	3,073	+26.9%
1870	3,632	+18.2%
1880	3,543	−2.5%
1890	2,910	−17.9%
1900	1,969	−32.3%
1910	2,209	+12.2%
1920	2,803	+26.9%
1930	2,882	+2.8%
1940	2,684	−6.9%
1950	3,086	+15.0%
1960	3,338	+8.2%
1970	3,850	+15.3%
1980	4,517	+17.3%
1990	5,018	+11.1%
2000	4,750	−5.3%
2010	5,125	+7.9%
2020	5,090	−0.7%
2023	5,176	+1.7%
Source: United States census records and Population Estimates Program data.

As of the census of 2010, there were 5,125 people, 2,053 households, and 1,350 families residing in the town. The population density was 158.2 inhabitants per square mile (61.1/km^{2}). There were 2,181 housing units. The racial makeup of the town was 95 percent White, 0.8 percent African American, 0.1 percent Native American, 1.9 percent Asian, 0.5 percent from other races, and 1.8 percent from two or more races. Hispanic or Latino people of any race were 2.6 percent of the population.

There were 2,053 households, out of which 26.3 percent had their own children under the age of 18 living with them; 52.4 percent were married couples living together, 9.4 percent had a female householder with no husband present, and 34.2 percent were nonfamilies. Individuals made up 26.3 percent of all households. The average household size was 2.33, and the average family size was 2.83.

As of the American Community Survey of 2015, the median income for a household was $74,853, and the median income for a family was $83,859. Men who worked full-time year-round had a median income of $70,873 versus $49,115 for similar females. The per capita income for the town was $38,379. Four percent of families and 7.5 percent of the population were below the poverty line, including 6.6 percent of those under age 18 and 7.8 percent of those age 65 or over.

== Government ==
Deerfield employs the open town meeting form of government and is led by a board of selectmen. The town has its own police, fire, and public works departments. The fire department and the post office both have two branches, in South Deerfield (where most of the town offices are) and in Old Deerfield Village, near Memorial Hall and the Old Town Hall. The town's Tilton Library is connected to the regional library network and is located in South Deerfield. The nearest hospital, Franklin Medical Center, is located in Greenfield, as are many regional state offices.

Deerfield is represented in the Massachusetts House of Representatives by the First Franklin district, which includes the southeastern third of Franklin County and towns in north central Hampshire County. The town is represented in the Massachusetts Senate by the Hampshire and Franklin district, which includes much of eastern Franklin and Hampshire Counties. The town is patrolled by the Second (Shelburne Falls) Barracks of Troop B of the Massachusetts State Police.

Deerfield is represented in the United States House of Representatives as part of Massachusetts's 2nd congressional district and has been represented by Jim McGovern of Worcester. Massachusetts is currently represented in the United States Senate by senators Ed Markey and Elizabeth Warren.

== Education ==
Deerfield is the central member of Frontier Regional and Union 38 School Districts, which also includes Conway, Whately, and Sunderland. Each town operates its own elementary school, with Deerfield Elementary School serving the town's students from kindergarten through sixth grades. All four towns send seventh through twelfth grade students to Frontier Regional School in the town. Frontier's athletics teams are nicknamed the Red Hawks, and the team colors are red and blue. There are many art programs available during and after school at Frontier. Private schools in the town include the Bement School (a coeducational boarding school for grades K–9), the Eaglebrook School (a private boys' boarding school for grades 6–9), and Deerfield Academy (a private school for grades 9–12). There are other private schools in the Deerfield area.

The nearest community college, Greenfield Community College, is located in Greenfield. The nearest state college is Massachusetts College of Liberal Arts in North Adams and the nearest state universities are the University of Massachusetts Amherst and Westfield State University. The nearest private colleges are Amherst College, Hampshire College, Mount Holyoke College, Smith College, and Thomas Aquinas College.

== Notable people ==
- Frank Boyden (1879–1972), Headmaster of Deerfield Academy
- Mark Chmura (1969), Played tight end for the Green Bay Packers of the National Football League (NFL) (1992-1999)
- Alon Bement (1876–1954), an American artist, arts administrator, author, and educator, whose family helped found Deerfield
- Francis John Higginson (1843–1931), rear admiral in U.S. Navy, raised in Deerfield
- Irwin Rose (1926–2015), biologist, Nobel prizewinner, died in Deerfield
- George Sheldon (1818–1916), Deerfield town historian and justice of the peace; leader of one of the first preservation societies in the United States
- Jennie Maria Arms Sheldon (1852–1938), curator of Deerfield's Memorial Hall Museum
- Lucy Terry (c. 1730–1821), African-American poet, slave in Deerfield
- John Williams (1817–1899), Episcopal bishop, born in Deerfield

== Works cited ==
- Hanson, Robert Brand (1976). Dedham, Massachusetts, 1635–1890. Dedham Historical Society.
- Lockridge, Kenneth (1985). A New England Town. New York: W. W. Norton & Company. ISBN 978-0-393-95459-3.
