= West Whately Historic District =

Historic district in Massachusetts, United States

- U.S. National Register of Historic Places
- U.S. Historic district
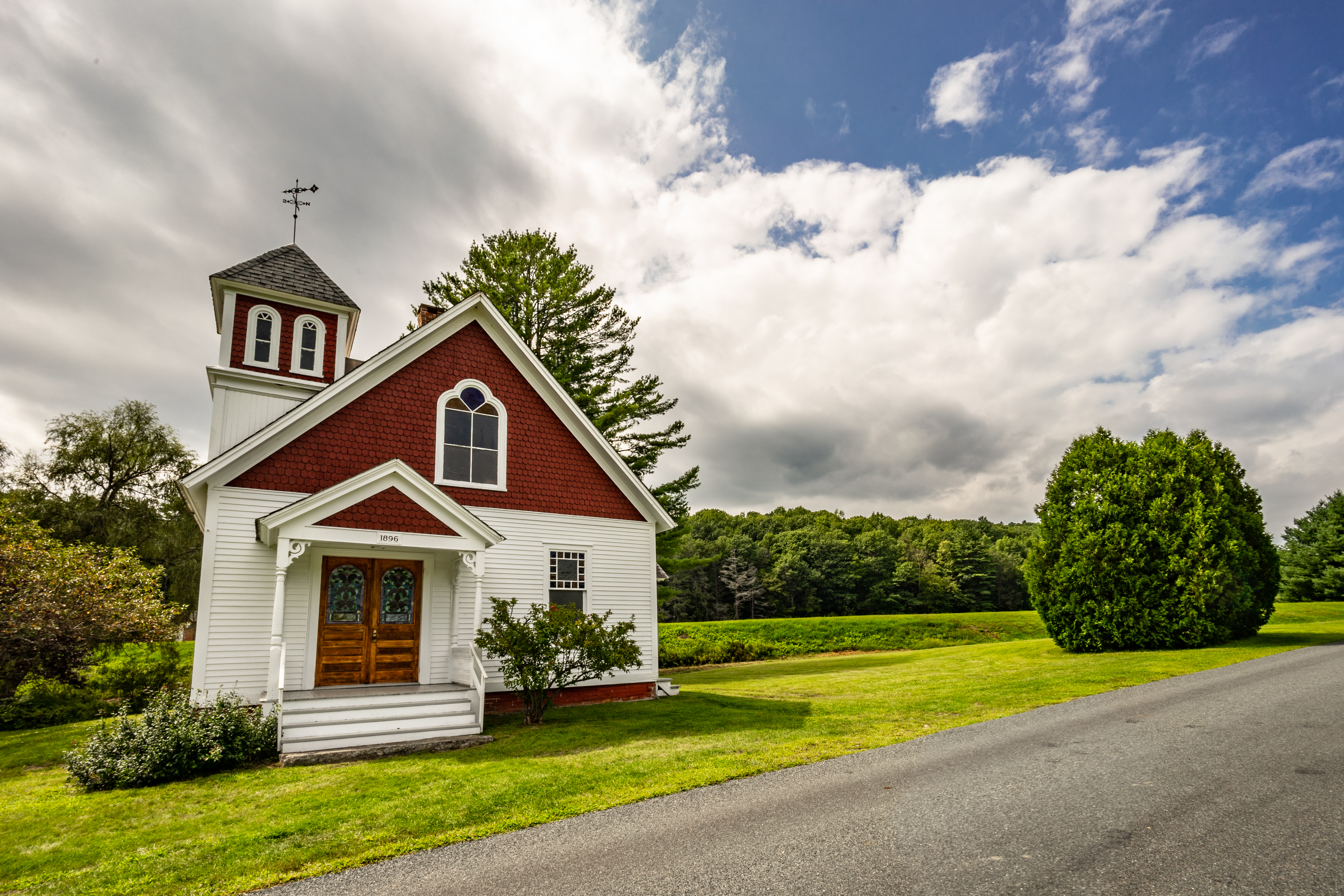
- West Whately Chapel

- Location within Massachusetts Location within the United States
- Location: Conwav, Dry Hill, Haydenville, Poplar Hill, Webber, Williamsburg Roads, Whately, Massachusetts
- Coordinates: 42°26′18″N 72°40′55″W
- Area: 762 acres (308 ha)
- Architectural style: Federal, Greek Revival
- NRHP reference No.: 03001018
- Added to NRHP: October 10, 2003

The West Whately Historic District is a historic district encompassing over 700 acres (280 ha) of western Whately, Massachusetts. The area, located in the foothills of The Berkshires above the Connecticut River, has a long agricultural history, but also experienced a surge of industrial activity in the 19th century, of which only fragments remain. The district, listed on the National Register of Historic Places in 2003, is focused on the areas surrounding West Brook and the areas where there was once industrial activity. From the late 18th century into the early 20th, there were some 16 mill complexes in the area, of which only one still has a surviving structure. The principal elements that survive of this industrial past are foundations and evidence of water works such as dams and millraces. There are only two institutional buildings in the district: the West Whately Chapel, built in the Queen Anne style in 1896, and a schoolhouse that has since been converted to a residence.

The oldest documented mill privilege on West Brook was granted about 1765 to Edward Brown, who operated a sawmill with his sons. This mill site was active into the 1920s, and was probably one of the longest-lived industrial sites. Privileges granted in the 1780s include one that was initially used for an oil mill, and another that included both grist and saw mills. At the mid-19th century, the area was that of the largest non-agricultural employment in the town, and also had several shops. The water-powered industries suffered due to reduced waterflows after the Northampton Reservoir was built in 1901, and most of the buildings were gone by the 1920s.

== See also ==
- National Register of Historic Places listings in Franklin County, Massachusetts
- Whately Center Historic District
