= Whately Center Historic District =

Historic district in Massachusetts, United States

- U.S. National Register of Historic Places
- U.S. Historic district
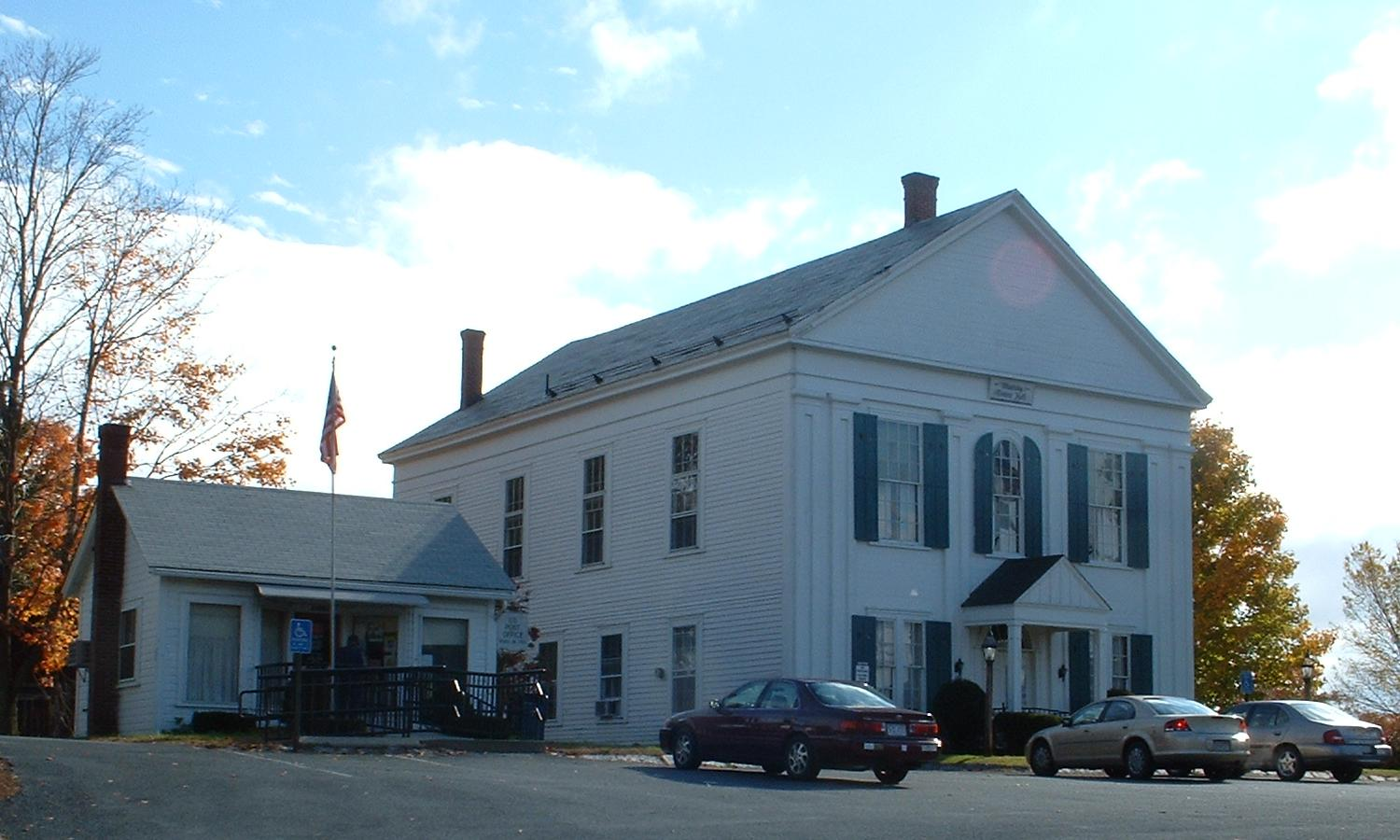
- Whately Town Hall

- Location within Massachusetts Location within the United States
- Location: Chestnut Plain and Haydenville Rds., Whately, Massachusetts
- Coordinates: 42°26′18″N 72°38′9″W
- Area: 201 acres (81 ha)
- Architect: Isaac Damon et al.
- Architectural style: Georgian, Federal
- NRHP reference No.: 03000920
- Added to NRHP: September 11, 2003

The Whately Center Historic District encompasses the historic rural village center of Whately, Massachusetts. Located in the hills west of the Connecticut River and north of Northampton, the district consists of a stretch of Chestnut Plain Road, the main north-south route through the village, and a short stretch of Haydenville Road, which is roughly at the center of the district. There are many fine homes from the Federal period, although they often have embellishments from later periods. Greek Revival architecture is also a major presence, with numerous houses, as well as the town's civic centerpieces, the town hall (c. 1844) and Second Congregational Church (c. 1843), showing that style. There are only a modest number of 20th-century structures in the district bounds. The district was listed on the National Register of Historic Places in 2003.

The area that is now Whately was Native American land until its purchase by English colonists from Hatfield in the late 17th century. Some farming took place then, but settlement was delayed by King Philip's War (1675–78). A land division in 1684 included provision for what is now Chestnut Plain Road, but settlement remained slow, with many early homes surrounded by wooden palisades. The archaeological remains of one such palisaded homestead remain in Whately Center. The town was separately incorporated in 1771, the date the center cemetery and its surviving animal pound were established. Only one house, the c. 1760 Morton House at 207 Chestnut Plain Road, predates the town's incorporation.

== See also ==
- National Register of Historic Places listings in Franklin County, Massachusetts
- West Whately Historic District
