= Sunderland Bridge (Massachusetts) =

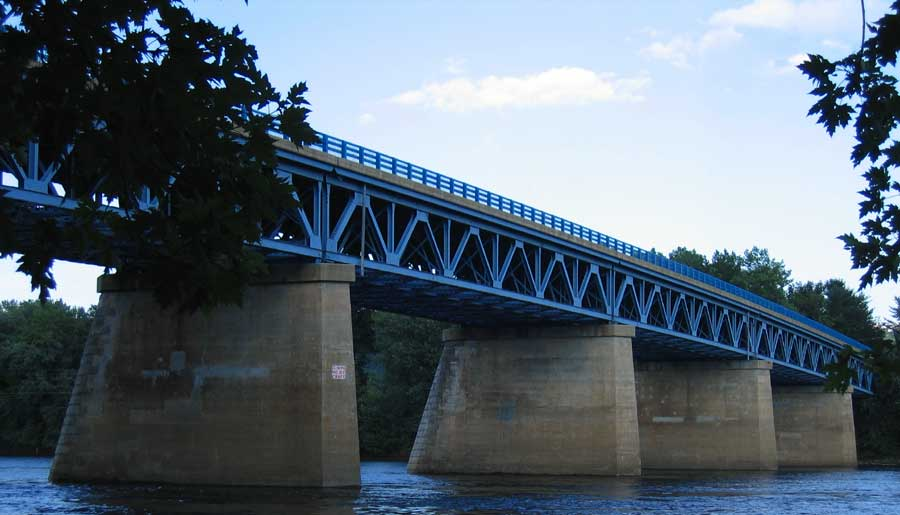
- Coordinates: 42°28′03″N 72°35′06″W
- Crosses: Connecticut River
- Locale: South Deerfield, Massachusetts to Sunderland, Massachusetts

Characteristics
- Design: deck truss
- Total length: 1,177 ft (358.7 m)

The Sunderland Bridge is a crossing over the Connecticut River in western Massachusetts, connecting the towns of South Deerfield and Sunderland, carrying Massachusetts Route 116.

== History and construction of the bridge ==
There was at least one preceding bridge at this location, a metal through-truss bridge destroyed by the floating Montague City Covered Bridge during the Flood of 1936.

The current Sunderland Bridge is a deck truss bridge completed in 1937. Reconstruction of the bridge was completed in 1994. Replacement of the original art deco railings by modern ones was controversial.

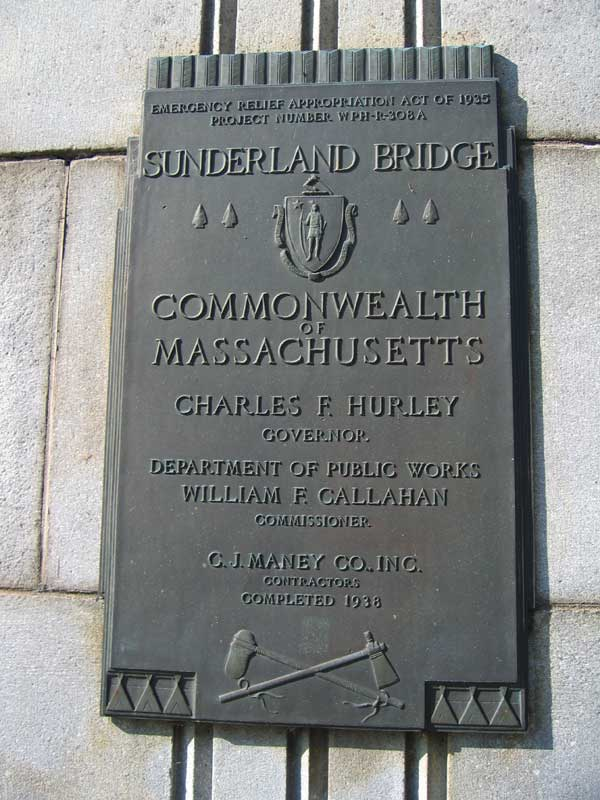
Dedication plaque

== See also ==
- List of crossings of the Connecticut River
