= Student Hosteling Program =

Student Hosteling Program is a Conway, Massachusetts based bicycle touring company offering trips in the United States and Europe. In 2010 it was 39 years old. Recording artist David Wilcox was a trip leader during his college years. A summer camp alternative, programs have been offered for 7th through 12th graders. Trips offer touring experiences in various areas.
