= St. Stanislaus Bishop & Martyr's Church (South Deerfield, Massachusetts) =

St. Stanislaus Bishop & Martyr Parish
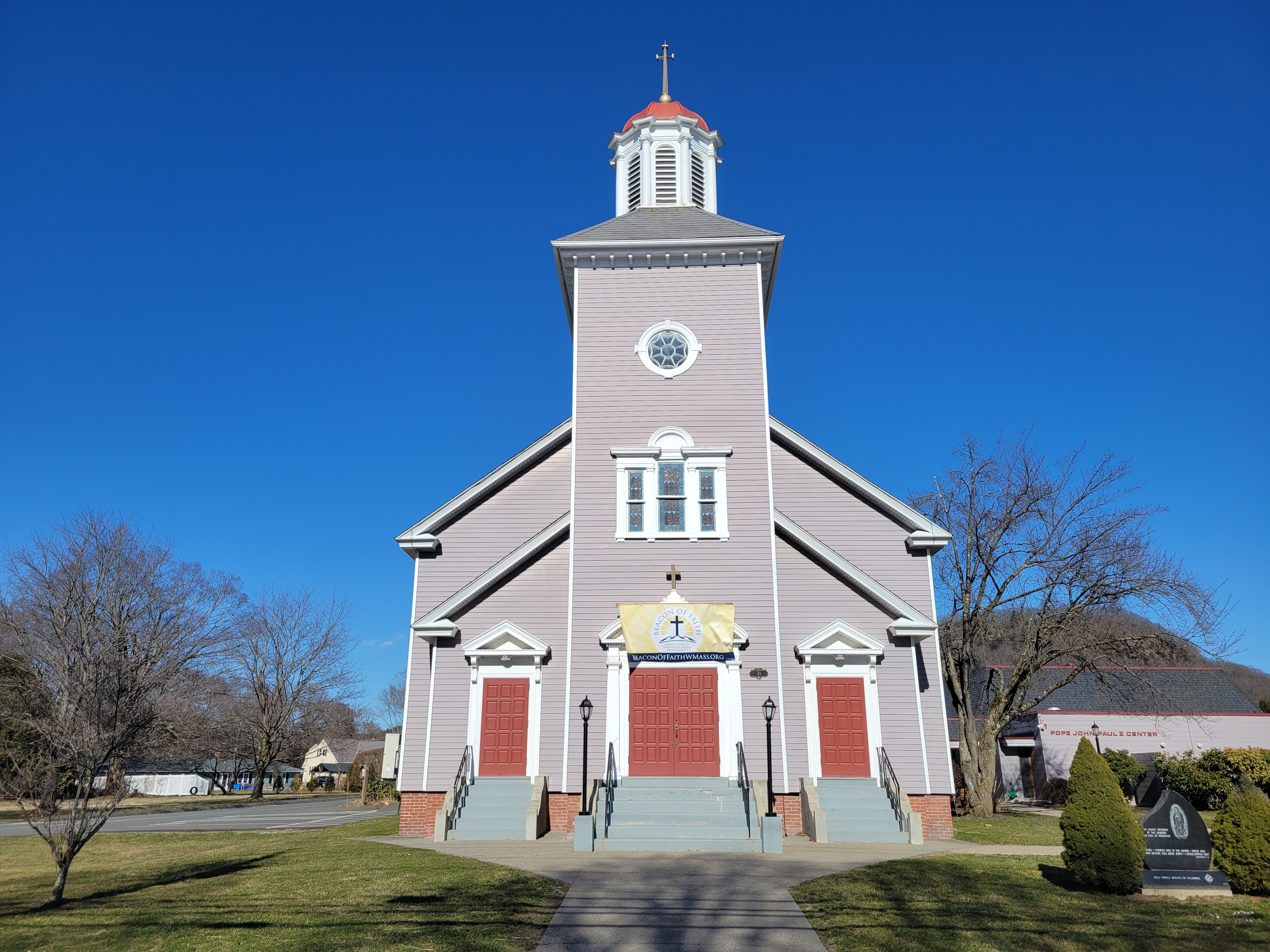
- Holy Family Roman Catholic Church
- St. Stanislaus Bishop & Martyr Parish
- 42°28′30″N 72°36′17.6″W
- Location: 29 Sugarloaf Street; South Deerfield, Massachusetts
- Country: United States
- Denomination: Roman Catholic
- Website: www.holyfamilysd.org

History
- Founded: 1908
- Founder: Polish immigrants
- Dedication: St. Stanislaus Bishop & Martyr

Administration
- Division: Region 4
- Province: Boston
- Diocese: Springfield in Massachusetts
- Parish: Holy Family Parish

Clergy
- Priest: Rev. Jon Reardon

St. Stanislaus Bishop & Martyr's Church is a church designated for Polish immigrants in South Deerfield, Massachusetts, United States. Founded 1908, it is one of the Polish-American Roman Catholic parishes in New England in the Diocese of Springfield in Massachusetts.

The Parish name was changed in 2009 to Holy Family Parish, to accommodate the pastoral planning project of the Bishop of Springfield, Timothy McDonnell.

== Bibliography ==
- The 150th Anniversary of Polish-American Pastoral Ministry. Webster, Massachusetts: St. Joseph Basilica. September 11, 2005.
- The Official Catholic Directory in USA
