= Union 38 School District =

School district in Massachusetts, United States

Union 38

Location
- 219 Christian Lane, Whately, MA 01093
- Coordinates: 42°26′47″N 72°35′43″W

District information
- Type: Public
- Superintendent: Lynn Carey

Other information
- Website: www.frsu38.org

Union 38 is a school district that serves Franklin County, Massachusetts. It operates 5 schools, 4 of which are elementary schools, and one regional high school.

== About ==
Frontier Regional and Union 38 School District are located in rural Western Massachusetts. Approximately 1,700 students are enrolled PreK-12. The district employs approximately 180 certified personnel and a support staff of about 140 (including our Before and After School Programs, Daybreak, Full-Day Preschool and Frontier Extension Programs). Occupying four new buildings, the Union #38 School District (PreK-6) serves the towns of Conway, Deerfield, Sunderland and Whately. Each town is governed by a local school committee. The Frontier Regional School District (grades 7–12) completed its building project in September 1998 and is governed by a separate nine member school committee. Approximately 85% of the graduates pursue a two-year or four year post secondary education.

== Schools ==
- Frontier Regional School
- Deerfield Elementary School (DES)
- Conway Grammar School
- Sunderland Elementary School
- Whately Elementary School
