= Conway, Massachusetts =

Town in Massachusetts, United States

- Town
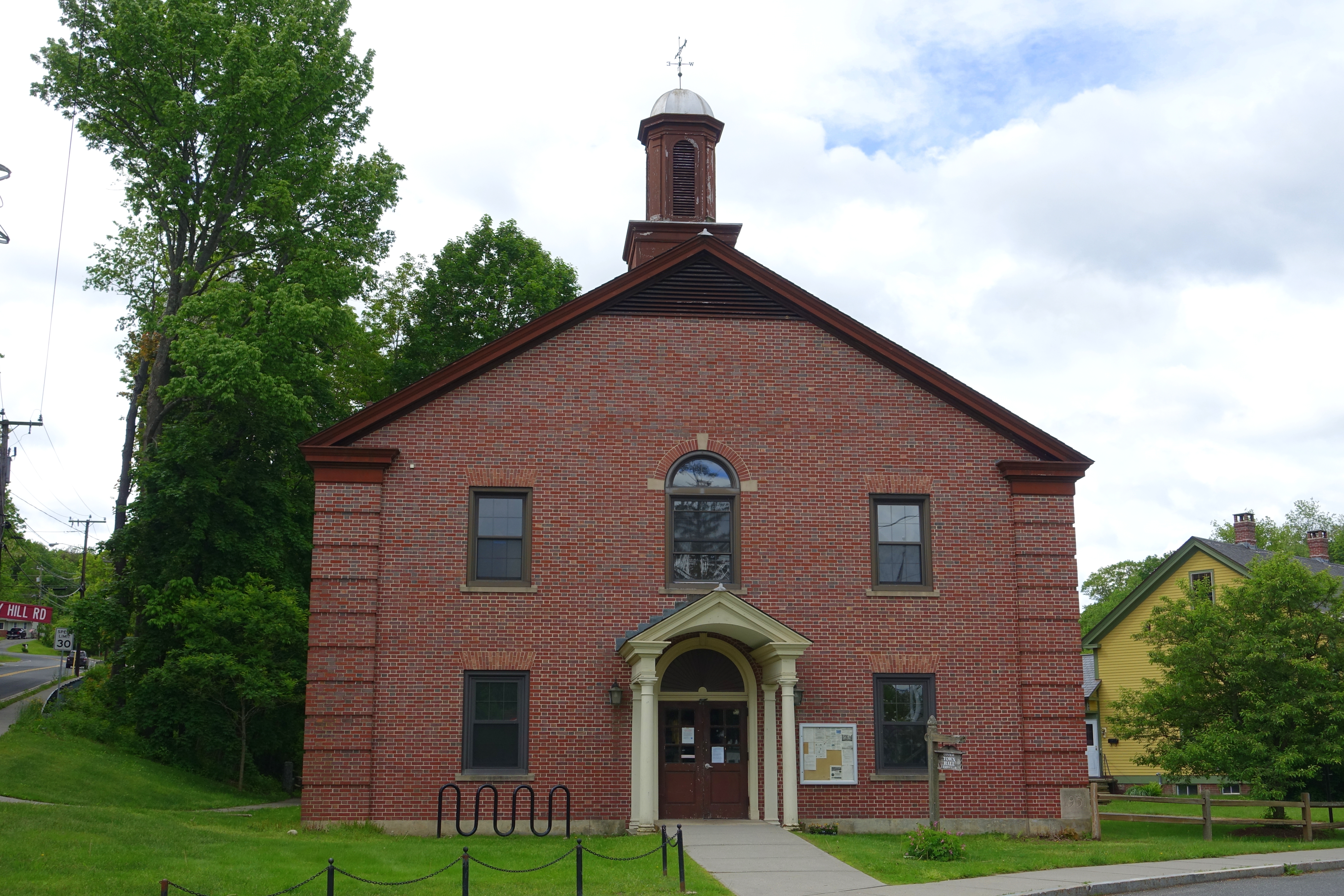
- Conway Town Hall

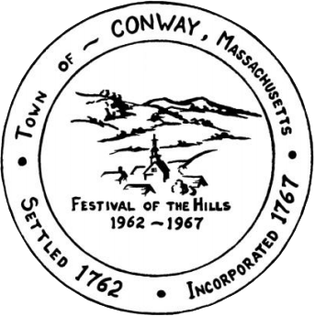
- Seal

- Location in Franklin County in Massachusetts
- Coordinates: 42°30′35″N 72°42′00″W
- Country: United States
- State: Massachusetts
- County: Franklin
- Settled: 1762
- Incorporated: 1767

Government
  - Type: Open town meeting

Area
  - Total: 37.9 sq mi (98.1 km^{2})
  - Land: 37.7 sq mi (97.6 km^{2})
  - Water: 0.19 sq mi (0.5 km^{2})
- Elevation: 673 ft (205 m)

Population (2020)
  - Total: 1,761
  - Density: 46.7/sq mi (18.0/km^{2})
- Time zone: UTC−5 (Eastern)
  - Summer (DST): UTC−4 (Eastern)
- ZIP Codes: 01341 (Conway); 01096 (Williamsburg); 01370 (Shelburne Falls)
- Area code: 413
- FIPS code: 25-15200
- GNIS feature ID: 0618161
- Website: conwayma.gov

Conway is a town in Franklin County, Massachusetts, United States. The population was 1,761 at the 2020 census. It is part of the Springfield, Massachusetts Metropolitan Statistical Area.

== History ==
English colonists first settled Conway in 1762 as the southwestern portion of the Town of Deerfield. The town was eventually separated and was officially incorporated in 1767. The town was named after General Henry Seymour Conway, a leader in the British House of Commons during the repeal of the Stamp Act. (Conway, New Hampshire, as well as other towns across the country, were also named for him.) The town was known for its sheep farming and other agrarian pursuits in its early years, with some industry along the South River. This was washed out in a dam break in 1869. Today the town is primarily a farming community.

Bardwell's Ferry Bridge, built in 1882, is an historic lenticular truss bridge spanning the Deerfield River between Conway and Shelburne. Today it is listed on the National Register of Historic Places. The town's Field Memorial Library was donated by native son Marshall Field in honor of his parents. It was designed by architects Shepley, Rutan and Coolidge, and completed in 1901.

On February 25, 2017, an EF1 tornado touched down in Conway. The tornado caused significant damage to localized areas. It was the first tornado in the month of February in Massachusetts' recorded history.

== Geography ==
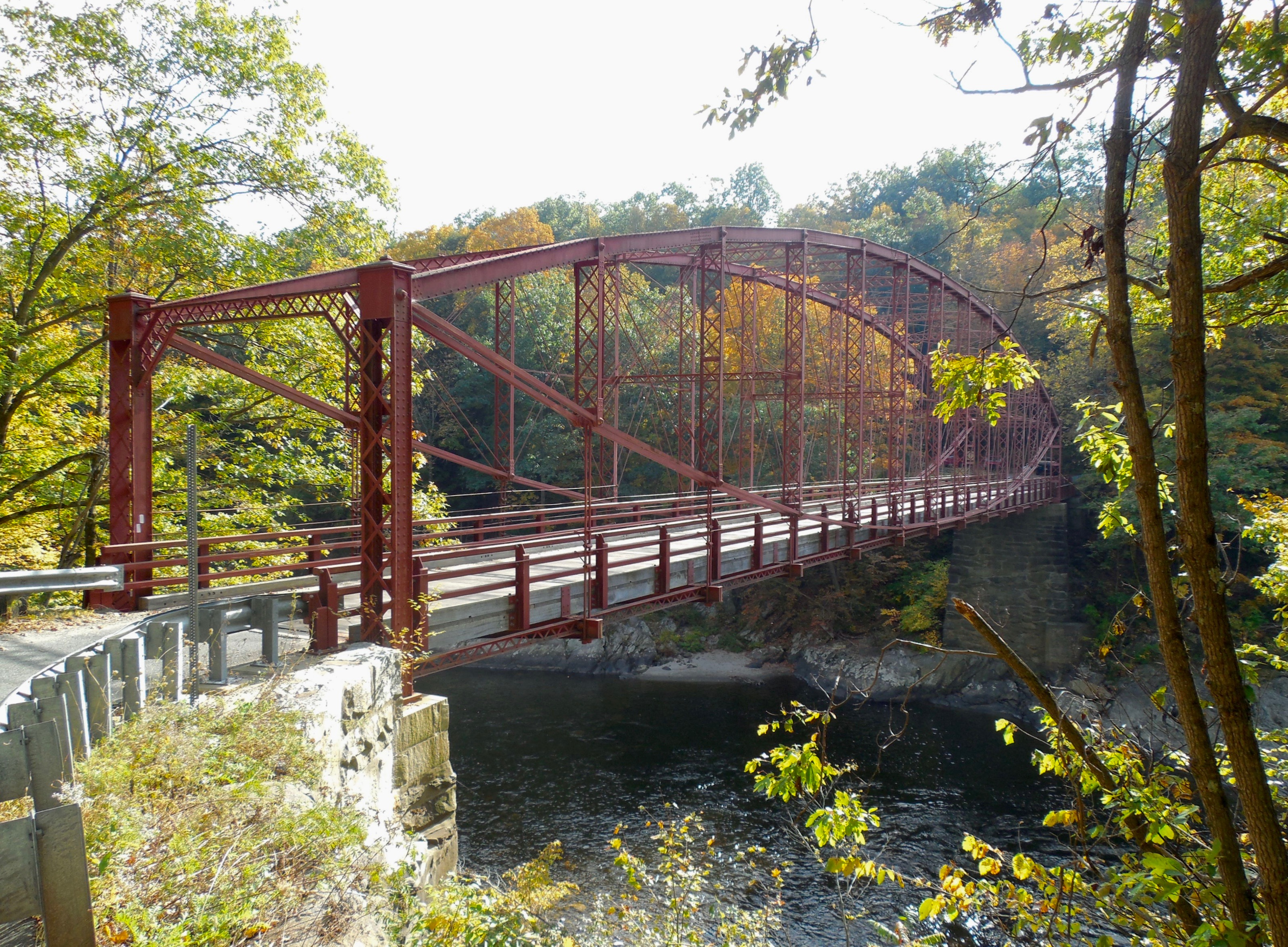
Historic Bardwell's Ferry Bridge

According to the United States Census Bureau, the town has a total area of 37.9 square miles (98.1 km^{2}), of which 37.7 square miles (97.6 km^{2}) is land and 0.19 square miles (0.5 km^{2}), or 0.47%, is water. Conway is in the central part of the county, and is bordered by Shelburne to the north, Deerfield to the east, Whately to the southeast, Williamsburg to the south, Goshen to the southwest, Ashfield to the west, and Buckland to the northwest. Included within the town boundaries are the historic neighborhoods of Burkville and Shirkshire. Conway is 10 miles (16 km) southwest of Greenfield, 32 miles (51 km) north-northwest of Springfield, and 99 miles (159 km) west-northwest of Boston.

Conway lies south of the Deerfield River, which comprises most of its northern border. The Bardwell's Ferry Bridge connects Conway to Shelburne across the Deerfield River. The town lies along the South River, which flows from Ashfield to the Deerfield River through the town, with many brooks feeding it as well as the nearby Mill River through Deerfield. The town is dotted with forests and hills, and is home to several state forests, including Conway State Forest, South River State Forest, and the Poland Brook State Wildlife Management Area.

Massachusetts Route 116 passes through the center of town, from Ashfield in the east towards Deerfield, along its way towards Springfield. Deerfield also has the nearest exits of Interstate 91, the nearest interstate highway to the town. A stretch of freight rail passes through the northern part of town, along the banks of the Deerfield River, between Deerfield and the Hoosac Tunnel to the west. The nearest passenger rail service can be reached at the Amtrak station in Greenfield, with the nearest bus service in Deerfield. The nearest small airport is in Turners Falls, with the nearest national air service being at Bradley International Airport in Windsor Locks, Connecticut.

== Demographics ==
Historical population
Year	Pop.	±%
1776	905	—
1790	2,092	+131.2%
1840	1,394	−33.4%
1850	1,831	+31.3%
1860	1,689	−7.8%
1870	1,460	−13.6%
1880	1,760	+20.5%
1890	1,451	−17.6%
1900	1,458	+0.5%
1910	1,230	−15.6%
1920	961	−21.9%
1930	900	−6.3%
1940	944	+4.9%
1950	873	−7.5%
1960	875	+0.2%
1970	998	+14.1%
1980	1,213	+21.5%
1990	1,529	+26.1%
2000	1,809	+18.3%
2010	1,897	+4.9%
2020	1,761	−7.2%
2022	1,760	−0.1%
Source: United States census records and Population Estimates Program data.

As of the census of 2000, there were 1,809 people, 692 households, and 512 families residing in the town. By population, Conway ranked twelfth of the twenty-six towns in Franklin County, and 295th of the 351 cities and towns in Massachusetts. The population density was 48.0 inhabitants per square mile (18.5/km^{2}), which ranked sixteenth in the county and 312th in the Commonwealth. There were 749 housing units at an average density of 19.9 per square mile (7.7/km^{2}). The racial makeup of the town was 98.73% White, 0.17% African American, 0.22% Native American, 0.50% Asian, 0.11% from other races, and 0.28% from two or more races. Hispanic or Latino of any race were 0.94% of the population.

There were 692 households, out of which 36.3% had children under the age of 18 living with them, 61.4% were married couples living together, 9.0% had a female householder with no husband present, and 25.9% were non-families. Of all households, 18.8% were made up of individuals, and 5.2% had someone living alone who was 65 years of age or older. The average household size was 2.61 and the average family size was 3.01.

In the town, the population was spread out, with 25.2% under the age of 18, 5.3% from 18 to 24, 28.9% from 25 to 44, 31.2% from 45 to 64, and 9.5% who were 65 years of age or older. The median age was 40 years. For every 100 females, there were 97.9 males. For every 100 females age 18 and over, there were 96.2 males.

The median income for a household in the town was $56,094, and the median income for a family was $62,917. Males had a median income of $41,146 versus $32,273 for females. The per capita income for the town was $25,605. About 2.5% of families and 3.5% of the population were below the poverty line, including 2.6% of those under age 18 and 4.0% of those age 65 or over.

== Government ==
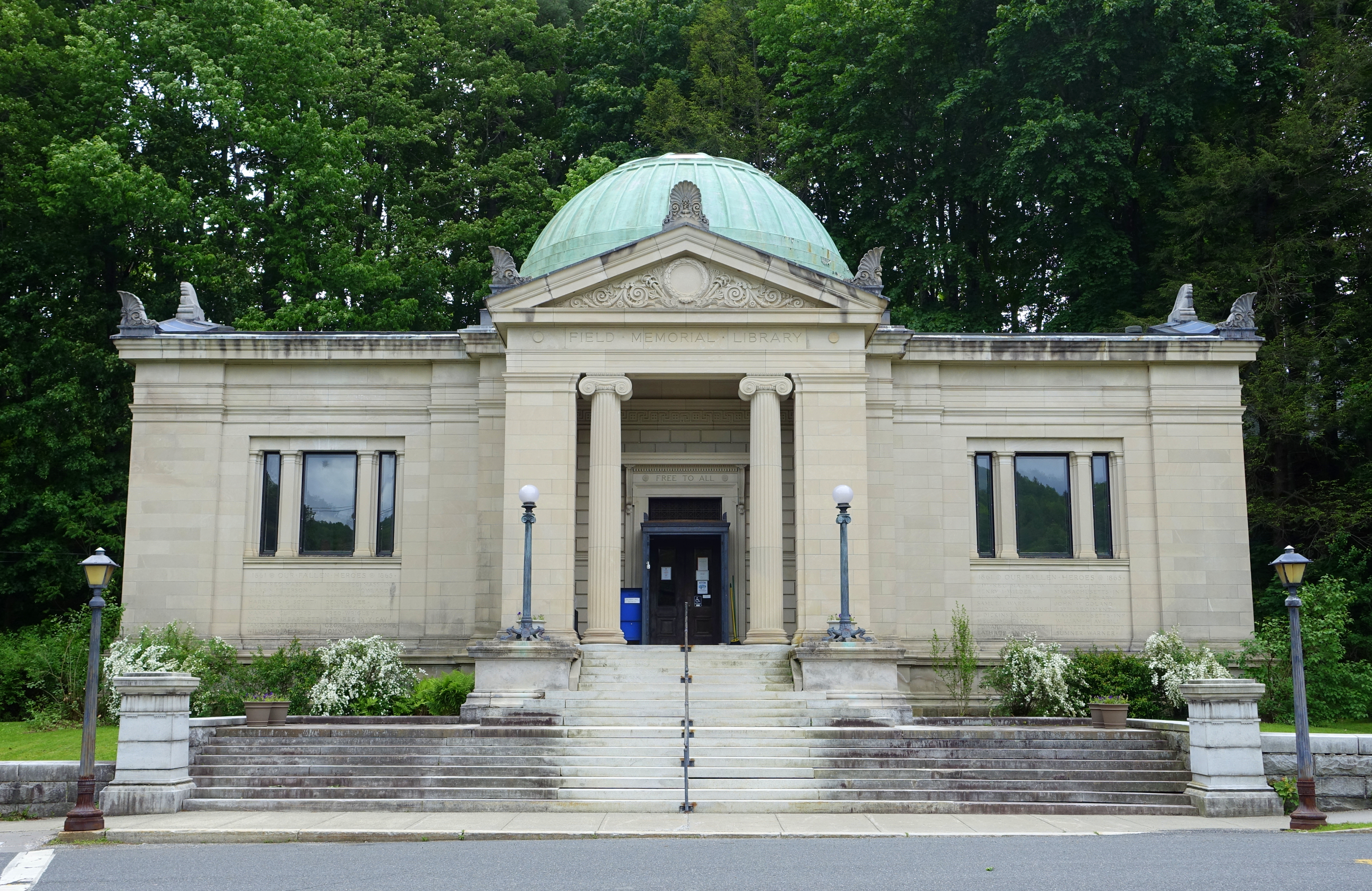
Field Memorial Library

Conway employs the open town meeting form of government, and is led by a board of selectmen and a Town Administrator. The town offices, police station, fire station, post office and Field Memorial Library (donated to the town by Marshall Field and named for his family) are all located in the center of town. The nearest hospital, Franklin Medical Center, is located in Greenfield, as are most of the nearest state offices.

On the state level, Conway is represented in the Massachusetts House of Representatives by the First Franklin district, which includes the southeastern third of Franklin County and towns in north central Hampshire County. In the Massachusetts Senate, the town is represented by the Berkshire, Hampshire and Franklin district, which includes all of Berkshire County, as well as much of western Franklin and Hampshire Counties. The town is patrolled by the Second (Shelburne Falls) Barracks of Troop "B" of the Massachusetts State Police.

On the national level, Conway is part of Massachusetts's 2nd congressional district, and has been represented in the US Congress by House Rep Jim McGovern (D). Massachusetts is currently represented in the United States Senate by Senators Ed Markey and Elizabeth Warren.

== Education ==
Conway is a member of Frontier Regional and Union 38 School District, which also includes Deerfield, Whately and Sunderland. Each town operates its own elementary school, with Conway Grammar School serving the town's students from kindergarten through sixth grades. All four towns send seventh through twelfth grade students to Frontier Regional High School in Deerfield. There are several private, religious and charter schools located in the Greenfield and Deerfield area, with the nearest being the Deerfield Academy.

The nearest community college, Greenfield Community College, is located in Greenfield. The nearest state colleges are Massachusetts College of Liberal Arts in North Adams, and the nearest state universities are Westfield State University and the University of Massachusetts Amherst. The nearest private colleges, including members of the Five Colleges and Seven Sisters, are located southeast in the Northampton area.

== Notable people ==
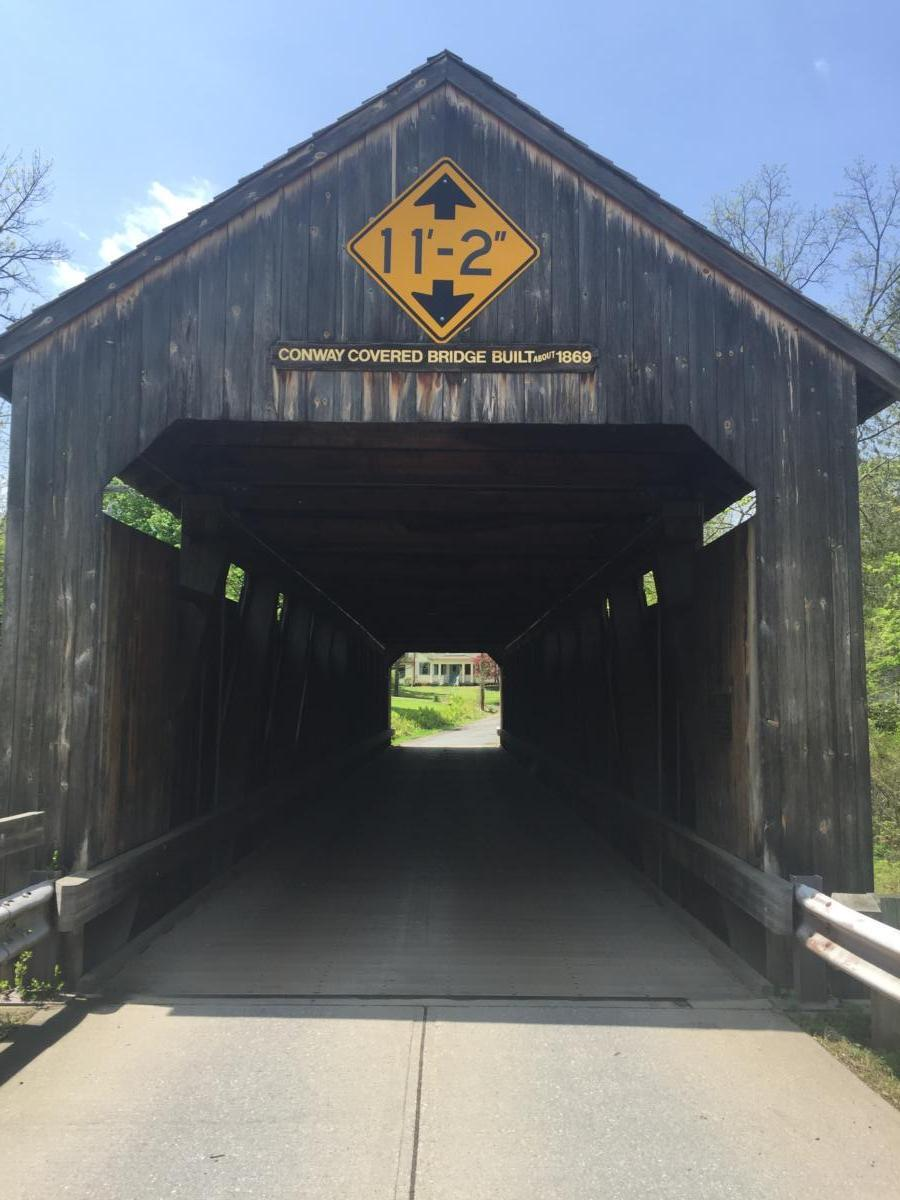
Conway Covered Bridge (2018)

- Brian Bram, illustrator for Harvey Pekar's American Splendor
- Jack Chesbro, Hall of Fame pitcher, retired and died here
- John Crowley, author
- Marshall Field, Marshall Field and Company founder
- Moses Hayden, former US Congressman
- Holly Hobbie, author of children's books
- Archibald MacLeish, Pulitzer Prize winning poet, Librarian of Congress
- Socrates Nelson, Minnesota State Senator
- Hortense May Orcutt, educator
- William Collins Whitney, financier, Secretary of the Navy 1885–1889
- Austin Eli Wing, Michigan politician

== See also ==
- Student Hosteling Program
