= Whately, Massachusetts =

- Town
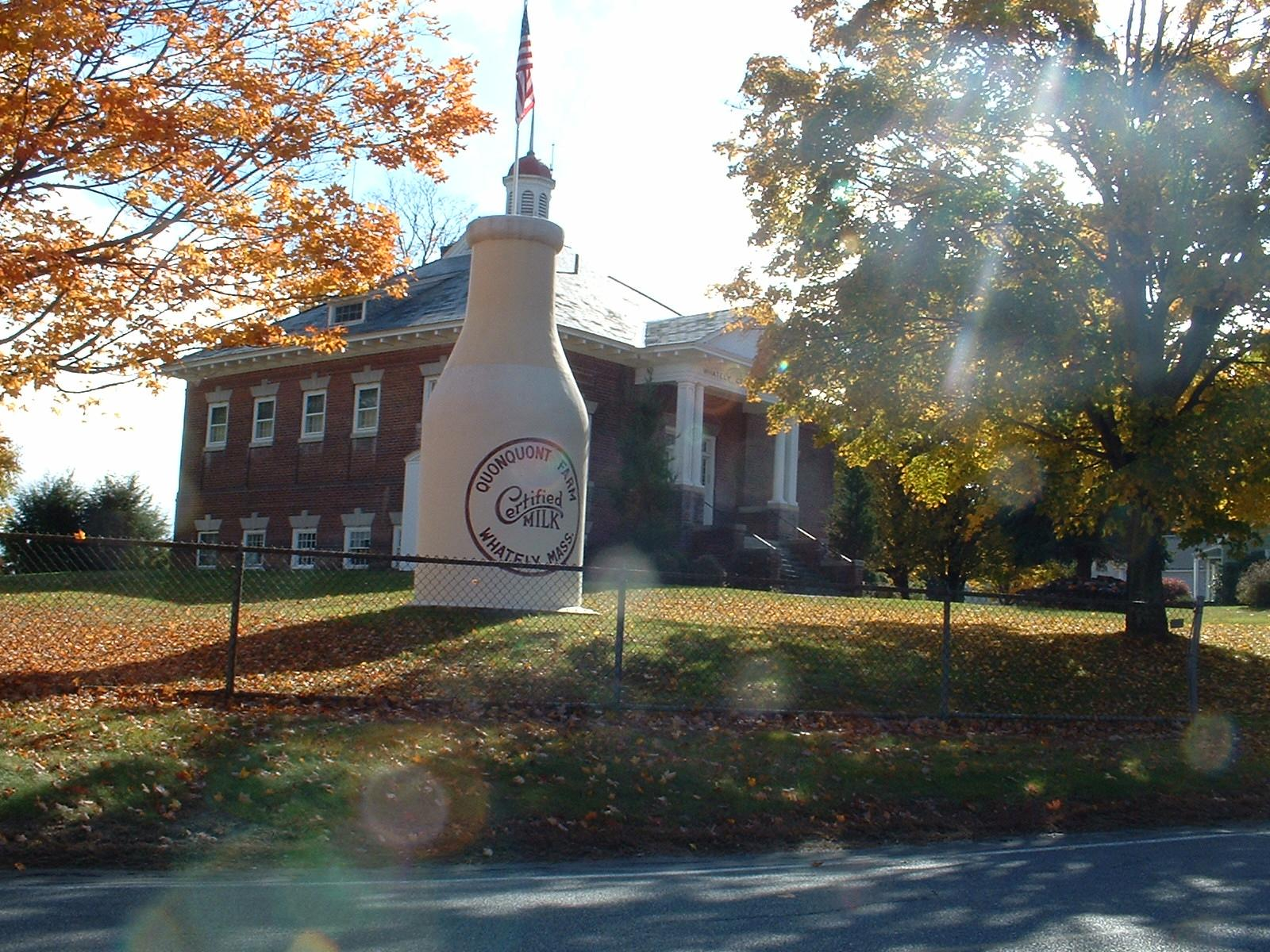
- The "Whately Milk Bottle" in front of the old Whately Central School (built 1910)

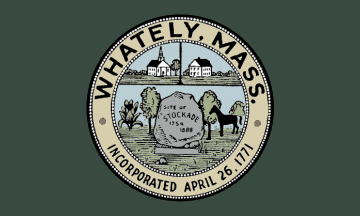
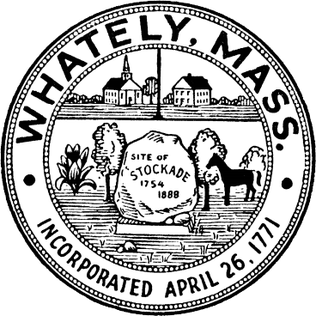
- Flag Seal

- Location in Franklin County in Massachusetts
- Coordinates: 42°26′N 72°38′W
- Country: United States
- State: Massachusetts
- County: Franklin
- Settled: 1672
- Incorporated: 1771

Government
  - Type: Open town meeting

Area
  - Total: 20.7 sq mi (53.5 km^{2})
  - Land: 20.2 sq mi (52.3 km^{2})
  - Water: 0.46 sq mi (1.2 km^{2})
- Elevation: 381 ft (116 m)

Population (2020)
  - Total: 1,607
  - Density: 79.6/sq mi (30.7/km^{2})
- Time zone: UTC−5 (Eastern)
  - Summer (DST): UTC−4 (Eastern)
- ZIP Codes: 01093 (Whately); 01039 (Haydenville); 01373 (South Deerfield)
- Area code: 413
- FIPS code: 25-79110
- GNIS feature ID: 1729674
- Website: www.whately.org

Whately (/ˈhweɪtli/; WAIT-lee) is a town in Franklin County, Massachusetts, United States. The population was 1,607 at the 2020 census. It is part of the Springfield, Massachusetts Metropolitan Statistical Area.

== History ==
Whately was first settled in 1672 as a northern section of Hatfield. The town peaceably petitioned for separation from the town because of its relatively long distance from the rest of Hatfield, and was officially incorporated in 1771, named by Governor Thomas Hutchinson for Thomas Whately, a Member of Parliament whose letter to Hutchinson would later be involved in the controversy which brought on Hutchinson's dismissal. Julian Whately, a descendant of Thomas, visited the town during the Bicentennial celebration in 1971. Whately was the site of the state's first gin distillery, as well as other small mills, including wool and furniture mills. The town also used the water in town for agricultural pursuits, including dairying and one of the few Sumatran tobacco fields outside of Indonesia.

== Geography ==
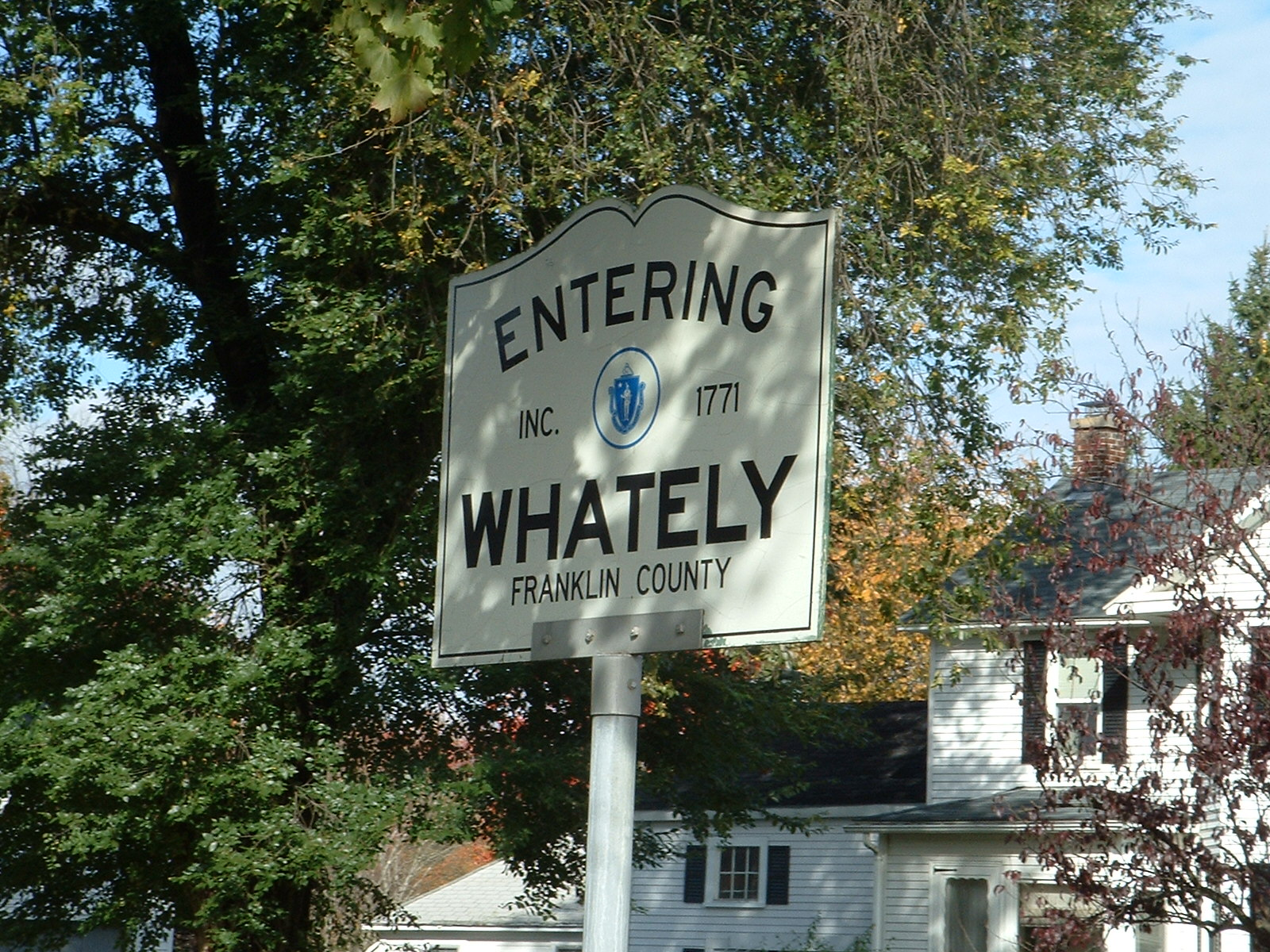
Entering Whately – Franklin County

According to the United States Census Bureau, the town has a total area of 20.7 square miles (54 km^{2}), of which 20.2 square miles (52 km^{2}) is land and 0.5 square miles (1.3 km^{2}), or 2.32%, is water. Whately lies along the southern border of the county, north of Hampshire County, and is bordered by Conway to the northwest, Deerfield to the northeast, Sunderland to the east, Hatfield to the south, and Williamsburg to the west. Whately is located 11 miles (18 km) south of Greenfield, 26 miles (42 km) north of Springfield, and 95 miles (153 km) west of Boston.

Whately lies along the western banks of the Connecticut River in the Pioneer Valley. The western part of town is hilly, with the highest point being the 980-foot (300 m) Mount Esther. East of the hills, the Mill River flows through town, with some swampland to the east between it and the Great Swamp Brook, a tributary which meets in the town. There is more marshy land in the southeast of town, closer to the Connecticut, and some small ponds between the two. Much of the land around the two rivers is cleared for farmland.

Whately is crossed by Interstate 91, which passes from north to south in the town, and is accessed at Exit 23 by U.S. Route 5 and the concurrently-running Massachusetts Route 10. The combined routes run roughly parallel to the interstate, crossing it twice in the town. In the north of town, a short, 200-yard stretch of Route 116 follows the same road as Routes 5 & 10 before another 400-yard stretch heads east back into the town of Deerfield, a result of the realignment of the route due to the building of the interstate. Whately shared the Pilgrim Airport, a small, general aviation airport, with neighboring Hatfield, but the field was closed and is currently used as farmland. The nearest general aviation airport is Northampton Airport, with the nearest national air service being at Bradley International Airport in Windsor Locks, Connecticut.

== Demographics ==
Historical population
Year	Pop.	±%
1790	736	—
1850	1,101	+49.6%
1860	1,057	−4.0%
1870	1,068	+1.0%
1880	1,074	+0.6%
1890	779	−27.5%
1900	769	−1.3%
1910	846	+10.0%
1920	1,234	+45.9%
1930	1,136	−7.9%
1940	979	−13.8%
1950	939	−4.1%
1960	1,037	+10.4%
1970	1,145	+10.4%
1980	1,341	+17.1%
1990	1,375	+2.5%
2000	1,573	+14.4%
2010	1,496	−4.9%
2020	1,607	+7.4%
2022	1,625	+1.1%
Source: United States census records and Population Estimates Program data.

As of the census of 2000, there were 1,573 people, 629 households, and 425 families residing in the town. By population, Whately ranked fifteenth of the twenty six towns in Franklin County, and 305th of the 351 cities and towns in Massachusetts. The population density was 78.0 inhabitants per square mile (30.1/km^{2}), which ranked twelfth in the county and 297th in the Commonwealth. There were 652 housing units at an average density of 32.3 per square mile (12.5/km^{2}). The racial makeup of the town was 97.97% White, 0.51% African American, 0.13% Native American, 0.51% Asian, 0.32% from other races, and 0.57% from two or more races. Hispanic or Latino of any race were 1.14% of the population.

There were 629 households, out of which 29.6% had children under the age of 18 living with them, 55.6% were married couples living together, 7.2% had a female householder with no husband present, and 32.4% were non-families. Of all households 23.5% were made up of individuals, and 8.6% had someone living alone who was 65 years of age or older. The average household size was 2.48 and the average family size was 2.96.

In the town, the population was spread out, with 21.8% under the age of 18, 6.1% from 18 to 24, 30.2% from 25 to 44, 29.6% from 45 to 64, and 12.3% who were 65 years of age or older. The median age was 41 years. For every 100 females, there were 100.9 males. For every 100 females age 18 and over, there were 101.3 males.

The median income for a household in the town was $58,929, and the median income for a family was $66,488. Males had a median income of $45,208 versus $28,177 for females. The per capita income for the town was $27,826. About 1.8% of families and 3.0% of the population were below the poverty line, including 1.8% of those under age 18 and 2.4% of those age 65 or over.

== Government ==
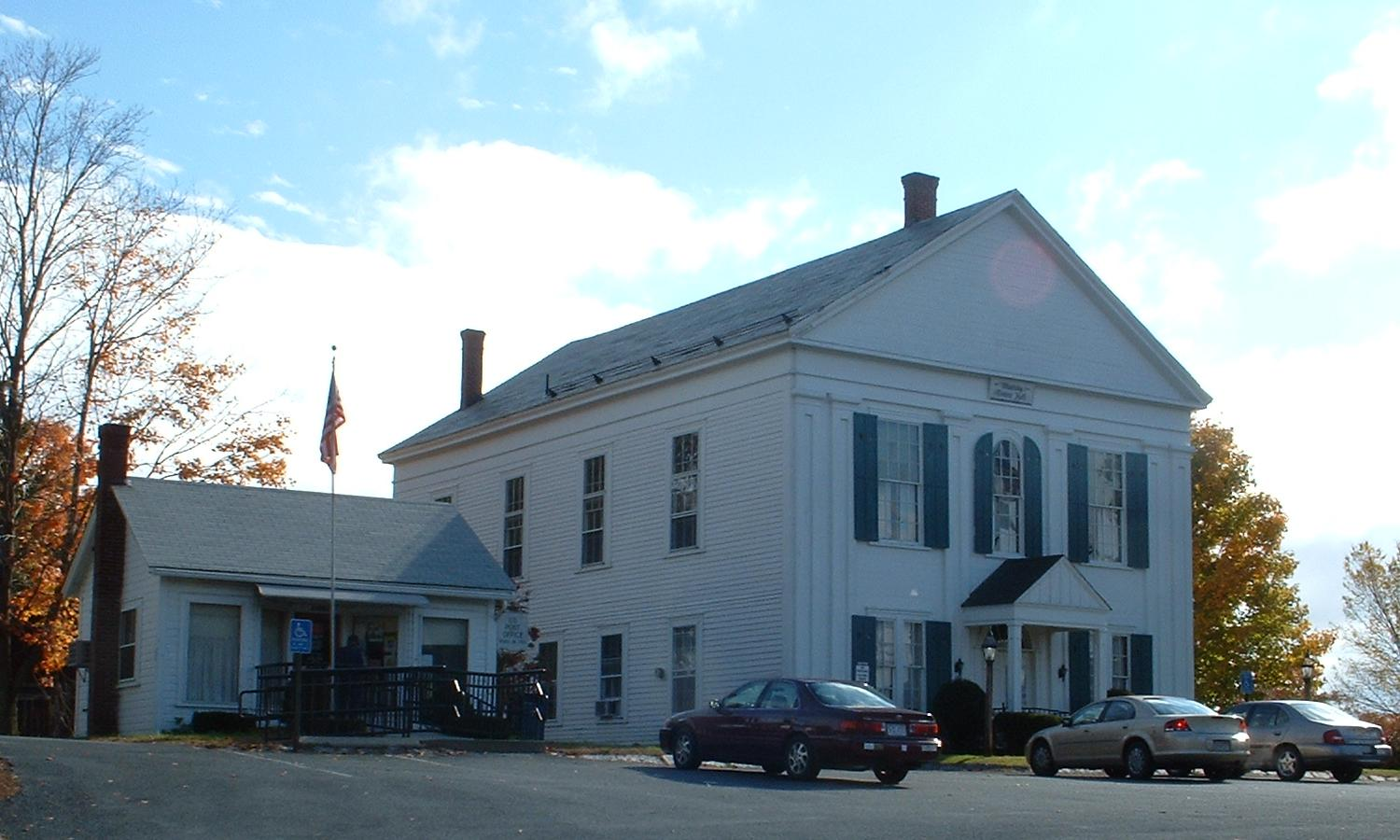
Whately Town Hall

Whately employs the open town meeting form of government, and is led by a board of selectmen and an administrative assistant. The town has its own police, fire and public works departments, as well as its own post office. While most state offices and the regional waste management area are based in Greenfield, the town is actually closer to Northampton, the former seat of Hampshire County. The nearest hospital is also in Northampton.

On the state level, Whately is represented in the Massachusetts House of Representatives by the First Franklin district, which includes the southeastern third of Franklin County and towns in north central Hampshire County. In the Massachusetts Senate, the town is represented by the Hampshire and Franklin district, which includes much of eastern Franklin and Hampshire Counties. The town is patrolled by the Whately Police Department, with backup from the Headquarters (Northampton) Barracks of Troop "B" of the Massachusetts State Police.

On the national level, Whately is represented in the United States House of Representatives as part of Massachusetts's 2nd congressional district, and is represented by Jim McGovern of Worcester. Massachusetts is represented in the United States Senate by senior Senator Elizabeth Warren and junior Senator Ed Markey.

== Education ==
Whately is a member of Frontier Regional and Union 38 School Districts, which also includes Conway, Deerfield and Sunderland. Each town operates its own elementary school, with Whately Elementary School serving the town's students from Pre-K through sixth grades. All four towns send seventh through twelfth grade students to Frontier Regional High School in Deerfield. There are several private schools in neighboring Deerfield, with more in the Greenfield and Northampton areas.

The nearest community college, Greenfield Community College, is located in Greenfield. The nearest state college is Westfield State University, and the nearest state university is the University of Massachusetts Amherst. The nearest private colleges, including members of the Five Colleges and Seven Sisters, are located southeast in the Northampton area.
