= General Pierce Bridge =

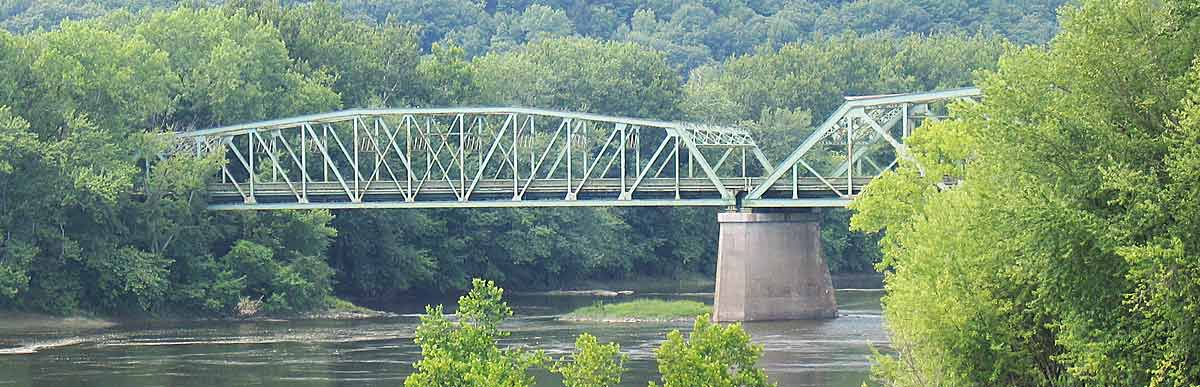
- General Pierce Bridge, taken from the Canalside Railtrail Bridge
- Coordinates: 42°34′49″N 72°34′47″W
- Carries: vehicular and pedestrian traffic
- Crosses: Connecticut River
- Locale: Greenfield and Montague, Massachusetts
- Maintained by: MassHighway
- ID number: G-12-020

Characteristics
- Design: steel truss bridge
- Total length: 229.5 m (753.0 ft)
- Width: 7.9 m (25.9 ft)

History
- Construction end: 1947

Statistics
- Daily traffic: 19,400

The General Pierce Bridge is a steel truss road bridge over the Connecticut River between Greenfield, Massachusetts and Montague, Massachusetts carrying Montague City Road.

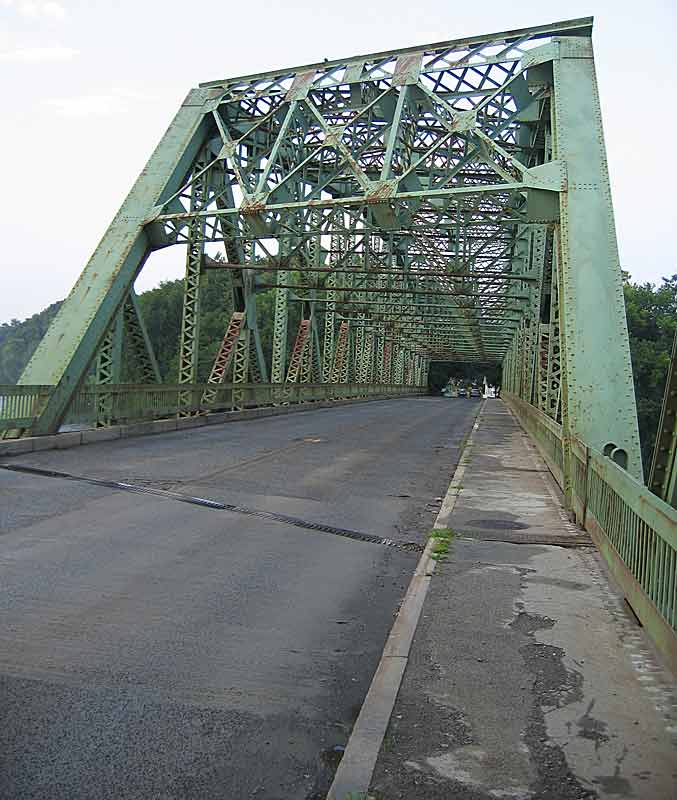
General Pierce Bridge, between spans facing northeast.

In summer 2021, the bridge was closed to vehicle traffic while undergoing major repairs but remained open for foot traffic. Originally expected to fully reopen in summer 2024, repairs had been completed ahead of schedule and the bridge completely reopened by the end of February 2023.

== Previous structures ==
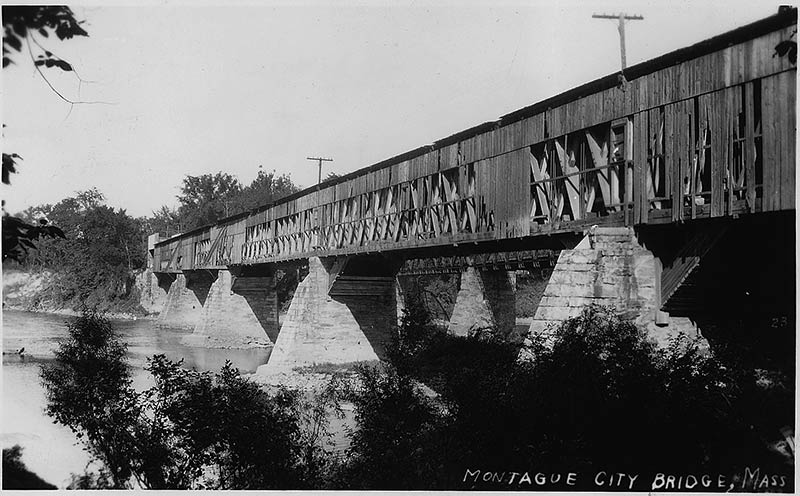
Montague City Bridge with the Trolley Bridge just visible behind it.

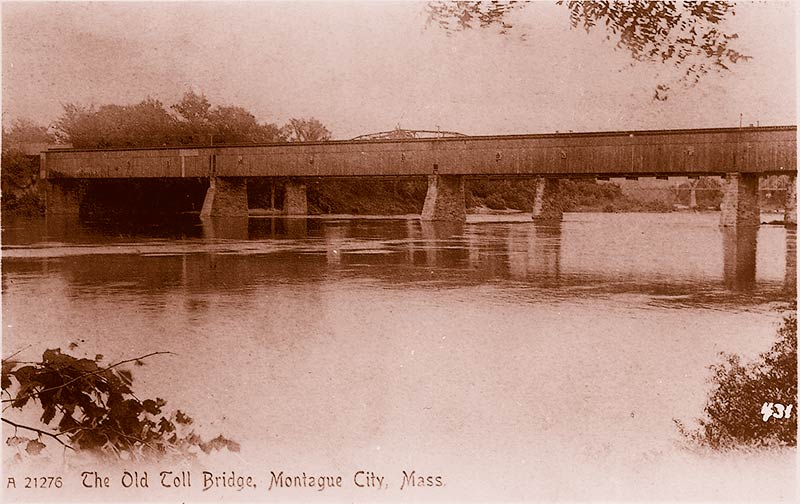
Earlier image of the covered bridge and the trolley bridge, with the New York, New Haven and Hartford Railroad Bridge (now known as the Canalside Railtrail Bridge) in the background

The current bridge was preceded at that location by two bridges destroyed in the Flood of 1936. Upstream was the wooden double-decked covered bridge known as the Montague City Bridge, and carried rail traffic on top, with other traffic below. It was built in 1866, and was over 860 feet (260 m) long, with 5 spans. Next was the trolley bridge, which was a metal through-truss.

When the Flood of 1936 came, the trolley bridge was knocked off its piers and sunk into the river, where it remains. The covered rail bridge floated down the river, where it knocked two spans off the New York, New Haven and Hartford Railroad Bridge (now known as the Canalside Rail Trail Bridge), then proceeded down the river to destroy the Sunderland Bridge.

== See also ==
- List of crossings of the Connecticut River

== External links and references ==
5.

https://www.constructionequipmentguide.com/northern-construction-service-to-preserve-renovate-restore-general-pierce-bridge/53398 By Joe R. Parzych AN FREELANCE PHOTOJOURNALIST of Joe R. Parzych Photography etc./ https://www.linkedin.com/in/joseph-parzych-04362515b
