= South Deerfield, Massachusetts =

- Census-designated place
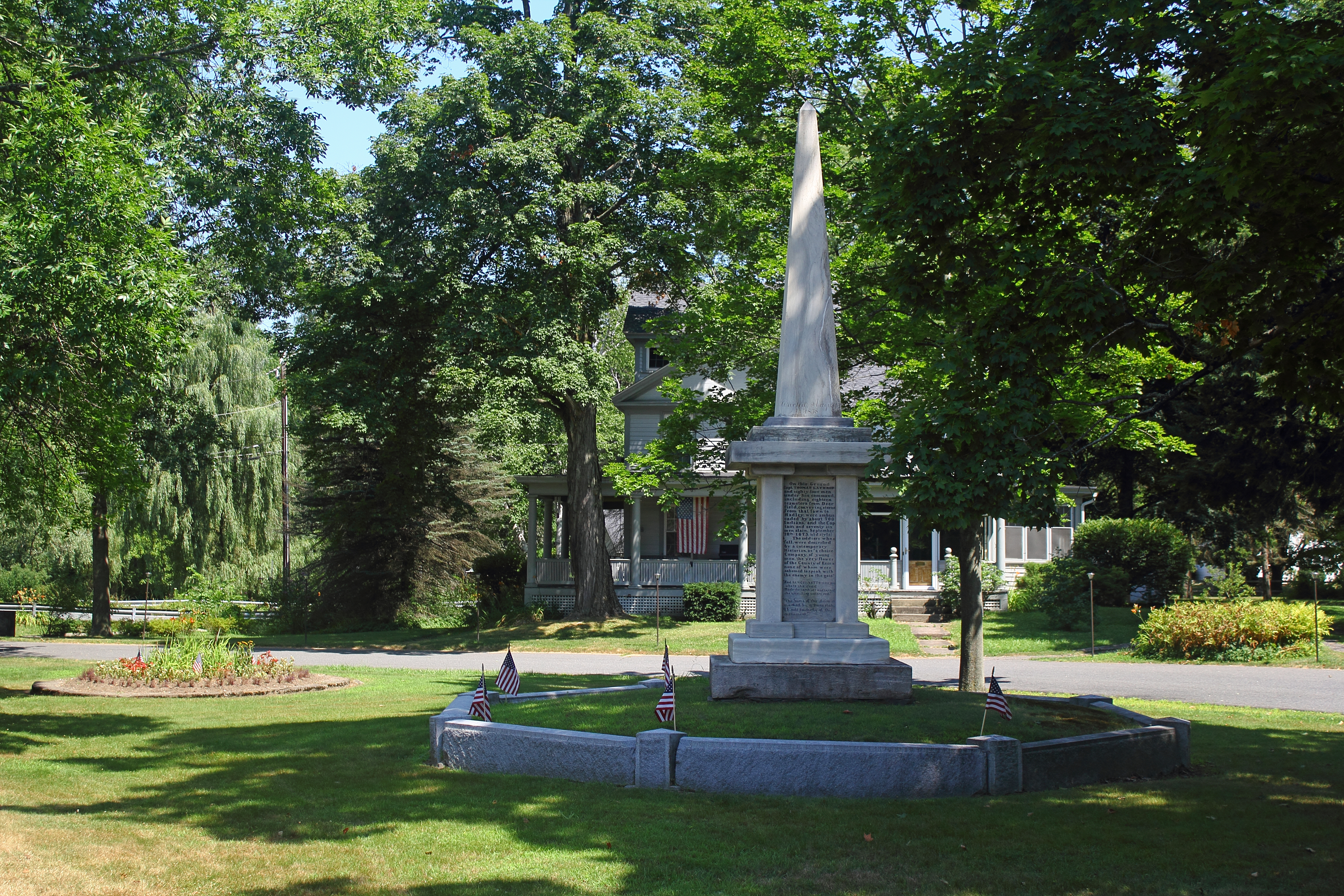
- Bloody Brook Monument, North Main Street

- Location in Franklin County in Massachusetts
- Coordinates: 42°28′37″N 72°36′2″W
- Country: United States
- State: Massachusetts
- County: Franklin
- Town: Deerfield

Area
  - Total: 3.26 sq mi (8.45 km^{2})
  - Land: 3.15 sq mi (8.17 km^{2})
  - Water: 0.11 sq mi (0.28 km^{2})
- Elevation: 203 ft (62 m)

Population (2020)
  - Total: 1,930
  - Density: 611.9/sq mi (236.24/km^{2})
- Time zone: UTC−5 (Eastern (EST))
  - Summer (DST): UTC−4 (EDT)
- ZIP Code: 01373
- Area code: 413
- FIPS code: 25-63620
- GNIS feature ID: 0608942
- Website: www.deerfieldma.us

South Deerfield is a census-designated place (CDP) in Deerfield, Franklin County, Massachusetts, United States. It is home to the Yankee Candle Company. As of the 2020 census, South Deerfield had a population of 1,930.

South Deerfield is part of the Springfield, Massachusetts Metropolitan Statistical Area.

== History ==
The area was once home to the Pocumtuck tribe, who were driven away by settlers relocated in 1673 from Dedham. In retaliation, on September 18, 1675, the Indians attacked and killed Captain Thomas Lathrop and a small force in the Battle of Bloody Brook before being routed by reinforcements. Thereafter called Bloody Brook or Muddy Brook, South Deerfield in 1809 attempted to be set off from Deerfield in part because of the distance to its meetinghouse and in part because of religious differences with its minister, the Reverend Samuel Willard. The grant was refused, and the village remained part of Deerfield, but South Deerfield nevertheless dedicated its own meetinghouse in 1821. Situated beside the Connecticut River, it developed as a small farming community.

There are a variety of retail and service establishments in South Deerfield, including a hardware store, a family restaurant, the Polish American Citizens Club, and a small brewery. The town's Tilton Library and Frontier Regional High School are also in South Deerfield.

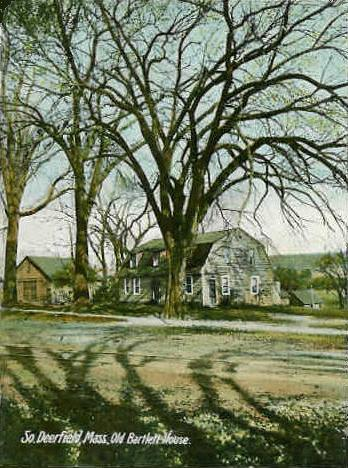
Bartlett House in 1910

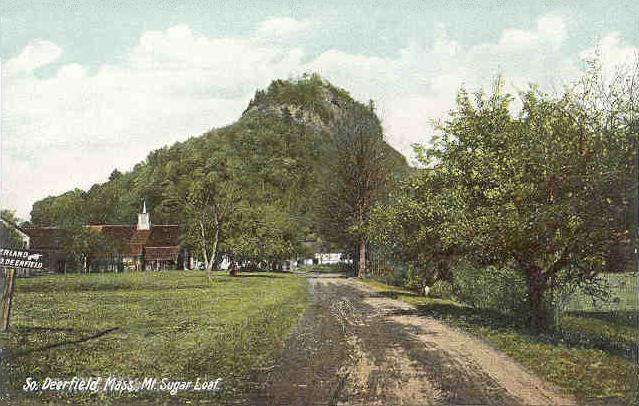
Mt. Sugarloaf in 1910

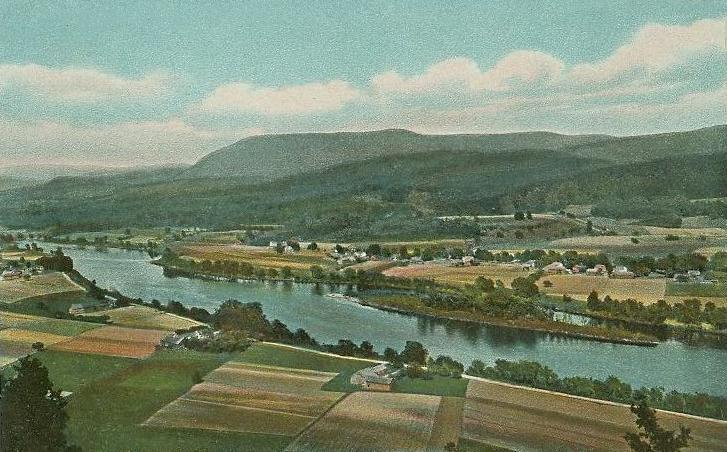
Connecticut River, c. 1910

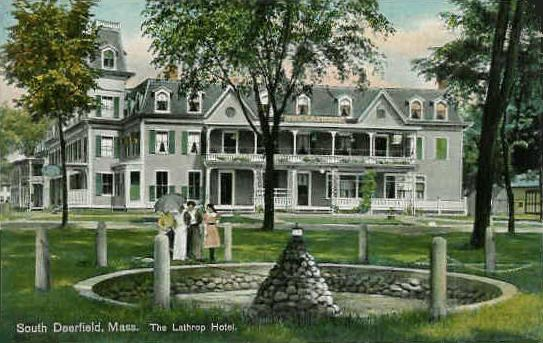
Lathrop Hotel in 1911

== Geography ==
South Deerfield is located at 42°28′37″N 72°36′02″W.

According to the United States Census Bureau, the CDP has a total area of 8.4 km^{2} (3.3 mi^{2}), of which 8.1 km^{2} (3.1 mi^{2}) is land and 0.3 km^{2} (0.1 mi^{2}) (3.37%) is water. South Deerfield is drained by the Deerfield and Connecticut rivers.

== Demographics ==
Historical population
Census	Pop.	Note	%±
2020	1,930		—
U.S. Decennial Census

=== 2020 census ===
As of the 2020 census, South Deerfield had a population of 1,930. The median age was 48.6 years. 15.9% of residents were under the age of 18 and 24.1% of residents were 65 years of age or older. For every 100 females there were 96.5 males, and for every 100 females age 18 and over there were 94.8 males age 18 and over.

99.6% of residents lived in urban areas, while 0.4% lived in rural areas.

There were 883 households in South Deerfield, of which 25.5% had children under the age of 18 living in them. Of all households, 43.5% were married-couple households, 20.0% were households with a male householder and no spouse or partner present, and 28.2% were households with a female householder and no spouse or partner present. About 31.8% of all households were made up of individuals and 13.8% had someone living alone who was 65 years of age or older.

There were 959 housing units, of which 7.9% were vacant. The homeowner vacancy rate was 0.7% and the rental vacancy rate was 2.6%.

Racial composition as of the 2020 census
Race	Number	Percent
White	1,729	89.6%
Black or African American	11	0.6%
American Indian and Alaska Native	8	0.4%
Asian	26	1.3%
Native Hawaiian and Other Pacific Islander	0	0.0%
Some other race	40	2.1%
Two or more races	116	6.0%
Hispanic or Latino (of any race)	98	5.1%

=== 2000 census ===
As of the census of 2000, there were 1,868 people, 821 households, and 490 families residing in the CDP. The population density was 229.7/km^{2} (594.3/mi^{2}). There were 869 housing units at an average density of 106.9/km^{2} (276.5/mi^{2}). The racial makeup of the CDP was 96.68% White, 0.80% African American, 0.16% Native American, 0.43% Asian, 0.86% from other races, and 1.07% from two or more races. Hispanic or Latino of any race were 2.25% of the population.

There were 821 households, out of which 22.2% had children under the age of 18 living with them, 49.1% were married couples living together, 7.6% had a female householder with no husband present, and 40.3% were non-families. 30.5% of all households were made up of individuals, and 11.3% had someone living alone who was 65 years of age or older. The average household size was 2.26 and the average family size was 2.84.

In the CDP, the population was spread out, with 18.9% under the age of 18, 7.0% from 18 to 24, 30.5% from 25 to 44, 27.1% from 45 to 64, and 16.5% who were 65 years of age or older. The median age was 41 years. For every 100 females, there were 101.7 males. For every 100 females age 18 and over, there were 97.3 males.

The median income for a household in the CDP was $43,984, and the median income for a family was $65,298. Males had a median income of $37,898 versus $33,661 for females. The per capita income for the CDP was $24,144. About 1.3% of families and 4.4% of the population were below the poverty line, including none of those under age 18 and 4.0% of those age 65 or over.

== Religion ==
South Deerfield is home to a single unified Roman Catholic parish. Until 2008, it was served by two parishes, St. Stanislaus Bishop & Martyr, intended to serve the Polish immigrant community, and St. James. In 2009, the Roman Catholic Diocese of Springfield announced that the two parishes would be merged, with the new parish, Holy Family, to occupy the former facilities of St. Stanislaus. The former church building and rectory of St. James were sold to a private purchaser, with a deed provision to ensure that the property not be put to any use inconsistent with the teachings of the Roman Catholic Church. Additionally, in order to address a perceived lack of influence in church governance, in 1929 a breakaway group from St. Stanislaus founded Holy Name of Jesus church, affiliated with the Polish National Catholic Church. A parish of the Ukrainian Greek Catholic Church, Descent of the Holy Spirit (formerly Descent of the Holy Ghost) was founded in 1920 as part of the Ukrainian Catholic Diocese of Stamford, and is active to the present day.

== Points of interest ==
- Borden Base Line
- Magic Wings Butterfly Conservatory
- Mount Sugarloaf State Reservation
- Yankee Candle Flagship Store
