= Western Massachusetts =

Region of Massachusetts, United States

Coordinates: 42°20′N 72°50′W

Map showing the area typically considered to make up western Massachusetts (dark green). Worcester County is usually considered to be in central Massachusetts (light green), although western parts of Worcester County are sometimes considered western Massachusetts.

Western Massachusetts, known colloquially as "Western Mass," is a region in Massachusetts, one of the six U.S. states that make up the New England region of the United States. Western Massachusetts has diverse topography; 22 colleges and universities including UMass in Amherst, MA, with approximately 100,000 students; and such institutions as Tanglewood, the Springfield Armory, and Jacob's Pillow.

The western part of western Massachusetts includes the Berkshire Mountains, where there are several vacation resorts. The eastern part of the region includes the Connecticut River Valley, which has a number of university towns, the major city Springfield, and numerous agricultural hamlets. In the eastern part of the area, the Quabbin region is a place of outdoor recreation.

== History ==
=== Native inhabitants ===
Archeological efforts in the Connecticut River Valley have revealed traces of human life dating back at least 9,000 years. Pocumtuck tradition describes the creation of Lake Hitchcock in Deerfield by a giant beaver, possibly representing the action of a glacier that retracted at least 12,000 years ago. Western Massachusetts was originally settled by Native American societies, including the Pocomtuc, Nonotuck Mohawk, Nipmuck, and Mahican. Various sites indicate millennia of fishing, horticulture, beaver-hunting, and burials. The passage of the Native American Graves Protection and Repatriation Act in 1990 ordered museums across western Massachusetts and the country to repatriate these remains to Native peoples, an ongoing process.

The region was inhabited by several Algonkian-speaking Native American communities, culturally connected but distinguished by the place names they assigned to their respective communities: Agawam (low land), Woronco (in a circular way), Nonotuck (in the midst of the river), Pocumtuck (narrow, swift river), and Sokoki (separated from their neighbors). The modern-day Springfield metropolitan area was inhabited by the Agawam people. The Agawam, as well as other groups, belong to the larger cultural category of Alongkian Indians.

In 1634, a plague, probably smallpox, reduced the Native American population of the Connecticut River Valley to a tiny percentage of its previous size. Governor Bradford of Massachusetts writes that in Windsor, notably the site of a trading post, where European diseases often spread to Native populations, "of 1,000 of [the Native Americans] 150 of them died." With so many dead, English colonists were emboldened to attempt significant settlement of the region.

=== Colonial and early Federal period ===
The first European explorers to reach western Massachusetts were English Puritans, who in 1635, at the request of William Pynchon, settled the land that they considered most advantageous for both agriculture and trading in modern-day Agawam, adjacent to modern Metro Center, Springfield. In 1636, a group of English colonists—lured by the promise of a "great river" and the northeast's most fertile farmland—ventured to Springfield, where they established a permanent colony. Originally, this settlement was called Agawam Plantation, and administered by the Connecticut Colony. (Springfield lies only 4 miles north of Connecticut; however, Agawam included lands as far south as Windsor Locks, as far north as Holyoke, and as far west as Westfield.) In 1640, Springfield voted to separate from the Connecticut Colony following a series of contentious incidents and, after a brief period of independence, decided to align with the coastal Massachusetts Bay Colony, shaping the region's political boundaries. The Massachusetts Bay Colony settled at the Connecticut River Valley's most fertile land―stretching from Windsor, Connecticut, (once part of Springfield,) to Northampton, Massachusetts―from 1636 to 1654.

For the next several decades, Native people experienced a complex relationship with European settlers. The fur trade stood at the heart of their economic interactions, a lucrative business that guided many other policy decisions. White settlers traded wampum, cloth and metal in exchange for furs, as well as horticultural produce. Because of the seasonal nature of goods provided by Native people compared with the constant availability of colonial goods, a credit system developed. Land, the natural resource whose availability did not fluctuate, served as collateral for mortgages in which Native people bought goods from the colonists in exchange for the future promise of beavers. However, trade with the colonists made pelts so lucrative that the beaver was rapidly overhunted. The volume of the trade fell, from a 1654 high of 3723 pelts to a mere 191 ten years later. With every mortgage, Native people lost more land, although their population recovered and expanded from the old plague.

In a process that historian Lisa Brooks calls "the deed game", colonists acquired an increasing amount of land from Indian tribes through debt, fraudulent purchases and a variety of other methods. Native people began to construct and gather in palisaded “forts”―structures that were not necessary beforehand. These sites were excavated in the 19th and 20th centuries by anthropologists who took cultural objects and human remains and displayed them for years in area museums. With the passage of the Native American Graves Protection and Repatriation Act (NAGPRA) in 1990, a long process of repatriation began.

Tensions between the colonists and surrounding Indian tribes, which had already been poor for some time, continued to deteriorate in the years preceding the outbreak of King Philip's War. Colonial encroachment on Indian lands combined with the decimation of the native population with European diseases led to increasing Native resentment and hostility towards the colonists. Though some Indians became integrated into colonial society, with many being employed in white households, numerous pieces of legislation were passed which prevented Indians from marrying settlers and staying in colonial settlements after dark, while colonists were prevented from living among the Indians.

In 1662, the leader of the eastern Massachusetts Wampanoag Indian tribe, Wamsutta, died shortly after being questioned at gunpoint by Plymouth colonists. Wamsutta's brother, Chief Metacomet (known to inhabitants of Springfield as "Philip,") began a war against colonial expansion in New England which spread across the region. As the conflict grew in its initial months, colonists throughout western Massachusetts became deeply concerned with maintaining the loyalty of "their Indians." The Agawams cooperated, even providing valuable intelligence to the colonists.

In August 1675, a group of colonists in Hadley demanded the disarming of a “fort” of Nonotuck Indians. Unwilling to relinquish their weapons, they left on the night of August 25. A hundred colonists pursued them, catching up to them at the foot of Sugarloaf Hill, which was a sacred space for the Nonotucks called the Great Beaver. The colonists attacked, but the Nonotucks forced them to withdraw and were able to keep moving. The shedding of Native blood on sacred land was an attack on their entire kinship network, and caused Native peoples in western Massachusetts to join the ongoing conflict.

Following the war, the greater part of the Native American population left western Massachusetts behind. Many refugees of the war joined the Wabanaki in the north, where their descendants remain today. Native American influence remains evident in the land and culture of western Massachusetts, from the practice of tobacco farming to the names of cities and rivers

In 1777, George Washington and Henry Knox selected Springfield for the site of the fledgling United States' National Armory. Built atop a high bluff overlooking the Connecticut River, Washington and Knox agreed that Springfield provided an ideal location—beside a great river and at the confluence of major rivers and highways. For the following 200 years, the Springfield Armory would bring concentrated prosperity and innovation to Springfield and its surrounding towns.

After the American Revolution, a rebellion led by Daniel Shays culminated in a battle at the National Armory in Springfield.

== Geography ==
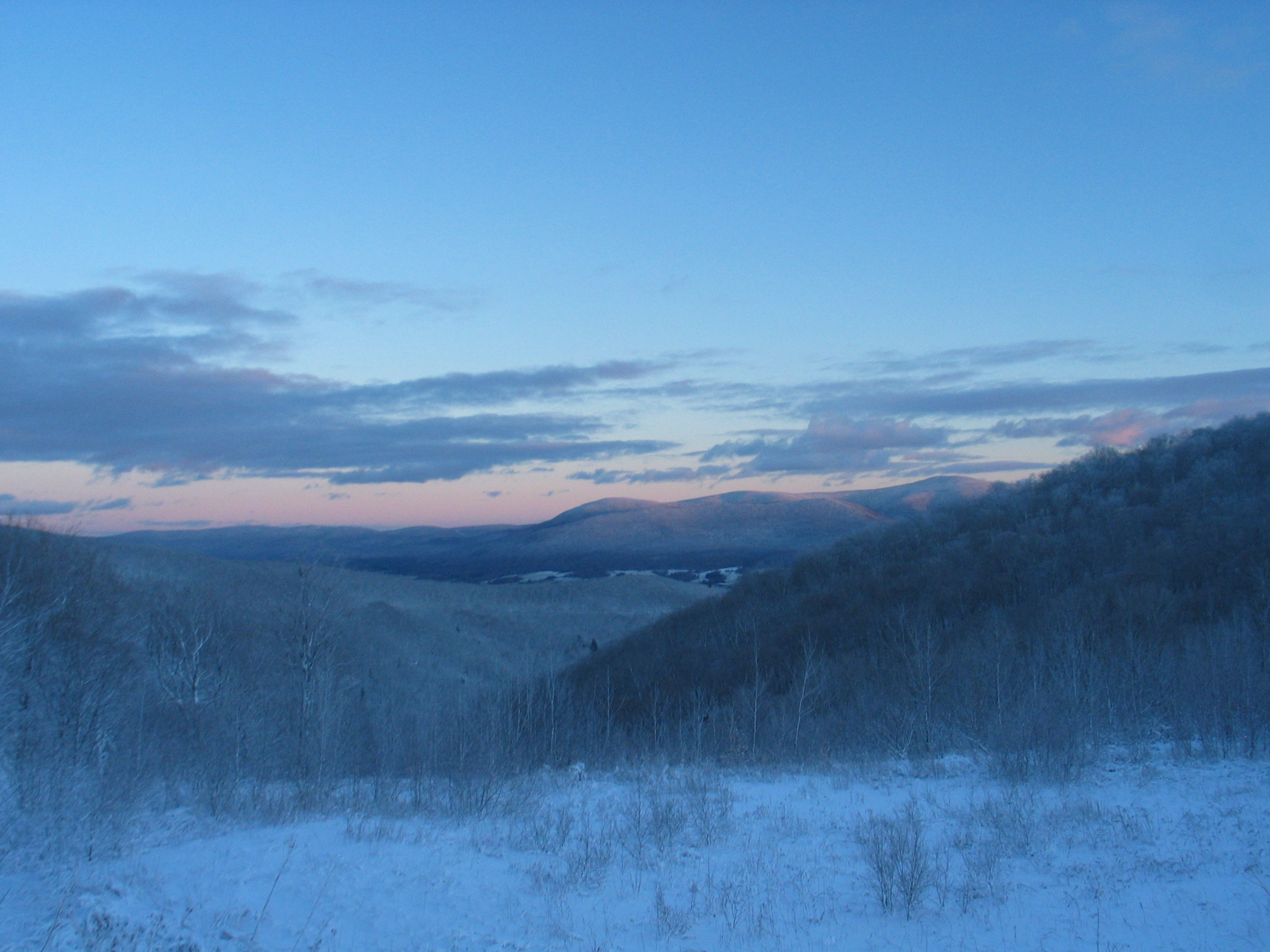
The Berkshire mountains in winter

=== Berkshire Mountains ===
The Berkshires have long been patronized by artists (e.g. Herman Melville, who wrote Moby-Dick while living in Pittsfield; Edith Wharton, who wrote The House of Mirth and Ethan Frome while living in Lenox; and Norman Rockwell, many of whose painting were based on scenes that he observed in the town of Stockbridge). Cultural institutions include Lenox's Tanglewood, Becket's Jacob's Pillow, and Stockbridge's Norman Rockwell Museum, as well the Clark Art Institute in Williamstown. The city of Pittsfield is the largest community located in the Berkshires.

=== Connecticut River Valley ===
New England's largest river, the Connecticut, flows through the center of its agricultural valley. Nearly bisected by the Holyoke Range and the Mount Tom Range, this relatively small area contains a number of college towns, urban environments, and rural hamlets. The portion of this valley in Massachusetts is also commonly referred to as the Pioneer Valley.

At its southern tip, the Springfield-Hartford region is home to 29 colleges and universities and over 160,000 university students—the United States' second highest concentration of higher learning institutions after the Boston metropolitan area.

Innovations originating in the valley include the sports of basketball (James Naismith, 1895) and volleyball (William Morgan, 1895); the first American automobile (Duryea, 1893); the first motorcycle company (Indian, 1901); the first use of interchangeable parts in manufacturing (Thomas Blanchard, 1825); and the first commercial radio station, (WBZ, 1920, from Springfield's Kimball Hotel).

Significant Massachusetts towns and cities in the valley's so-called "Knowledge Corridor" include Northampton, Amherst, Easthampton, Holyoke, Chicopee, West Springfield, East Longmeadow, Longmeadow, Ludlow, Agawam, and Westfield.

=== The Hilltowns ===
The Hilltowns include the areas of Berkshire, Franklin, Hampshire, and Hampden counties west of and above the escarpment bordering the ancient rift valley through which the Connecticut River flows. Elevations increase from about 200 feet (60 m) to at least 1,000 feet (300 m) in the escarpment zone. On top, elevations rise gradually to the west. Williamsburg in Hampshire County and Becket in Berkshire County are prominent hilltowns. Generally, the hilltowns west of the Connecticut River Valley were less attractive for agricultural uses, which resulted in later migration there than, for example, the fertile Connecticut River Valley. Subsistence farming predominated in this area.

The 1,000-foot elevation difference between uplands and the Connecticut River Valley produced streams and rivers with gradients around 40 feet/mile (8 meters/km) flowing through steep-sided valleys, notably the Westfield and Deerfield rivers and their larger tributaries. Mills were built to exploit the kinetic energy of falling water, and mill towns grew up around them, or company towns integrating production, residential and commercial activities.

The development of steam engines to free industrialization from reliance on water power brought about the so-called Second Industrial Revolution when railroads were built along the rivers to take advantage of relatively gentle grades over the Appalachians. And so as hilltop farming towns declined in importance, industrial towns in the river valleys rose to local prominence.

=== The Quabbin and Quaboag regions ===
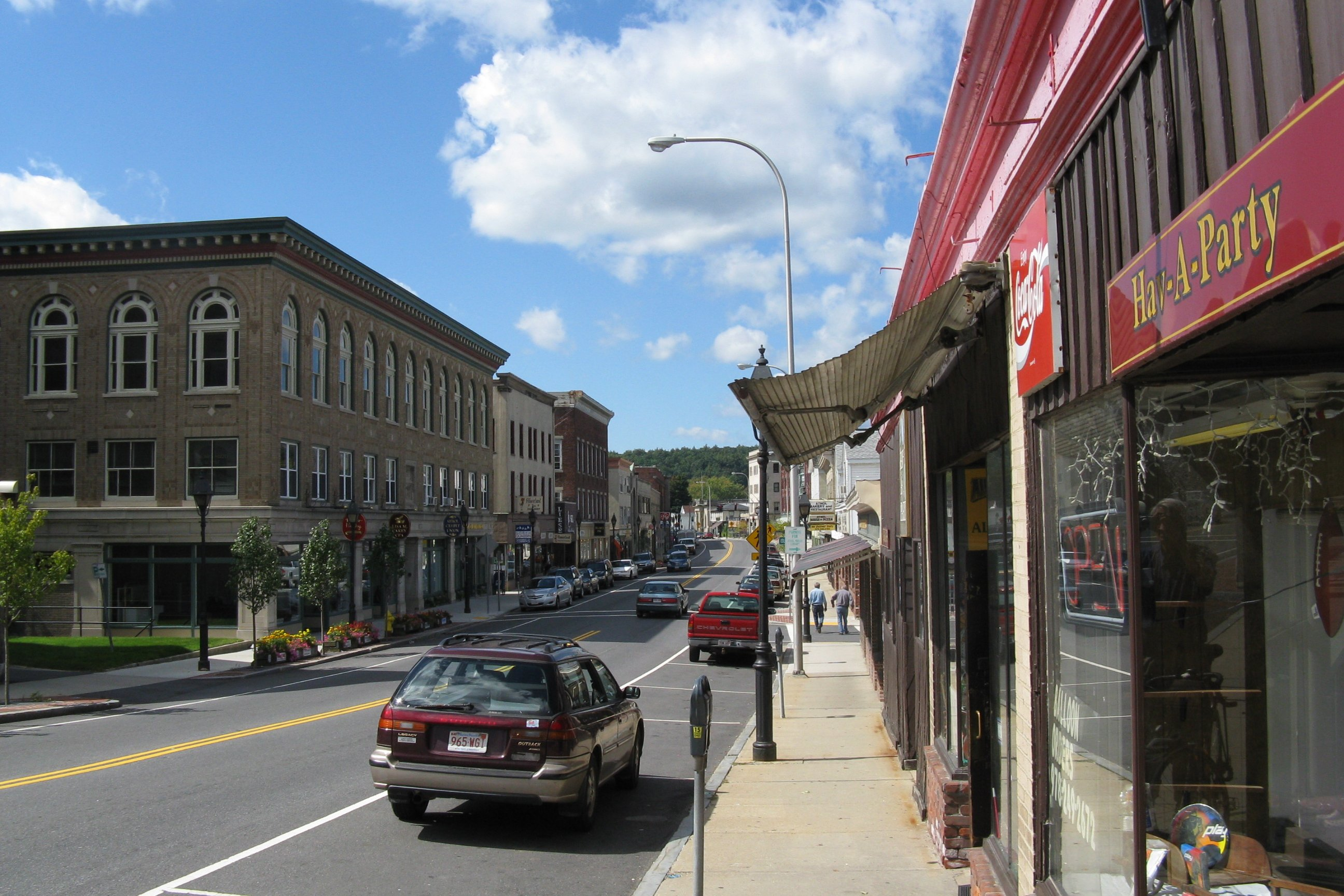
Athol, Massachusetts in 2009

In northern Massachusetts, the higher altitude area to the east of the Connecticut River Valley is known as the North Quabbin region. These northern municipalities include Warwick, Orange, Petersham, Phillipston, Wendell, New Salem, and Athol near the New Hampshire border.

The South Quabbin region (formerly the Swift River Valley) includes the towns of Barre, Belchertown, Pelham, Ware, Hardwick, Leverett, and Shutesbury. This area once included the four "Lost Towns" of Enfield, Dana, Greenwich, and Prescott, which were destroyed to make way for the Quabbin Reservoir.

Farther south, the area called the Quaboag Hills includes Hampden, Monson, Wales, Warren, Holland, Brimfield, Palmer, and Wilbraham on the Connecticut border. Numerous other towns stretching east towards Worcester are sometimes included in the Quaboag Valley region.

Geology is similar to the Hilltown-Berkshire uplands with resistant metamorphic rocks overlain by thin and rocky soil. With less relief, the river valleys are less pronounced, but still moderately high gradient. The Quaboag Hills and Valley, the Quabbin Regions, and populated places stretching east towards Worcester are all locally known as "Hill Towns"; a term interchangeable with the Hill Towns west of the Pioneer Valley.

=== Geology ===
The mountain range in Berkshire County at the western end of Massachusetts is conventionally known as the "Berkshires". Geologically, however, the Berkshires are a westward continuation of uplands west of the Connecticut River and a southern extension of Vermont's Green Mountains.

The Hilltown-Berkshire upland ends at the valley of the Housatonic River which flows south to Long Island Sound, and in the extreme north west of Massachusetts at the Hoosic River, a tributary of the Hudson. From these valleys, uplands to the east appear as a rounded mountain range, rising some 1,600 feet (490 meters) although they are actually a plateau. West of the Housatonic-Hoosic valley system rises the narrower Taconic Range along the New York border. Upper tributaries of the Hoosic separate Massachusetts' highest peak, Mount Greylock 3,491 ft (1,064 meters) from both ranges, however Greylock's geology connects it with the Taconics.

Most of this region is a rolling upland of schist, gneiss and other resistant metamorphics with intrusions of pegmatite and granite. Scraping by continental glaciers during the Pleistocene left thin, rocky soil that supported hardscrabble subsistence farming before the Industrial Revolution. There was hardly a land rush into such marginal land, but the uplands were slowly settled by farmers throughout most of the 18th century and organized into townships. Then in the early 1800s better land opened up in Western New York and the Northwest Territory. The hilltown agricultural population went into a long decline and fields began reverting to forest.

The Connecticut River Valley is an ancient downfaulted graben or rift valley that formed during the Mesozoic Era when rifting developed in the Pangaea supercontinent to separate North America from Europe and South America from Africa. Secondary rifts branched off the main crustal fracture, and this one was eventually occupied by the Connecticut River. The Metacomet Ridge is a series of narrow traprock ridges where lava penetrated this rift zone, beginning at the northern end of the graben near Greenfield and extending south across Massachusetts and Connecticut to Long Island Sound. Fossil dinosaur footprints in Holyoke attest to the life present in this region during the Mesozoic.

As continental glaciers receded near the end of the last glacial period, a moraine at Rocky Hill, Connecticut, dammed the river to create Lake Hitchcock, extending northward some 200 miles (320 km) inundating places such as Springfield, Agawam, and West Springfield, while certain highlands remained above water, (i.e. sections of Holyoke).

Accumulation of fine sediments during the era of Lake Hitchcock accounts for this region's exceptionally rich agricultural soil, which attracted settlers as early as 1635. Although the Connecticut River Valley's soil is the richest in New England, many of its fields have been covered by urban and suburban development. Regardless, the valley remains New England's most productive farmland. Tobacco, tomatoes, sweet corn, and other vegetables are still produced there in commercial quantities.

== Demographics ==
Berkshire, Franklin, Hampshire and Hampden counties, in the year 2020 collectively had 828,188 residents, a population greater than that of any one of the six smallest U.S. states. The population amounted to approximately 12.84% of the 2000 population of the entire state of Massachusetts, which was 6,349,097. Its average population density is 293.07 inhabitants per square mile (113.16/km^{2}), compared to 422.34/km^{2} (1,093.87/sq mi) for the rest of Massachusetts, and 312.68/km^{2} (809.83/sq mi) for the state as a whole.

Western Massachusetts' population is concentrated in the cities and suburbs along the Connecticut River in an urban axis surrounding Springfield that is contiguous with greater Hartford, Connecticut (i.e. the Knowledge Corridor.) A secondary population concentration exists in the Housatonic-Hoosic valley due to the industrial heritage of Pittsfield and North Adams, and the development of tourism throughout that valley. This far-western zone is linked to New York City and Albany, New York, more than with the rest of Massachusetts, however both populated zones are ultimately part of the Northeast megalopolis. The rest of western Massachusetts is lightly populated, particularly the Hilltowns where densities below 50 persons per square mile (20 per km^{2}) are the rule.

In descending order of size, its largest communities are: Springfield, Chicopee, Pittsfield, Westfield, Holyoke, Northampton, Agawam, West Springfield, Amherst Center (CDP), Easthampton, Longmeadow (CDP), East Longmeadow, North Adams, and Greenfield (CDP).

== Economy ==
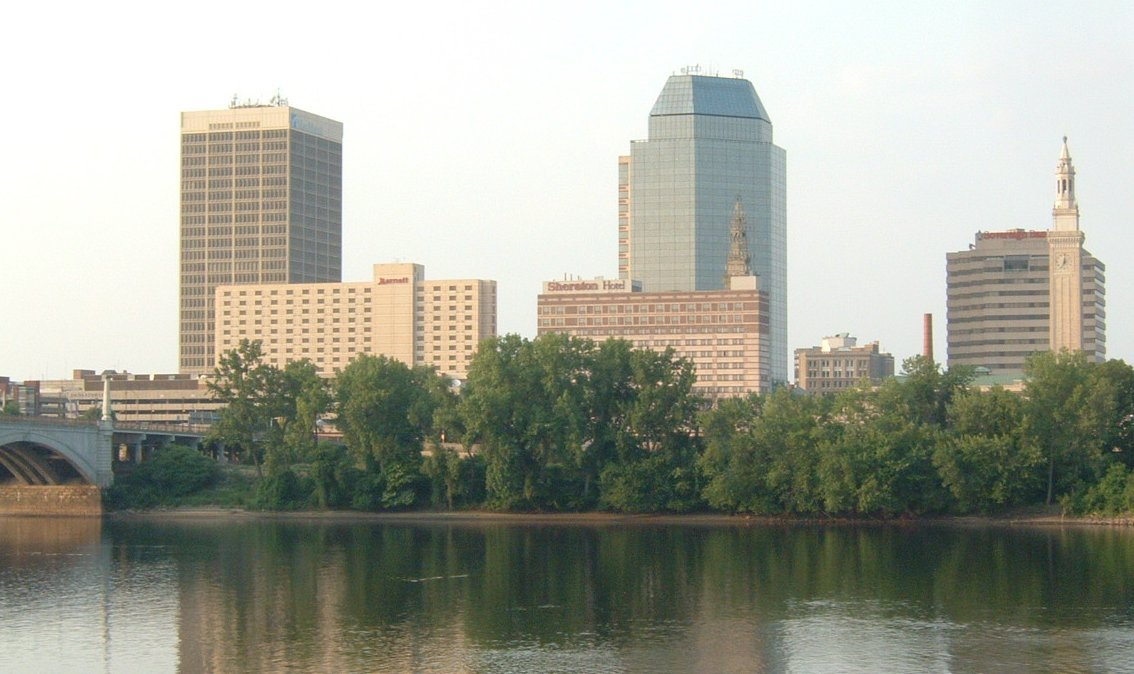
Skyline of Springfield, Massachusetts

Western Massachusetts has been compared as a microcosm of the rest of the United States. The third largest city in Massachusetts, Springfield is situated in the region, and it has struggled financially coming close to bankruptcy at the beginning of the 21st century. The unemployment rate in the area lags behind that of eastern Massachusetts by double though officials have pushed for ways to lure more longer-term business growth into the region to tap the abundance of students being turned out by colleges and universities in the area. To combat the higher cost of telecommunications which were roughly double that of eastern Massachusetts, the government of the Commonwealth invested $45.4 Million in building out a broadband network using Federal grant under the 'Massachusetts Technology Park - MassBroadband 123' initiative, funds which were matched by $45 million in federal investment. The 1,200 mile 'middle mile' project was completed in early 2014, connecting public institutions throughout central and western Massachusetts, but also providing a fiber-optic backbone to allow for further expansion in these regions. Building off of that project, the Commonwealth launched a 'Last Mile' initiative targeting 54 communities that were unserved or under-served by broadband. That program has invested in municipal fiber-to-the-home networks, which are also supported by municipal bonds; private provider projects; and advanced wireless projects to connect homes and businesses in these communities. Small, rural towns such as Mount Washington, Mass., now have access to internet speeds that reach 500 megabit per second (Mbps) symmetrical service. In recent years there has been a push for adding high-speed rail from western Massachusetts for eastern Massachusetts. The residents of western Massachusetts have vibrant culture in and support the local mix of arts, tourism, and culture.

== Education ==
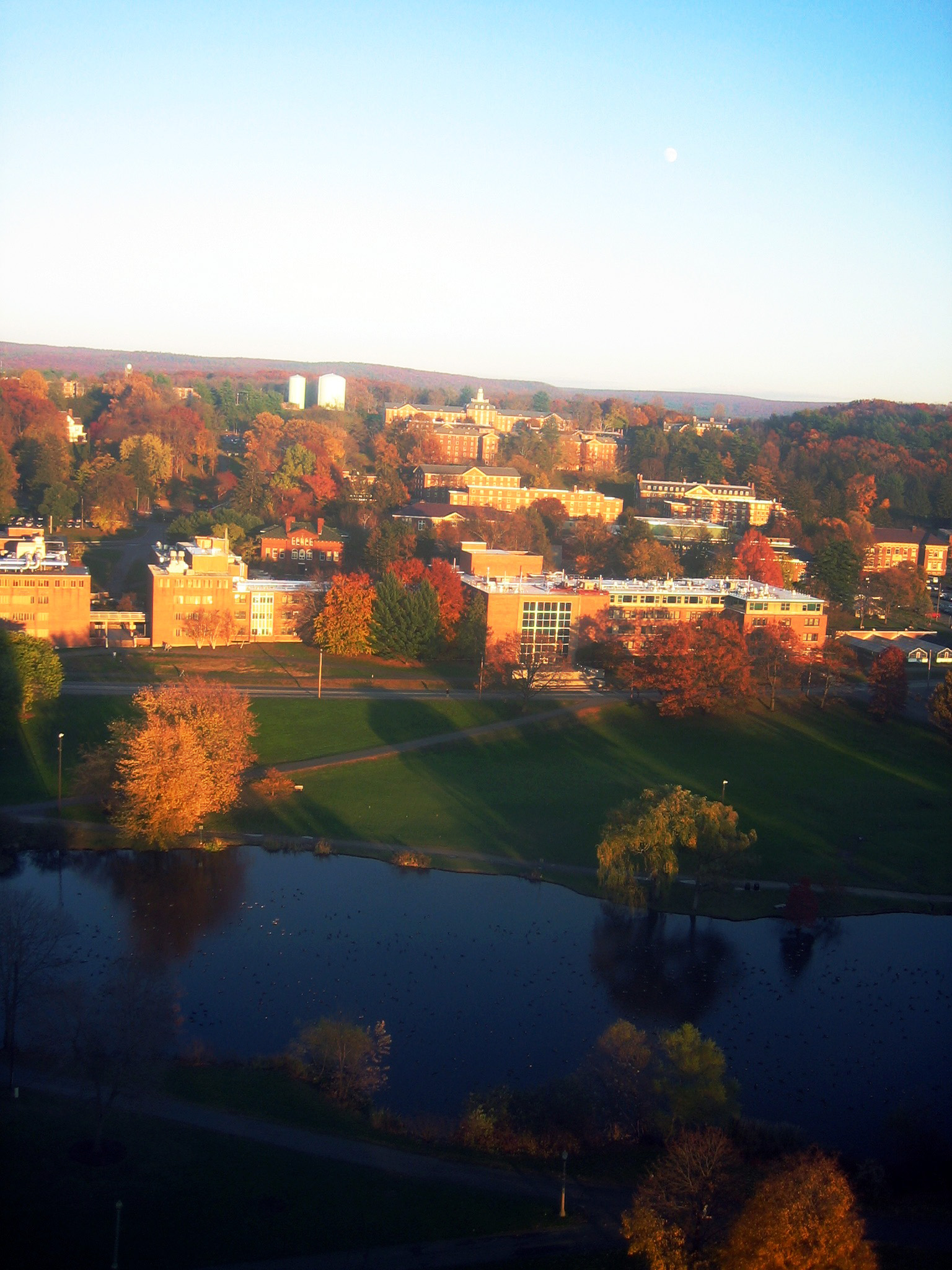
UMass Amherst in 2006

The decline of manufacturing as the region's economic engine since World War II—and in particular, since the controversial closing of the Springfield Armory—was counterbalanced in western Massachusetts by growth in post-secondary education and healthcare.

This created new jobs, land development, and had gentrifying effects in many college towns. State and community-funded schools (e.g., University of Massachusetts Amherst and Westfield State University) were conspicuous in their growth, as were the region's highly regarded liberal arts colleges, including Williams founded 1793, Amherst founded 1821, Mount Holyoke founded 1837, Smith founded 1871, and American International founded 1885.

Despite the gains in higher ed, the region has sought to obtain equitable share of the state's education budget to place into local primary education as well. Several communities in western Massachusetts have fought to have changes made the Chapter 70 structure which the state presently uses to allocate education funding to cities and towns.

=== Colleges and universities ===
- Amherst College
- American International College
- Bay Path University
- Berkshire Community College
- Conway School of Landscape Design
- Elms College
- Five Colleges Association
- Greenfield Community College
- Hampshire College
- Holyoke Community College
- Massachusetts College of Liberal Arts
- Mount Holyoke College
- Smith College
- Springfield College
- Springfield Technical Community College
- University of Massachusetts Amherst
- Westfield State University
- Western New England University
- Williams College

== Government and politics ==
Western Massachusetts used to be the Republican stronghold in an otherwise heavily Democratic state, but it is now consistently viewed by political analysts as one of the most politically liberal regions in the United States. In 2006 and 2010, the region voted heavily in favor of Democratic gubernatorial candidate Deval Patrick.

In Crash!ng the Party, Ralph Nader includes western Massachusetts as one of the few places in the country where he believes small-town spirit is still strong. In a 2010 editorial, the Boston Globe berated communities in northern western-Massachusetts for resisting efforts to force consolidation of local school districts. In response, the Franklin County School Committee Caucus released a map that overlaid the county north-to-south over Metro Boston. The overlay reached from Rhode Island in the south to New Hampshire in the north and Framingham in the west.

In 2008 the Office of the Governor of the Commonwealth of Massachusetts opened a local office in western Massachusetts.

=== Counties ===
The western portion of Massachusetts consists approximately of the four counties of Franklin, Hampshire, Hampden and Berkshire. This set of four counties is sometimes regarded as defining western Massachusetts; for example, the Western Massachusetts Office of the Governor serves residents of these counties. Towns at the western edge of Worcester County, especially those near the Quabbin Reservoir, may be considered to be in western Massachusetts for some purposes; for example, two Worcester County towns have telephone numbers in western Massachusetts's area code 413.

Hampden County, with over half of the population of western Massachusetts, includes the City of Springfield; to the north, Hampshire County contains the college towns of Northampton, Amherst and South Hadley; further north, rural Franklin County borders Vermont and New Hampshire; to the west is Berkshire County, bordering New York, Vermont and Connecticut and the other three counties.

After a number of county governments were eliminated in Massachusetts in the late 1990s (including Franklin, Hampshire, Hampden, Berkshire and Worcester), most county functions were assigned to the state government. The municipalities of Franklin and Hampshire counties then organized two voluntary county-oriented "regional councils of government".

=== Attitude towards eastern Massachusetts/Boston ===
Some residents of western Massachusetts are critical towards Boston, the state's capital and largest city. This group believes that the Massachusetts legislative and executive branches know little of and care little about western Massachusetts, which comprises 20% of the total population of the state. Among the incidents that have created this feeling:

- The dismantling, submerging and disincorporation of four western Massachusetts towns, Prescott, Enfield, Greenwich (formerly in Hampshire County) and Dana (formerly in Worcester County), to build the Quabbin Reservoir that supplies water to Boston. Also disruption of small towns accompanying flood control projects such as Knightville Reservoir and construction of the Massachusetts Turnpike.
- Extreme inequities in additional state assistances per capita for western Massachusetts cities compared with eastern Massachusetts cities—for example, in 2006, for every $278.66 Boston received, its neighbor Cambridge received $176.37, Greater Boston's westernmost city, Worcester, received $67.50, while the City of Springfield received $12.04 per person.
- Former state House Speaker Tom Finneran's use of parliamentary rules to deny Northampton an election to fill a vacant House seat.
- Abolishing county governance placed formerly local property and employees under the direct administration of the eastern capital. This also affected representation of low-population/large-land rural towns which previously relied on their county seat in budgeting of road maintenance funding.

Long a haven for small, independent businesses, western Massachusetts has expressed conflicted feelings towards big box corporations, leading to controversies about zoning changes and variances that would allow companies such as Wal-Mart to build in western Massachusetts towns. The debate has been particularly strong in northern towns; for example, in Greenfield, Massachusetts.

== Transportation ==
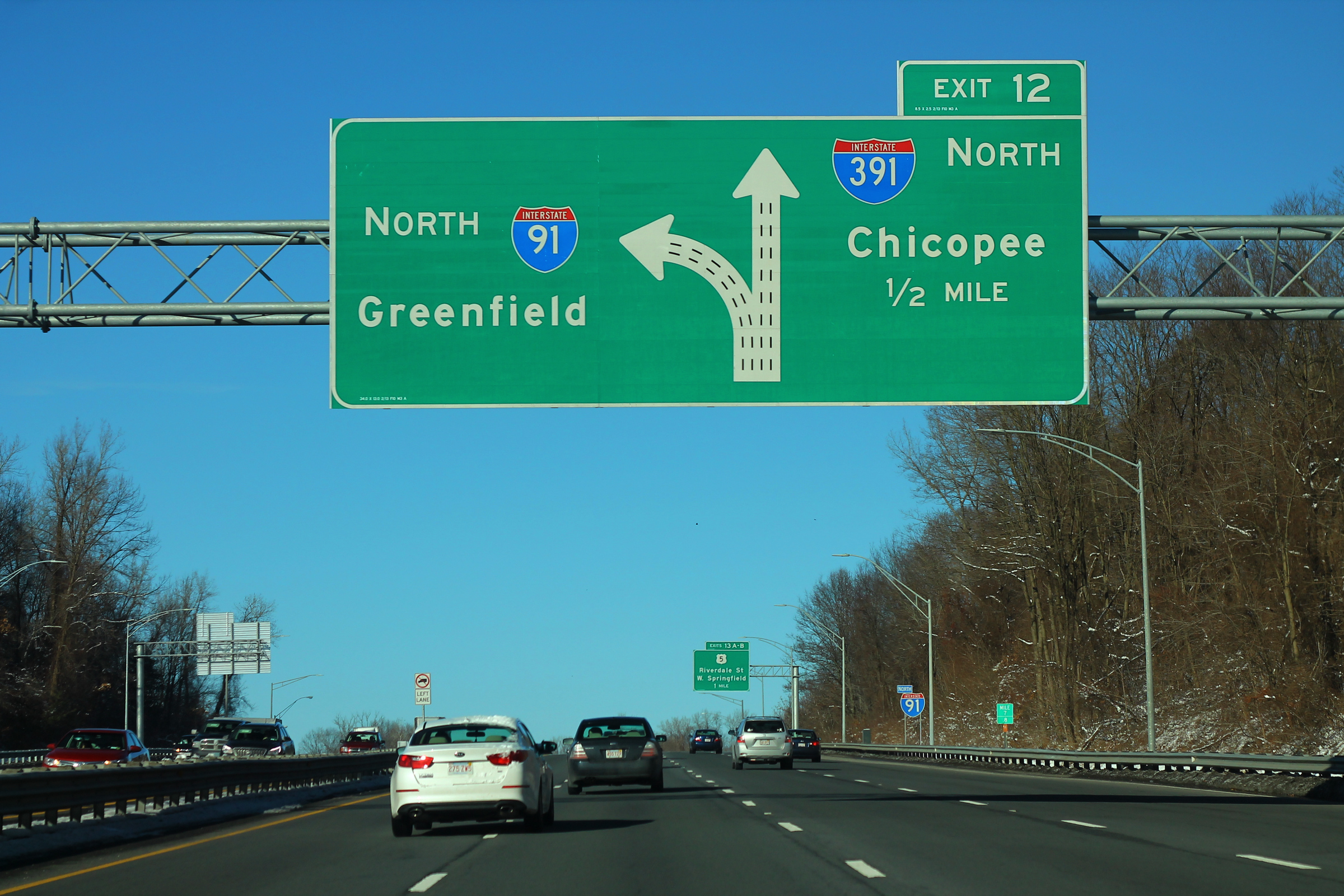
Interstate 91 North

=== Interstates ===
- I-84
- I-90
- I-91
- I-291
- I-391

=== U.S. Routes ===
- US 5
- US 7
- US 20
- US 202

=== State highways ===
- Route 2
- Route 2A
- Route 5A
- Route 7A
- Route 8
- Route 8A
- Route 9
- Route 10
- Route 19
- Route 20A
- Route 21
- Route 23
- Route 30
- Route 32
- Route 33
- Route 38
- Route 41
- Route 43
- Route 47
- Route 57
- Route 62
- Route 63
- Route 66
- Route 67
- Route 71
- Route 75
- Route 78
- Route 83
- Route 97
- Route 102
- Route 106
- Route 112
- Route 116
- Route 122
- Route 141
- Route 142
- Route 143
- Route 147
- Route 159
- Route 168
- Route 181
- Route 183
- Route 186
- Route 187
- Route 189
- Route 192
- Route 225
- Route 295

=== Bridges and tunnels ===
- Hoosac Tunnel

=== Airports ===
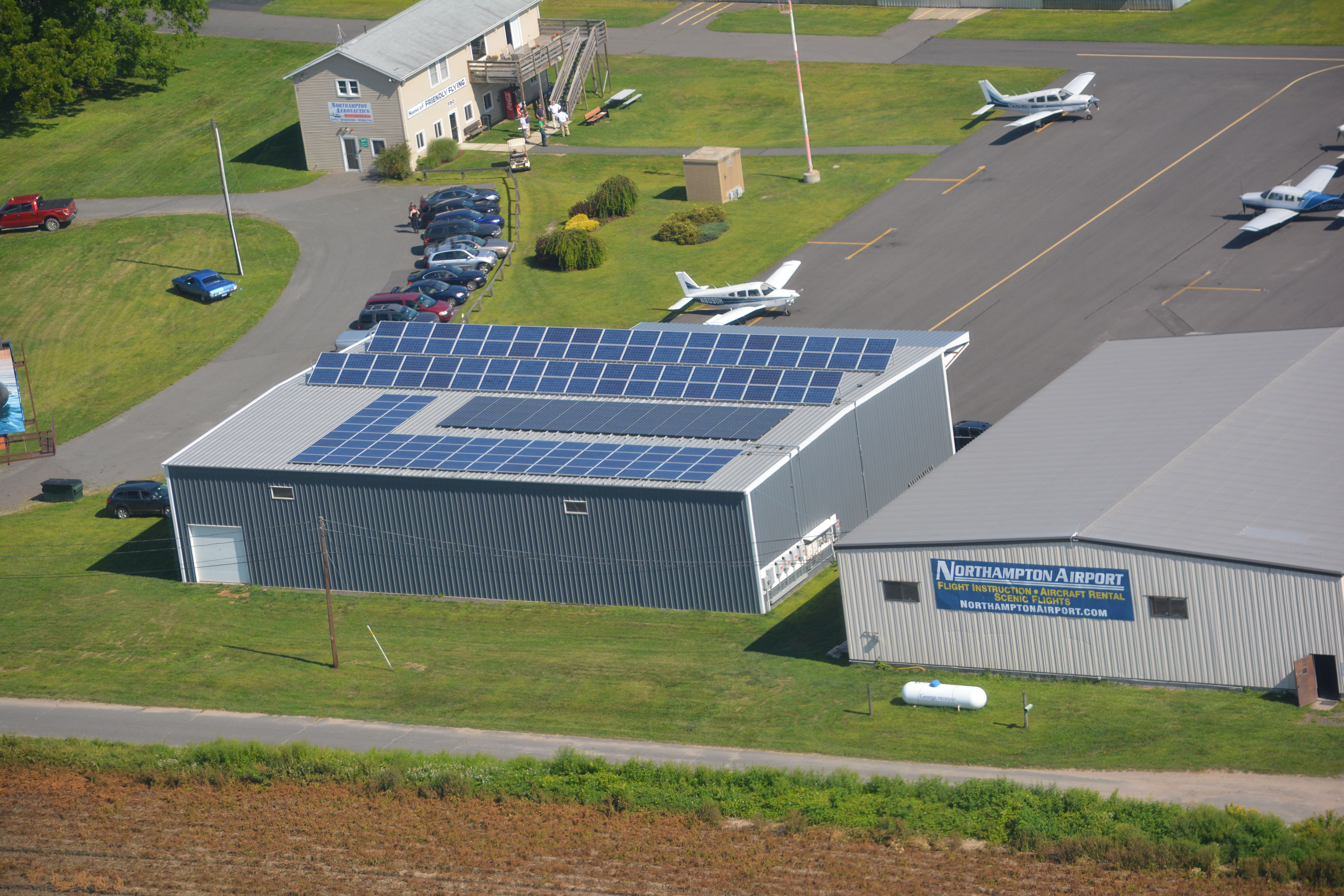
Northampton Airport in 2013

- Great Barrington Airport
- North Adams Airport
- Northampton Airport
- Orange Municipal Airport
- Pittsfield Municipal Airport
- Turners Falls Airport
- Westfield-Barnes Regional Airport
- Westover Airport

==== Nearby airports ====
- Logan International Airport in Boston, 3 miles (4.8 km) northeast of downtown Boston, New England's largest transportation center
- Worcester Regional Airport in Worcester, Massachusetts
- Manchester-Boston Regional Airport in Manchester, New Hampshire
- Albany International Airport, West of the Berkshires in upstate New York
- Bradley International Airport, South of Springfield in Connecticut

=== Rail and bus ===
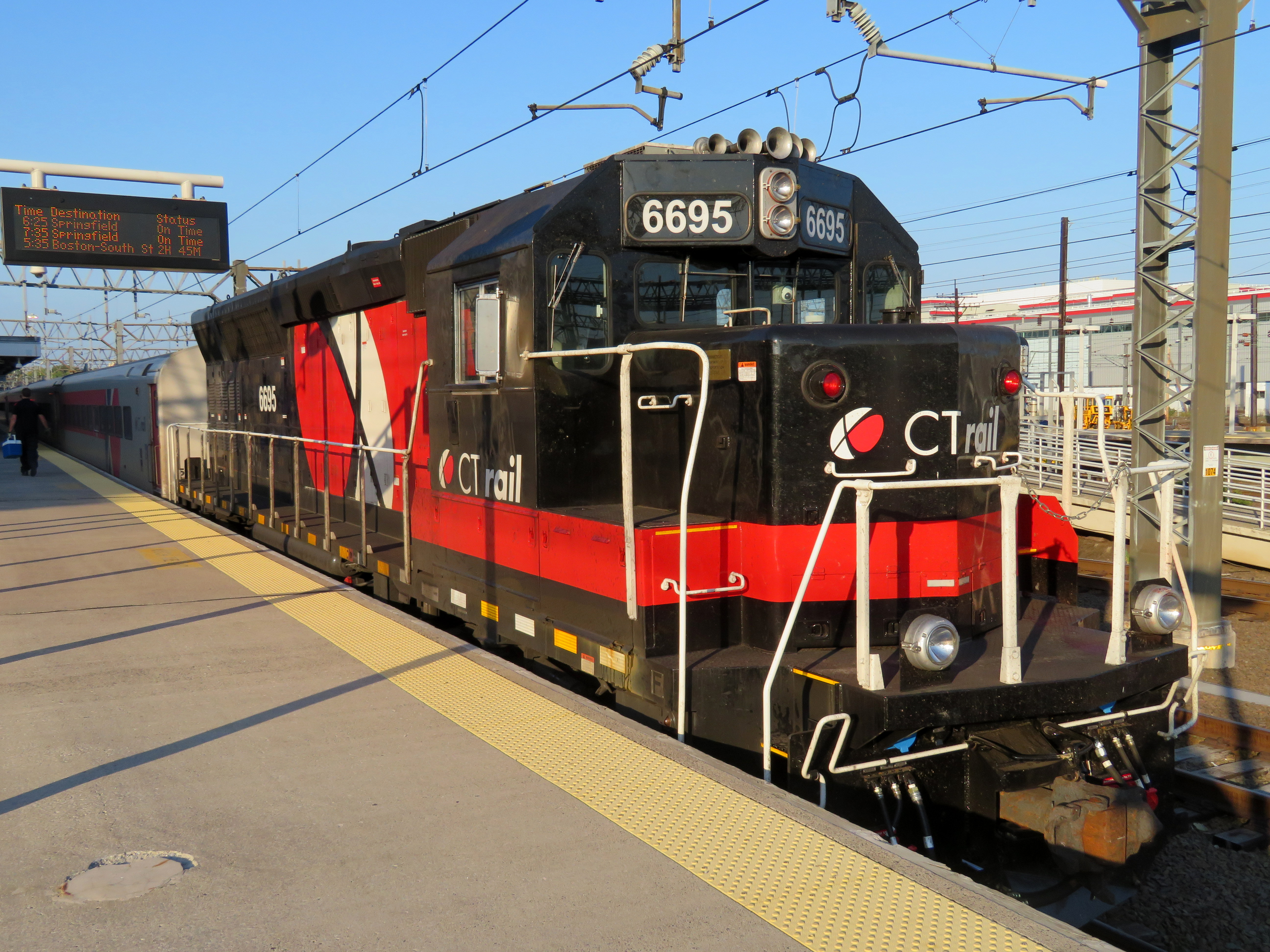
The Hartford Line provides regular commuter rail service between Springfield, Hartford, and New Haven, with tentative plans to increase service frequency and provide additional stops

- Amtrak operates three lines through western Massachusetts. All three stop at Springfield Union Station.
  - Lake Shore Limited Line: Travels from Chicago, Illinois to Boston: Travels from the capitol in Boston, stops at Springfield-Union, Joseph Scelsi Intermodal Transportation Center (Pittsfield, MA), and service onward to upstate New York towards Buffalo via Albany.
  - Northeast Regional Travels from Springfield to D.C./Virginia, converges at New Haven, CT into the mainline with the separate-branch from Boston.
  - Vermonter Line: Travels from Washington, D.C. to Vermont with four stops in western Massachusetts including: Union-Springfield, Holyoke station, Union-Northampton, John W. Olver Transit Center (Greenfield, MA).
- CTRail's Hartford Line started operating to Union Station-Springfield as the northern terminus. Trains operate from New Haven, CT with multiple stops in Connecticut along the way. The New Haven–Springfield Line was upgraded in conjunction with the launch of the Hartford Line service. The project received funding from the Commonwealth of Massachusetts, the Federal Government, and the State of Connecticut. Amtrak trains on the route between New Haven and Springfield reach speeds of 110 mph (177 km/h).
  - Central Corridor Rail Line: A proposed line is under review from New London, CT. This line would also have stations in western Massachusetts at: Union-Palmer (Palmer, MA); Amherst station; and Millers Falls before reaching Vermont.

The following regional transit authorities operate in western Massachusetts:

- Berkshire Regional Transit Authority
- Franklin Regional Transit Authority
- Pioneer Valley Transit Authority (connects with Connecticut Transit Hartford rail)

== Leisure activities and places of historical interest ==
- Susan B. Anthony Birthplace Museum
- Arrowhead (Herman Melville)
- Basketball Hall of Fame
- The Big E
- Clark Art Institute
- The Five Colleges: Amherst College, Hampshire College, Mount Holyoke College, Smith College, and UMass Amherst
- Forest Park in Springfield – one of the largest urban parks in the U.S., featuring a zoo and Bright Nights during the holidays
- Eric Carle Museum of Picture Book Art
- Historic Deerfield
- Emily Dickinson Museum: The Homestead and The Evergreens
- Jacob's Pillow
- MassMoCA
- National Yiddish Book Center
- The Quadrangle
  - Dr. Seuss Memorial
- The Mount
- Norman Rockwell Museum
- Tanglewood
- Six Flags New England
- J. A. Skinner State Park
- The Springfield Armory National Park
- Springfield, Massachusetts' Club Quarter
- Yankee Candle
- Shelburne Falls Bridge of Flowers
- Shelburne Falls Trolley Museum
- Wistariahurst

=== Outdoor recreation ===
- Appalachian Trail
- Ashuwillticook Rail Trail
- Bash Bish Falls State Park
- Berkshire East Ski Area
- The Berkshires
- Blandford Ski Area
- Bousquet Ski Area
- Connecticut River
- Deerfield River
- Farmington River
- Jiminy Peak
- Lake Buel
- Lake Onota
- Mount Everett State Reservation
- Mount Greylock
- Mount Holyoke
- Mount Tom
- Otis Reservoir
- Pittsfield State Forest
- Quabbin Reservoir
- Ski Butternut—Great Barrington
- Westfield River

== See also ==
- Area code 413
- Cooperating Colleges of Greater Springfield
- Five College Consortium
- Geography of Massachusetts
- List of counties in Massachusetts
- Seven Sisters (colleges)

== General and cited references ==
- "Hilltown Families".
- "What to Do in Pioneer Valley". Archived from the original on 2 April 2019.
- "(Map of) Massachusetts Cities and Towns" (PDF). Citizen Information Service, Secretary of the Commonwealth. 27 February 2019.
- "Homepage". Exploring Western Massachusetts. Local history blog.
