= Massachusetts Route 33 =

North-south state highway in Massachusetts, US

Route 33
- Route 33 highlighted in red

Route information
- Maintained by MassDOT
- Length: 5.54 mi (8.92 km)
- Existed: c. 1946–present

Major junctions
- South end: Route 141 in Chicopee
- I-90 / Mass Pike in Chicopee; US 202 in South Hadley
- North end: Route 116 in South Hadley

Location
- Country: United States
- State: Massachusetts
- Counties: Hampden, Hampshire

Highway system
- Massachusetts State Highway System; Interstate; US; State
← Route 32A	→ Route 35

Route 33 is a 5.54-mile-long (8.92 km) state highway contained entirely within the city of Chicopee and the town of South Hadley in Massachusetts. Its southern terminus is at Route 141 and its northern terminus is at Route 116.

== Route description ==
Route 33 begins at Route 141 just north of the Chicopee River in the Chicopee Falls section of the city. It crosses under the Massachusetts Turnpike, with the entrance ramps for Exit 5 just north of this. It passes west of Westover Joint Air Reserve Base before entering the town of South Hadley. Once in South Hadley, the road crosses U.S. Route 202, which leads westward towards Holyoke, as it turns northeast, ending at Route 116, the street itself continuing as Lyman Street.

== Major intersections ==
County	Location	mi	km	Destinations	Notes
Hampden	Chicopee	0.0	0.0	Route 141 – Chicopee Center, Indian Orchard, Ludlow, Holyoke	Southern terminus
Hampden	Chicopee	0.9	1.4	I-90 / Mass Pike – Boston, Albany, NY	Exit 49 on I-90 / Mass Pike
Hampshire	South Hadley	4.6	7.4	US 202 – Granby, Belchertown, Holyoke	
Hampshire	South Hadley	5.54	8.92	Route 116 to Route 47 – Amherst, Greenfield, Holyoke	Northern terminus
1.000 mi = 1.609 km; 1.000 km = 0.621 mi
