= Massachusetts Route 116 =

Highway in Massachusetts

Route 116
- Route 116 highlighted in red

Route information
- Maintained by MassDOT
- Length: 68.26 mi (109.85 km)

Major junctions
- South end: Route 20A in Springfield
- I-391 in Chicopee; US 202 in South Hadley; Route 9 from Amherst to Hadley; US 5 / Route 10 from Whately to Deerfield; I-91 in Deerfield
- North end: Route 8 in Adams

Location
- Country: United States
- State: Massachusetts
- Counties: Hampden, Hampshire, Franklin, Berkshire

Highway system
- Massachusetts State Highway System; Interstate; US; State
← Route 115	→ Route 117

Route 116 is a 68.26-mile-long (109.85 km) north–south (though in its northern part it is more east–west) state highway in Massachusetts. The route runs from Route 20A in Springfield through mill towns, college towns and rural towns, crossing the Connecticut River three times before finally ending at Route 8 in Adams.

== Route description ==
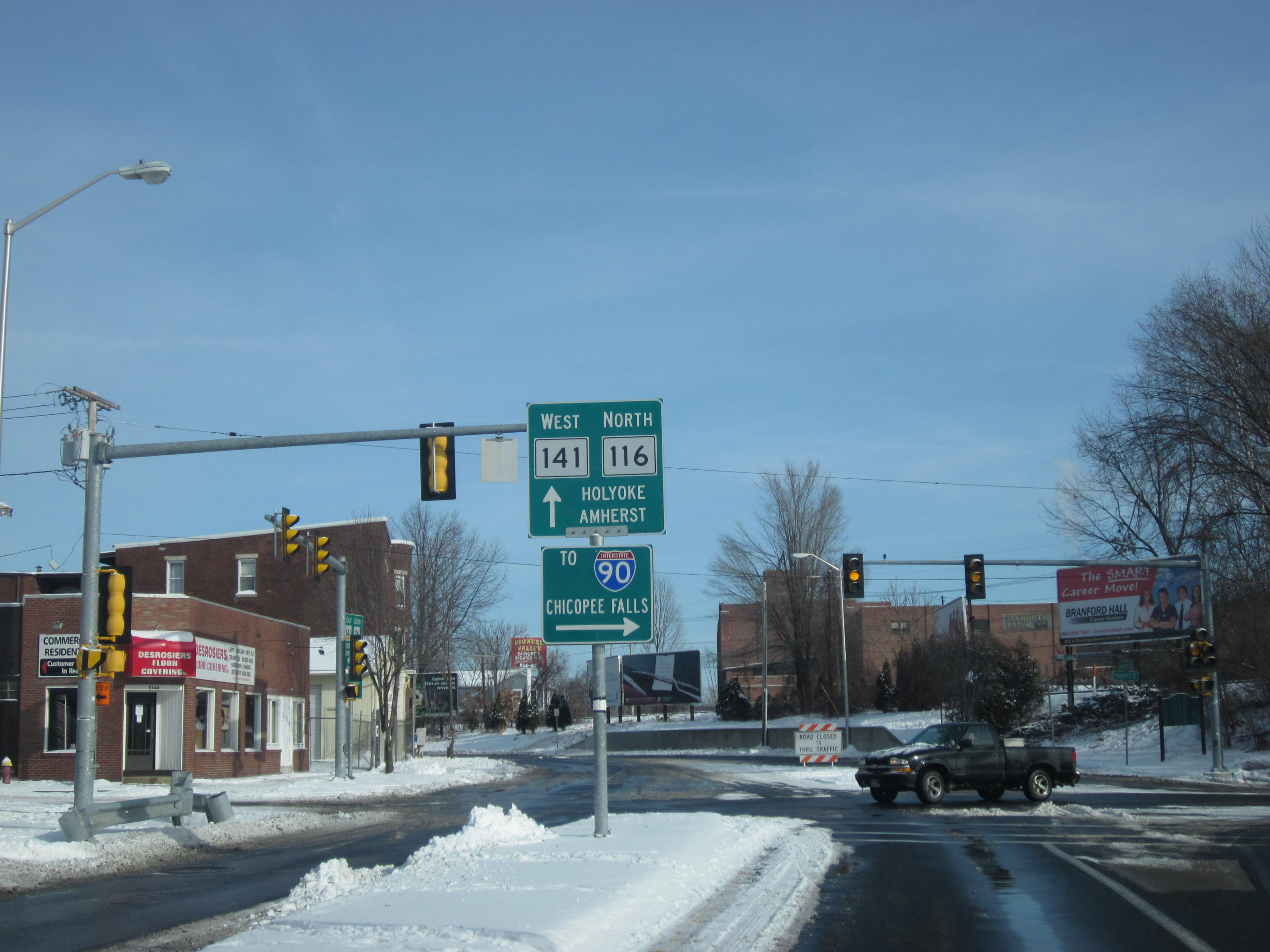
Route 141 and Route 116 through Chicopee

Route 116 begins at Route 20A in Springfield, just before that route ends at its parent route and I-91. The route junctions with the interstate officially, before entering the city of Chicopee. The route crosses I-91 without junction before meeting I-391 twice, on either side of the Chicopee River. It then crosses under the Massachusetts Turnpike (I-90) before curling through Chicomansett Village. In the northwest corner of Chicopee Route 141 becomes concurrent with the route, just east of I-391, which it crosses without junction. It then crosses the Willimansett Bridge into Holyoke, passing through the downtown area on two one-way streets, with Route 141 leaving the route during that time. It then becomes one route again, crossing a canal before crossing the Vietnam Memorial Bridge into South Hadley and Hampshire County.

In South Hadley, Route 116 meets U.S. Route 202 with a cloverleaf interchange. After meeting the northern end of Route 33 it continues northward, passing Mount Holyoke College, where Route 47 begins. It then turns northeastward, passing through the northwest corner of Granby before clipping South Hadley again on the way into Amherst. The route passes Hampshire College and Amherst College before meeting Route 9 at the center of town. Route 116 then becomes concurrent with Route 9, heading southwestward before entering Hadley. Route 116 leaves the route 9 concurrency and turns northward as a four lane divided freeway. It passes the western edge of UMass Amherst, passing behind Warren McGuirk Alumni Stadium and having an interchange with North Hadley Road, which connects the route directly to the university. The route narrows to a two lane undivided road and meets the southern end of Route 63 before meeting Sunderland Road before passing into Franklin County and the town of Sunderland.

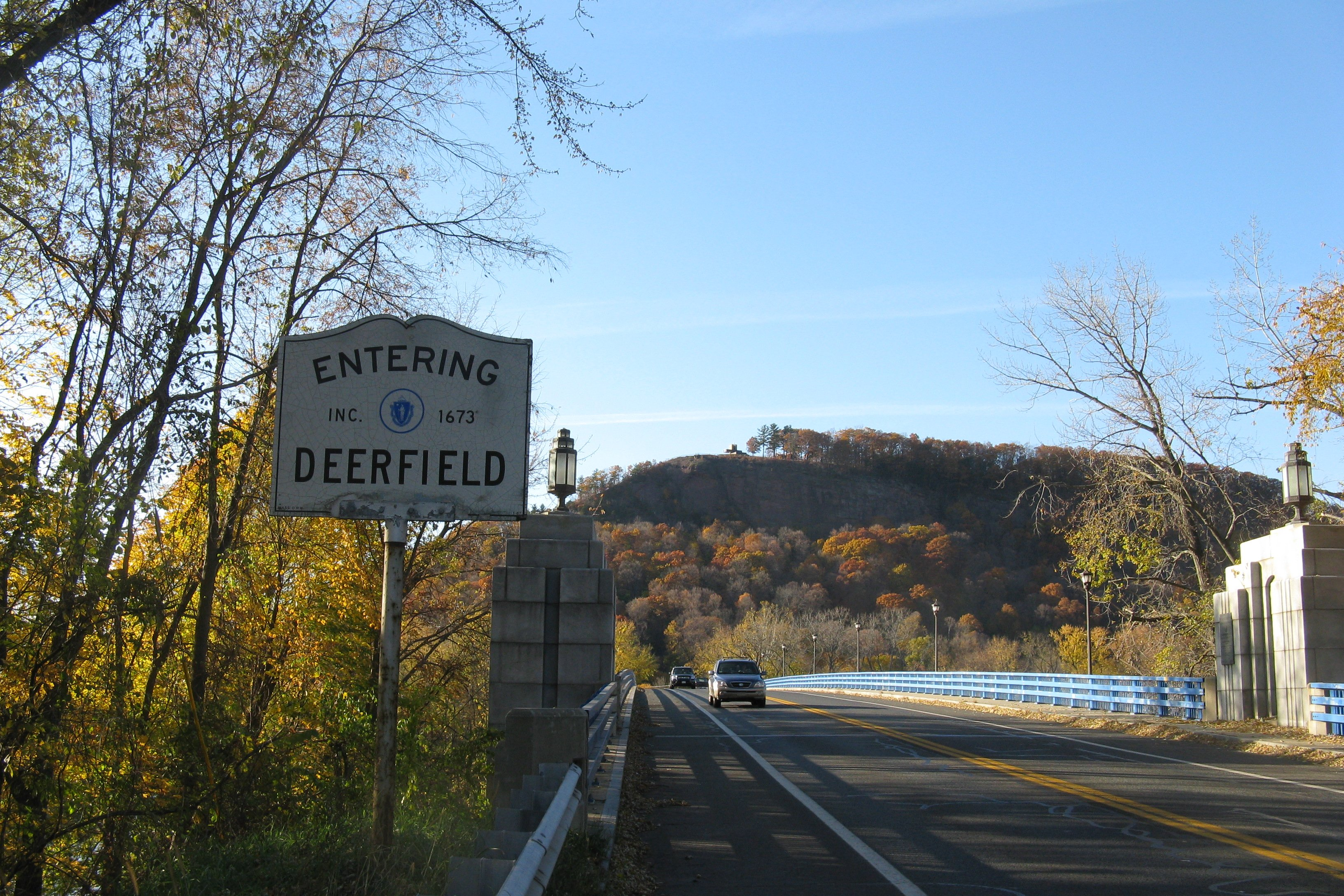
Entering Deerfield crossing the Sunderland Bridge westbound with Sugarloaf Mountain in the background

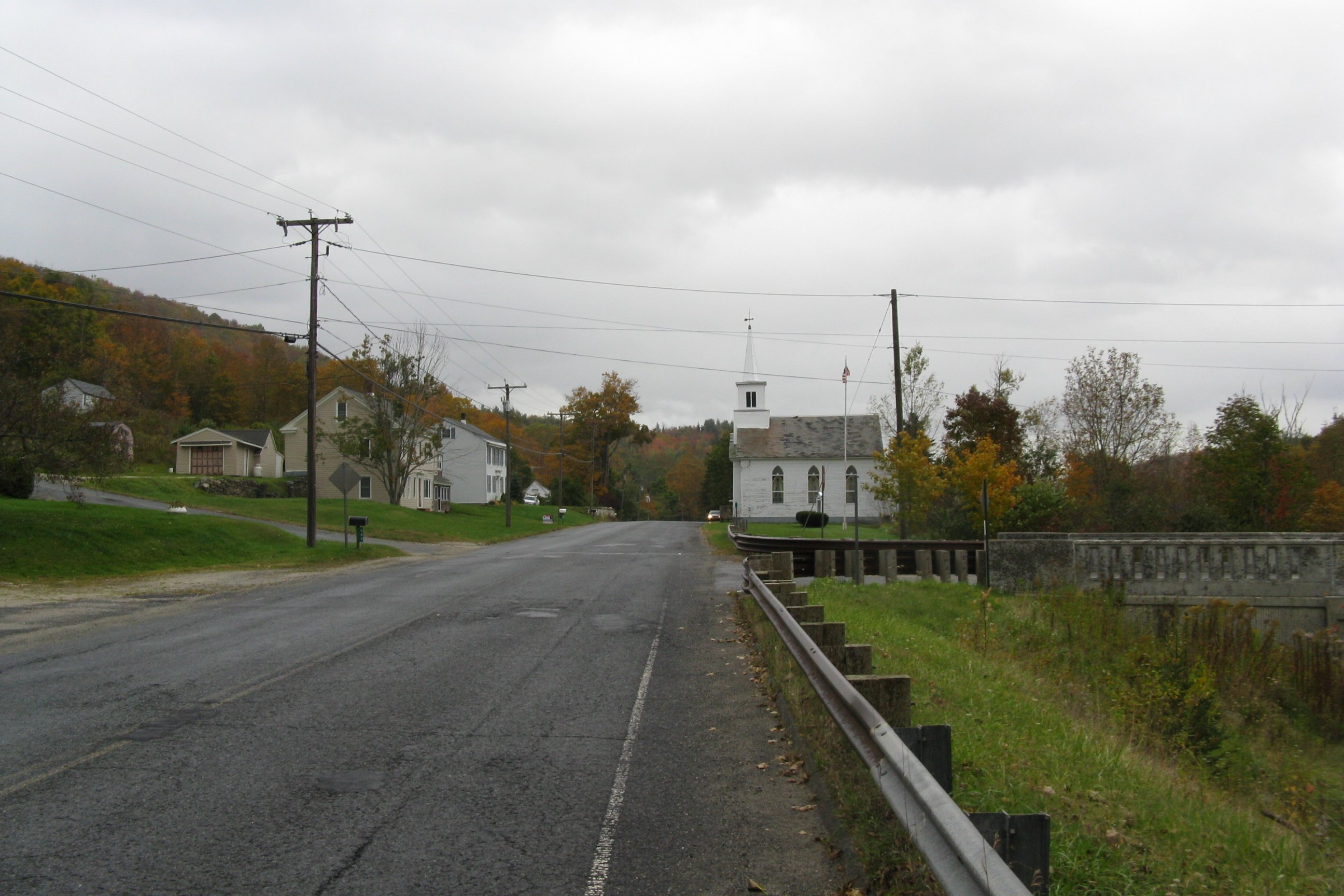
Eastbound in Savoy

In Sunderland, Route 116 passes west of the Green Swamp and Bull Hill before crossing Route 47 again in the town center before crossing the Connecticut River a third time, over the Sunderland Bridge into Deerfield. The route then meets U.S. Route 5 and Route 10 just over the Whately town line, and just north of I-91. It then follows Routes 5 & 10 for about a mile before leaving the route, heading westward and crossing I-91. The route heads northwestward, passing through the Mill River area of town and passing into Conway.

Once the route enters Conway, it becomes a winding route, passing through that town center before continuing into Ashfield. In Ashfield, the route becomes Main Street, before it has a wrong-way concurrency with Route 112 for nearly a mile and a half. the route then turns westward, passing Spruce Corner on its way back into Hampshire County and the town of Plainfield. The route acts as the main road through the town before meeting Route 8A near the Dubuque Memorial State Forest. The two routes head westward into Berkshire County and the town of Savoy. In Savoy, Route 8A heads south while Route 116 heads westward into the town of Cheshire. Route 116 passes through the northeast corner of town before entering Adams and finally terminating at Route 8 in the southern end of Downtown Adams.

== History ==
Prior to 1955, Route 116 did not have a concurrency with Route 9 or enter Hadley. Rather, it continued along Pleasant Street and North Pleasant Street, passing along the eastern side of UMass before meeting Sunderland Road, where it rejoins the current route. This was done to lessen traffic along the edge of the campus. When the route was moved, Route 63's southern terminus was also moved along Meadow Street to connect it back to Route 116.

Before the introduction of Interstate 91, Route 116 extended down to the Memorial Bridge in Springfield where U.S. Route 5 and U.S. Route 20 crossed the river at the time.

In 2012, part of the road near Atkins Farm in Amherst was relocated to the east to remove a sharp curve in the road. This was done via the construction of two neighboring roundabouts.

== Major intersections ==
County	Location	mi	km	Destinations	Notes
Hampden	Springfield	0.00	0.00	Route 20A – East Springfield	Southern terminus
Hampden	Springfield	0.9	1.4	I-91 north – Chicopee, Holyoke, Greenfield	Exit 8 on I-91
Hampden	Chicopee	2.2	3.5	I-391 to I-91 – Holyoke, Springfield, Greenfield	Exit 2 on I-391; diamond interchange
Hampden	Chicopee	3.3	5.3	I-391 – Holyoke, Springfield	Exit 3 on I-391; partial cloverleaf interchange
Hampden	Chicopee	5.8	9.3	Route 141 east to I-391 – Chicopee Falls, Willimansett	Southern end of Route 141 concurrency
Hampden	Holyoke	7.6	12.2	Route 141 west – Holyoke Center, Easthampton	Northern end of Route 141 concurrency
Hampshire	South Hadley	9.4	15.1	US 202 – Granby, Belchertown, Holyoke, Westfield	Cloverleaf intersection
Hampshire	South Hadley	10.4	16.7	Route 33 south – Chicopee Falls, Ludlow	Northern terminus of Route 33
Hampshire	South Hadley	12.2	19.6	Route 47 north – Hadley, Sunderland	Southern terminus of Route 47
Hampshire	Amherst	21.5	34.6	Route 9 east – Belchertown	Southern end of Route 9 concurrency
Hampshire	Hadley	22.8	36.7	Route 9 west – Northampton, Pittsfield	Northern end of Route 9 concurrency
Hampshire	Amherst	26.1	42.0	Route 63 north – North Amherst, Northfield	Southern terminus of Route 63
Franklin	Sunderland	30.9	49.7	Route 47 – Montague, Millers Falls, Hadley	
Franklin	Whately	32.7	52.6	US 5 south / Route 10 south – Whately	Southern end of US 5/Route 10 concurrency
Franklin	Deerfield	33.6	54.1	US 5 north / Route 10 north – Greenfield	Northern end of US 5/Route 10 concurrency
Franklin	Deerfield	33.8	54.4	I-91 north – Greenfield, Brattleboro, VT	Southbound exit and northbound entrance; exit 36 on I-91
Franklin	Ashfield	47.2	76.0	Route 112 north – Buckland	Southern end of Route 112 concurrency
Franklin	Ashfield	48.6	78.2	Route 112 south – Goshen	Northern end of Route 112 concurrency
Hampshire	Plainfield	57.8	93.0	Route 8A north – Hawley, Charlemont	Southern end of Route 8A concurrency
Berkshire	Savoy	63.5	102.2	Route 8A south – Windsor	Northern end of Route 8A wrong-way concurrency
Berkshire	Adams	68.26	109.85	Route 8 to Route 2 – North Adams, Pittsfield	Northern terminus
1.000 mi = 1.609 km; 1.000 km = 0.621 mi: Concurrency terminus; Incomplete access
