= Massachusetts Route 141 =

State highway in Massachusetts, US

Route 141
- Route 141 highlighted in red

Route information
- Maintained by MassDOT
- Length: 17.18 mi (27.65 km)

Major junctions
- West end: Route 10 in Easthampton
- I-91 in Holyoke; US 5 / US 202 in Holyoke; I-391 in Chicopee
- East end: US 20 in Springfield

Location
- Country: United States
- State: Massachusetts
- Counties: Hampshire, Hampden

Highway system
- Massachusetts State Highway System; Interstate; US; State
← Route 140	→ Route 142

Route 141 is a 17.18-mile-long (27.65 km) west–east state highway in the U.S. state of Massachusetts. Its western terminus is at Route 10 in Easthampton. Its eastern terminus is at US 20 (US 20) in Springfield, a terminus it shares with Route 21. Route 141 gained notoriety in the local media in July 2005 when signage posted by contractors at the junction with Route 10 in Easthampton was posted incorrectly in the form of signage seen in Alabama.

== Route description ==
Route 141 begins at an intersection with Route 10 (Main Street) just north of Park Street in Eashampton. Route 141 proceeds south along Union Street through downtown Easthampton, passing multiple blocks of buildings and crossing a rail trail near Railroad Street. The route passes a strip mall at the southern end of Easthampton's downtown, reaching a junction with Payson Avenue. At this junction, Route 141 takes over Payson Avenue’s right-of-way as Cottage Street, passing an old factory in Easthampton along with nearby Nashawannuck Pond.

Route 141 continues east along Cottage Street, passing local businesses. At Chapel Street, the route turns south along the right-of-way and becomes Holyoke Street, running southeast past residences in Easthampton, keeping a long distance parallel with Nashawannuck Pond. Route 141 continues southeast along Holyoke, with the residences becoming less dense as it approaches East Street. At the junction with Hendrick Street, Route 141 turns south and becomes Mountain Road as it runs along the side of Mount Tom. Making a bend to the southeast, the highway crosses the Hampshire County line and crosses into Hampden County.

Now in Holyoke, Route 141 continues southeast as Easthampton Road, crossing roads south of Mount Tom. Crossing through the Rock Valley section of Holyoke, the highway passes south of the Whiting Reservoir and Wyckoff Country Club, entering the Smiths Valley section. Through Smiths Valley, Route 141 runs southeast through a residential neighborhood, reaching a ramp to Interstate 91 southbound (I-91 exit 17). After another turn, the route crosses into a trumpet interchange with I-91 northbound, becoming a one-way couplet through downtown Holyoke.

Route 141 eastbound runs along Dwight Street while Route 141 westbound runs along Hampden Street after the junctions both directions have with US 5 and US 202 (Northampton Street). Route 141 eastbound is a main commercial street while the westbound one is a residential and commercial mix. Crossing through the Oakdale neighborhood in Holyoke, Route 141 eastbound and westbound merge at the junction with Pleasant Street. The route runs southeast along Appleton Street, crossing Beech Street, also a section of US 202.

A main street through southeastern Holyoke, Route 141 is a two-lane road through the center of Oakdale. Passing a large factory, the route crosses over the First Level Canal, passes another factory and over the Second Level Canal. After crossing the canal, Route 141 immediately turns southwest off Appleton Street and turns onto Race Street. Two blocks south of Appleton, Route 141 reaches Cabot Street, where it turns east, meeting with Route 116 at Main Street. Route 141 and Route 116 become concurrent through Holyoke along Cabot Street. The routes cross the Third Level Canal and cross some railroad tracks.

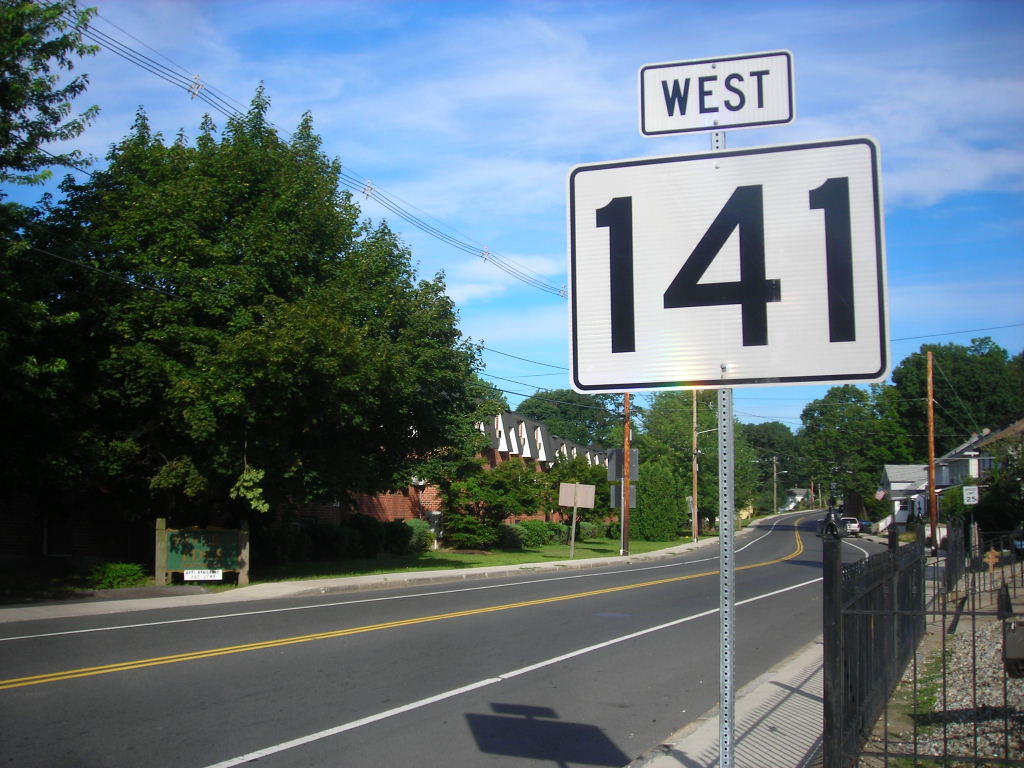
An unusually large Route 141 west shield in Chicopee Falls

Route 141 and Route 116 cross an extra pair of railroad tracks before crossing the Connecticut River on what becomes Chicopee Street as it enters Chicopee. After the routes turn south off the bridge, they junction with Prospect Street before turning southwest along Chicopee. After crossing under I-391, the routes continue southwest for a while, until Grattan Street where Route 141 turns east. Running along Grattan Street, crossing over railroad tracks into an interchange with I-391's exit 4.

Route 141 continues southeast along Grattan Street into the Aldenville neighborhood of Chicopee as a residential and commercial street. After McKinstry Avenue, the route becomes commercial, bending further southeast while passing Aldenville Public Library and crossing under the Mass Pike (I-90). Now in the Sandy Hill neighborhood, Route 141 along Grattan Street as a commercial street, turning east along the Chicopee River. The route reached a junction with Route 33 (Memorial Drive).

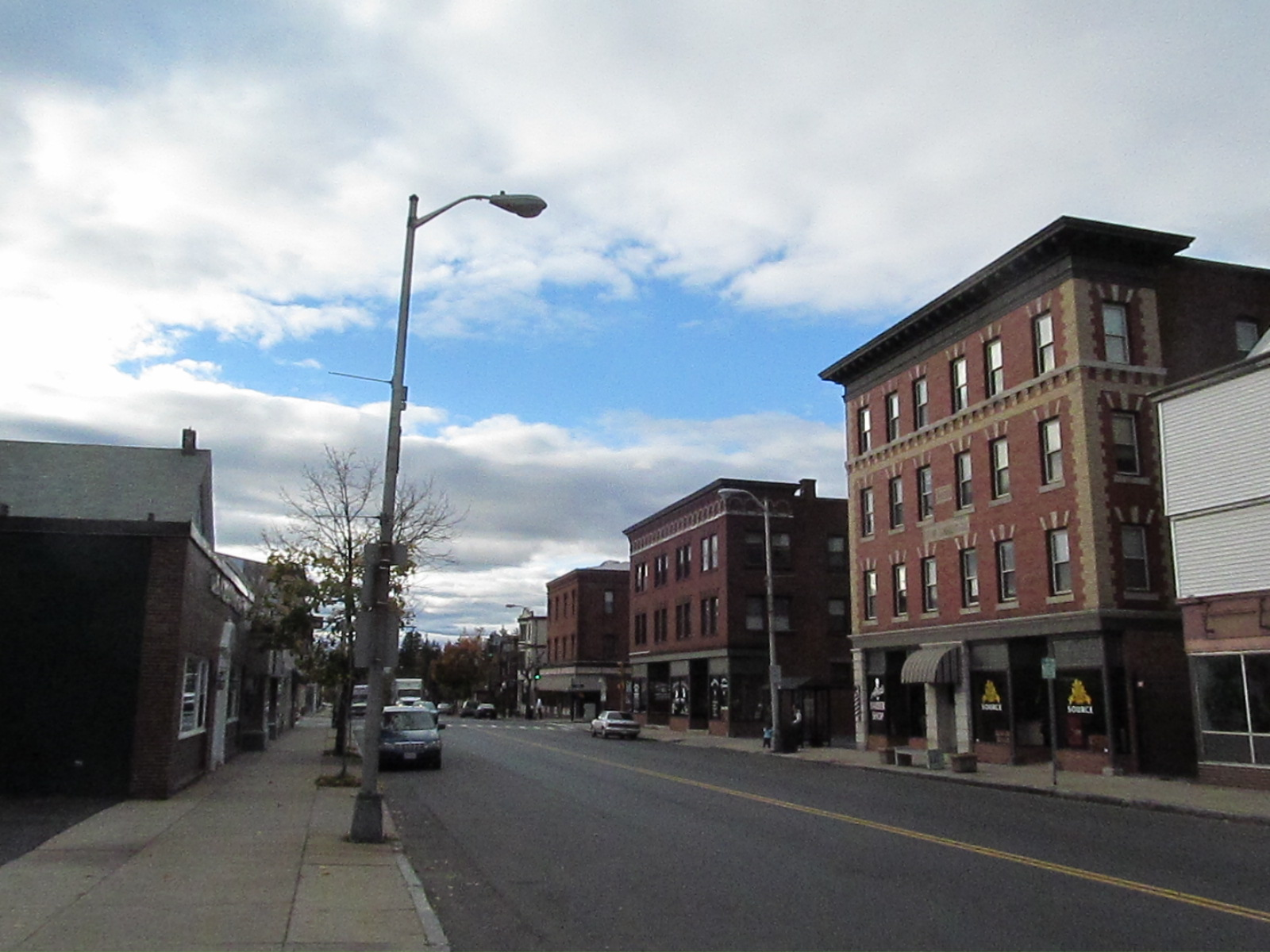
Route 141 through Indian Orchard

The route turns south along Bridge Street, crossing over the river, and turning east along East Main Street. Route 141 parallels the southern shore of the river, passing numerous residences in the Chicopee Falls neighborhood. After an intersection with Carew Street, the highway comes in striking distance of the river, entering an interchange with I-291's exit 6 via the American Legion Memorial Bridge. After I-291, Route 141 turns southeast along the river and changes names to Worcester Street as it crosses into Springfield. Entering the Indian Orchard neighborhood, the route stays straight as the Chicopee River turns north.

Now paralleling US 20, passing a large industrial plant near some railroad tracks. Route 141 then bends northeast and begins paralleling the railroad tracks along with the Chicopee River. A short distance after, Route 141 turns along Front Street before turning off onto Main Street, two blocks south of the Chicopee River. Route 141, paralleling the river and reaching Route 21 (Parker Street). Route 141 and Route 21 become concurrent, running southeast along Parker Street, running west along Hubbard Park. Route 21 and Route 141 run south as a four-lane road, reaching a junction with US 20 (Boston Road). This junction marks the eastern terminus of Route 141.

== History ==
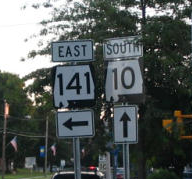
Erroneous signage in July 2005 denoting Route 141 and Route 10 in Easthampton as Alabama routes.

Route 141 and Route 10 gained notoriety in July 2005 when it was discovered that new signs had been put up at their junction in Easthampton. The road signs placed on Route 10 southbound were not done as a normal Massachusetts-style sign, but in the form of the Alabama-style sign. Unusually, these Alabama style shields were also squeezed to fit a normal Massachusetts shield design by a contractor. The signs had been posted about a week before the error had been forwarded to the Easthampton Department of Public Works by someone from the Massachusetts State Highway Department. They believed the contractor had taken out the Manual of Uniform Traffic Control Devices and chosen the Alabama shield. The signs would soon be replaced with correct Massachusetts shield.

== Major intersections ==
County	Location	mi	km	Destinations	Notes
Hampshire	Easthampton	0.000	0.000	Route 10 (Main Street) – Southampton, Westfield, Northampton, Greenfield	Western terminus
Hampden	Holyoke	4.309– 4.779	6.935– 7.691	I-91 south – Springfield, Hartford CT	No eastbound access to I-91 north; exit 15 on I-91
Hampden	Holyoke	5.009	8.061	US 5 south / US 202 (Northampton Street) – Mount Tom, Greenfield	
Hampden	Holyoke	5.925	9.535	US 202 north (Beech Street) – South Hadley, Belchertown	
Hampden	Holyoke	6.577	10.585	Route 116 north (Main Street) – South Hadley	Western end of Route 116 concurrency
Hampden	Holyoke–Chicopee line	7.223	11.624	Willimansett Bridge over the Connecticut River	
Hampden	Chicopee	8.005	12.883	Route 116 south (Chicopee Street)	Eastern end of Route 116 concurrency
Hampden	Chicopee	8.457– 8.792	13.610– 14.149	I-391 – Springfield, Holyoke	Exit 4 on I-391
Hampden	Chicopee	10.519	16.929	Route 33 north (Memorial Drive) – South Hadley	Southern terminus of Route 33
Hampden	Chicopee	12.389	19.938	To I-291 – Springfield	Access via American Legion Memorial Bridge
Hampden	Springfield	15.99	25.73	Route 21 north – Ludlow	Western end of Route 21 concurrency
Hampden	Springfield	17.18	27.65	US 20 – West Springfield, Westover AFB, Palmer Route 21 ends	Eastern terminus; southern terminus of Route 21
1.000 mi = 1.609 km; 1.000 km = 0.621 mi: Concurrency terminus; Incomplete access
