= Massachusetts Route 10 =

North-south state highway in Massachusetts, US

Route 10
- Route 10 highlighted in red

Route information
- Maintained by MassDOT
- Length: 60.69 mi (97.67 km)
- Existed: 1922–present

Major junctions
- South end: US 202 / Route 10 at the Connecticut state line near Southwick
- US 20 in Westfield; I-90 Toll / Mass Pike in Westfield; US 5 in Northampton and Bernardston; I-91 in Northampton, Hatfield, and Whately; Route 2 in Greenfield
- North end: NH 10 at the New Hampshire state line in Northfield

Location
- Country: United States
- State: Massachusetts
- Counties: Hampden, Hampshire, Franklin

Highway system
- Massachusetts State Highway System; Interstate; US; State
← Route C9	→ Route 11

Massachusetts Route 10 is a 60.69-mile-long (97.67 km) north–south state highway that runs from the Connecticut state line at Southwick to the New Hampshire state line at Northfield. Originally part of New England Route 10 from 1922 to 1927, it continues to the south as Connecticut Route 10, and to the north as New Hampshire Route 10.

== Route description ==
Route 10 crosses the border from Granby, Connecticut into Southwick, Massachusetts, overlapped with U.S. 202. It runs north through the Pioneer Valley towns of Southwick, Westfield, Southampton, Easthampton, Northampton, Hatfield, Whately, Deerfield, Greenfield, Bernardston, Gill, and Northfield. Route 10 has a long concurrency with U.S. 5 for about 25 miles (40 km) from Northampton to Bernardston, where it was sometimes called the "5 & 10 Highway". During this concurrency, it closely parallels Interstate 91, with five exits from Northampton to Deerfield, with close access at Route 2 in Greenfield and another exit, solely for Route 10, in Bernardston. It crosses the Connecticut River in Northfield before entering New Hampshire.

Route 10 is concurrent with seven other routes (US 5, US 20, US 202, and Massachusetts Routes 57, 9, 116, and 63) for 43 miles (69.20 km) of its nearly 61 miles (98.17 km) in the state with three points of triple concurrency, leaving less than a third of its length as the sole road designation.

== History ==
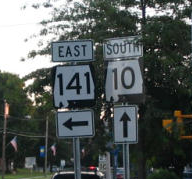
An "Alabama 10" sign as mistakenly posted in Easthampton

An odd sight greeted motorists in Easthampton in July 2005: standard issue Alabama state highway signs with the number 10 in a map of that state, instead of the standard Massachusetts square. This odd "Alabama 10" signage came about when a contractor mistakenly applied the sample from a federal manual. The signs have since been replaced with the correct shields.

== Major intersections ==
County	Location	mi	km	Destinations	Notes
Hampden	Southwick	0.0	0.0	US 202 south / Route 10 south – Salmon Brook	Continuation into Connecticut; southern terminus of concurrency with US 202
Hampden	Southwick	1.9	3.1	Route 168 east – West Suffield, CT, Suffield, CT	Western terminus of Route 168
Hampden	Southwick	4.3	6.9	Route 57 west – Granville, New Marlborough	Southern terminus of concurrency with Route 57
Hampden	Southwick	4.9	7.9	Route 57 east – Feeding Hills, Springfield	Northern terminus of concurrency with Route 57
Hampden	Westfield	9.6	15.4	US 20 east – Springfield, Palmer	Southern terminus of concurrency with US 20
Hampden	Westfield	9.9	15.9	US 20 west – Russell, Pittsfield	Northern terminus of concurrency with US 20
Hampden	Westfield	11.3	18.2	I-90 Toll / Mass Pike – Boston, Albany, NY	Exit 41 on I-90 / Mass Pike
Hampden	Westfield	14.3	23.0	US 202 north – Holyoke, Belchertown	Northern terminus of concurrency with US 202
Hampshire	Easthampton	21.8	35.1	Route 141 east – Holyoke	Western terminus of Route 141
Hampshire	Northampton	26.1	42.0	Route 9 west – Williamsburg, Pittsfield	Southern terminus of concurrency with Route 9
Hampshire	Northampton	26.4	42.5	Route 9 east / US 5 south – Amherst, Worcester, Holyoke, Springfield	Northern terminus of concurrency with Route 9; southern terminus of concurrency with US 5
Hampshire	Northampton	27.8	44.7	I-91 north – Greenfield, Brattleboro, VT	Exit 26 on I-91; northbound exit and southbound entrance
Hampshire	Northampton	29.6	47.6	I-91 – Springfield, Brattleboro, VT	Exit 27 on I-91; northbound access via Elm Street
Hampshire	Hatfield	32.0	51.5	I-91 south – Holyoke, Springfield	Exit 30 on I-91
Hampshire	Hatfield	32.3	52.0	I-91 north – Greenfield, Brattleboro, VT	Exit 30 on I-91
Franklin	Whately	34.0	54.7	I-91 north – Greenfield, Brattleboro VT	Northbound entrance
Franklin	Whately	34.7	55.8	I-91	Exit 32 on I-91; entrance from I-91 south
Franklin	Whately	37.1	59.7	I-91 south – Holyoke, Springfield	Exit 35 on I-91
Franklin	Whately	37.4	60.2	Route 116 south – Sunderland, Amherst	Southern terminus of concurrency with Route 116
Franklin	Deerfield	38.3	61.6	Route 116 north to I-91 north – Conway, Ashfield	Northern terminus of concurrency with Route 116
Franklin	Deerfield River	44.6	71.8	Deerfield River Bridge	
Franklin	Greenfield	46.0	74.0	Route 2A – Athol	Court Square, site of historic road marker
Franklin	Greenfield	47.7	76.8	Route 2 to I-91 – Boston, North Adams	Interchange
Franklin	Bernardston	52.5	84.5	US 5 north – Brattleboro VT, White River Jct., VT	Northern terminus of concurrency with US 5
Franklin	Bernardston	52.9	85.1	I-91 – Greenfield, Springfield, Brattleboro, VT, White River Jct., VT	Exit 50 on I-91
Franklin	Gill	55.5	89.3	Route 142 north – Northfield, Vernon, VT	Southern terminus of Route 142
Franklin	Connecticut River	56.8	91.4	Bennett's Meadow Bridge	
Franklin	Northfield	57.5	92.5	Route 63 south – Millers Falls, Amherst	Southern terminus of concurrency with Route 63
Franklin	Northfield	59.9	96.4	Route 63 north – Hinsdale, NH	Northern terminus of concurrency with Route 63
Franklin	Northfield	60.7	97.7	NH 10 north – Keene	Continuation into New Hampshire
1.000 mi = 1.609 km; 1.000 km = 0.621 mi: Concurrency terminus; Electronic toll collection; Incomplete access

== See also ==
- New England Interstate Route 10
