= Massachusetts Route 63 =

North-south state highway in Massachusetts, US

Route 63
- Route 63 highlighted in red

Route information
- Maintained by MassDOT
- Length: 24.048 mi (38.702 km)
- Tourist routes: Connecticut River Byway

Major junctions
- South end: Route 116 in Amherst
- Route 47 in Montague; Route 10 in Northfield
- North end: NH 63 in Winchester, NH

Location
- Country: United States
- State: Massachusetts
- Counties: Hampshire, Franklin

Highway system
- Massachusetts State Highway System; Interstate; US; State
← Route 62	→ Route 66

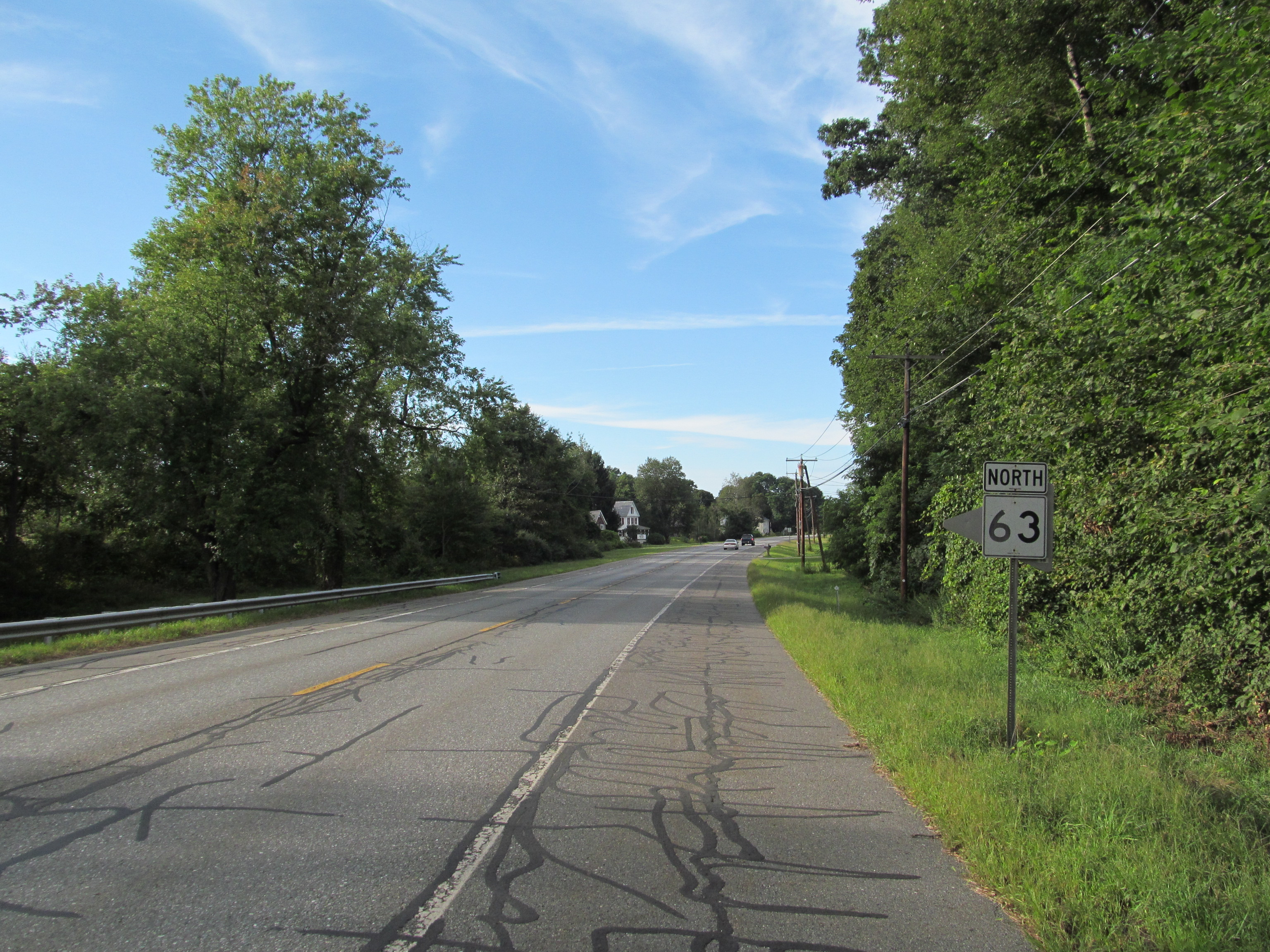
Northbound in Northfield

Route 63 is a 24.048-mile-long (38.702 km) state highway in Massachusetts, United States, running from Route 116 in Amherst north to the New Hampshire state line in Northfield, where it continues as New Hampshire Route 63. Along the way, it intersects several major highways, including Route 10 in Northfield.

== Route description ==
Route 63 begins at Route 116 at the north end of the UMass Amherst campus. It heads eastward for a third of a mile before turning onto Sunderland Road (the old alignment of Route 116) for fifty yards, before turning onto Montague Road. Montague Road passes through the western side of the town of Leverett, crossing the New England Central Railroad tracks before entering Sunderland for a short distance, crossing the tracks again before entering Montague. It meets the northern end of Route 47 south of Montague Center before passing Lake Pleasant and crossing the tracks twice more before crossing the Millers River at Millers Falls, entering the town of Erving.

In Erving, Route 63 passes under Route 2 (the Mohawk Trail) without direct access between the two. Signage on both roads directs traffic along Prospect Street (signed as "To 2 East" and "To 63 South") and along Forest Street (signed as "To 2 East" and "To 63 North"). Route 63 then heads north into Northfield, passing Northfield Mountain. It joins Route 10 (just east of Bennett's Meadow Bridge over the Connecticut River) for just under 2.5 miles (4.0 km), before splitting just south of the New Hampshire state line. It shortly turns northwestward before entering the town of Hinsdale and becoming New Hampshire Route 63.

== History ==
Route 63 was defined by 1929, running from Route 116 in Sunderland north along current Route 47 into Montague, and then along Sunderland Road, Turners Falls Road and Montague Road towards Turners Falls. South of Turners Falls, it turned east and merged with Route 2 (later Route 2A), which it took to Millers Falls. There it turned north onto its present alignment, ending at Route 10 in Northfield.

Ca. 1939, Route 63 was extended south from Sunderland along present Route 47, ending at Route 116 in South Hadley. Around the same time, it was shifted to its current alignment from south of Montague center (where Route 47 now cuts over to Route 63) north to Millers Falls. Finally, also around 1939, New Hampshire Route 10 was shifted onto a shorter route near the state line, resulting in a different crossing of the state line. The former Route 10 became New Hampshire Route 63, and Route 63 was extended north concurrent with Route 10, splitting near the state line along old Route 10.

In the late 1940s, Route 63 was shifted east from south of Montague center south to a new terminus at Route 116 in Amherst; the old route became Route 47. Finally, a new alignment of Route 116 west of Amherst center was built in 1958, and Route 63 was extended slightly west at its south end to the bypass.

== Major intersections ==
County	Location	mi	km	Destinations	Notes
Hampshire	Amherst	0.0	0.0	Route 116 to Route 9 – Hadley, Northampton, South Deerfield	Southern terminus
Franklin	Montague	8.4	13.5	Route 47 south – Sunderland, Hadley	Northern terminus of Route 47
Franklin	Erving	13.4– 13.8	21.6– 22.2	To Route 2 (Route 2A) – Boston, North Adams	Access via Forest Street/Gateway Drive
Franklin	Northfield	21.0	33.8	Route 10 south – Bernardston	Southern end of Route 10 concurrency
Franklin	Northfield	23.4	37.7	Route 10 north – Winchester, NH	Northern end of Route 10 concurrency
Franklin	Northfield	24.048	38.702	NH 63 north – Hinsdale, Brattleboro VT	Continuation into New Hampshire
1.000 mi = 1.609 km; 1.000 km = 0.621 mi: Concurrency terminus
