= Massachusetts Route 21 =

State highway in Massachusetts, US

Route 21
- Route 21 highlighted in red

Route information
- Maintained by MassDOT
- Length: 13.73 mi (22.10 km)

Major junctions
- South end: US 20 in Springfield
- I-90 / Mass Pike in Ludlow; US 202 / Route 181 in Belchertown
- North end: Route 9 in Belchertown

Location
- Country: United States
- State: Massachusetts
- Counties: Hampden, Hampshire

Highway system
- Massachusetts State Highway System; Interstate; US; State
← Route 20A	→ Route 22

Route 21 is a 13.73-mile-long (22.10 km) south–north state highway in Massachusetts that runs between U.S. Route 20 (US 20) and Route 141 in Springfield and Route 9 in Belchertown. Along the way it intersects several major highways including Interstate 90 (I-90) in Ludlow and US 202 and Route 181 in Belchertown.

== Route description ==
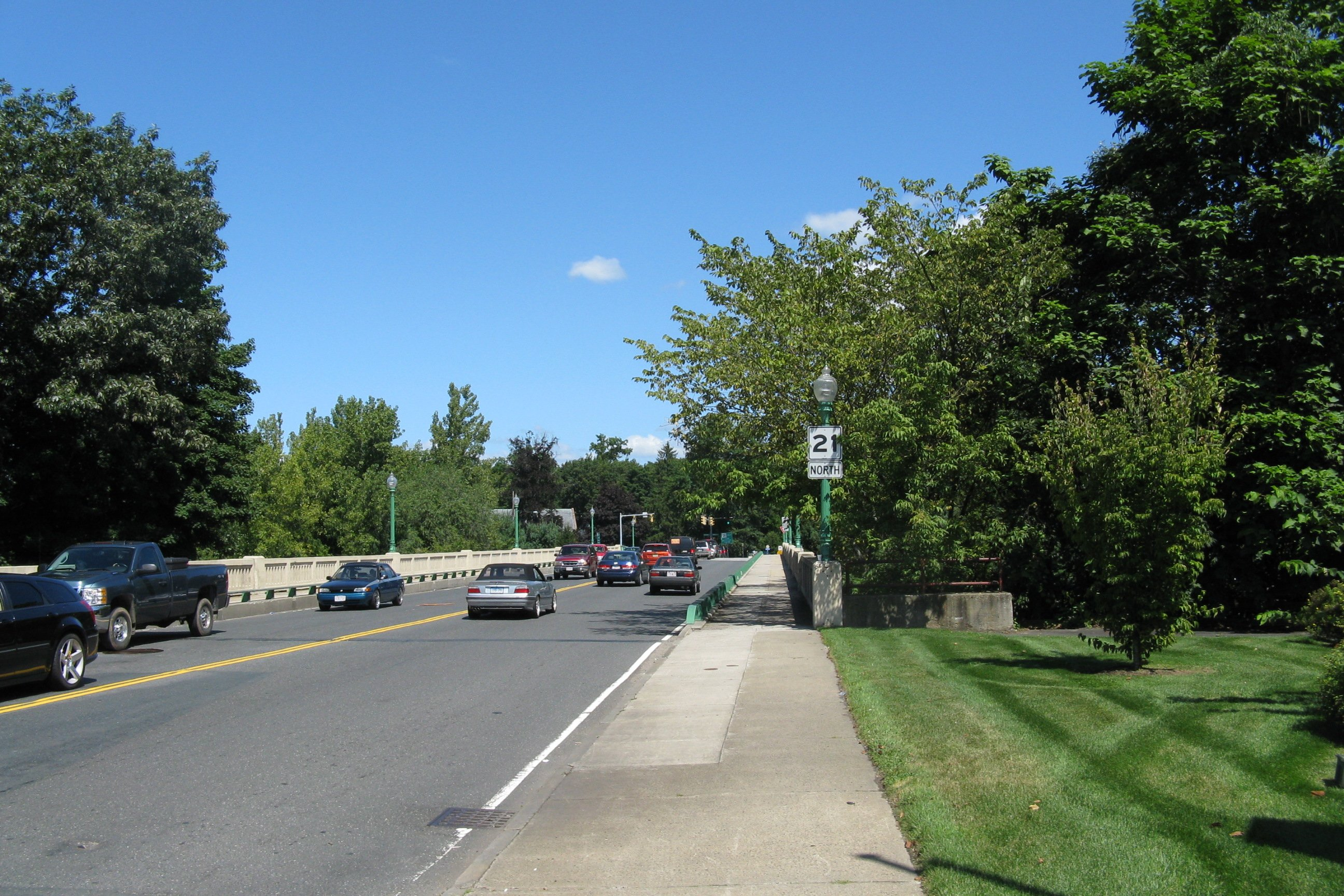
Route 21 northbound entering Ludlow

The route begins at U.S. Route 20 in the Indian Orchard section of Springfield. It heads north, intersecting with Route 141 before crossing the Chicopee River into Ludlow. Once in Ludlow, the road continues in a northeasterly direction. It passes under the Massachusetts Turnpike, with access to that road via Exit 54 (Old Exit 7). It continues through town, passing south of the Springfield Reservoir before heading northward into Belchertown. In Belchertown it shares a concurrency with U.S. Route 202, which ends at Route 181. From there Route 21 makes its final short trek to its current terminus at Route 9.

== History ==
Prior to the completion of the Quabbin Reservoir, Route 21 extended further northward. It passed through the former town of Enfield, then northward along the Swift River into Greenwich and the northern end of Dana before heading through the current town of Petersham and into Athol, where it terminated at what is now Route 2A. The southern portion of the road (Old Enfield Road) is still accessible in Belchertown. The northern trunk follows Pleasant Street and New Sherborn Road in Athol, then the Monson Turnpike (Turnpike Road) in Petersham, where the road has an intersection with Route 122. Much of the route south of this intersection lies within the Quabbin Reservoir State Reservation.

Into the 1970s, MA-21 started in Forest Park with an intersection with U.S. Route 5 near the South End Bridge. Today Interstate 91 now overtakes that intersection along with MA-83. From there, the route went down Longhill Street until it reached Sumner Street through the six-way intersection with Belmont Avenue and Dickinson Street, known to locals as the X. From there, the route went down Sumner Street until the intersection with Allen Street, which then made a turn onto Cooley Street at the Sixteen Acres section of town. From there, Cooley Street continued north into Parker Street to today's terminus, outside of Indian Orchard. There were plans to bypass this with the Springfield Bypass, but it was never completed.

== Major intersections ==
County	Location	mi	km	Destinations	Notes
Hampden	Springfield	0.00	0.00	US 20 – West Springfield, Westover AFB, Palmer Route 141 begins	Southern terminus; eastern terminus of Route 141
Hampden	Springfield	1.19	1.92	Route 141 west – Chicopee Falls, Holyoke	Northern end of Route 141 concurrency
Hampden	Ludlow	2.32	3.73	I-90 / Mass Pike – Springfield, Boston	Exit 54 on I-90 / Mass Pike
Hampshire	Belchertown	11.94	19.22	US 202 south – Granby	Southern end of US 202 concurrency
Hampshire	Belchertown	12.94	20.82	US 202 north / Route 181 south – Pelham, Bondsville, Palmer	Northern end of US 202 concurrency; northern terminus of Route 181
Hampshire	Belchertown	13.73	22.10	Route 9 – Amherst, Northampton, Ware, Worcester	Northern terminus
1.000 mi = 1.609 km; 1.000 km = 0.621 mi: Concurrency terminus
