= Interstate 391 =

Highway in Massachusetts

Interstate 391
- I-391 highlighted in red

Route information
- Auxiliary route of I-91
- Maintained by MassDOT
- Length: 4.46 mi (7.18 km)
- Existed: 1982–present
- NHS: Entire route

Major junctions
- South end: I-91 in Chicopee
- Route 116 in Chicopee; Route 141 in Chicopee
- North end: High Street in Holyoke

Location
- Country: United States
- State: Massachusetts
- Counties: Hampden

Highway system
- Interstate Highway System; Main; Auxiliary; Suffixed; Business; Future; Massachusetts State Highway System; Interstate; US; State
← Route 295	→ I-395

Interstate 391 (I-391) is an auxiliary Interstate Highway located entirely within the US state of Massachusetts. It runs from the I-91/I-391 interchange in Chicopee to the center of Holyoke, a distance of about 4.46 miles (7.18 km). It runs near the Connecticut River throughout its journey in Chicopee, crosses into Holyoke, and abruptly ends at High Street 0.4 miles (0.64 km) south of U.S. Route 202 (US 202).

== Route description ==
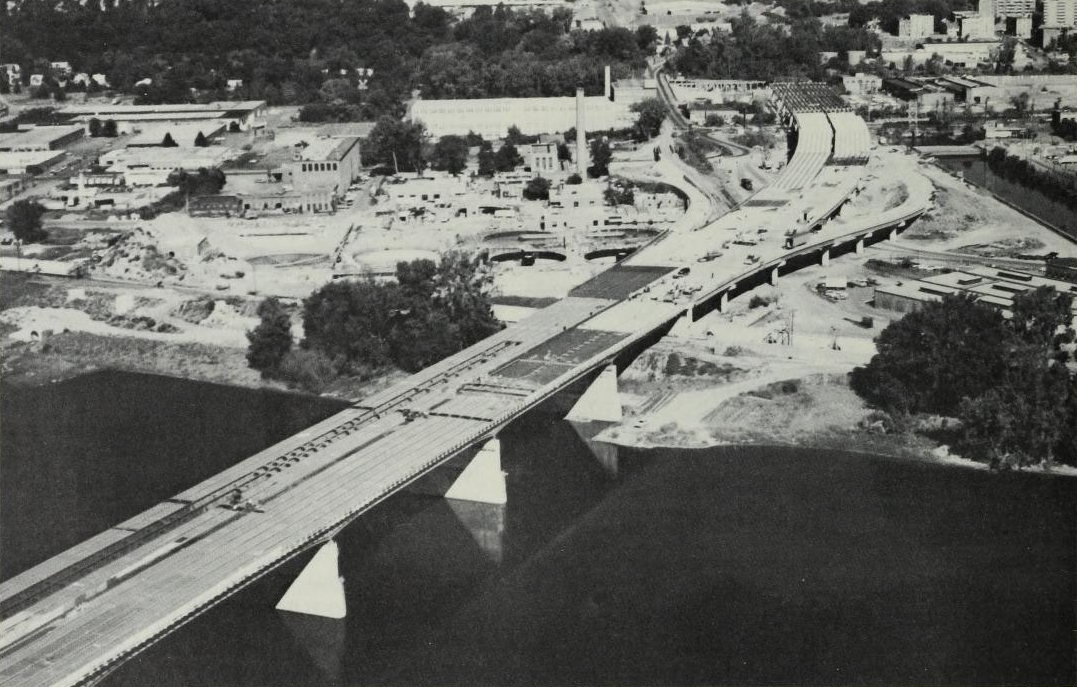
I-391 during construction, 1980

I-391 begins at an interchange with I-91 (at exit 9) in southern Chicopee, just north of the Atwater Park and the Calvary Cemetery. Initially running parallel to the Connecticut River, it intersects with Route 116 in Chicopee center and crosses the Chicopee River. I-391 then has another junction with Route 116 in the Sandy Hill section of town, and, in less than one mile (1.6 km)one mile (1.6 km), it crosses underneath the Massachusetts Turnpike without an interchange. I-391 continues north through the rest of northern Chicopee, intersecting Route 141 along the way and then passing just east of Rivers Park. I-391 then crosses the Connecticut River into the city of Holyoke, where it has two closely spaced exits for local streets in the town. I-391 officially comes to an end at High Street in Holyoke, with the road continuing as Resnic Boulevard, which connects to US 202 after 0.4 miles (0.64 km).

== History ==
Annual average daily traffic
Year	AADT
1982	17,200
1990	26,520
2000	31,000
2010	32,578
2018	37,164

Plans for the highway originated from the Master Highway Plan for the Springfield metropolitan area in 1953, which planned for a "major street improvement" to Route 116. By the 1960s, freeway access was needed between Chicopee and Holyoke to improve traffic flow which prompted a spur route of I-91 to be built. I-391's planned six lanes were built to handle up to 50,000 vehicles every day, and the total cost of the proposed highway was estimated at about $35 million (equivalent to $258 million in 2023). In 1965, an alignment of the highway had been set, along with two alternative alignments. Construction for I-391 began in 1967 with a short 0.75-mile-long (1.21 km) highway, which was completed in 1970. After years of no progress, construction started again in 1978. The highway was completed in 1982 after about 15 years of planning and construction.

An interchange with the Massachusetts Turnpike (I-90) was part of the original proposal, as it would have connected the turnpike to Chicopee and Holyoke, though it was never built.

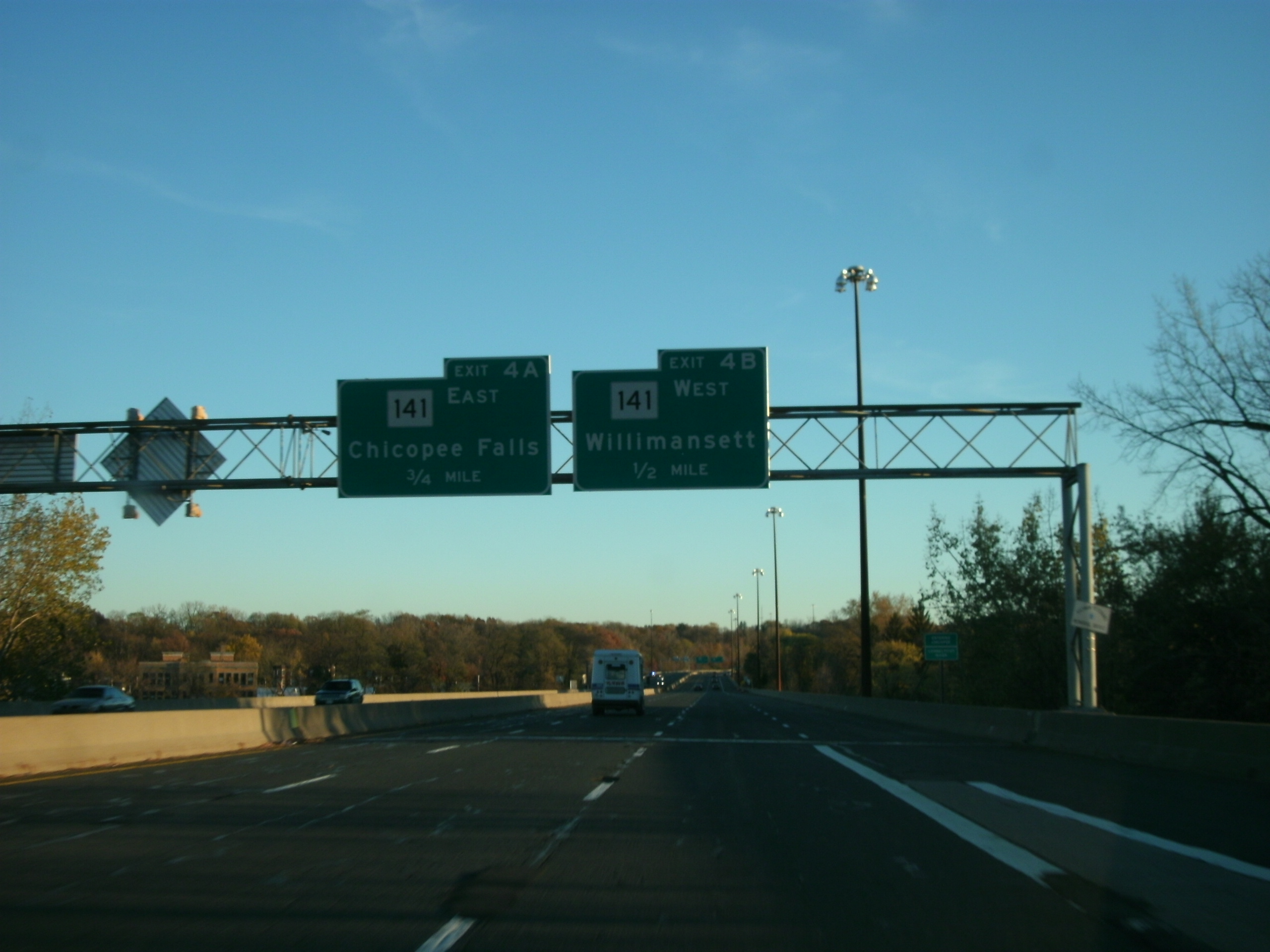
I-391 just before the Route 141 interchange

== Exit list ==
All exit numbers in Massachusetts were to eventually be renumbered to mileage-based numbers under a future project, but that project was postponed. On November 18, 2019, the Massachusetts Department of Transportation announced that I-391's exit numbers would not be changed because its exits were so tightly spaced.

The entire route is in Hampden County.

Location	mi	km	Exit	Destinations	Notes
Chicopee	0.00	0.00	1A	I-91 south – Springfield, Hartford, CT	Southern terminus
Chicopee	0.62	1.00	1B	I-91 north – Greenfield	Southbound exit and northbound entrance; exit 9 on I-91
Chicopee	0.95	1.53	2	Route 116 – Chicopee Center	To Elms College
Chicopee	1.90	3.06	3	Route 116 – Westover ARB, Willimansett	
Chicopee	3.86	6.21	4	Route 141 – Chicopee Falls, Willimansett	Signed as exits 4A (east) and 4B (west) southbound
Connecticut River	4.50	7.24	Bridge		
Holyoke	4.59	7.39	5	Main Street	Northbound exit and southbound entrance
Holyoke	4.94	7.95	6B	Commercial Street	Northbound exit and southbound entrance
Holyoke	5.16	8.30	6A	High Street	Northern terminus; at-grade intersection
1.000 mi = 1.609 km; 1.000 km = 0.621 mi: Incomplete access
