= Belchertown (CDP), Massachusetts =

Belchertown, Massachusetts
- Census-designated place
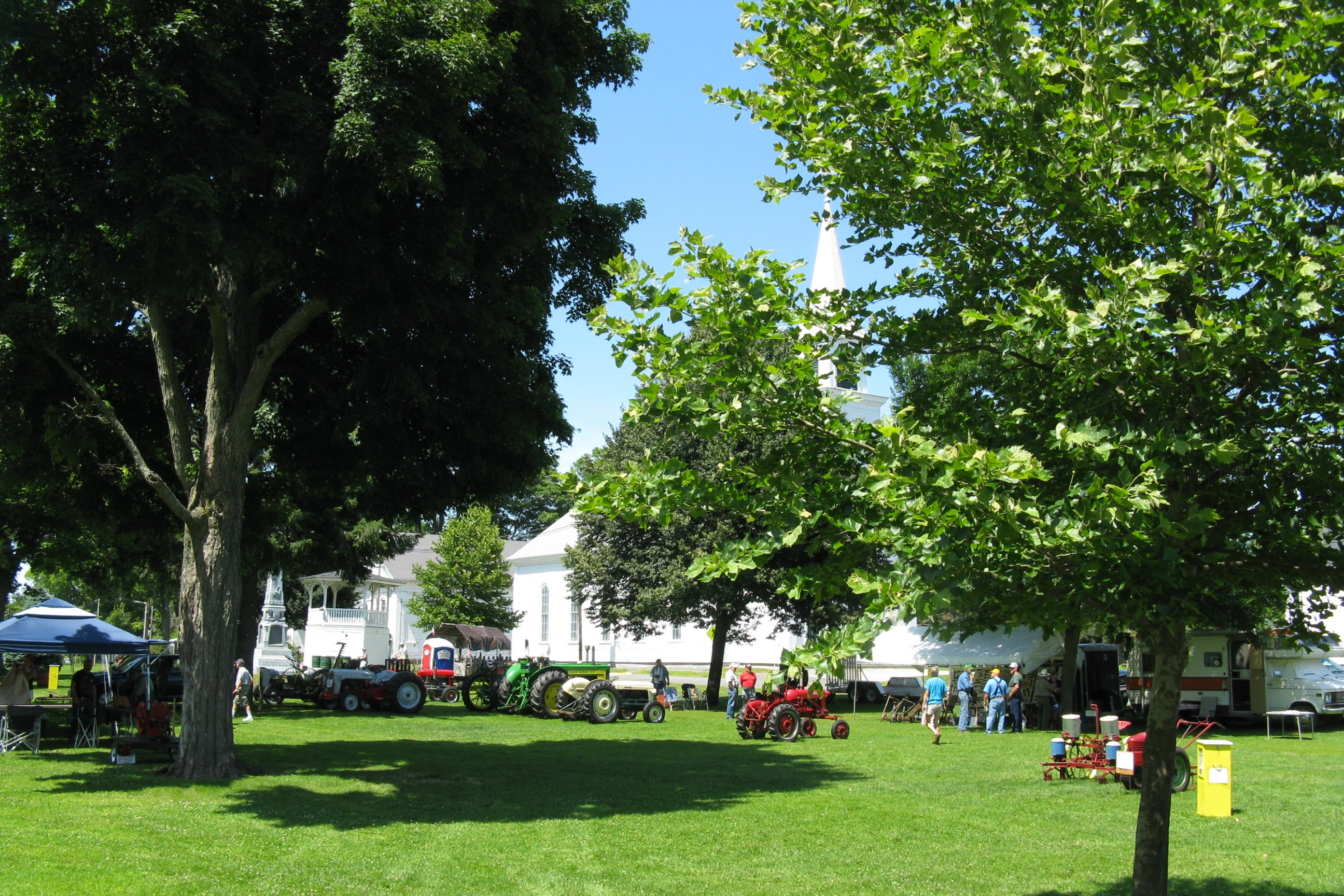
- Tractor show on the Common

- Location in Hampshire County in Massachusetts
- Coordinates: 42°16′42″N 72°24′6″W
- Country: United States
- State: Massachusetts
- County: Hampshire
- Town: Belchertown

Area
  - Total: 5.03 sq mi (13.04 km^{2})
  - Land: 5.03 sq mi (13.03 km^{2})
  - Water: 0.0039 sq mi (0.01 km^{2})
- Elevation: 607 ft (185 m)

Population (2020)
  - Total: 3,129
  - Density: 621.9/sq mi (240.13/km^{2})
- Time zone: UTC-5 (Eastern (EST))
  - Summer (DST): UTC-4 (EDT)
- ZIP code: 01007
- Area code: 413
- FIPS code: 25-04790
- GNIS feature ID: 0609121

Belchertown is a census-designated place (CDP) comprising the central village in the town of Belchertown in Hampshire County, Massachusetts, United States. The population was 2,899 at the 2010 census, out of a total town population of 14,649. It is part of the Springfield, Massachusetts Metropolitan Statistical Area.

== Geography ==
The Belchertown CDP is located in the center of the town of Belchertown at 42°16′42″N 72°24′6″W (42.278451, -72.401804). It is bordered to the north by Bay Road and Massachusetts Route 9 (Federal Street and Sargent Street), to the east by Jabish Brook and Jabish Canal, to the west by Broad Brook and Old Springfield Road, to the south by State Street (U.S. Route 202), and to the west by Weston Brook, Lampson Brook, George Hannum Street, and Hamilton Street.

Route 9 leads east 10 miles (16 km) to Ware and northwest 9 miles (14 km) to Amherst, while US 202 leads north 26 miles (42 km) to Athol and southwest 13 miles (21 km) to Holyoke. Massachusetts Route 181 leaves US 202 in the center of town, leading south 10 miles (16 km) to Palmer. Massachusetts Route 21 leaves US 202 at the western edge of the CDP, leading southwest 10 miles to Ludlow. Springfield, the largest city in the region, is 18 miles (29 km) southwest of Belchertown.

According to the United States Census Bureau, the CDP has a total area of 5.0 square miles (13.0 km^{2}), of which 1.4 acres (5,582 m^{2}), or 0.04%, are water.

== Demographics ==
Historical population
Census	Pop.	Note	%±
2020	3,129		—
U.S. Decennial Census

As of the census of 2000, there were 2,626 people, 1,094 households, and 717 families residing in the CDP. The population density was 201.2 people/km^{2} (521 people/mi^{2}). There were 1,111 housing units at an average density of 85.1 units/km^{2} (220 units/mi^{2}). The racial makeup of the CDP was 94.14% White, 1.26% Black or African American, 0.23% Native American, 1.79% Asian, 0.04% Pacific Islander, 0.84% from other races, and 1.71% from two or more races. Hispanic or Latino of any race were 2.13% of the population.

There were 1,094 households, out of which 37.7% had children under the age of 18 living with them, 43.9% were married couples living together, 18.4% had a female householder with no husband present, and 34.4% were non-families. 27.6% of all households were made up of individuals, and 11.1% had someone living alone who was 65 years of age or older. The average household size was 2.40 and the average family size was 2.91.

In the CDP, the population was spread out, with 27.1% under the age of 18, 8.5% from 18 to 24, 33.3% from 25 to 44, 20.5% from 45 to 64, and 10.6% who were 65 years of age or older. The median age was 34 years. For every 100 females, there were 82.6 males. For every 100 females age 18 and over, there were 77.9 males.

The median income for a household in the CDP was $40,250, and the median income for a family was $44,286. Males had a median income of $31,377 versus $31,130 for females. The per capita income for the CDP was $18,485. About 16.8% of families and 15.1% of the population were below the poverty line, including 18.0% of those under age 18 and 10.6% of those age 65 or over.
