= Massachusetts Route 181 =

North-south state highway in Massachusetts, US

Route 181
- Route 181 highlighted in red

Route information
- Maintained by MassDOT
- Length: 9.43 mi (15.18 km)

Major junctions
- South end: US 20 in Palmer
- North end: US 202 / Route 21 in Belchertown

Location
- Country: United States
- State: Massachusetts
- Counties: Hampden, Hampshire

Highway system
- Massachusetts State Highway System; Interstate; US; State
← Route 177	→ Route 183

Route 181 is a 9.43-mile-long (15.18 km) north–south state highway in Massachusetts starting at an intersection with U.S. Route 20 in Palmer, located in Hampden County. The route crosses the Mass Pike (Interstate 90), but does not intersect. The route crosses through the Bondsville section of Palmer, crossing into Hampshire County, where it enters Belchertown. In Belchertown, Route 181 comes to an end at a junction with the concurrent U.S. Route 202 (US 202) and Route 21.

== Route description ==
Route 181 begins at an intersection with U.S. Route 20 (Wilbraham Street / North Main Street) in Palmer. The route proceeds north along Sykes Street, crossing through downtown Palmer. After Fletcher Street, Route 181 proceeds north under the Mass. Pike (I-90) and parallels the Quaboag River. Leaving downtown Palmer, the route crosses over some railroad tracks and the two-lane road makes a dart to the northwest before Bourne Street. After Bourne Street, Route 181 continues north on Sykes Street, crossing Main Street in the center of a commercial section.

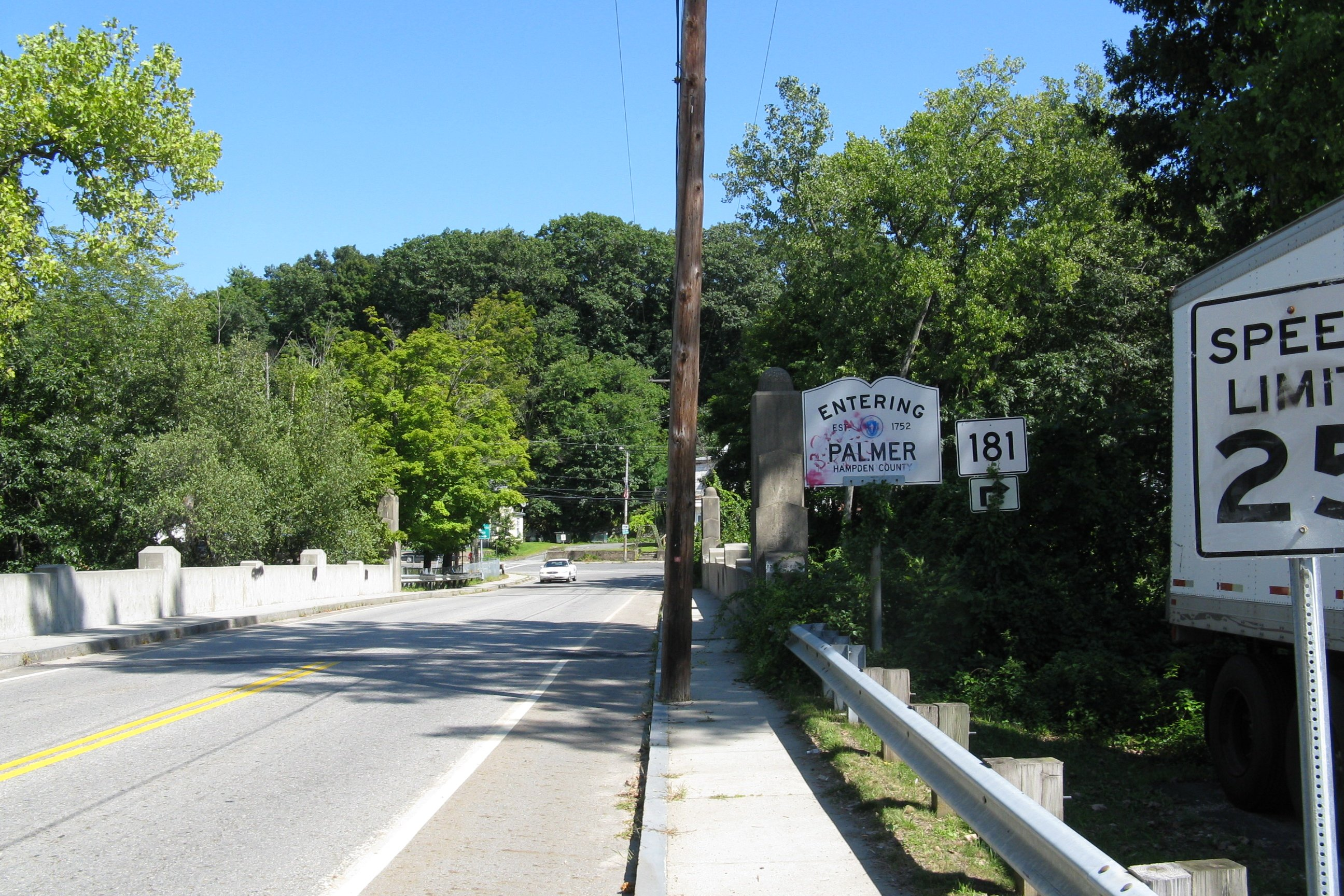
Route 181 southbound on Depot Street entering the Bondsville section of Palmer

Route 181 continues north through Palmer, dropping the Sykes Street name, which becomes Palmer Street. After crossing the Ware River, the route turns northeast and becomes South Main Street, turning north as it approaches Lilly Pond. At Pine Street, Route 181 crosses north through Bondsville, at the north end of Bondsville, the route leaves Hampden County for Hampshire County. Now in Belchertown, Route 181 turns west on Depot Street, At the junction with Franklin Street, the route turns northwest, crossing through rural sections of Belchertown, running along Franklin Street.

Route 181 passes a local community of residences, serving as the main north–south street. Passing the Mill Valley Country Club, the route turns northwest at Cold Spring Road and becomes known as Mill Valley Road. After a northwestern stretch through the town of Belchertown, Route 181 enters downtown Belchertown, retaining the Mill Valley Road name until its junction with South Main Street, where it takes the latter as a moniker, proceeding northwest another block to US 202 and Route 21 (Maple Street).

== Major intersections ==
County	Location	mi	km	Destinations	Notes
Hampden	Palmer	0.00	0.00	US 20 to I-90 – Palmer Center, Wilbraham	Southern terminus; to exit 63 on I-90 / Mass Pike (formerly exit 8)
Hampshire	Belchertown	9.43	15.18	US 202 / Route 21 – Ware, Worcester, Ludlow, Holyoke	Northern terminus
1.000 mi = 1.609 km; 1.000 km = 0.621 mi
