= Massachusetts Route 47 =

North–south state highway in Massachusetts, US

Route 47
- Route 47 highlighted in red

Route information
- Maintained by MassDOT
- Length: 21.93 mi (35.29 km)

Major junctions
- South end: Route 116 in South Hadley
- Route 9 in Hadley; Route 116 in Sunderland
- North end: Route 63 in Montague

Location
- Country: United States
- State: Massachusetts
- Counties: Hampshire, Franklin

Highway system
- Massachusetts State Highway System; Interstate; US; State
← Route 45	→ Route 49

Route 47 is a 21.93-mile-long (35.29 km) north–south state highway in the Pioneer Valley region of the U.S. state of Massachusetts. Its southern terminus is at Route 116 in South Hadley and its northern terminus is at Route 63 in Montague.

== Route description ==
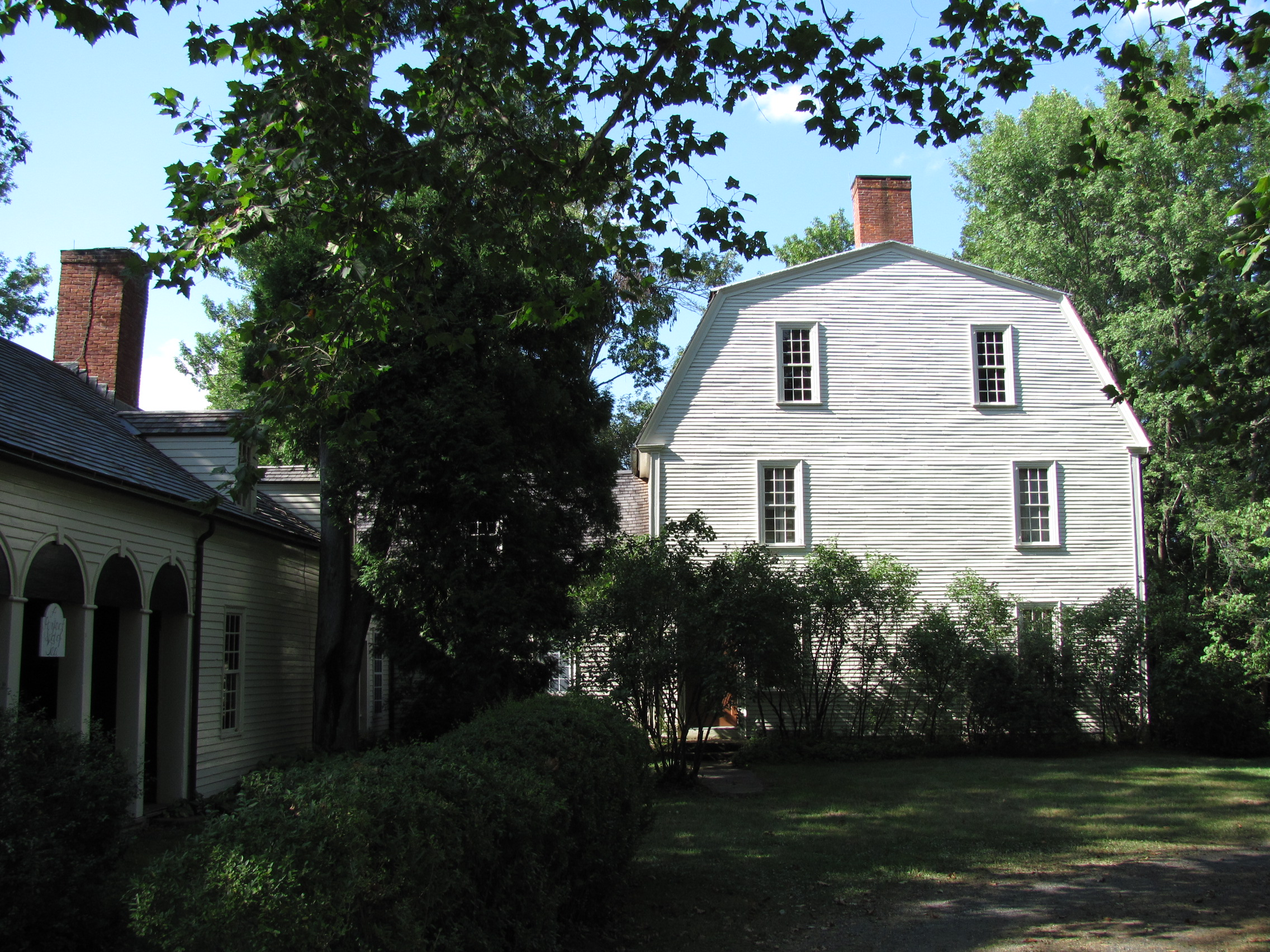
The Porter-Phelps Huntington House lies along Route 47 in Hadley.

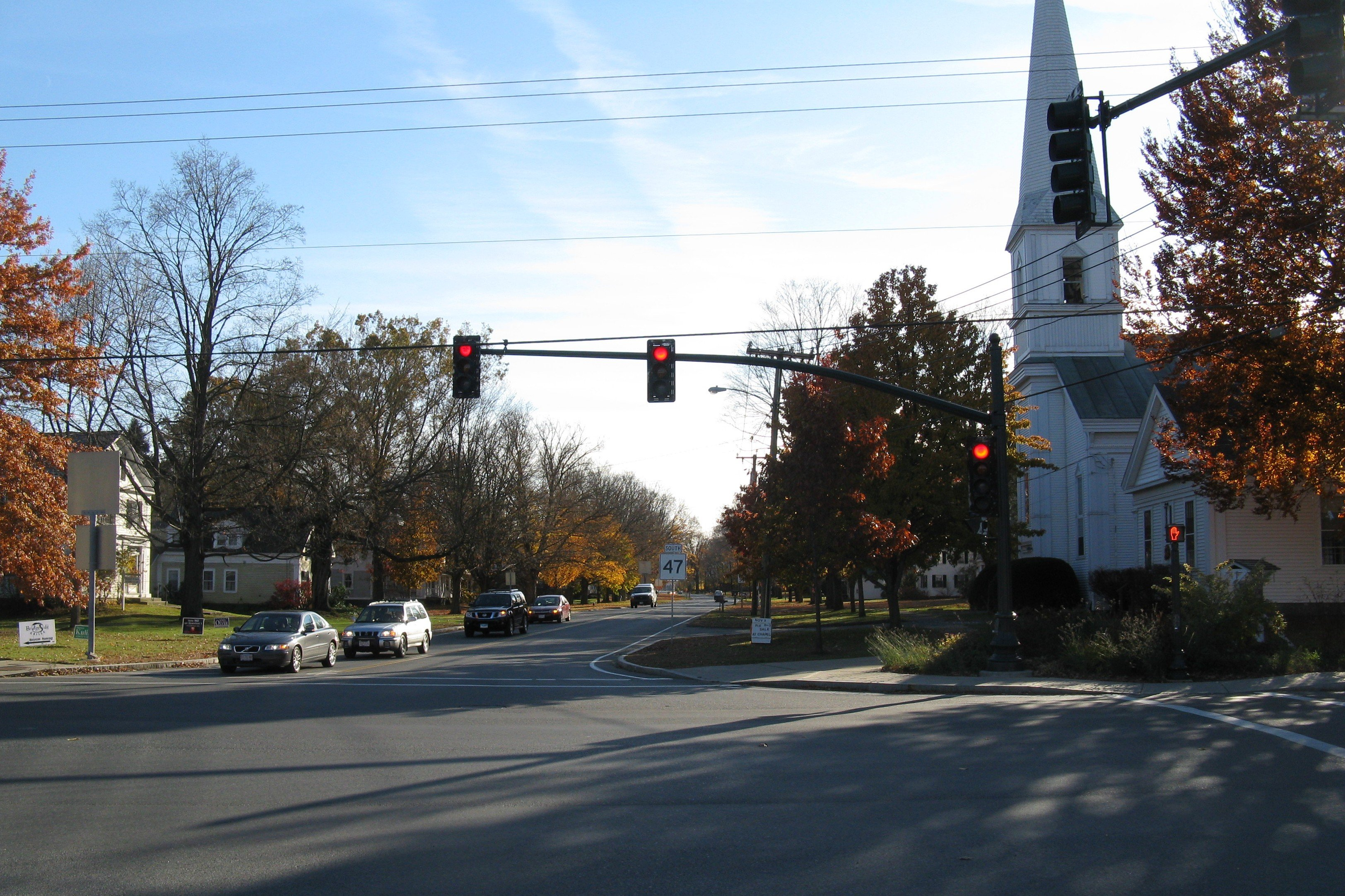
Southbound on Route 47 in Sunderland Center

Route 47 begins at Route 116 in South Hadley near the northwest corner of the Mount Holyoke College campus. It heads northwestward towards the southwest corner of Hadley, crossing into that town near the Hockanum Flat, a bend in the Connecticut River. It then follows within half a mile of the river before turning onto Middle Street, crossing through the town center and intersecting Route 9 just over a mile east of the Calvin Coolidge Bridge into Northampton.

Route 47 turns right when Middle Street meets the river again, following the river's path into the North Hadley section of town, passing the Porter-Phelps-Huntington House and the North Hadley Sugar Shack along the way. It then passes into the town of Sunderland. In Sunderland it continues along the east banks of the river, intersecting Route 116 once more in that town's center, just east of the Sunderland Bridge. It then bends northeastward, and ends just a half-mile into the Montague Center village of Montague at Route 63.

== Major intersections ==
County	Location	mi	km	Destinations	Notes
Hampshire	South Hadley	0.00	0.00	Route 116 (Woodbridge Street) – Amherst, Holyoke	Southern terminus
Hampshire	Hadley	7.70	12.39	Route 9 (Russell Street) – Amherst, Worcester, Northampton, Pittsfield	Also serves UMass Amherst
Franklin	Sunderland	17.10	27.52	Route 116 (Bridge Street/Amherst Road) – Amherst, South Deerfield, Ashfield	
Franklin	Montague	21.93	35.29	Route 63 (Federal Street) – Amherst, Northfield	Northern terminus
1.000 mi = 1.609 km; 1.000 km = 0.621 mi
