= Granby (CDP), Massachusetts =

Granby, Massachusetts
- Census-designated place
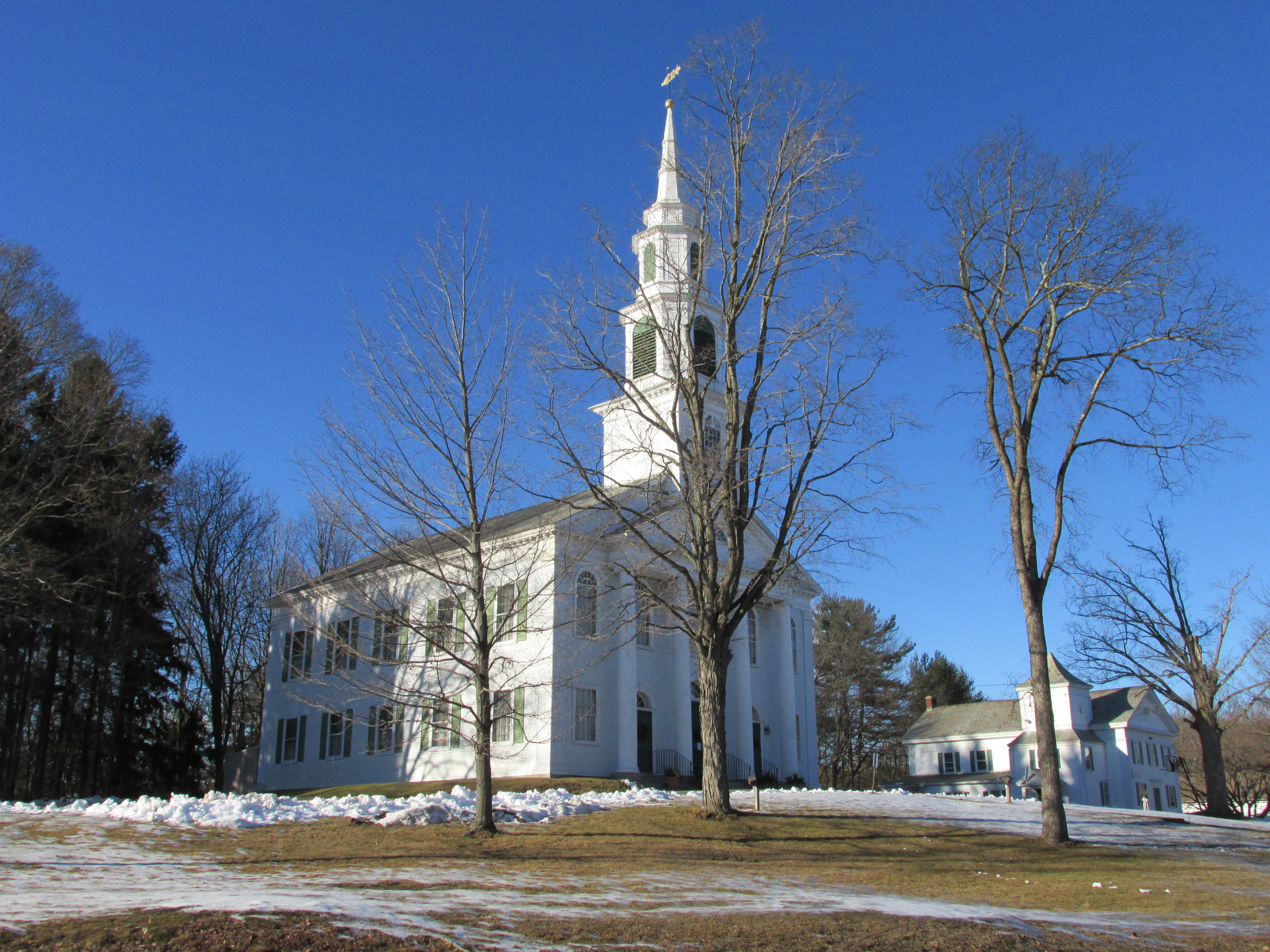
- The Church of Christ Congregational

- Location in Hampshire County in Massachusetts
- Coordinates: 42°15′29″N 72°31′19″W
- Country: United States
- State: Massachusetts
- County: Hampshire
- Town: Granby

Area
  - Total: 3.48 sq mi (9.01 km^{2})
  - Land: 3.47 sq mi (9.00 km^{2})
  - Water: 0.0039 sq mi (0.01 km^{2})
- Elevation: 312 ft (95 m)

Population (2020)
  - Total: 1,306
  - Density: 376/sq mi (145.1/km^{2})
- Time zone: UTC-5 (Eastern (EST))
  - Summer (DST): UTC-4 (EDT)
- ZIP code: 01033
- Area code: 413
- FIPS code: 25-26500
- GNIS feature ID: 0609013

Granby is a census-designated place (CDP) comprising the main village in the town of Granby in Hampshire County, Massachusetts, United States. The population of the CDP was 1,368 at the 2010 census, out of a total town population of 6,240. It is part of the Springfield, Massachusetts Metropolitan Statistical Area.

== Geography ==
The Granby CDP is located in the west-central part of the town of Granby at 42°15′29″N 72°31′18″W (42.258128, -72.52186). It includes the village of Granby plus rural land to the west, north and east. U.S. Route 202 (State Street) forms much of the southern edge of the CDP, except around the village center, where the border extends to the south along Center Street and Taylor Street. Elsewhere, the CDP extends east to Greenmeadow Lane and Ingraham Brook; north to Batchelor Brook, Batchelor Street, and Easton Street; and west to Amherst Street and Cold Hill Road.

US 202 leads east 6 miles (10 km) to Belchertown and southwest 7 miles (11 km) to Holyoke. South Hadley is 3 miles (5 km) to the west, via West Street, and downtown Springfield is 13 miles (21 km) to the south.

According to the United States Census Bureau, the Granby CDP has a total area of 23 square kilometres (9.0 sq mi), of which 0.004 square miles (0.01 km^{2}), or 0.11%, are water. The village is drained to the north by Batchelor Brook, a westward-flowing tributary of the Connecticut River, and to the south by tributaries of Stony Brook, which also flows west to the Connecticut.

== Demographics ==
Historical population
Census	Pop.	Note	%±
2020	1,306		—
U.S. Decennial Census

As of the census of 2000, there were 1,344 people, 530 households, and 357 families residing in the CDP. The population density was 149.5 people/km^{2} (387 people/mi^{2}). There were 541 housing units at an average density of 60.2 units/km^{2} (156 units/mi^{2}). The racial makeup of the CDP was 96.43% White, 0.67% Black or African American, 0.15% Native American, 0.45% Asian, 0.07% Pacific Islander, 1.04% from other races, and 1.19% from two or more races. Hispanic or Latino of any race were 2.31% of the population.

There were 530 households, out of which 27.7% had children under the age of 18 living with them, 56.8% were married couples living together, 7.7% had a female householder with no husband present, and 32.6% were non-families. 27.9% of all households were made up of individuals, and 15.7% had someone living alone who was 65 years of age or older. The average household size was 2.54 and the average family size was 3.12.

In the CDP, the population was spread out, with 21.7% under the age of 18, 7.7% from 18 to 24, 27.8% from 25 to 44, 26.3% from 45 to 64, and 16.5% who were 65 years of age or older. The median age was 41 years. For every 100 females, there were 89.8 males. For every 100 females age 18 and over, there were 86.2 males.

The median income for a household in the CDP was $51,250, and the median income for a family was $59,960. Males had a median income of $40,611 versus $31,964 for females. The per capita income for the CDP was $21,631. None of the families and 1.5% of the population were living below the poverty line, including no under eighteens and 3.0% of those over 64.
