= 2012 United States presidential election in Massachusetts =

- November 6, 2012
- Turnout: 73.3% (▼0.2 pp)

Nominee	Barack Obama	Mitt Romney
Party	Democratic	Republican
Home state	Illinois	Massachusetts
Running mate	Joe Biden	Paul Ryan
Electoral vote	11	0
Popular vote	1,921,761	1,188,460
Percentage	60.67%	37.52%

Obama
40–50%
50–60%
60–70%
70–80%
80–90%
90–100%
Romney
40–50%
50–60%
60–70%
Tie
President before election
Barack Obama
Democratic
Elected President
Barack Obama
Democratic

The 2012 United States presidential election in Massachusetts took place on November 6, 2012, as part of the 2012 United States presidential election in which all 50 states plus the District of Columbia participated. Massachusetts voters chose 11 electors to represent them in the Electoral College via a popular vote pitting incumbent Democratic President Barack Obama and his running mate, Vice President Joe Biden, against Republican challenger and former Massachusetts Governor Mitt Romney and his running mate, Congressman Paul Ryan.

Although Romney previously served as Massachusetts's Governor from 2003 to 2007, Massachusetts was considered to be a state Obama would win or a safe blue state. Obama ultimately won Massachusetts with 60.67% of the popular vote to Romney's 37.52%, thus winning the state's 11 electoral votes by a 23.15% margin of victory. This was the first time a presidential candidate lost his home state since Al Gore lost Tennessee in the 2000 election. Romney also became the first Republican candidate to lose his home state since Richard Nixon lost his then-home state of New York to Hubert Humphrey in 1968. Additionally, Romney became the first major party nominee to lose their home state by twenty or more percentage points in 80 years; this would happen again four years later when Donald Trump lost his then-home state of New York by 22 points. (Note: New York was won by Democratic nominee Hillary Clinton, whose home state was also New York)

Massachusetts has been a Democratic-leaning state since 1928, and a Democratic stronghold since 1960, with the only Republican to carry the state since then being Ronald Reagan, in 1980 and 1984. The Democratic nominee has won the state by over 20% in every election from 1996 onward and has also swept every county in the state from 1992 onward.

Despite his loss, Romney's 37.52% vote share still stands as of the 2024 presidential election as the highest Republican vote share in Massachusetts since 1988. Romney's 4.20% defeat in Plymouth County was the closest a Republican came to carrying any of Massachusetts' counties between 1988 and 2024 (when Donald Trump lost Bristol County by 1.3%).

The 2012 presidential election marks the most recent cycle that Romney would stand for public office as a resident of Massachusetts. He would be on the ballot again in 2018, but as a candidate for U.S. senator from Utah.

To date, this is the last time that the cities of Agawam and Palmer, and the towns of Acushnet, Blackstone, Chester, Freetown, Huntington, Leicester, Ludlow, Monroe, Monson, New Braintree, Russell, Swansea, Templeton, Wales, Ware, and Winchendon voted Democratic; and the last time the city of North Attleborough and the towns of Boxford, Boylston, Cohasset, Dover, Dunstable, Duxbury, Easton, Foxborough, Georgetown, Hamilton, Hingham, Holden, Hopkinton, Lancaster, Lunenburg, Marshfield, Medfield, Norfolk, North Andover, North Reading, Norwell, Paxton, Princeton, Sandwich, Scituate, Sturbridge, Topsfield, Upton, Walpole, Wenham, West Boylston, Westwood, Wilmington, and Wrentham voted Republican. This is also the most recent election which the towns of Hanover, Kingston, Lynnfield, Northbridge, Pembroke, Raynham, Rutland, Sutton, Tewksbury, Townsend, Uxbridge, Westminster, and Whitman would vote for the national losing candidate.

== Primary elections ==
=== Democratic primary ===
2012 Massachusetts Democratic presidential primary
- March 6, 2012
Candidate	Barack Obama
Party	Democratic
Home state	Illinois
Delegate count	110
Popular vote	127,909
Percentage	86.50%
- Massachusetts results by county Barack Obama

Incumbent president Barack Obama won the Massachusetts Democratic primary with 81% of the vote. He received no official opposition in the primary, with the other 19% of the vote going to "no preference," write-in candidates, or blank ballots. Through the primary and district caucuses, he won all of the state's 110 pledged delegates, which voted for him at the 2012 Democratic National Convention in Charlotte, North Carolina (the state also had 26 superdelegates).

Massachusetts Democratic primary, 2012
Candidate	Votes	Percentage	Delegates
Barack Obama (incumbent)	127,909	86.50%	110
No preference	16,075	10.87%	0
Write-ins	3,889	2.63%	0
Totals	147,873	100.00%	110

=== Republican primary ===
2012 Massachusetts Republican presidential primary
- March 6, 2012

43 Republican National Convention delegates The number of delegates received is determined by the popular vote

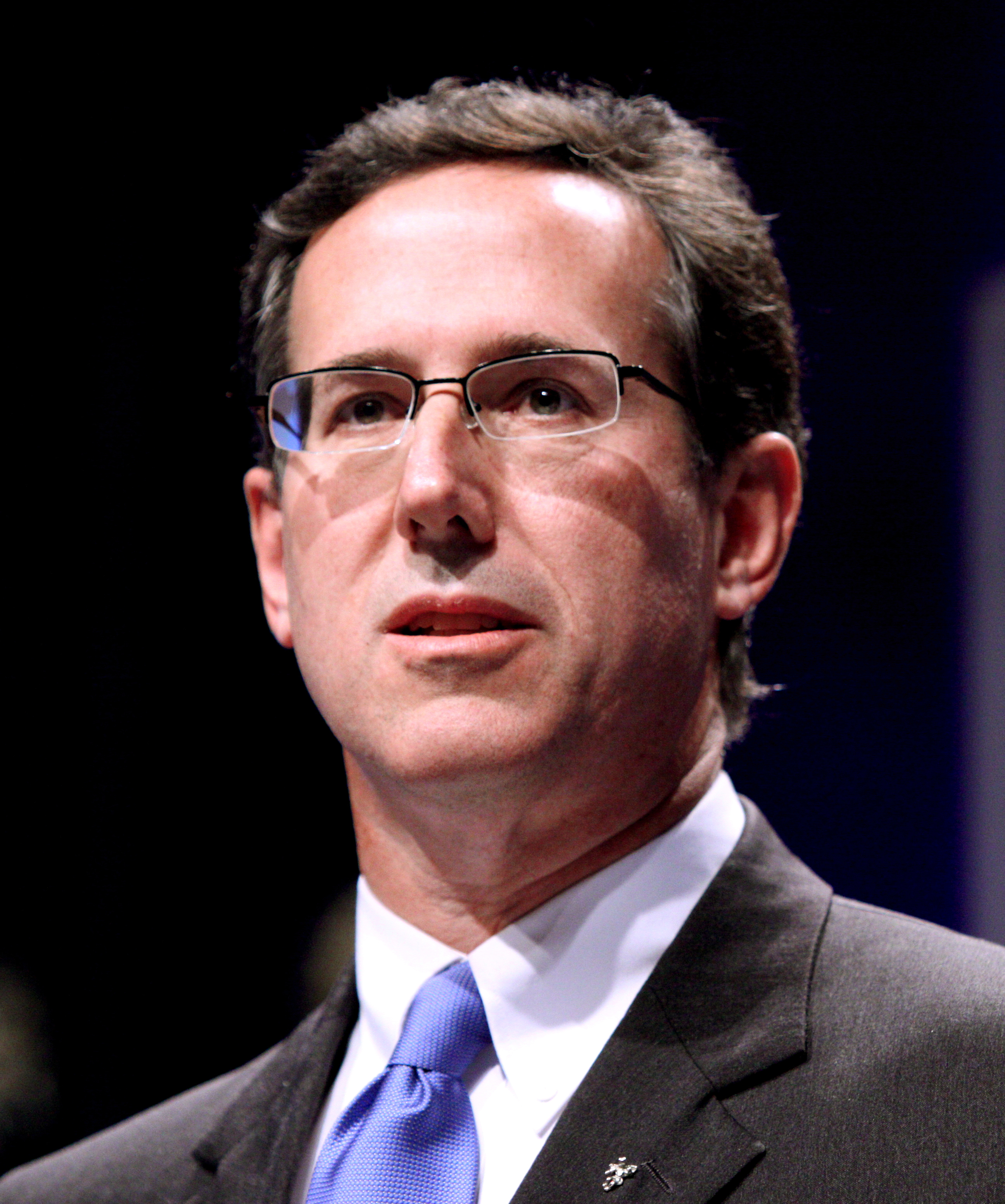

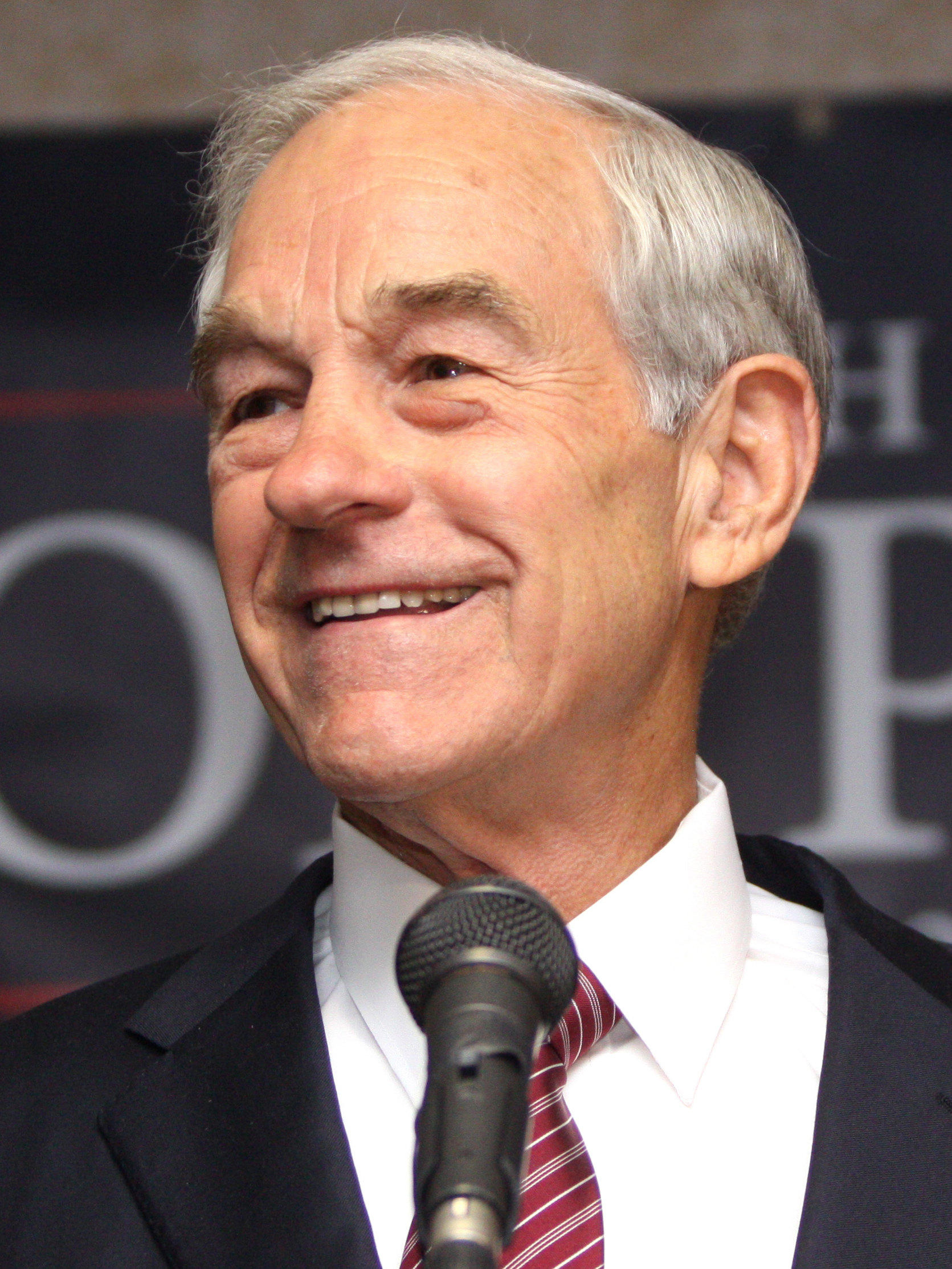
Candidate	Mitt Romney	Rick Santorum	Ron Paul
Home state	Massachusetts	Pennsylvania	Texas
Delegate count	38	0	0
Popular vote	266,313	44,564	35,219
Percentage	71.89%	12.03%	9.51%
Romney
40–50%
50–60%
60–70%
70–80%

The 2012 Massachusetts Republican presidential primary was held on March 6, 2012. Among the 41 delegates to the Republican National Convention, 38 are awarded proportionately among candidates getting at least 15% of the vote statewide, and another three super delegates are unbound. As expected, Romney won Massachusetts by a landslide. He won the plurality in every town but 10 (Rick Santorum won seven, Ron Paul won two, and no candidate won one), and earned the majority in all but 53.

Massachusetts Republican primary, 2012
Candidate	Votes	Percentage	Projected delegate count		
Candidate	Votes	Percentage	AP	CNN	FOX
Mitt Romney	266,313	71.89%	-	38	38
Rick Santorum	44,564	12.03%	-	0	0
Ron Paul	35,219	9.51%	-	0	0
Newt Gingrich	16,991	4.59%	-	0	0
Jon Huntsman (withdrawn)	2,268	0.61%	-	0	0
Rick Perry (withdrawn)	991	0.27%	-	0	0
Michele Bachmann (withdrawn)	865	0.23%	-	0	0
No preference	1,793	0.48%	-	0	0
Blanks	818	0.22%	-	0	0
Others	613	0.17%	-	0	0
Unprojected delegates:			41	3	3
Total:	370,425	100.00%	41	41	41

=== Green-Rainbow primary ===
2012 Massachusetts Green-Rainbow presidential primary
- March 6, 2012
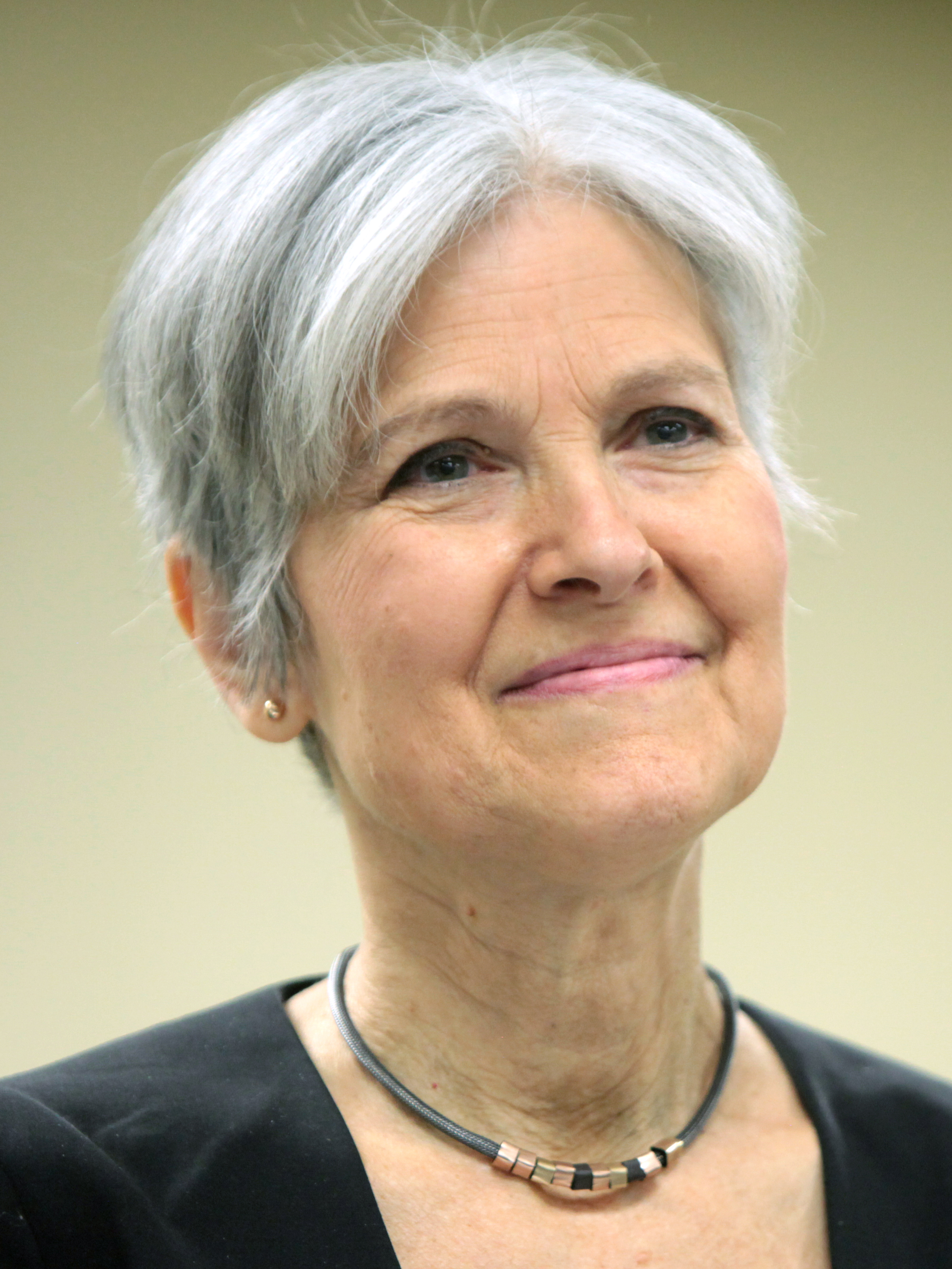

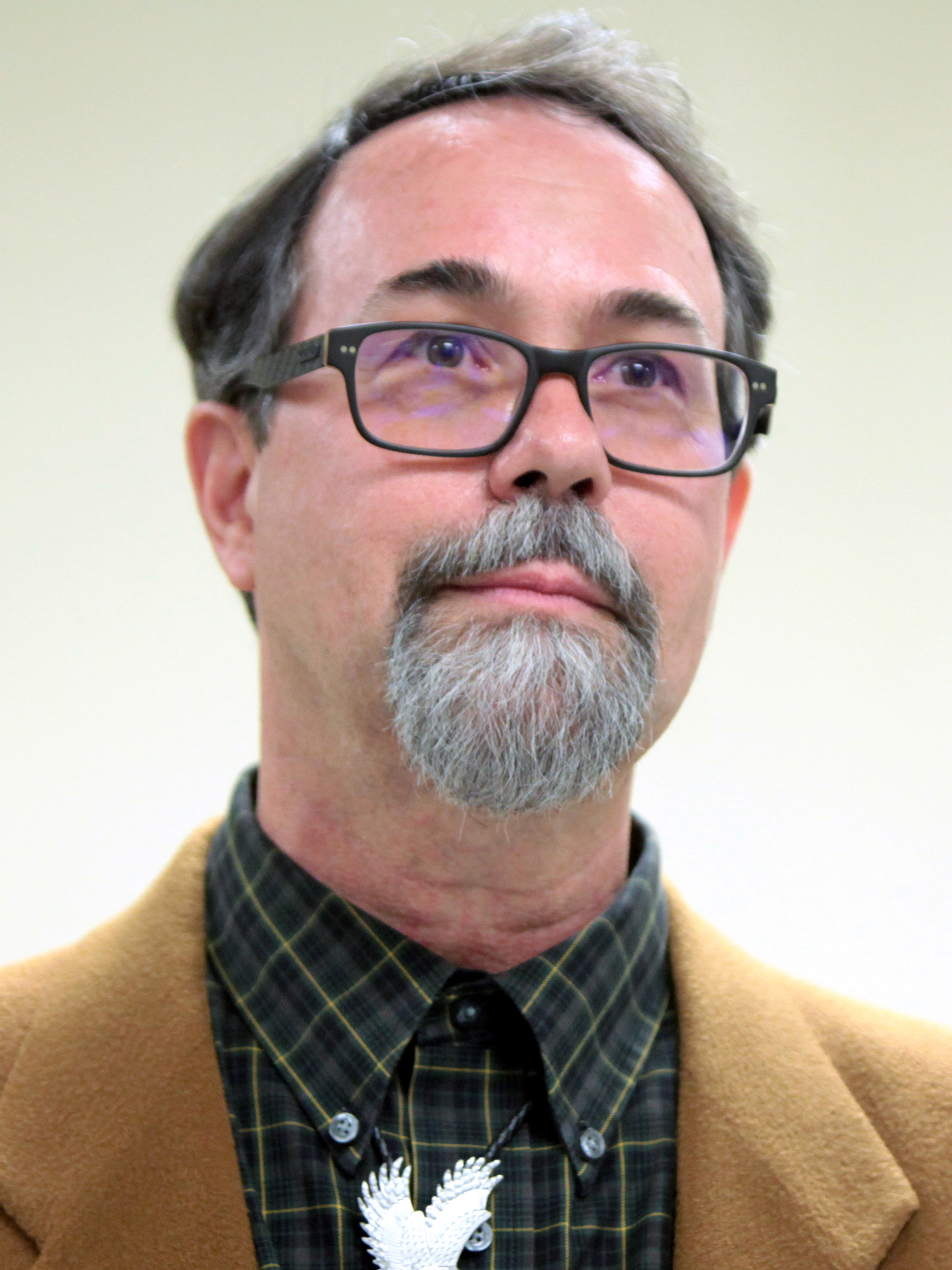

Candidate	Jill Stein	Kent Mesplay	Harley Mikkelson
Party	Green	Green	Green
Home state	Massachusetts	California
Delegate count	8	1	1
Popular vote	1,018	89	84
Percentage	67.06%	5.86%	5.53%

The 2012 Massachusetts Green-Rainbow presidential primary was held on March 6, 2012.

Massachusetts Green-Rainbow primary, 2012
Candidate	Votes	Percentage	Delegates
Jill Stein	1,018	67.06%	8
No preference	232	15.28%	2
Kent Mesplay	89	5.86%	1
Harley Mikkelson	84	5.53%	1
Write-ins	95	6.26%	0
Totals	1,518	100.00%	11

== General election ==
=== Predictions ===
Source	Ranking	As of
Huffington Post	Safe D	November 6, 2012
CNN	Safe D	November 6, 2012
New York Times	Safe D	November 6, 2012
Washington Post	Safe D	November 6, 2012
RealClearPolitics	Solid D	November 6, 2012
Sabato's Crystal Ball	Solid D	November 5, 2012
FiveThirtyEight	Solid D	November 6, 2012

=== Results ===
2012 United States presidential election in Massachusetts
Party	Candidate	Running mate	Votes	Percentage	Electoral votes
Democratic	Barack Obama (incumbent)	Joe Biden (incumbent)	1,921,761	60.67%	11
Republican	Mitt Romney	Paul Ryan	1,188,460	37.52%	0
Libertarian	Gary Johnson	Jim Gray	30,920	0.98%	0
Green-Rainbow	Jill Stein	Cheri Honkala	20,691	0.65%	0
Others	Others		6,552	0.21%	0
Totals			3,167,767	100.00%	11

==== By county ====
County	Barack Obama Democratic		Mitt Romney Republican		Various candidates Other parties		Margin		Total votes cast
County	#	%	#	%	#	%	#	%	Total votes cast
Barnstable	70,822	53.20%	60,446	45.41%	1,847	1.39%	10,376	7.79%	133,115
Berkshire	48,843	75.74%	14,252	22.10%	1,391	2.16%	34,591	53.64%	64,486
Bristol	143,433	59.39%	93,898	38.88%	4,178	1.73%	49,535	20.51%	241,509
Dukes	7,978	72.74%	2,792	25.46%	198	1.80%	5,186	47.28%	10,968
Essex	210,302	57.40%	150,480	41.07%	5,575	1.53%	59,822	16.33%	366,357
Franklin	27,072	71.70%	9,344	24.75%	1,342	3.55%	17,728	46.95%	37,758
Hampden	123,619	61.69%	73,392	36.62%	3,388	1.69%	50,227	25.07%	200,399
Hampshire	57,359	70.27%	21,480	26.32%	2,782	3.41%	35,879	43.95%	81,621
Middlesex	471,804	62.56%	267,321	35.45%	15,045	1.99%	204,483	27.11%	754,170
Nantucket	3,830	62.58%	2,187	35.74%	103	1.68%	1,643	26.84%	6,120
Norfolk	202,714	56.86%	148,393	41.62%	5,416	1.52%	54,321	15.24%	356,523
Plymouth	131,845	51.40%	121,086	47.20%	3,600	1.40%	10,759	4.20%	256,531
Suffolk	223,896	77.45%	59,999	20.75%	5,203	1.80%	163,897	56.70%	289,098
Worcester	198,244	53.71%	163,390	44.27%	7,478	2.02%	34,854	9.44%	369,112
Totals	1,921,761	60.67%	1,188,460	37.52%	57,546	1.82%	733,301	23.15%	3,167,767

==== By municipality ====
Municipality	Barack Obama Democratic		Mitt Romney Republican		Various Candidates Other parties		Total votes cast
Municipality	%	#	%	#	%	#	Total votes cast
Abington	49.8%	4,104	49.1%	4,051	1.1%	89	8,244
Acton	65.7%	7,779	32.5%	3,851	1.8%	218	11,848
Acushnet	57.1%	3,021	41.3%	2,183	1.6%	85	5,289
Adams	77.1%	3,010	20.9%	818	2.0%	77	3,905
Agawam	50.8%	7,288	47.9%	6,870	1.4%	196	14,354
Alford	76.6%	233	21.1%	64	2.3%	7	304
Amesbury	57.4%	4,817	41.0%	3,446	1.6%	133	8,396
Amherst	82.8%	12,316	12.6%	1,872	4.7%	695	14,883
Andover	49.9%	9,287	48.7%	9,053	1.4%	258	18,598
Aquinnah	84.5%	251	12.8%	38	2.7%	8	297
Arlington	72.0%	18,580	25.8%	6,659	2.2%	560	25,799
Ashburnham	50.5%	1,621	47.6%	1,529	1.9%	62	3,212
Ashby	45.2%	827	52.5%	961	2.3%	42	1,830
Ashfield	79.6%	892	16.7%	187	3.7%	42	1,121
Ashland	58.2%	4,954	40.0%	3,407	1.8%	151	8,512
Athol	53.6%	2,525	43.9%	2,070	2.5%	117	4,712
Attleboro	54.2%	10,369	43.9%	8,406	1.8%	353	19,128
Auburn	51.2%	4,495	46.9%	4,116	1.9%	167	8,778
Avon	51.0%	1,221	47.2%	1,131	1.8%	42	2,394
Ayer	55.5%	2,023	42.7%	1,557	1.8%	64	3,644
Barnstable	50.5%	12,842	48.3%	12,290	1.2%	305	25,437
Barre	50.1%	1,343	47.7%	1,279	2.3%	61	2,683
Becket	70.7%	684	26.8%	259	2.5%	24	967
Bedford	58.2%	4,436	39.9%	3,046	1.9%	146	7,628
Belchertown	59.9%	4,542	38.0%	2,886	2.1%	159	7,587
Bellingham	50.0%	4,256	48.4%	4,119	1.6%	140	8,515
Belmont	64.7%	9,108	33.6%	4,728	1.7%	241	14,077
Berkley	47.6%	1,569	51.1%	1,686	1.3%	42	3,297
Berlin	50.9%	917	46.0%	830	3.1%	56	1,803
Bernardston	69.4%	809	28.2%	329	2.4%	28	1,166
Beverly	58.5%	12,075	40.2%	8,304	1.2%	256	20,635
Billerica	48.9%	9,774	49.6%	9,925	1.5%	299	19,998
Blackstone	51.5%	2,221	47.0%	2,027	1.6%	67	4,315
Blandford	45.5%	300	52.7%	348	1.8%	12	660
Bolton	50.5%	1,537	47.8%	1,457	1.7%	52	3,046
Boston	78.9%	196,096	19.4%	48,227	1.7%	4159	248,482
Bourne	46.8%	4,719	52.1%	5,252	1.1%	106	10,077
Boxborough	59.3%	1,737	38.7%	1,134	1.9%	57	2,928
Boxford	39.8%	2,049	59.0%	3,032	1.2%	61	5,142
Boylston	47.9%	1,284	50.1%	1,341	2.0%	53	2,678
Braintree	51.5%	10,015	47.4%	9,217	1.2%	229	19,461
Brewster	56.3%	3,669	42.2%	2,748	1.5%	100	6,517
Bridgewater	48.0%	5,774	50.7%	6,089	1.3%	157	12,020
Brimfield	43.9%	897	53.6%	1,094	2.5%	51	2,042
Brockton	73.7%	25,140	25.4%	8,668	0.9%	310	34,118
Brookfield	47.8%	822	49.6%	853	2.6%	45	1,720
Brookline	77.9%	21,761	20.5%	5,717	1.6%	457	27,935
Buckland	72.5%	750	24.4%	252	3.1%	32	1,034
Burlington	52.3%	6,971	46.5%	6,187	1.2%	160	13,318
Cambridge	86.1%	41,991	10.9%	5,340	3.0%	1456	48,787
Canton	52.2%	6,430	46.7%	5,752	1.1%	137	12,319
Carlisle	58.5%	1,959	39.4%	1,318	2.1%	71	3,348
Carver	47.5%	2,870	51.4%	3,107	1.1%	69	6,046
Charlemont	71.4%	456	26.0%	166	2.7%	17	639
Charlton	43.4%	2,910	54.6%	3,660	2.0%	136	6,706
Chatham	49.6%	2,287	49.4%	2,278	1.1%	49	4,614
Chelmsford	49.4%	9,606	49.0%	9,534	1.6%	319	19,459
Chelsea	80.7%	6,760	18.0%	1,510	1.3%	105	8,375
Cheshire	69.8%	1,216	28.3%	493	1.8%	32	1,741
Chester	50.1%	331	46.1%	305	3.8%	25	661
Chesterfield	63.5%	455	31.8%	228	4.6%	33	716
Chicopee	62.3%	14,292	35.9%	8,237	1.7%	394	22,923
Chilmark	80.5%	585	17.5%	127	2.1%	15	727
Clarksburg	71.5%	613	27.1%	232	1.4%	12	857
Clinton	57.6%	3,492	40.4%	2,451	2.0%	121	6,064
Cohasset	45.8%	2,226	53.4%	2,595	0.9%	42	4,863
Colrain	70.1%	618	26.3%	232	3.5%	31	881
Concord	66.4%	7,282	32.0%	3,509	1.5%	169	10,960
Conway	74.1%	926	23.0%	288	2.9%	36	1,250
Cummington	69.7%	368	26.3%	139	4.0%	21	528
Dalton	71.8%	2,433	26.2%	888	2.0%	67	3,388
Danvers	50.6%	7,344	48.1%	6,984	1.2%	179	14,507
Dartmouth	61.3%	9,817	37.2%	5,964	1.5%	243	16,024
Dedham	56.7%	7,718	42.0%	5,719	1.3%	174	13,611
Deerfield	69.7%	2,103	27.8%	839	2.5%	76	3,018
Dennis	52.9%	4,892	45.9%	4,244	1.2%	109	9,245
Dighton	48.0%	1,743	50.8%	1,842	1.2%	43	3,628
Douglas	42.0%	1,894	56.4%	2,542	1.6%	73	4,509
Dover	42.8%	1,531	56.1%	2,004	1.1%	39	3,574
Dracut	45.6%	6,925	52.9%	8,026	1.5%	224	15,175
Dudley	48.7%	2,466	50.2%	2,544	1.1%	57	5,067
Dunstable	43.4%	819	54.7%	1,034	1.9%	36	1,889
Duxbury	43.9%	3,543	55.2%	4,450	0.9%	72	8,065
East Bridgewater	45.8%	3,340	53.0%	3,867	1.2%	91	7,298
East Brookfield	40.9%	469	57.8%	662	1.3%	15	1,146
Eastham	59.5%	2,187	39.3%	1,446	1.2%	45	3,678
Easthampton	69.8%	6,281	27.4%	2,463	2.9%	258	9,002
East Longmeadow	46.9%	4,085	52.0%	4,523	1.1%	96	8,704
Easton	47.5%	5,690	51.4%	6,162	1.1%	137	11,989
Edgartown	66.3%	1,699	32.3%	827	1.4%	36	2,562
Egremont	80.5%	676	18.0%	151	1.5%	13	840
Erving	72.3%	557	26.0%	200	1.7%	13	770
Essex	53.5%	1,154	44.6%	962	1.9%	42	2,158
Everett	71.6%	9,392	27.3%	3,582	1.0%	136	13,110
Fairhaven	60.8%	5,019	37.3%	3,082	1.9%	154	8,255
Fall River	73.7%	21,724	24.9%	7,323	1.4%	420	29,467
Falmouth	56.8%	11,013	41.9%	8,130	1.3%	261	19,404
Fitchburg	59.2%	8,504	38.8%	5,574	2.0%	286	14,364
Florida	65.3%	254	32.6%	127	2.1%	8	389
Foxborough	49.1%	4,745	49.7%	4,798	1.2%	120	9,663
Framingham	66.2%	18,340	32.3%	8,938	1.5%	426	27,704
Franklin	49.4%	8,589	49.1%	8,549	1.5%	263	17,401
Freetown	49.7%	2,301	48.4%	2,241	1.9%	90	4,632
Gardner	57.2%	4,687	40.6%	3,323	2.2%	182	8,192
Georgetown	46.2%	2,272	52.4%	2,577	1.3%	66	4,915
Gill	72.8%	646	23.9%	212	3.3%	29	887
Gloucester	62.7%	9,680	35.7%	5,511	1.5%	236	15,427
Goshen	64.3%	395	32.2%	198	3.4%	21	614
Gosnold	56.3%	49	41.4%	36	2.3%	2	87
Grafton	51.4%	4,853	46.8%	4,427	1.8%	170	9,450
Granby	53.4%	1,862	45.0%	1,570	1.5%	54	3,486
Granville	42.0%	374	56.4%	502	1.6%	14	890
Great Barrington	81.3%	2,916	16.6%	595	2.1%	76	3,587
Greenfield	74.0%	6,175	22.7%	1,891	3.3%	274	8,340
Groton	52.4%	3,201	45.9%	2,806	1.7%	106	6,113
Groveland	45.9%	1,824	52.4%	2,080	1.7%	66	3,970
Hadley	69.0%	2,119	28.9%	886	2.1%	66	3,071
Halifax	47.3%	1,938	50.6%	2,071	2.1%	85	4,094
Hamilton	48.7%	2,163	49.6%	2,204	1.8%	79	4,446
Hampden	44.3%	1,286	54.0%	1,569	1.7%	50	2,905
Hancock	59.7%	228	37.2%	142	3.1%	12	382
Hanover	40.2%	3,342	59.0%	4,910	0.9%	71	8,323
Hanson	45.1%	2,512	53.9%	2,999	1.0%	57	5,568
Hardwick	54.2%	710	42.7%	559	3.1%	40	1,309
Harvard	60.1%	2,166	37.8%	1,362	2.1%	75	3,603
Harwich	54.0%	4,376	44.5%	3,607	1.4%	116	8,099
Hatfield	66.9%	1,362	31.4%	638	1.7%	35	2,035
Haverhill	55.7%	15,342	42.7%	11,758	1.6%	435	27,535
Hawley	63.6%	126	32.8%	65	3.5%	7	198
Heath	68.5%	292	29.1%	124	2.3%	10	426
Hingham	47.8%	6,750	51.2%	7,231	1.0%	135	14,116
Hinsdale	68.9%	728	28.1%	297	3.0%	32	1,057
Holbrook	55.0%	3,024	43.7%	2,402	1.3%	72	5,498
Holden	48.1%	5,055	50.4%	5,294	1.5%	154	10,503
Holland	44.8%	593	52.1%	690	3.1%	41	1,324
Holliston	55.9%	4,621	42.4%	3,502	1.7%	144	8,267
Holyoke	76.2%	12,492	22.2%	3,639	1.6%	257	16,388
Hopedale	51.7%	1,698	46.5%	1,527	1.7%	57	3,282
Hopkinton	48.5%	4,197	50.1%	4,334	1.4%	123	8,654
Hubbardston	44.6%	1,160	53.1%	1,381	2.3%	59	2,600
Hudson	56.4%	5,642	41.8%	4,183	1.9%	187	10,012
Hull	58.9%	3,576	39.8%	2,417	1.2%	75	6,068
Huntington	50.4%	554	43.6%	479	6.0%	66	1,099
Ipswich	53.2%	4,417	45.1%	3,742	1.6%	136	8,295
Kingston	45.6%	3,176	53.5%	3,724	0.9%	65	6,965
Lakeville	41.7%	2,411	57.1%	3,301	1.2%	72	5,784
Lancaster	46.5%	1,724	51.6%	1,914	1.9%	72	3,710
Lanesborough	71.7%	1,144	26.9%	430	1.4%	22	1,596
Lawrence	83.3%	18,240	15.8%	3,459	0.8%	185	21,884
Lee	73.8%	2,150	24.5%	713	1.7%	49	2,912
Leicester	49.8%	2,744	48.4%	2,667	1.7%	96	5,507
Lenox	76.0%	2,318	22.1%	675	1.8%	56	3,049
Leominster	52.5%	9,769	45.9%	8,540	1.6%	297	18,606
Leverett	80.9%	987	15.0%	183	4.1%	50	1,220
Lexington	69.4%	12,675	29.0%	5,287	1.6%	295	18,257
Leyden	73.4%	339	24.9%	115	1.7%	8	462
Lincoln	69.9%	2,558	28.8%	1,055	1.3%	47	3,660
Littleton	54.2%	2,915	43.8%	2,357	2.0%	110	5,382
Longmeadow	56.3%	4,851	42.5%	3,662	1.2%	101	8,614
Lowell	66.9%	22,597	31.3%	10,586	1.8%	595	33,778
Ludlow	54.1%	5,233	44.4%	4,295	1.5%	143	9,671
Lunenburg	46.6%	2,748	51.5%	3,038	1.8%	109	5,895
Lynn	72.2%	22,965	26.6%	8,463	1.2%	372	31,800
Lynnfield	38.2%	2,773	60.9%	4,419	0.9%	68	7,260
Malden	71.3%	14,940	27.3%	5,714	1.5%	314	20,968
Manchester	54.3%	1,886	44.3%	1,539	1.4%	48	3,473
Mansfield	49.5%	5,910	49.0%	5,855	1.5%	183	11,948
Marblehead	55.2%	6,824	43.9%	5,422	1.0%	118	12,364
Marion	53.5%	1,725	45.1%	1,456	1.4%	45	3,226
Marlborough	57.3%	9,576	41.1%	6,867	1.6%	263	16,706
Marshfield	46.7%	7,041	52.2%	7,866	1.1%	164	15,071
Mashpee	49.9%	4,133	49.0%	4,058	1.1%	89	8,280
Mattapoisett	51.6%	2,041	46.9%	1,855	1.4%	57	3,953
Maynard	62.8%	3,635	35.0%	2,023	2.2%	130	5,788
Medfield	46.5%	3,448	52.1%	3,864	1.4%	103	7,415
Medford	67.9%	18,613	30.3%	8,294	1.8%	494	27,401
Medway	50.0%	3,615	48.7%	3,519	1.4%	98	7,232
Melrose	60.2%	9,289	38.5%	5,936	1.3%	202	15,427
Mendon	44.5%	1,517	54.0%	1,840	1.4%	49	3,406
Merrimac	51.7%	1,844	46.5%	1,657	1.8%	65	3,566
Methuen	51.5%	11,048	47.4%	10,168	1.2%	254	21,470
Middleborough	45.5%	5,192	52.8%	6,029	1.7%	189	11,410
Middlefield	69.4%	202	26.5%	77	4.1%	12	291
Middleton	41.4%	1,909	57.5%	2,651	1.1%	50	4,610
Milford	55.6%	7,129	43.0%	5,504	1.4%	181	12,814
Millbury	50.3%	3,410	48.1%	3,262	1.7%	112	6,784
Millis	51.1%	2,421	47.1%	2,232	1.8%	83	4,736
Millville	46.1%	717	52.2%	813	1.7%	27	1,557
Milton	60.1%	9,499	38.7%	6,122	1.2%	182	15,803
Monroe	60.4%	32	39.6%	21	0.0%	0	53
Monson	50.7%	2,176	47.4%	2,032	1.9%	83	4,291
Montague	76.3%	3,213	20.7%	873	3.0%	126	4,212
Monterey	78.8%	417	18.3%	97	2.8%	15	529
Montgomery	43.4%	220	54.0%	274	2.6%	13	507
Mount Washington	76.9%	83	17.6%	19	5.6%	6	108
Nahant	59.7%	1,371	39.1%	897	1.2%	27	2,295
Nantucket	62.8%	3,828	35.8%	2,185	1.4%	84	6,097
Natick	62.2%	11,600	36.2%	6,757	1.5%	285	18,642
Needham	60.4%	10,207	38.5%	6,513	1.1%	183	16,903
New Ashford	69.9%	107	26.1%	40	3.9%	6	153
New Bedford	75.9%	25,205	22.7%	7,541	1.4%	474	33,220
New Braintree	50.6%	283	46.0%	257	3.4%	19	559
Newbury	51.3%	2,272	47.4%	2,100	1.4%	60	4,432
Newburyport	61.6%	6,784	36.9%	4,059	1.5%	168	11,011
New Marlborough	68.4%	572	28.7%	240	2.9%	24	836
New Salem	62.9%	381	33.8%	205	3.3%	20	606
Newton	71.4%	32,099	27.0%	12,154	1.6%	710	44,963
Norfolk	42.5%	2,424	56.1%	3,199	1.3%	75	5,698
North Adams	77.5%	4,427	20.0%	1,144	2.4%	139	5,710
Northampton	82.4%	13,110	13.7%	2,179	3.9%	626	15,915
North Andover	46.2%	6,991	52.8%	7,992	1.0%	148	15,131
North Attleborough	46.7%	6,602	51.8%	7,331	1.5%	214	14,147
Northborough	52.3%	4,387	46.1%	3,872	1.6%	135	8,394
Northbridge	44.8%	3,408	53.5%	4,072	1.7%	127	7,607
North Brookfield	44.4%	1,050	53.7%	1,271	1.9%	46	2,367
Northfield	68.5%	1,115	29.1%	473	2.4%	39	1,627
North Reading	45.6%	3,986	53.1%	4,641	1.3%	114	8,741
Norton	49.2%	4,454	49.1%	4,449	1.6%	149	9,052
Norwell	42.0%	2,714	57.0%	3,684	1.0%	62	6,460
Norwood	55.5%	8,098	43.1%	6,292	1.4%	206	14,596
Oak Bluffs	70.3%	1,955	28.6%	795	1.1%	31	2,781
Oakham	44.4%	509	53.1%	609	2.4%	28	1,146
Orange	56.2%	1,818	41.0%	1,325	2.8%	92	3,235
Orleans	55.9%	2,496	43.0%	1,922	1.1%	49	4,467
Otis	59.0%	489	37.5%	311	3.5%	29	829
Oxford	48.1%	3,125	50.2%	3,261	1.7%	108	6,494
Palmer	53.6%	3,020	44.0%	2,482	2.4%	134	5,636
Paxton	44.7%	1,119	54.1%	1,354	1.2%	29	2,502
Peabody	55.8%	15,010	43.2%	11,616	1.0%	264	26,890
Pelham	82.1%	728	14.9%	132	3.0%	27	887
Pembroke	46.9%	4,574	52.0%	5,073	1.1%	112	9,759
Pepperell	45.3%	2,936	52.9%	3,426	1.9%	120	6,482
Peru	68.4%	324	28.7%	136	3.0%	14	474
Petersham	55.4%	451	41.5%	338	3.1%	25	814
Phillipston	48.8%	464	49.3%	469	1.9%	18	951
Pittsfield	78.0%	15,600	20.2%	4,044	1.7%	344	19,988
Plainfield	74.3%	286	21.6%	83	4.2%	16	385
Plainville	47.0%	2,068	51.6%	2,269	1.3%	59	4,396
Plymouth	50.8%	15,106	47.9%	14,258	1.3%	372	29,736
Plympton	44.6%	776	53.4%	928	2.0%	34	1,738
Princeton	48.3%	1,112	49.9%	1,148	1.8%	42	2,302
Provincetown	89.1%	2,121	8.8%	210	2.1%	49	2,380
Quincy	61.5%	24,714	36.9%	14,816	1.6%	626	40,156
Randolph	75.6%	11,430	23.5%	3,550	0.9%	133	15,113
Raynham	46.2%	3,217	52.5%	3,657	1.3%	93	6,967
Reading	52.2%	7,447	46.6%	6,640	1.2%	170	14,257
Rehoboth	46.5%	2,912	51.9%	3,246	1.6%	99	6,257
Revere	65.9%	11,141	32.9%	5,560	1.2%	196	16,897
Richmond	74.5%	688	24.5%	226	1.0%	9	923
Rochester	43.6%	1,362	54.5%	1,704	1.9%	59	3,125
Rockland	52.4%	4,526	46.2%	3,989	1.4%	125	8,640
Rockport	62.9%	2,982	35.2%	1,670	1.9%	92	4,744
Rowe	58.1%	140	38.2%	92	3.7%	9	241
Rowley	44.6%	1,596	54.0%	1,935	1.4%	51	3,582
Royalston	57.8%	391	39.5%	267	2.7%	18	676
Russell	49.2%	388	49.0%	386	1.8%	14	788
Rutland	46.3%	2,071	52.1%	2,329	1.6%	71	4,471
Salem	69.1%	13,429	29.0%	5,635	1.9%	371	19,435
Salisbury	53.3%	2,278	45.3%	1,938	1.4%	61	4,277
Sandisfield	64.6%	294	33.8%	154	1.5%	7	455
Sandwich	46.7%	5,802	52.2%	6,492	1.1%	139	12,433
Saugus	50.9%	6,957	48.0%	6,557	1.0%	142	13,656
Savoy	67.9%	241	29.0%	103	3.1%	11	355
Scituate	48.8%	5,528	50.0%	5,659	1.2%	134	11,321
Seekonk	51.9%	3,772	46.5%	3,382	1.6%	115	7,269
Sharon	63.4%	6,558	35.4%	3,659	1.2%	121	10,338
Sheffield	70.5%	1,291	27.5%	503	2.1%	38	1,832
Shelburne	77.0%	873	19.9%	226	3.1%	35	1,134
Sherborn	53.9%	1,430	44.4%	1,179	1.7%	44	2,653
Shirley	49.6%	1,553	47.3%	1,482	3.0%	95	3,130
Shrewsbury	53.6%	9,674	45.2%	8,154	1.3%	226	18,054
Shutesbury	82.2%	1,028	12.5%	156	5.3%	66	1,250
Somerset	61.5%	6,091	37.1%	3,674	1.4%	142	9,907
Somerville	82.2%	28,467	14.1%	4,865	3.7%	1290	34,622
Southampton	53.3%	1,861	45.3%	1,584	1.4%	49	3,494
Southborough	50.6%	2,935	47.9%	2,782	1.5%	87	5,804
Southbridge	64.4%	4,256	34.7%	2,291	0.9%	57	6,604
South Hadley	61.2%	5,362	37.1%	3,252	1.7%	147	8,761
Southwick	41.8%	2,050	56.5%	2,770	1.7%	81	4,901
Spencer	47.3%	2,617	50.4%	2,785	2.3%	128	5,530
Springfield	79.7%	42,963	19.2%	10,372	1.1%	573	53,908
Sterling	42.5%	2,029	55.9%	2,667	1.7%	79	4,775
Stockbridge	78.1%	944	18.7%	226	3.1%	38	1,208
Stoneham	53.6%	6,634	45.1%	5,580	1.2%	154	12,368
Stoughton	58.5%	8,119	40.3%	5,591	1.3%	180	13,890
Stow	55.2%	2,348	43.0%	1,831	1.8%	77	4,256
Sturbridge	47.9%	2,514	49.9%	2,615	2.2%	116	5,245
Sudbury	57.5%	6,026	41.4%	4,341	1.1%	115	10,482
Sunderland	73.2%	1,363	21.7%	404	5.1%	95	1,862
Sutton	40.7%	2,181	57.6%	3,087	1.7%	89	5,357
Swampscott	59.7%	4,899	39.0%	3,202	1.3%	105	8,206
Swansea	57.2%	4,512	41.5%	3,269	1.3%	101	7,882
Taunton	59.6%	13,479	38.8%	8,783	1.6%	358	22,620
Templeton	49.2%	1,857	49.0%	1,851	1.8%	69	3,777
Tewksbury	46.9%	7,540	51.8%	8,332	1.3%	209	16,081
Tisbury	74.2%	1,845	23.9%	595	1.8%	45	2,485
Tolland	39.6%	110	55.8%	155	4.7%	13	278
Topsfield	44.9%	1,800	54.0%	2,164	1.1%	46	4,010
Townsend	42.4%	2,087	55.4%	2,725	2.3%	111	4,923
Truro	71.0%	1,041	27.2%	399	1.8%	27	1,467
Tyngsborough	45.1%	2,837	53.4%	3,361	1.5%	95	6,293
Tyringham	67.1%	173	32.9%	85	0.0%	0	258
Upton	47.3%	1,985	50.8%	2,132	1.9%	79	4,196
Uxbridge	46.3%	3,325	51.9%	3,728	1.8%	128	7,181
Wakefield	51.7%	7,486	47.0%	6,806	1.3%	186	14,478
Wales	51.7%	479	46.8%	434	1.5%	14	927
Walpole	45.5%	6,360	53.3%	7,456	1.2%	168	13,984
Waltham	62.8%	15,748	35.2%	8,816	2.0%	502	25,066
Ware	56.2%	2,390	42.0%	1,783	1.8%	76	4,249
Wareham	55.9%	6,069	42.7%	4,632	1.4%	155	10,856
Warren	52.9%	1,219	43.5%	1,002	3.6%	82	2,303
Warwick	73.7%	334	24.1%	109	2.2%	10	453
Washington	75.9%	239	21.9%	69	2.2%	7	315
Watertown	71.1%	11,878	27.0%	4,516	1.9%	322	16,716
Wayland	62.4%	5,153	36.0%	2,975	1.6%	132	8,260
Webster	51.8%	3,476	46.4%	3,111	1.8%	119	6,706
Wellesley	56.7%	8,243	42.2%	6,144	1.1%	162	14,549
Wellfleet	69.9%	1,568	27.6%	619	2.5%	55	2,242
Wendell	76.6%	425	12.6%	70	10.8%	60	555
Wenham	44.8%	1,058	53.6%	1,265	1.5%	36	2,359
Westborough	55.8%	4,999	42.6%	3,818	1.5%	135	8,952
West Boylston	48.7%	2,029	50.0%	2,083	1.3%	55	4,167
West Bridgewater	43.8%	1,734	54.8%	2,169	1.3%	52	3,955
West Brookfield	49.5%	964	48.8%	950	1.6%	32	1,946
Westfield	52.0%	9,228	46.1%	8,178	1.9%	329	17,735
Westford	49.5%	6,385	48.8%	6,295	1.7%	216	12,896
Westhampton	60.4%	639	36.4%	385	3.2%	34	1,058
Westminster	45.4%	1,940	52.5%	2,245	2.1%	91	4,276
West Newbury	50.0%	1,383	48.7%	1,347	1.3%	37	2,767
Weston	51.2%	3,390	47.7%	3,159	1.1%	72	6,621
Westport	59.1%	5,074	39.3%	3,372	1.6%	141	8,587
West Springfield	53.6%	6,170	44.9%	5,169	1.5%	176	11,515
West Stockbridge	79.8%	707	18.2%	161	2.0%	18	886
West Tisbury	79.5%	1,571	18.8%	371	1.7%	33	1,975
Westwood	48.2%	4,337	50.6%	4,549	1.2%	106	8,992
Weymouth	54.4%	15,130	44.3%	12,341	1.3%	361	27,832
Whately	65.2%	626	31.4%	301	3.4%	33	960
Whitman	49.2%	3,654	49.2%	3,652	1.6%	117	7,423
Wilbraham	45.6%	3,745	52.8%	4,332	1.6%	128	8,205
Williamsburg	76.4%	1,239	20.0%	324	3.6%	59	1,622
Williamstown	80.9%	3,012	17.2%	640	1.9%	71	3,723
Wilmington	47.2%	5,890	51.5%	6,437	1.3%	162	12,489
Winchendon	51.5%	2,142	46.5%	1,933	2.0%	85	4,160
Winchester	54.8%	7,000	43.9%	5,602	1.3%	165	12,767
Windsor	73.8%	385	24.3%	127	1.9%	10	522
Winthrop	58.6%	5,211	40.2%	3,575	1.2%	109	8,895
Woburn	53.5%	10,291	45.2%	8,707	1.3%	245	19,243
Worcester	69.0%	40,568	29.2%	17,155	1.8%	1033	58,756
Worthington	66.5%	481	28.8%	208	4.7%	34	723
Wrentham	42.7%	2,704	55.9%	3,535	1.4%	89	6,328
Yarmouth	51.8%	7,183	47.0%	6,526	1.2%	163	13,872

==== By congressional district ====
Obama won all nine congressional districts.

District	Obama	Romney	Representative
1st	63.96%	34.27%	Richard Neal
2nd	58.70%	39.18%	Jim McGovern
3rd	56.91%	41.41%	Niki Tsongas
4th	57.24%	41.29%	Joseph Kennedy III
5th	65.19%	33.13%	Ed Markey
6th	54.74%	43.89%	John F. Tierney
7th	82.46%	15.64%	Mike Capuano
8th	57.78%	40.85%	Stephen Lynch
9th	55.54%	43.14%	William R. Keating

== See also ==
- United States presidential elections in Massachusetts
- 2012 Republican Party presidential debates and forums
- 2012 Republican Party presidential primaries
- Results of the 2012 Republican Party presidential primaries
- Massachusetts Republican Party
