= 1918 Massachusetts Question 1 =

Referendum creating initiative and referendum process

- November 5, 1918
- Shall the Article of Amendment relative to the establishment of the popular initiative and referendum and the legislative initiative of specific amendments of the Constitution, submitted by the Constitutional Convention, be approved and ratified?

Results
Choice	Votes	%
Yes	170,646	51.28%
No	162,103	48.72%

Yes
70–80%
60–70%
50–60%
No
90–100%
80–90%
70–80%
60–70%
50–60%
Tie

1918 Massachusetts Question 1 was a proposed amendment to the Constitution of Massachusetts to establish an initiative and referendum process in the state. Referred to the ballot by a constitutional convention, the measure was narrowly agreed to by voters. 51.28% cast a vote in favor, though only 2 of the state's 14 counties had a majority in support.

== Background ==
Before being proposed in Massachusetts, 21 U.S. states had already adopted the initiative and referendum process.

At the time, out of the most recent eight gubernatorial elections in the Commonwealth, five of those who were elected governor advocated in their campaign for the process. All gubernatorial candidates in the 1914 election, including both those who won and lost, were supporters. And, three out of the last five speakers of Massachusetts House of Representatives backed the issue.

At the constitutional convention, the amendment passed "by a decisive non-partisan vote," which occurred "after one of the longest debates in American political history". However, before advocates sought to have a constitutional convention, they attempted to receive the necessary two-thirds majority vote in two successive legislative sessions needed for an amendment to pass out of the state House. But, over the course of twelve votes, the amendment only received the necessary two-thirds vote one time, in 1903.

Vote in the Massachusetts House
Date	Yeas	Nays
March 14, 1901	69	74
May 1, 1902	111	64
May 5, 1903	155	22
April 7, 1904	107	102
April 12, 1905	89	78
March 18, 1908	88	114
March 29, 1910	91	78
April 21, 1910	112	102
June 27, 1911	125	75
April 1, 1912	132	73
May 12, 1913	142	73
1914	141	85

== Contents ==
On the ballot, voters were asked:

Shall the Article of Amendment relative to the establishment of the popular initiative and referendum and the legislative initiative of specific amendments of the Constitution, submitted by the Constitutional Convention, be approved and ratified?

== Results ==
=== By county ===
The following table details the results by county:

County	Yes		No	
County	#	%	#	%
Barnstable	822	27.96	2,118	72.04
Berkshire	4,350	38.19	7,039	61.81
Bristol	12,061	47.00	13,603	53.00
Dukes	119	33.06	241	66.94
Essex	22,242	49.23	22,934	50.77
Franklin	1,418	30.97	3,161	69.03
Hampden	9,872	44.39	12,366	55.61
Hampshire	2,099	33.15	4,232	66.85
Middlesex	36,142	49.40	37,025	50.60
Nantucket	64	25.20	190	74.80
Norfolk	10,244	46.42	11,825	53.58
Plymouth	8,198	53.42	7,148	46.58
Suffolk	44,285	70.07	18,914	29.93
Worcester	18,728	46.78	21,306	53.22
State total	170,646 (Note: Two individuals voted absentee, making the total number of yes votes go from 170,644 to 170,646.)	51.28	162,103 (Note: One individual voted absentee, making the total number of no votes go from 162,102 to 162,103.)	48.72

=== By municipality ===
The following collapsed tables detail the results by municipality, such as town or city:

Barnstable County
Municipality	Yes		No	
Municipality	#	%	#	%
Barnstable	222	33.79	435	66.21
Bourne	84	29.07	205	70.93
Brewster	30	41.10	43	58.90
Chatham	38	20.11	151	79.89
Dennis	35	22.88	118	77.12
Eastham	14	28.00	36	72.00
Falmouth	103	27.84	267	72.16
Harwich	42	23.46	137	76.54
Mashpee	4	16.67	20	83.33
Orleans	44	29.14	107	70.86
Provincetown	59	21.85	211	78.15
Sandwich	82	43.85	105	56.15
Truro	12	23.08	40	76.92
Wellfleet	23	23.00	77	77.00
Yarmouth	30	15.31	166	84.69
Total	822	27.96	2,118	72.04

Berkshire County
Municipality	Yes		No	
Municipality	#	%	#	%
Adams	688	54.78	568	45.22
Alford	3	10.71	25	89.29
Becket	37	42.05	51	57.95
Cheshire	60	38.46	96	61.54
Clarksburg	33	33.33	66	66.67
Dalton	181	37.95	296	62.05
Egremont	3	4.48	64	95.52
Florida	4	20.00	16	80.00
Great Barrington	205	35.22	377	64.78
Hancock	4	7.27	51	92.73
Hinsdale	38	35.85	68	64.15
Lanesborough	34	37.36	57	62.64
Lee	92	21.85	329	78.15
Lenox	103	32.29	216	67.71
Monterey	2	5.26	36	94.74
Mount Washington	3	23.08	10	76.92
New Ashford	0	0.00	11	100.00
New Marlborough	27	48.21	29	51.79
North Adams	857	39.93	1,289	60.07
Otis	3	7.50	37	92.50
Peru	6	33.33	12	66.67
Pittsfield	1,718	40.58	2,516	59.42
Richmond	10	16.13	52	83.87
Sandisfield	10	33.33	20	66.67
Savoy	14	35.90	25	64.10
Sheffield	31	19.38	129	80.63
Stockbridge	73	35.10	135	64.90
Tyringham	4	11.76	30	88.24
Washington	4	17.39	19	82.61
West Stockbridge	30	32.97	61	67.03
Williamstown	71	18.68	309	81.32
Windsor	2	4.88	39	95.12
Total	4,350	38.19	7,039	61.81

Bristol County
Municipality	Yes		No	
Municipality	#	%	#	%
Acushnet	37	32.46	77	67.54
Attleboro	1,073	61.95	659	38.05
Berkley	30	35.71	54	64.29
Dartmouth	67	28.03	172	71.97
Dighton	54	29.83	127	70.17
Easton	252	47.19	282	52.81
Fairhaven	136	25.76	392	74.24
Fall River	4,301	49.87	4,324	50.13
Freetown	10	7.87	117	92.13
Mansfield	286	51.62	268	48.38
New Bedford	3,402	46.14	3,971	53.86
North Attleborough	605	57.89	440	42.11
Norton	83	41.50	117	58.50
Raynham	28	21.21	104	78.79
Rehoboth	33	30.00	77	70.00
Seekonk	63	43.15	83	56.85
Somerset	84	28.00	216	72.00
Swansea	31	17.22	149	82.78
Taunton	1,440	44.87	1,769	55.13
Westport	46	18.33	205	81.67
Total	12,061	47.00	13,603	53.00

Dukes County
Municipality	Yes		No	
Municipality	#	%	#	%
Chilmark	6	25.00	18	75.00
Edgartown	20	18.02	91	81.98
Gay Head	4	57.14	3	42.86
Gosnold	2	11.11	16	88.89
Oak Bluffs	35	43.21	46	56.79
Tisbury	46	58.23	33	41.77
West Tisbury	6	15.00	34	85.00
Total	119	33.06	241	66.94

Essex County
Municipality	Yes		No	
Municipality	#	%	#	%
Amesbury	410	40.67	598	59.33
Andover	435	44.94	533	55.06
Beverly	1,238	48.80	1,299	51.20
Boxford	20	21.74	72	78.26
Danvers	459	37.93	751	62.07
Essex	79	40.10	118	59.90
Georgetown	84	34.15	162	65.85
Gloucester	1,016	49.93	1,019	50.07
Groveland	160	59.26	110	40.74
Hamilton	64	38.79	101	61.21
Haverhill	2,052	47.81	2,240	52.19
Ipswich	120	25.75	346	74.25
Lawrence	4,161	60.27	2,743	39.73
Lynn	5,308	56.23	4,131	43.77
Lynnfield	74	41.57	104	58.43
Manchester	105	30.35	241	69.65
Marblehead	429	42.77	574	57.23
Merrimac	92	35.80	165	64.20
Methuen	748	52.79	669	47.21
Middleton	48	31.17	106	68.83
Nahant	103	45.78	122	54.22
Newbury	46	21.50	168	78.50
Newburyport	701	42.38	953	57.62
North Andover	362	46.00	425	54.00
Peabody	888	51.18	847	48.82
Rockport	177	43.70	228	56.30
Rowley	48	29.81	113	70.19
Salem	1,826	43.96	2,328	56.04
Salisbury	61	31.61	132	68.39
Saugus	479	47.33	533	52.67
Swampscott	331	33.81	648	66.19
Topsfield	30	20.55	116	79.45
Wenham	39	24.84	118	75.16
West Newbury	49	28.82	121	71.18
Total	22,242	49.23	22,934	50.77

Franklin County
Municipality	Yes		No	
Municipality	#	%	#	%
Ashfield	14	15.56	76	84.44
Bernardston	4	4.44	86	95.56
Buckland	32	18.82	138	81.18
Charlemont	5	5.56	85	94.44
Colrain	14	9.21	138	90.79
Conway	17	16.19	88	83.81
Deerfield	42	21.21	156	78.79
Erving	31	33.70	61	66.30
Gill	13	16.05	68	83.95
Greenfield	563	41.73	786	58.27
Hawley	2	6.67	28	93.33
Heath	3	6.67	42	93.33
Leverett	8	15.09	45	84.91
Leyden	0	0.00	36	100.00
Monroe	0	0.00	13	100.00
Montague	323	50.71	314	49.29
New Salem	35	66.04	18	33.96
Northfield	29	18.35	129	81.65
Orange	203	30.71	458	69.29
Rowe	6	15.38	33	84.62
Shelburne	27	14.44	160	85.56
Shutesbury	3	16.67	15	83.33
Sunderland	17	17.17	82	82.83
Warwick	10	23.81	32	76.19
Wendell	10	41.67	14	58.33
Whately	7	10.45	60	89.55
Total	1,418	30.97	3,161	69.03

Hampden County
Municipality	Yes		No	
Municipality	#	%	#	%
Agawam	95	28.79	235	71.21
Blandford	11	22.00	39	78.00
Brimfield	30	35.71	54	64.29
Chester	38	43.68	49	56.32
Chicopee	932	44.59	1,158	55.41
East Longmeadow	58	36.02	103	63.98
Granville	9	13.24	59	86.76
Hampden	18	35.29	33	64.71
Holland	2	9.52	19	90.48
Holyoke	2,685	55.90	2,118	44.10
Longmeadow	63	23.51	205	76.49
Ludlow	134	44.52	167	55.48
Monson	145	35.37	265	64.63
Montgomery	1	5.26	18	94.74
Palmer	326	42.78	436	57.22
Russell	28	28.57	70	71.43
Southwick	23	19.83	93	80.17
Springfield	4,198	42.66	5,642	57.34
Tolland	3	23.08	10	76.92
Wales	8	19.51	33	80.49
West Springfield	466	47.02	525	52.98
Westfield	574	37.96	938	62.04
Wilbraham	25	20.49	97	79.51
Total	9,872	44.39	12,366	55.61

Hampshire County
Municipality	Yes		No	
Municipality	#	%	#	%
Amherst	192	28.40	484	71.60
Belchertown	41	24.12	129	75.88
Chesterfield	12	15.58	65	84.42
Cummington	7	9.46	67	90.54
Easthampton	212	26.53	587	73.47
Enfield	11	11.46	85	88.54
Goshen	3	9.38	29	90.63
Granby	17	25.76	49	74.24
Greenwich	6	11.32	47	88.68
Hadley	28	15.64	151	84.36
Hatfield	22	17.60	103	82.40
Huntington	61	40.67	89	59.33
Middlefield	2	7.69	24	92.31
Northampton	752	36.49	1,309	63.51
Pelham	17	26.98	46	73.02
Plainfield	4	9.52	38	90.48
Prescott	4	12.50	28	87.50
South Hadley	209	42.83	279	57.17
Southampton	19	23.46	62	76.54
Ware	388	55.83	307	44.17
Westhampton	7	17.07	34	82.93
Williamsburg	78	31.97	166	68.03
Worthington	7	11.48	54	88.52
Total	2,099	33.15	4,232	66.85

Middlesex County
County	Yes		No	
County	#	%	#	%
Acton	65	23.47	212	76.53
Arlington	971	45.06	1,184	54.94
Ashby	34	37.78	56	62.22
Ashland	115	45.45	138	54.55
Ayer	173	55.81	137	44.19
Bedford	60	36.36	105	63.64
Belmont	463	43.27	607	56.73
Billerica	189	52.94	168	47.06
Boxborough	5	12.82	34	87.18
Burlington	16	18.60	70	81.40
Cambridge	4,795	57.43	3,554	42.57
Carlisle	19	36.54	33	63.46
Chelmsford	218	42.83	291	57.17
Concord	264	45.60	315	54.40
Dracut	122	33.89	238	66.11
Dunstable	3	6.67	42	93.33
Everett	1,971	57.68	1,446	42.32
Framingham	898	49.45	918	50.55
Groton	93	32.18	196	67.82
Holliston	158	44.76	195	55.24
Hopkinton	180	52.17	165	47.83
Hudson	392	51.65	367	48.35
Lexington	222	30.79	499	69.21
Lincoln	38	26.57	105	73.43
Littleton	39	26.53	108	73.47
Lowell	4,562	52.14	4,187	47.86
Malden	2,796	61.53	1,748	38.47
Marlborough	1,127	61.28	712	38.72
Maynard	316	54.86	260	45.14
Medford	1,990	50.61	1,942	49.39
Melrose	1,071	46.65	1,225	53.35
Natick	771	53.54	669	46.46
Newton	1,881	36.74	3,239	63.26
North Reading	36	27.27	96	72.73
Pepperell	89	29.67	211	70.33
Reading	328	34.78	615	65.22
Sherborn	46	30.46	105	69.54
Shirley	57	38.26	92	61.74
Somerville	4,203	51.52	3,955	48.48
Stoneham	465	51.61	436	48.39
Stow	25	26.04	71	73.96
Sudbury	52	38.81	82	61.19
Tewksbury	57	29.84	134	70.16
Townsend	55	27.64	144	72.36
Tyngsborough	23	23.47	75	76.53
Wakefield	669	45.08	815	54.92
Waltham	1,312	43.95	1,673	56.05
Watertown	955	49.61	970	50.39
Wayland	143	49.65	145	50.35
Westford	73	28.74	181	71.26
Weston	57	22.71	194	77.29
Wilmington	65	25.79	187	74.21
Winchester	444	33.79	870	66.21
Woburn	976	54.68	809	45.32
Total	36,142	49.40	37,025	50.60

Nantucket County
Municipality	Yes		No	
Municipality	#	%	#	%
Nantucket	64	25.20	190	74.80
Total	64	25.20	190	74.80

Norfolk County
Municipality	Yes		No	
Municipality	#	%	#	%
Avon	170	65.64	89	34.36
Bellingham	80	61.54	50	38.46
Braintree	469	45.10	571	54.90
Brookline	1,285	33.46	2,555	66.54
Canton	260	42.90	346	57.10
Cohasset	116	33.72	228	66.28
Dedham	674	53.24	592	46.76
Dover	22	22.68	75	77.32
Foxborough	151	34.40	288	65.60
Franklin	260	44.60	323	55.40
Holbrook	201	56.78	153	43.22
Medfield	58	26.36	162	73.64
Medway	115	37.70	190	62.30
Millis	100	50.00	100	50.00
Milton	444	36.30	779	63.70
Needham	321	39.29	496	60.71
Norfolk	52	39.69	79	60.31
Norwood	601	53.66	519	46.34
Plainville	71	38.80	112	61.20
Quincy	2,312	57.84	1,685	42.16
Randolph	338	62.83	200	37.17
Sharon	170	49.56	173	50.44
Stoughton	466	57.04	351	42.96
Walpole	264	50.97	254	49.03
Wellesley	211	30.40	483	69.60
Westwood	69	41.07	99	58.93
Weymouth	890	54.20	752	45.80
Wrentham	74	37.95	121	62.05
Total	10,244	46.42	11,825	53.58

Plymouth County
Municipality	Yes		No	
Municipality	#	%	#	%
Abington	360	53.89	308	46.11
Bridgewater	250	45.05	305	54.95
Brockton	4,031	61.47	2,527	38.53
Carver	25	43.10	33	56.90
Duxbury	70	38.04	114	61.96
East Bridgewater	192	50.53	188	49.47
Halifax	13	30.23	30	69.77
Hanover	104	46.22	121	53.78
Hanson	73	43.98	93	56.02
Hingham	279	41.89	387	58.11
Hull	73	38.62	116	61.38
Kingston	70	38.67	111	61.33
Lakeville	36	40.45	53	59.55
Marion	14	14.89	80	85.11
Marshfield	25	12.32	178	87.68
Mattapoisett	25	21.74	90	78.26
Middleborough	365	44.46	456	55.54
Norwell	58	45.31	70	54.69
Pembroke	44	44.44	55	55.56
Plymouth	483	46.76	550	53.24
Plympton	13	22.81	44	77.19
Rochester	15	18.75	65	81.25
Rockland	543	59.74	366	40.26
Scituate	99	35.61	179	64.39
Wareham	194	56.23	151	43.77
West Bridgewater	146	49.66	148	50.34
Whitman	598	64.44	330	35.56
Total	8,198	53.42	7,148	46.58

Suffolk County
Municipality	Yes		No	
Municipality	#	%	#	%
Boston	40,633	71.42	16,257	28.58
Chelsea	1,522	57.37	1,131	42.63
Revere	1,542	70.57	643	29.43
Winthrop	588	39.97	883	60.03
Total	44,285	70.07	18,914	29.93

Worcester County
Municipality	Yes		No	
Municipality	#	%	#	%
Ashburnham	53	25.24	157	74.76
Athol	376	40.34	556	59.66
Auburn	143	38.96	224	61.04
Barre	99	39.76	150	60.24
Berlin	26	21.67	94	78.33
Blackstone	220	68.32	102	31.68
Bolton	23	22.12	81	77.88
Boylston	25	27.17	67	72.83
Brookfield	67	30.88	150	69.12
Charlton	46	28.22	117	71.78
Clinton	796	57.81	581	42.19
Dana	13	19.12	55	80.88
Douglas	53	34.87	99	65.13
Dudley	113	45.38	136	54.62
Fitchburg	1,822	51.34	1,727	48.66
Gardner	774	55.68	616	44.32
Grafton	175	36.53	304	63.47
Hardwick	73	35.44	133	64.56
Harvard	21	15.00	119	85.00
Holden	62	22.38	215	77.62
Hopedale	132	39.40	203	60.60
Hubbardston	31	26.05	88	73.95
Lancaster	55	29.10	134	70.90
Leicester	178	44.50	222	55.50
Leominster	811	46.53	932	53.47
Lunenburg	38	25.00	114	75.00
Mendon	40	36.70	69	63.30
Milford	879	68.73	400	31.27
Millbury	168	39.62	256	60.38
Millville	175	77.78	50	22.22
New Braintree	5	10.00	45	90.00
North Brookfield	114	49.35	117	50.65
Northborough	70	28.46	176	71.54
Northbridge	318	40.72	463	59.28
Oakham	15	27.78	39	72.22
Oxford	116	34.63	219	65.37
Paxton	10	23.26	33	76.74
Petersham	20	21.74	72	78.26
Phillipston	8	19.51	33	80.49
Princeton	7	8.54	75	91.46
Royalston	15	19.23	63	80.77
Rutland	41	31.30	90	68.70
Shrewsbury	73	27.44	193	72.56
Southborough	100	42.92	133	57.08
Southbridge	498	47.03	561	52.97
Spencer	211	30.89	472	69.11
Sterling	46	25.41	135	74.59
Sturbridge	31	18.56	136	81.44
Sutton	46	27.71	120	72.29
Templeton	89	27.81	231	72.19
Upton	68	31.05	151	68.95
Uxbridge	206	44.21	260	55.79
Warren	149	46.13	174	53.87
Webster	638	63.48	367	36.52
West Boylston	30	23.81	96	76.19
West Brookfield	40	28.57	100	71.43
Westborough	301	55.84	238	44.16
Westminster	41	30.60	93	69.40
Winchendon	215	38.46	344	61.54
Worcester	7,720	49.34	7,926	50.66
Total	18,728	46.78	21,306	53.22

== Effect ==
Among other things, the amendment added the following text to the Constitution of Massachusetts:

Legislative power shall continue to be vested in the general court; but the people reserve to themselves the popular initiative, which is the power of a specified number of voters to submit constitutional amendments and laws to the people for approval or rejection; and the popular referendum, which is the power of a specified number of voters to submit laws, enacted by the general court, to the people for their ratification or rejection.

— Excerpt of Article 48, Constitution of Massachusetts
