= Gateway Regional High School (Massachusetts) =

Coordinates: 42°15′28.14″N 72°52′33.53″W

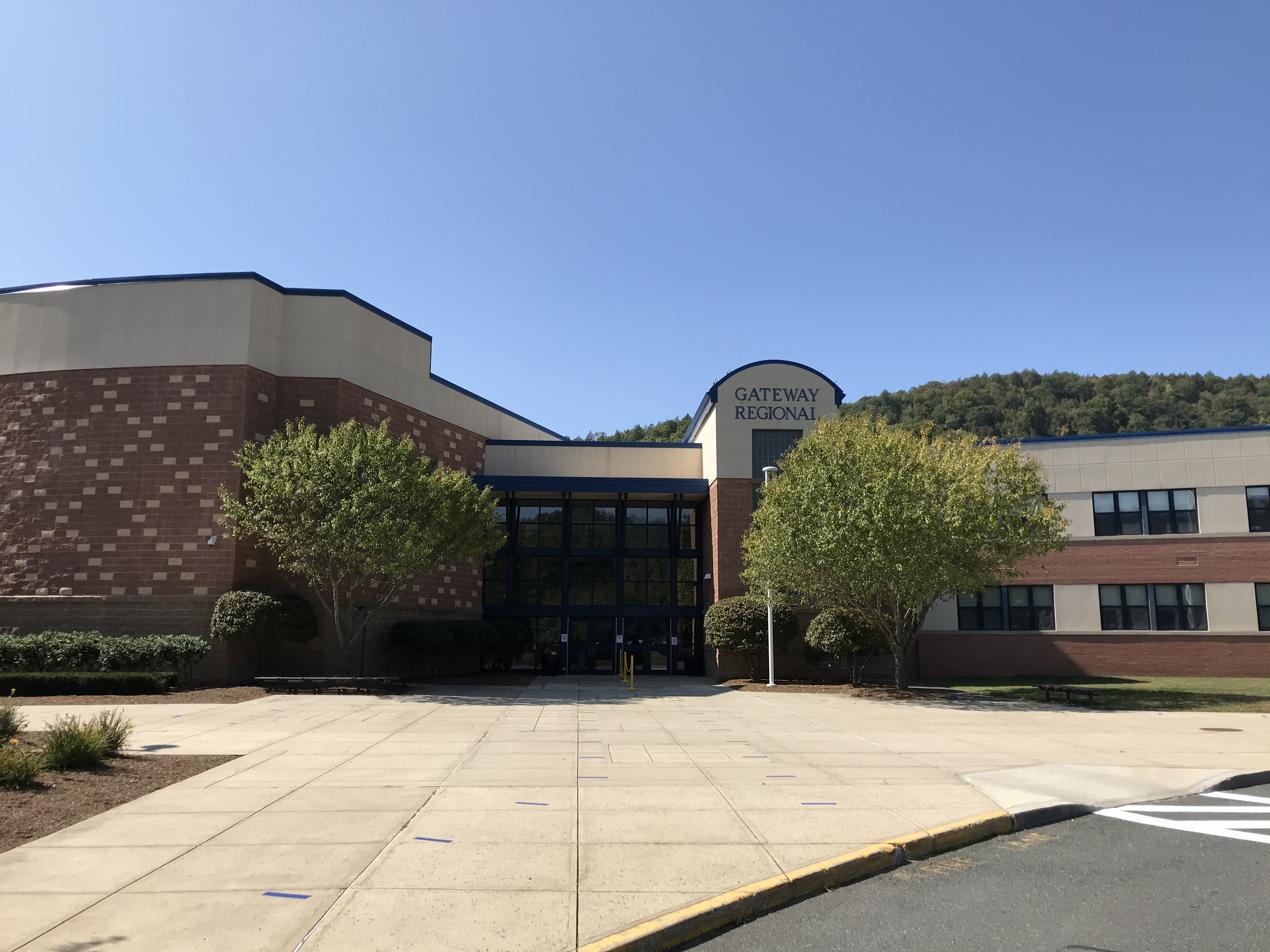
- Gateway Regional High School in 2020

Location
- 12 Littleville Road; Huntington, MA 01050; United States

Information
- Type: Public high school Open enrollment
- Opened: Wednesday, September 4, 1963
- School district: Gateway Regional School District
- Superintendent: Kristen Smidy (from August 2021)
- Principal: Jason S. Finnie
- Staff: 40
- Teaching staff: 43.08 (FTE)
- Grades: 9-12
- Enrollment: 333 (2024-2025)
- Student to teacher ratio: 7.73
- Colors: Blue and yellow
- Mascot: The Gateway Gator
- Accreditation: NEASC
- Newspaper: The Gateway Post
- Yearbook: The Portal
- Communities served: Blandford, Chester, Dunwich, Huntington, Middlefield, Montgomery, Russell, Westfield
- Website: grhs.grsd.org

Gateway Regional High School (GRHS), commonly referred to as "Gateway" or "Gateway Regional," is a public high school located in Huntington, Massachusetts, United States. It is the only high school in the Gateway Regional School District, serving students from Blandford, Chester, Huntington, Middlefield, Montgomery, Russell and Westfield.

== History ==
It is said that before the abolition of slavery, a branch of the Underground Railroad, which was developed to assist fugitive slaves in their escape to Canada, ran through Huntington (then Murrayfield). Millers' Tavern operated as a "station," and, being the last "hiding place" en route, became known as "The Gateway."

Today, the High School, Junior High School, Middle School, and Littleville Elementary stand on the old Moore farm property, the house and barns of which once served as Millers' Tavern and Stage Coach Inn. Therefore, it was natural to take the suggestion for a name for the school and district from the history and heritage of the past, so this parcel of land could continue to be a gateway to a better future.

== Extracurricular activities ==
=== Model United Nations ===
Founded in the Fall of 2013, Gateway Regional High School-Model United Nations (GRHS—MUN) is advised by History Department teacher Nicholas Vooys. The club attends several Model UN conferences each year, including Boston College's EagleMUNC. The club's constitution, ratified on November 6, 2013, was amended on June 4, 2014. This revision was significant as it included an overhaul of the club's executive structure and powers.

The Model United Nations club hosts two MUN conferences each year. noviceMUN, which is intended for beginner delegates, is held each Fall and GRMUNC, which is the club's flagship conference, is held each spring. noviceMUN, followed by GRMUNC, was the first Model UN conference in Western Massachusetts to be hosted by a high school.

=== As Schools Match Wits ===
The As Schools Match Wits team (ASMW) practices trivia questions after school in preparation for competition in As Schools Match Wits, a high school quiz show that airs on WGBY.

=== Gateway Education, News and Entertainment System (Genesys) ===
Genesys produces periodic news videos which are posted on YouTube. All of the broadcasters are students, as are all of the crew. Genesys also appears at most school events, filming and archiving all of their footage.

=== Thespian Club ===
Gateway's Thespian Club produces one play every academic year. The play is held in the spring and past performances have included Shakespeare's Much Ado About Nothing, among other plays.

=== Red Cross Club ===
The Red Cross Club, formed in 2014, partakes in volunteer service.

=== Student Government ===
The Student Council at Gateway consists of twenty Student Representatives, five from each grade. The Student Council holds annual elections.

== Athletics ==
Gateway's teams are known as the Gateway Gators; their colors are blue and gold. The school is especially well known for its soccer teams (both the boys' and girls' teams), though also excels at other sports, including baseball.

Sports offered include:

- Fall
  - Boys' Soccer (JV, Varsity)
  - Girls' Soccer (JV, Varsity)
  - Boys' and Girls' Cross Country
- Winter
  - Boys' Basketball (JV, Varsity)
  - Girls' Basketball (JV, Varsity)
  - Wrestling
- Spring
  - Baseball (JV, Varsity)
  - Softball (JV, Varsity)

== Traditions ==
=== Reindeer Games ===
The Reindeer Games are a yearly tradition at Gateway. Held by the Student Council in the High School gym, students compete in various activities and other games to earn spirit points for their respective classes.

=== Junior Prom ===
Every year, the junior class organizes a prom, which is attended by both juniors and seniors. It is usually held at another location.

=== Spring Fling ===
Hosted by the Student Council, Spring Fling brings students outside to enjoy the end of the school year.

== Notable alumni ==
- Wayne Granger, Major League Baseball player

== See also ==
- Education in Massachusetts
