= Chester Elementary School =

Chester Elementary School may refer to:

- Chester Elementary School - Chester, California - Plumas Unified School District
- Chester Elementary School - Chester, Connecticut - Regional School District 4
- Chester Elementary School - Chester, Massachusetts - Gateway Regional School District
- Chester Elementary School - Chester, New York - Chester Union Free School District
- Chester Elementary School - Spokane Valley, Washington - Central Valley School District
