= Gateway Regional School District =

Gateway Regional School District may refer to one of several school districts in the United States:

- Gateway Regional School District (Massachusetts)
- Gateway Regional High School (New Jersey), a grade 7–12 high school and its school district
