= Glendale Falls =

Glendale Falls may refer to:

- Glendale Falls (Hamilton, Ontario)
- Glendale Falls (Massachusetts)
