= 1918 United States Senate election in Massachusetts =

- November 5, 1918
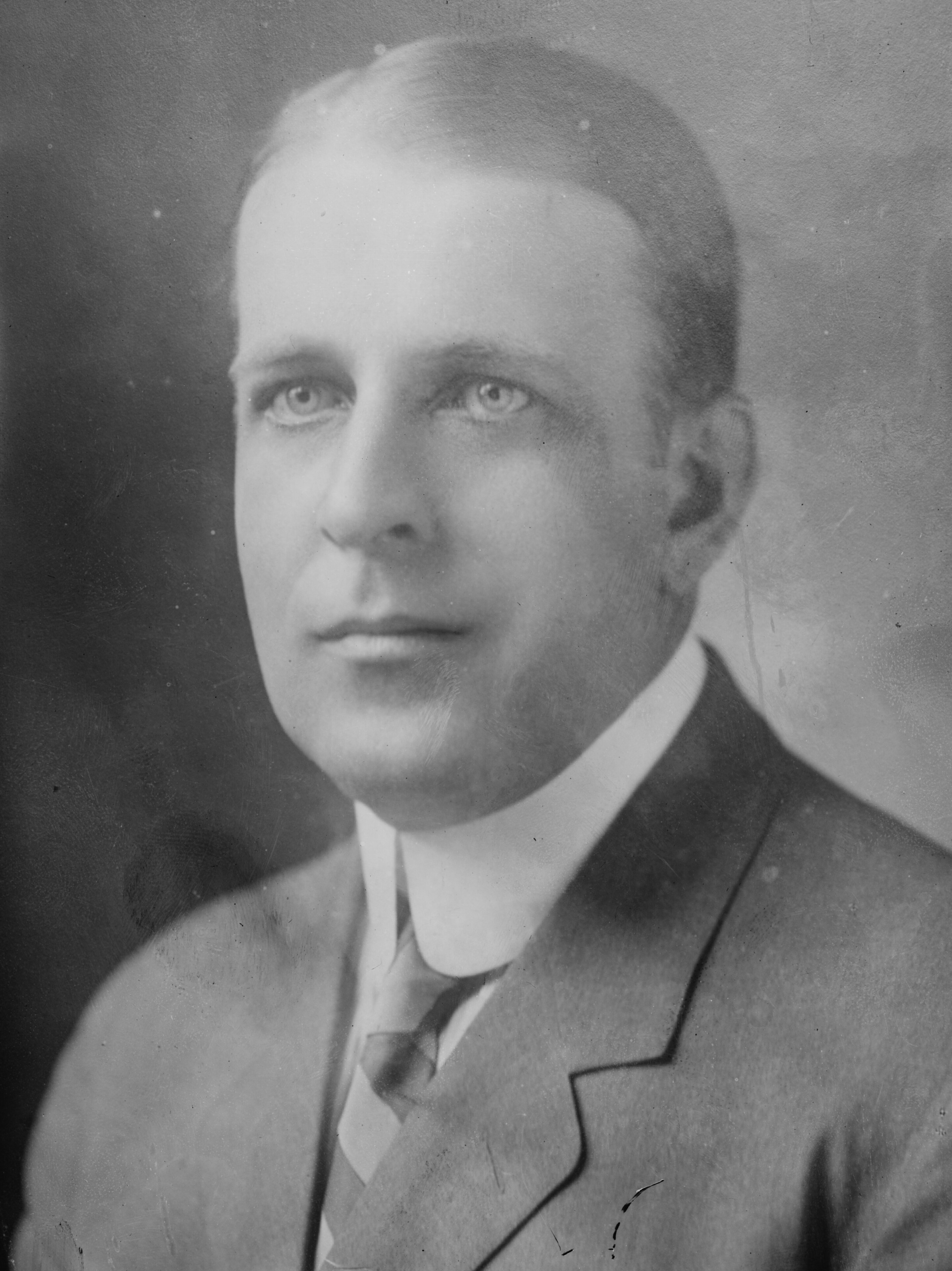

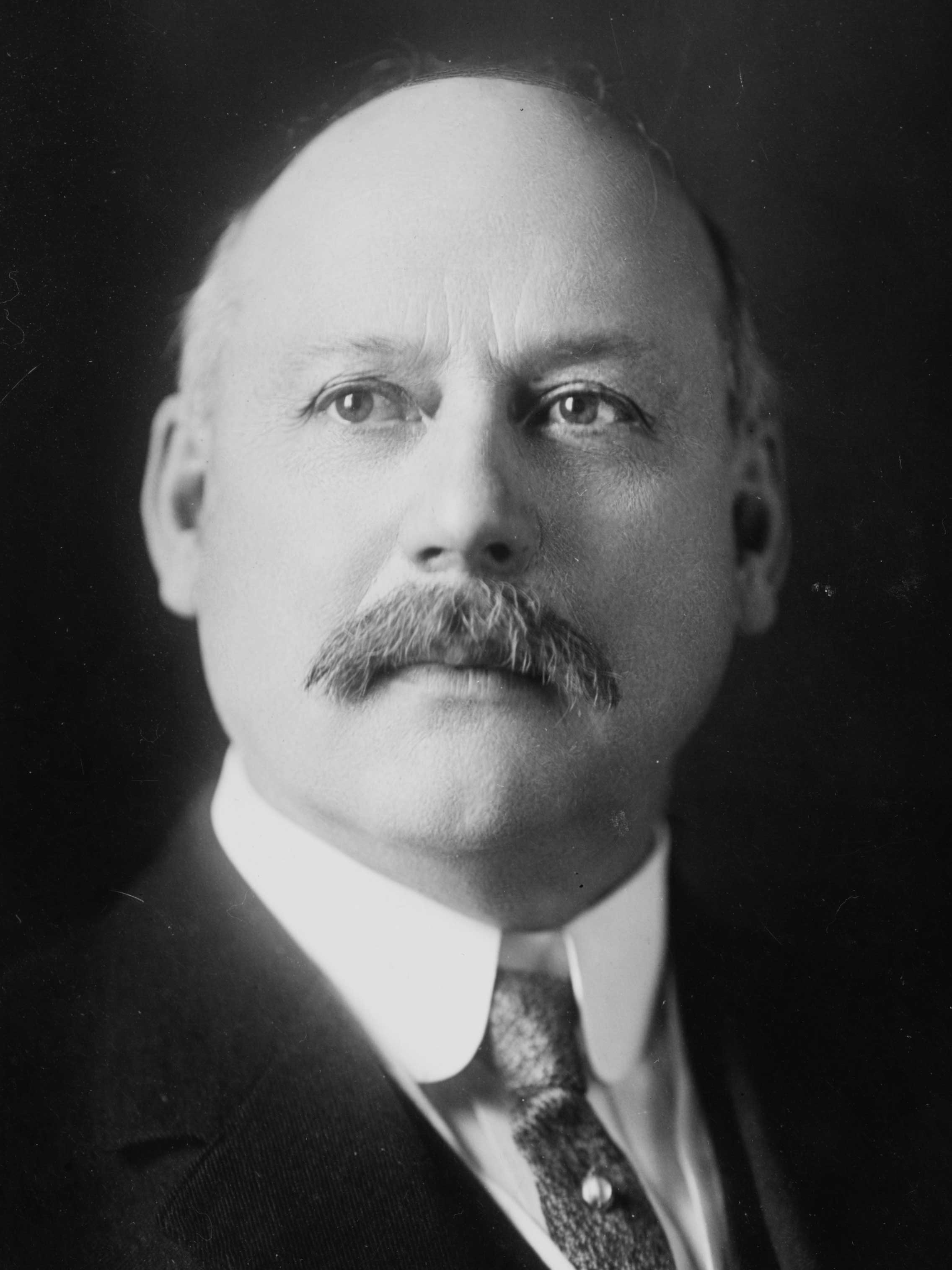

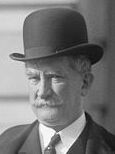
Nominee	David I. Walsh	John W. Weeks	Thomas W. Lawson
Party	Democratic	Republican	Independent
Popular vote	207,478	188,287	21,985
Percentage	49.66%	45.06%	5.26%
- Walsh: 40–50% 50–60% 60–70% 70–80% Weeks: 30–40% 40–50% 50–60% 60–70% 70–80% 80–90% >90% Tie: 40–50%
Senator before election
John W. Weeks
Republican
Elected Senator
David I. Walsh
Democratic

The United States Senate election of 1918 in Massachusetts was held on November 5. Incumbent Republican Senator John W. Weeks ran for a second term in office but was defeated by Democratic former Governor David I. Walsh.

Primaries were held September 24. Both Walsh and Weeks were unopposed after their respective opponents, former Boston mayor John F. Fitzgerald and Governor Samuel W. McCall, withdrew from the race.

Walsh became the first U.S. Senator from Massachusetts elected to a full term as a member of the modern Democratic Party. (A previous Democratic U.S. Senator, Robert Rantoul Jr., served only one month in 1851 after winning a special election.) This was the only senate seat that Democrats flipped during this cycle, and it was the first time that this seat had been won by a non-Republican since 1855.

== Background ==
The election was held mid-way through President Woodrow Wilson's second term in office. Following the sinking of the passenger ship Lusitania and two years of debate, the United States entered World War I with a declaration of war on Germany on April 6, 1917, and spent much of 1917 and 1918 building up a sufficient fighting force to contribute to the Allied effort in Europe.

Senator John Wingate Weeks had been a leading conservative critic of the Wilson administration and a candidate for president in 1916, though his appeal was limited to New England. He failed to win the Republican nomination when the national convention settled on Charles Evans Hughes, who lost narrowly to Wilson. Weeks kept up his criticism of Wilson as American war involvement grew, calling Secretary of War Newton Baker a "pacifist by nature" and publicly calling the president's management of materiel and domestic coal into question.

== Republican primary ==
=== Candidates ===
- John W. Weeks, incumbent Senator

==== Withdrew ====
- Samuel W. McCall, Governor of Massachusetts, former U.S. Representative, and candidate for Senate in 1913

=== Campaign ===
Early in the campaign, progressives hoped that Governor Samuel W. McCall would seek a rematch of the 1913 race, when he lost a protracted battle for the Republican nomination to Weeks on the thirty-first ballot. That election, which was decided by a caucus of the Republican state legislators, was held before the adoption of the Seventeenth Amendment to the United States Constitution and the direct primary system in Massachusetts, both progressive reforms which ostensibly gave McCall a comparative advantage. Weeks's anemic showing in the presidential campaign also hinted that he could be vulnerable.

McCall formally announced his intent to seek the Senate seat in August, criticizing Weeks as one of a class of Senators who represented capital over the interests of the people. His campaign also accused Weeks of vote buying for hosting dinners for various ethnic societies. McCall's campaign also argued that among the ethnic minorities, the Polish community of Massachusetts would support McCall. (Note: At the time, as a result of World War I, Poland was a renewed state and the Polish–Soviet War was developing, heightening Polish concerns in politics.)

The governor's campaign was aggressive but surprisingly brief; he withdrew by the end of the month, shocking observers. His decision was made upon determination that the conservative W. Murray Crane wing of the party remained loyal to Weeks and would ensure his re-nomination.

=== Results ===
Senator Weeks was unopposed for re-nomination.

1918 Republican U.S. Senate primary
Party	Candidate	Votes	%
Republican	John W. Weeks (incumbent)	77,659	99.90%
Write-in	All others	79	0.10%
Total votes		77,738	100.00%

== Democratic primary ==
=== Candidates ===
- David I. Walsh, former Governor of Massachusetts

==== Withdrew ====
- John F. Fitzgerald, former Mayor of Boston and U.S. Representative (ran for U.S. House, endorsed Walsh)

=== Results ===
Walsh was unopposed for the Democratic nomination.

1918 Democratic U.S. Senate primary
Party	Candidate	Votes	%
Democratic	David I. Walsh	46,356	99.98%
Write-in	All others	10	0.02%
Total votes		46,366	100.00%

== General election ==
=== Candidates ===
- Thomas W. Lawson, businessman and author (Independent)
- David I. Walsh, former Governor of Massachusetts (Democratic)
- John W. Weeks, incumbent Senator since 1913 (Republican)

=== Campaign ===
Walsh formally accepted the Democratic nomination at the state convention in Worcester on October 23. He pledged to "endeavor with all the ability and strength which I possess to assist... President Wilson in the... solution of those great problems... when peace shall come." He promised "unwavering support to President Wilson and his world work" and vowed to leave "nothing undone to help lighten the burdens ... of him whom Providence has chosen to direct us in these momentous times."

Days later, Weeks responded to the implicit criticism that he had obstructed the war effort: "I do not know of a man in the Senate who wants to do anything that might in any way interfere with the war's progress, but while conceding that government by dictation is necessary, I am not ready to abnegate my right to form my own judgments."

Despite abandoning his challenge, Governor McCall refused to campaign for Weeks in the general election; in addition to dividing the Republican vote, McCall thereby deprived Weeks, considered a drab speaker, of his widely regarded oratory talent.

=== Results ===
General election
Party	Candidate	Votes	%
Democratic	David I. Walsh	207,478	49.66%
Republican	John W. Weeks (incumbent)	188,287	45.06%
Independent	Thomas W. Lawson	21,985	5.26%
Write-in	All others	92	0.02%
Total votes		417,842	100.00%

Walsh defeated Weeks by nearly 20,000 votes, making him the only candidate to be elected on the Democratic Party ticket in the state.

Walsh's victory was credited to his progressive record as governor, his ability as an orator, and his Catholicism, as well as the personal support of President Wilson in contrast to Weeks's strident opposition. Walsh was the lone gain for the Democratic Party in the 1918 Senate elections. Observers also credited the result to the active campaign against Weeks by advocates of a federal amendment to guarantee women's suffrage.

== See also ==
- 1918 United States Senate elections
- 1918 Massachusetts Question 1
