= Russell (CDP), Massachusetts =

Russell, Massachusetts
- Census-designated place
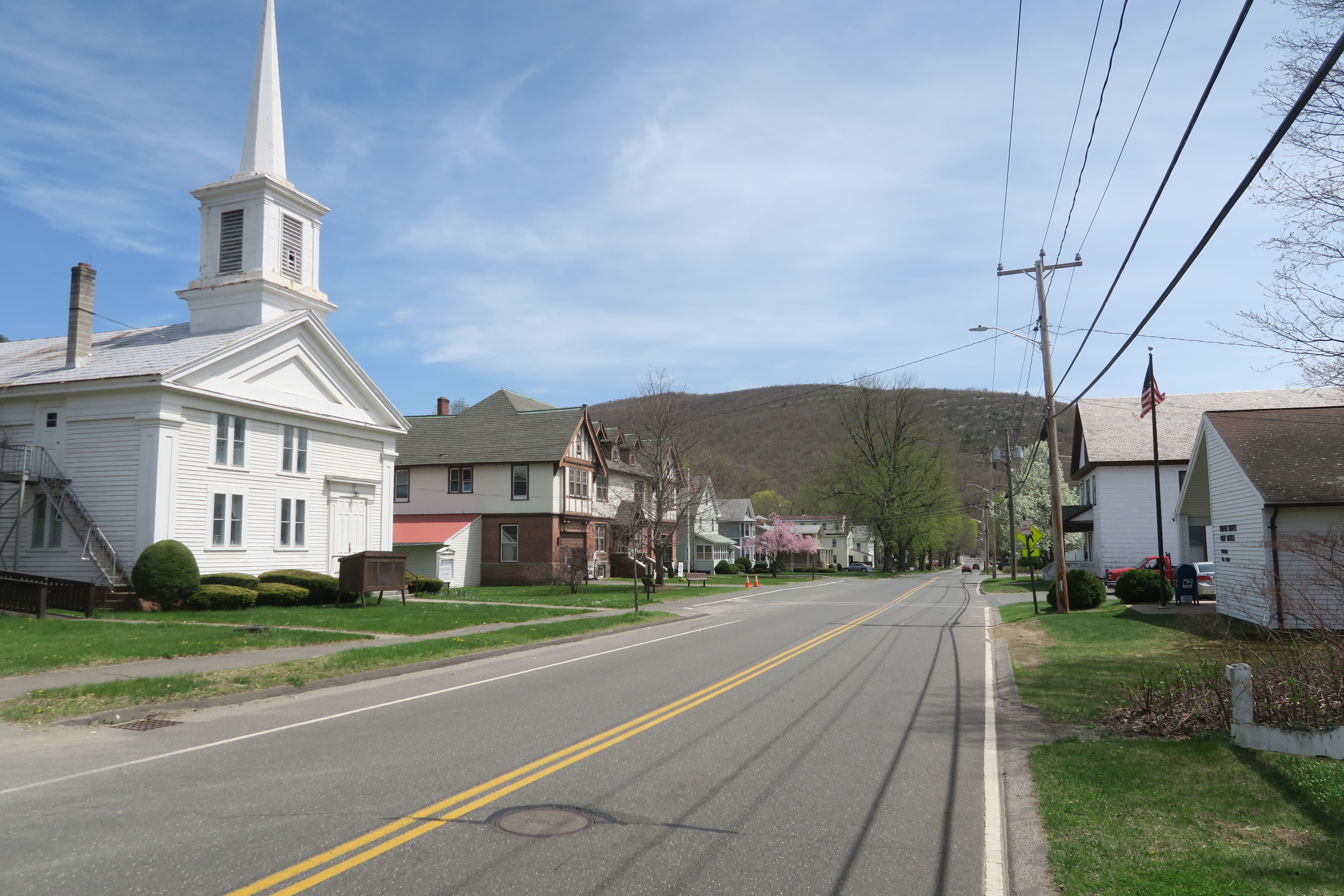
- Main Street

- Location in Hampden County in Massachusetts

- Location within Massachusetts Location within the United States
- Coordinates: 42°11′23″N 72°51′32″W
- Country: United States
- State: Massachusetts
- County: Hampden
- Town: Russell

Area
  - Total: 2.34 sq mi (6.07 km^{2})
  - Land: 2.30 sq mi (5.96 km^{2})
  - Water: 0.042 sq mi (0.11 km^{2})
- Elevation: 322 ft (98 m)

Population (2020)
  - Total: 690
  - Density: 299.8/sq mi (115.75/km^{2})
- Time zone: UTC-5 (Eastern (EST))
  - Summer (DST): UTC-4 (EDT)
- ZIP code: 01071
- Area code: 413
- FIPS code: 25-58615
- GNIS feature ID: 0608480

Russell is a census-designated place that comprises the populated center of the town of Russell in Hampden County, Massachusetts, United States. The population of the CDP was 786 at the 2010 census, out of 1,775 in the entire town of Russell. It is part of the Springfield, Massachusetts Metropolitan Statistical Area.

== Geography ==
The Russell CDP is in the northern part of the town of Russell, along U.S. Route 20 in the valley of the Westfield River. The CDP is bordered to the east by the Westfield River, to the west by the Blandford town line, and to the south by Blandford Stage Road. To the north, the CDP reaches to a line just south of the village of Crescent Mills. US 20 leads southeast from Russell down the Westfield River valley 8 miles (13 km) to Westfield and 19 miles (31 km) to Springfield, and northwest across the height of land of the Berkshires 27 miles (43 km) to Lee.

According to the United States Census Bureau, the Russell CDP has a total area of 2.3 square miles (6.0 km^{2}), of which 0.01 square miles (0.02 km^{2}), or 0.32%, are water.

== Demographics ==
Historical population
| Census | Pop. | Note | %± |
|---|---|---|---|
| 2020 | 690 | | — |
U.S. Decennial Census
