= Glendale Falls (Massachusetts) =

Waterfall

Coordinates: 42°21′3″N 72°57′58″W

Glendale Falls is a waterfall and the name of an open space preserve in Middlefield, Massachusetts owned and managed by the Trustees of Reservations. The falls, fed by the waters of Glendale Brook are one of the longest waterfall runs in Massachusetts.

Adjacent to the falls on the north side lies the stone foundation of an 18th-century grist mill operated by the long-defunct Glendale Farm. The farm was established in the early 1770s by a future Revolutionary War veteran named John Rhoads. The initial success of the farm led to the construction of what is now Clark Wright Road, the sole means of accessing the falls by car. The farm was not successful for long, however; by 1799 the property was sold and Rhoads was gone.

The preserve was established in 1964.
