= Gateway Regional School District (Massachusetts) =

School district in Massachusetts, United States

Gateway Regional School District is a school district serving students from eight Western Massachusetts towns: Huntington, Russell, Blandford, Dunwich, Chester, Montgomery, Middlefield, and Westfield.

The district consists of two elementary schools, a middle school, and a high school providing educational services to approximately 1,000 students in grades PreK–12.

== Schools ==
Gateway Regional's system includes:

- Gateway Regional High School
- Gateway Regional Middle School
- Littleville Elementary
- Chester Elementary

At one time, the Gateway district operated five elementary schools. Due to declining student numbers and reduced state revenue, the school committee voted to consolidate elementary schools (thereby closing Blandford Elementary School, R. H. Conwell Elementary School, and Russell Elementary School). Students that would have attended those schools now go to Littleville Elementary School in Huntington, or Chester Elementary School in Chester. R. H. Conwell re-opened under the name of R. H. Conwell Community Education Center for the 2010–2011 school year and ran as a private school by residents of the town of Worthington. The privately operated school operated until the 2014 - 2015 school year when in July of 2015 Worthington officially withdraw from the Gateway regional district and reopened R. H. Conwell as a public school within its own district for the 2015-2016 academic year.

== History ==
In 1949, the concept of a regional high school was presented to the townspeople by Superintendent, Dana O. Webber as a solution to the educational facilities problem in this valley. The idea was voted down at that time but was presented again in 1950-1951. Many meetings were held in the towns involved, and a brochure suggesting curriculum and cost was presented to the townspeople. But in 1952 the issue was once more turned down by the voters. It was not until 1955 that the matter was reconsidered. The committee spent more than a year trying to arrive at a solution best suited to the four towns, and in May 1957, Huntington and Montgomery voted in favor of accepting; Blandford had a tie vote; and Chester defeated the issue. In July of the same year, the towns of Huntington and Montgomery voted to form a two-town district, the nucleus of the eventual Gateway Regional School District. Worthington and Chester were admitted by amendment in 1959, but Chester withdrew in 1960.

At town meetings in 1961, initial funds were appropriated for capital outlay, and an option to purchase the present school site was taken. The architects and contractors were chosen, and ground-breaking ceremonies were held on June 28, 1962. Superintendent Dana O. Webber was elected Superintendent by the committee at its inception.. Mrs. Stella Belisle was elected clerk of the committee in 1961.

In the fall of 1962, the town of Middlefield requested an amendment for its admittance to the district, and in November that town was admitted. The new school began its official school year on Wednesday, September 4, 1963, with an enrollment of 240 Students.

In July of 2015 Worthington withdrew from the district, establishing its own primary school district and establishing an agreement with the Hampshire Regional School District for Junior and High School students from Worthington to attend that district’s secondary schools.
