= Russell, Massachusetts =

- Town
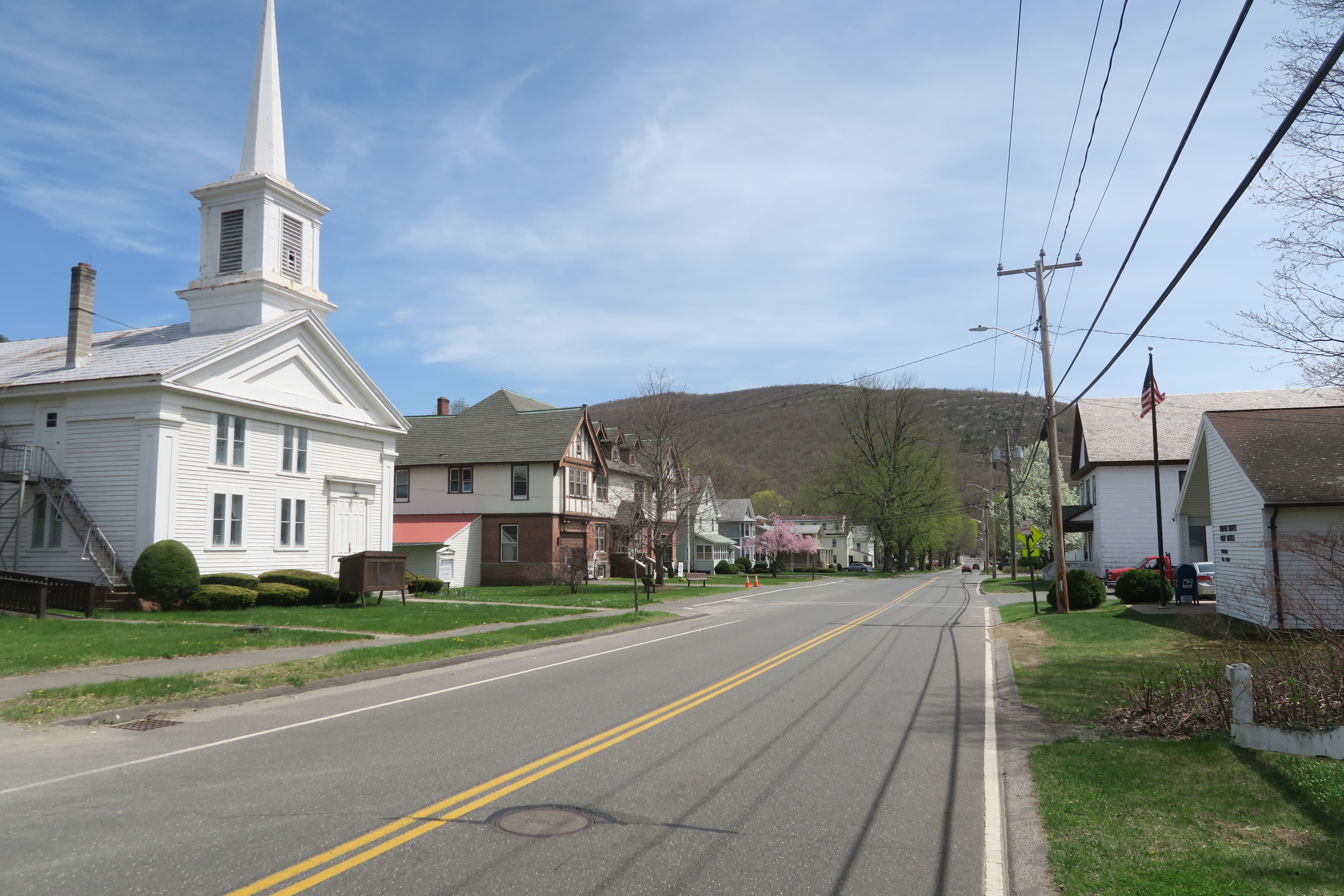
- Main Street in Russell

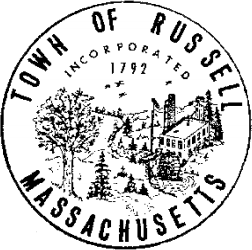
- Seal

- Location in Hampden County in Massachusetts
- Coordinates: 42°11′23″N 72°51′35″W
- Country: United States
- State: Massachusetts
- County: Hampden
- Settled: 1782
- Incorporated: 1792

Government
  - Type: Open town meeting

Area
  - Total: 17.8 sq mi (46.0 km^{2})
  - Land: 17.3 sq mi (44.9 km^{2})
  - Water: 0.42 sq mi (1.1 km^{2})
- Elevation: 299 ft (91 m)

Population (2020)
  - Total: 1,643
  - Density: 94.8/sq mi (36.6/km^{2})
- Time zone: UTC−5 (Eastern)
  - Summer (DST): UTC−4 (Eastern)
- ZIP Codes: 01071 (Russell); 01097 (Woronoco)
- Area code: 413
- FIPS code: 25-58650
- GNIS feature ID: 0618190
- Website: www.townofrussell.us

Russell is a town in Hampden County, Massachusetts, United States. The population was 1,643 at the 2020 census. It is part of the Springfield, Massachusetts Metropolitan Statistical Area.

== History ==
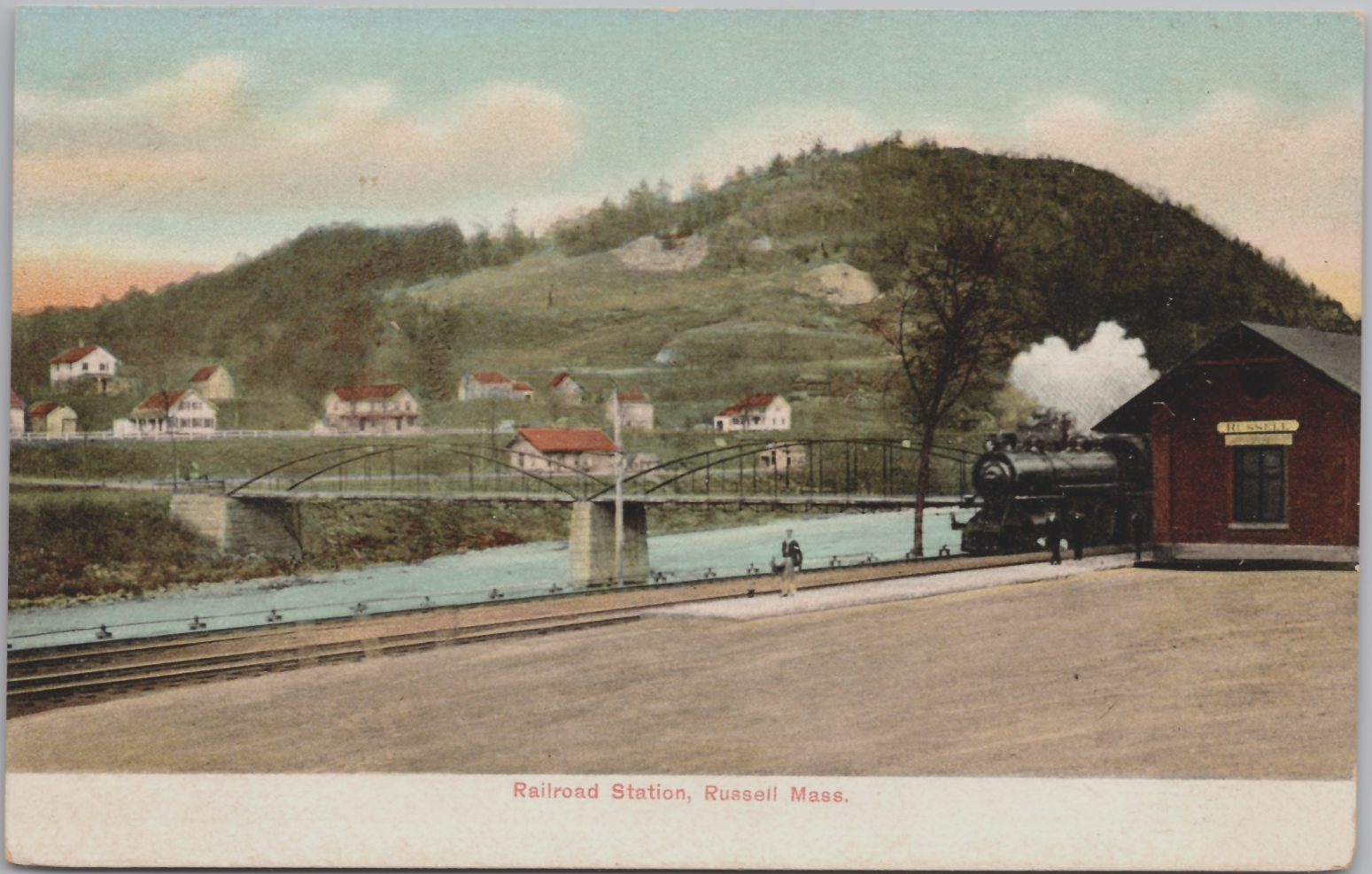
Railroad station, c. 1901–1907

Russell was originally part of the Pocumtuc (also called Deerfield) nation, who spoke an Algonquian language. Like most native peoples, they were decimated by smallpox, then their participation in King Philip's War 1675–1676 proved their undoing as victory by colonial forces led to the dispersal of remnants of this tribe west into New York and north into Canada.

Although the way was open for settlement beyond the Pioneer Valley lowlands, the thin, rocky soil and hilly topography of uplands to the west delayed settlement until about 1725, when there was no more promising land left to settle in the valley. Because river valleys in the hilly areas were subject to cold air pockets and late frosts—especially during the Little Ice Age that persisted until the late 19th century—most early settlement was in uplands in and near South Quarter. Relatively unproductive soils and small fields were not conducive to growing cash crops, so farming was more of a subsistence nature. Most of what was consumed on these farms was homemade or bartered for.

The upland farm population peaked around 1800, when more productive farmland opened up beyond the Appalachian Mountains in western New York and the Northwest Territory—today's Great Lakes states. Employment opportunities became significant by about 1825 as the first (water power-dependent) Industrial Revolution unfolded in New England. The cash income gave farmsteads access to manufactured goods and imported food such as cane sugar from the West Indies in lieu of local maple products. Farming became more of a part-time occupation and a growing number of farms were abandoned, gradually reverting to forest until only stonewalls and cellar holes remain.

The Industrial Revolution led to development in the Westfield River valley, as the water power potential of the three cascades was developed for industrial use. Three villages developed around mills at the cascades, and the easy grades along the valley were utilized for a railroad route across the Berkshires' 1,400 feet (430 m) of relief.

A small upstream village near the Huntington border was called Crescent Mills. Originally a Chapin and Gould Paper Company mill, Texxon still operates a mill there that makes special fabrics for shoes. The middle settlement and the town's administrative center is called Russell Village. Westfield River Paper Company manufactured glassine and other specialty papers there until it was decommissioned and then bought for a proposed biomass electric plant utilizing local cordwood. Russell Village was a virtually self-sufficient community as late as the 1950s, with several stores, a barbershop, and several restaurants; then increasing automobile ownership brought the greater commercial offerings in Westfield and other Pioneer Valley cities within reach.

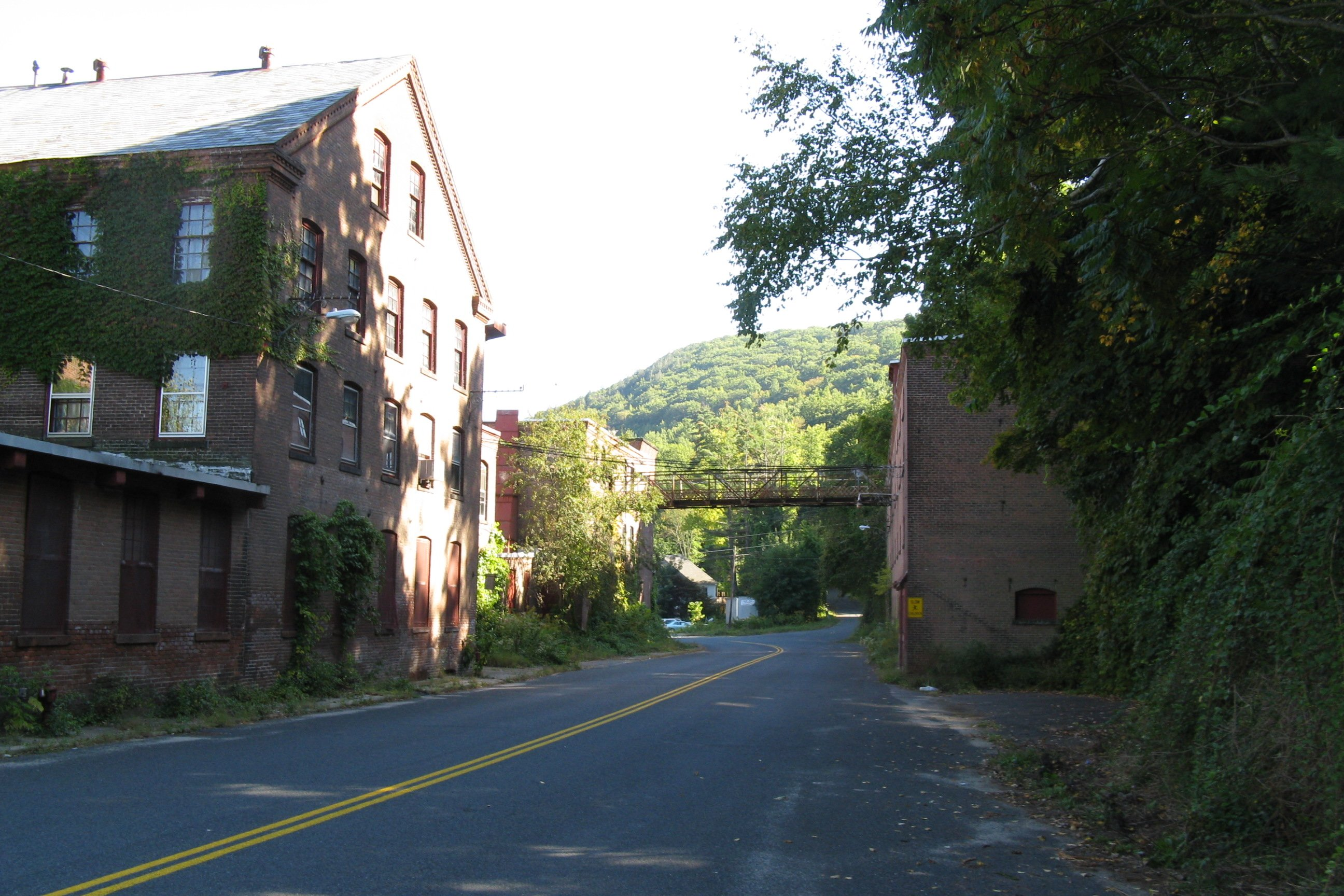
Woronoco

The lower industrial village was named Woronoco after a local tribe, and the local cascades were once called Salmon Falls, presumably because Atlantic salmon were observed and captured there. Strathmore Paper Company manufactured high-quality bond papers at this location until it was taken over by International Paper and then decommissioned. Strathmore was originally purchased by Horace A. Moses in 1904. Moses, later co-founder of Junior Achievement, was a visionary social engineer as well as an industrialist who developed Woronoco as a model company town with housing of a notably high standard and buildings accommodating a wide variety of community activities. The factory, and the town it created, were based upon his journey to the factory town of Strathmore, Scotland. Moses also developed a 1,600-acre (6.5 km^{2}) estate around Russell Pond in South Quarter, where he raised both award-winning apples and prized hunting dogs. He later sold off sections of the estate to the Hampden Council of the Boy Scouts of America. Today, the Horace A. Moses Scout Reservation contains many buildings original to Moses and his staff, including his summer home, which is known simply as "The Manor House". The property is thought to be one of the last homes of the rare Scottish thistle, which Moses imported from Scotland in the 1930s.

In 1965 Russell joined with neighboring towns to form Gateway Regional School District that now educates some 1,300 students at an annual cost to taxpayers of about $15,000 per student. With very little industrial and commercial property to share this tax burden, Russell has one of the highest tax rates per unit assessed value in the state.

Westfield River Paper Company shut down operations in 1994, while Strathmore Paper was purchased by International Paper Co. and ceased operations in 1999. This left the town with no industrial tax base other than the small Texxon plant in Crescent Mills. Retail operations are also very limited, with residents mostly commuting to Westfield and West Springfield to shop.

In the 1990s Mennonites moved from western Pennsylvania to Russell where they established a church, a furniture factory/showroom called "Country Woodcraft" and a bakery shop called "Bread Basket". On September 11 of every year since 2003 the Mennonite Youth Chorus from Russell has offered songs of remembrance for victims of the terrorist attack at the Ground Zero site of the World Trade Center in New York City.

In 2004 a biomass generating plant was proposed to take advantage of the former Westfield River Paper Co. site along the Westfield River with access to water, the former Boston and Albany Railroad line, and supplies of waste wood as a byproduct of real estate development, logging and forestry work. The proposal proved highly controversial. While it would have created a number of jobs and lightened the tax burden, opponents raised concerns of truck traffic through town, air pollution, water withdrawals and thermal pollution of water returned to the river after use for cooling purposes.

As of 2010, political issues in Russell largely revolve around the tax base and economy.

== Geography ==
Russell is in western Hampden County, bordered by Granville to the south, Blandford to the west, Huntington to the north, Montgomery to the northeast and Westfield to the southeast. The main village, Russell, is in the northwestern part of town and is a census-designated place. The village of Woronoco is in the eastern part of town. Both villages are along the Westfield River and are connected by U.S. Route 20, which leads southeast 8 miles (13 km) to Westfield and northwest 27 miles (43 km) to Lee. Interstate 90, the Massachusetts Turnpike, crosses the center of Russell, but has no exits in the town.

According to the United States Census Bureau, the town of Russell has a total area of 17.8 square miles (46.0 km^{2}), of which 17.3 square miles (44.9 km^{2}) are land and 0.42 square miles (1.1 km^{2}), or 2.39%, are water.

The town features two very different topographical sections: South Quarter is mainly uplands at elevations from 1,000 to 1,400 feet (300 to 430 m) along the rim of a plateau west of the Connecticut River Valley, while the rest of the town is a deep valley along the swift Westfield River.

The South Quarter uplands end at an escarpment near the southeastern border of the town, the edge of a rift valley originating in the Mesozoic Era when Europe and North America separated. The Connecticut River still follows this rift valley, known as the Pioneer Valley for its early settlement by English Puritans. The escarpment between the South Quarter uplands and the valley is forested—too steep to farm—and dissected by streams that have eroded ravines back into the uplands.

Along the Westfield River valley, during the Pleistocene epoch, continental glaciers scraped away soil and steepened cliffs on hills around the valley, particularly on Mounts Tekoa and Shatterack east of the river, and on Turtle Bend Mountain standing in the middle of the valley. Although none of these peaks actually rises much above the surrounding plateau, their precipitous slopes make them appear impressively high from the valley.

As continental glaciers receded northward, a glacial moraine dammed the Connecticut River below Hartford, producing 200-mile-long (320 km) Lake Hitchcock, with an arm extending northwest along the Westfield River. Gravel banks large enough to be commercially valuable were deposited in Russell where the river entered the erstwhile lake.

The river has three widely separated cascades within the town, dropping about 90 feet (27 m) in total that figured in the township's industrial development, above.

== Demographics ==
Historical population
Year	Pop.	±%
1850	521	—
1860	605	+16.1%
1870	635	+5.0%
1880	823	+29.6%
1890	879	+6.8%
1900	793	−9.8%
1910	965	+21.7%
1920	1,237	+28.2%
1930	1,237	+0.0%
1940	1,242	+0.4%
1950	1,298	+4.5%
1960	1,366	+5.2%
1970	1,382	+1.2%
1980	1,570	+13.6%
1990	1,594	+1.5%
2000	1,657	+4.0%
2010	1,775	+7.1%
2020	1,643	−7.4%
2022	1,631	−0.7%
Source: United States census records and Population Estimates Program data.

As of the census of 2010, there were 1,775 people, 656 households, and 498 families residing in the town. The population density was 100.9 people per square mile (39/km^{2}). There were 699 housing units at an average density of 39.7 per square mile (15.3/km^{2}). The racial makeup of the town was 97.7% White, 0.7% African American, 0.2% Native American, 0.3% Asian, 0.1% from other races, and 1.0% from two or more races. Hispanic or Latino of any race were 2.6% of the population.

There were 656 households, out of which 31.1% had children under the age of 18 living with them, 57.8% were married couples living together, 6.6% had a female householder with no husband present, and 24.1% were non-families. 16.3% of all households were made up of individuals, and 4.8% had someone living alone who was 65 years of age or older. The average household size was 2.7 and the average family size was 3.0.

In the town, the population was spread out, with 25% under the age of 18 and 9.9% who were 65 years of age or older. The median age was 40.4 years. The town is 49.2% male and 50.8% female.

The median income for a household in the town was $57,308 and the median income for a family was $58,498. About 7.1% of families and 9.0% of the population were below the poverty line, including 14.7% of those under age 18 and 5.7% of those age 65 or over.

== Education ==
There are no schools in town. Students attend Littleville Elementary School, Gateway Regional Middle School, Gateway Regional Junior High School, and Gateway Regional High School in Huntington.

== Politics ==
In the 2020 presidential election, the town provided Libertarian Party nominee Jo Jorgensen with her highest percentage of the vote statewide. Out of 919 votes cast in the town, Jorgensen received 28 (3.05 percent) votes. Former President Donald Trump won the town with 512 votes (55.71 percent) over then-former Vice President Joe Biden with 366 votes (39.83 percent). Green Party nominee Howie Hawkins obtained six votes (0.65 percent) and there were seven write-ins (0.76 percent).

== Notable people ==
- Clarissa Chapman Armstrong, missionary in Hawaii, born in Russell
- Reuben Atwater Chapman, chief justice of the Massachusetts Supreme Court, born in Russell
- Joel Doolittle, justice of the Vermont Supreme Court, born in Russell

== See also ==
- List of mill towns in Massachusetts
