= Middlefield, Massachusetts =

- Town
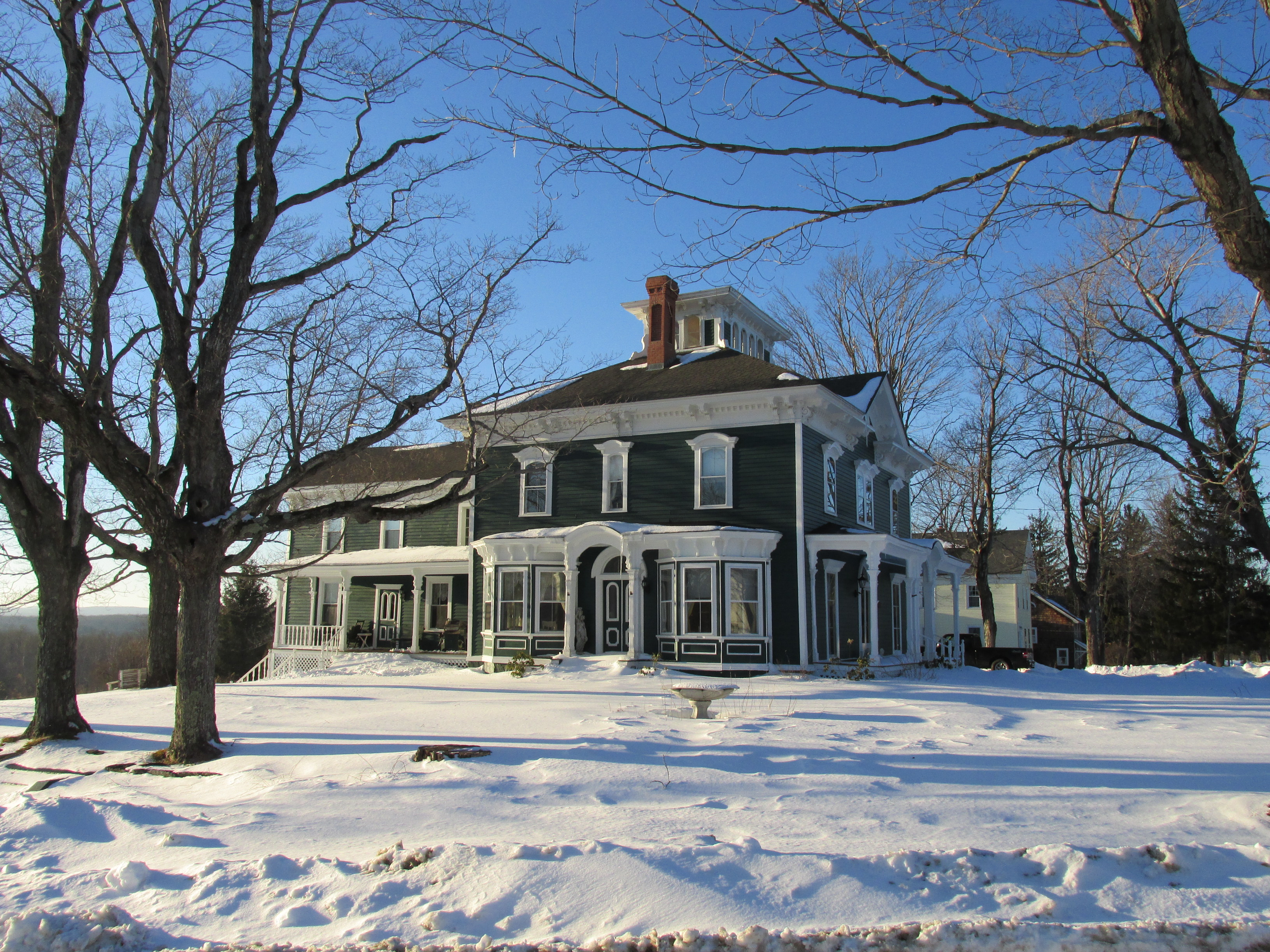
- The Big House, built in 1869

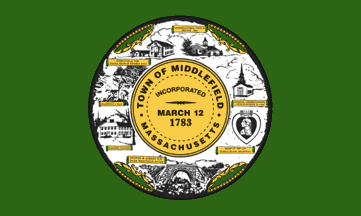
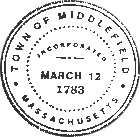
- Flag Seal

- Location in Hampshire County in Massachusetts
- Coordinates: 42°20′54″N 73°00′56″W
- Country: United States
- State: Massachusetts
- County: Hampshire
- Settled: 1780
- Incorporated: 1783

Government
  - Type: Open town meeting

Area
  - Total: 24.2 sq mi (62.6 km^{2})
  - Land: 24.2 sq mi (62.6 km^{2})
  - Water: 0 sq mi (0.0 km^{2})
- Elevation: 1,677 ft (511 m)

Population (2020)
  - Total: 385
  - Density: 15.9/sq mi (6.15/km^{2})
- Time zone: UTC−5 (Eastern)
  - Summer (DST): UTC−4 (Eastern)
- ZIP Codes: 01243 (Middlefield); 01011 (Chester); 01050 (Huntington)
- Area code: 413
- FIPS code: 25-40990
- GNIS feature ID: 0618204
- Website: www.middlefield-ma.gov

Middlefield is a town in Hampshire County, Massachusetts, United States. The population was 385 at the 2020 census. It is part of the Springfield, Massachusetts Metropolitan Statistical Area.

== History ==
Middlefield was first settled in 1780 and was officially incorporated in 1783.

== Geography ==
According to the United States Census Bureau, the town has a total area of 24.2 square miles (63 km^{2}), of which 24.2 square miles (63 km^{2}) is land and 0.04% is water.

== Demographics ==
Historical population
Year	Pop.	±%
1790	608	—
1850	737	+21.2%
1860	748	+1.5%
1870	728	−2.7%
1880	648	−11.0%
1890	455	−29.8%
1900	410	−9.9%
1910	354	−13.7%
1920	280	−20.9%
1930	197	−29.6%
1940	201	+2.0%
1950	295	+46.8%
1960	315	+6.8%
1970	288	−8.6%
1980	385	+33.7%
1990	392	+1.8%
2000	542	+38.3%
2010	521	−3.9%
2020	385	−26.1%
2024*	397	+3.1%
* = population estimate.

As of the census of 2000, there were 542 people, 213 households, and 161 families residing in the town. The population density was 22.4 people per square mile (8.7/km^{2}). There were 263 housing units at an average density of 10.9 per square mile (4.2/km^{2}). The racial makeup of the town was 98.89% White, 0.18% African American, 0.18% Native American, 0.18% from other races, and 0.55% from two or more races. Hispanic or Latino of any race were 0.55% of the population.

There were 213 households, out of which 28.6% had children under the age of 18 living with them, 66.7% were married couples living together, 5.2% had a female householder with no husband present, and 24.4% were non-families. Of all households 17.4% were made up of individuals, and 6.1% had someone living alone who was 65 years of age or older. The average household size was 2.54 and the average family size was 2.86.

In the town, the population was spread out, with 23.1% under the age of 18, 5.9% from 18 to 24, 31.2% from 25 to 44, 30.3% from 45 to 64, and 9.6% who were 65 years of age or older. The median age was 40 years. For every 100 females, there were 103.8 males. For every 100 females age 18 and over, there were 101.4 males.

The median income for a household in the town was $50,938, and the median income for a family was $53,889. Males had a median income of $35,208 versus $30,375 for females. The per capita income for the town was $24,137. About 7.3% of families and 8.6% of the population were below the poverty line, including 9.2% of those under age 18 and none of those age 65 or over.

== Government ==
The town is part of the Third Hampden District in the Massachusetts House of Representatives, represented by Nicholas A. Boldyga, and the Berkshire, Franklin, Hampshire and Hampden Senate district, represented by Paul W. Mark.

== Notable people ==
- Israel Bissell, Patriot post rider
- Elijah Churchill, Revolutionary War hero, recipient of one of the three Purple Hearts Washington presented
- Ebenezer Emmons, geologist
- Martha Stewart, businesswoman and television hostess

== Sites of interest ==
- Glendale Falls

Glendale Brook provides one of Massachusetts' longest waterfalls. The brook eventually feeds into the Westfield River, which has been federally designated as a Wild and Scenic River. The Glendale Falls site itself is part of the Glendale Falls Reservation.

- Middlefield Fair

The Middlefield Fair, a small country-style fair, established in 1855, is hosted annually by the Highland Agricultural Society, and is held in August over three days. The 2013 event was the 158th occurrence. There are many events for attendees of all ages, including tractor pulls, pie eating contests, and agricultural contests.

== See also ==
- Gateway Regional School District
