= 1936 United States presidential election in Massachusetts =

- November 3, 1936
- Turnout: 75.9% ▲6.4 pp

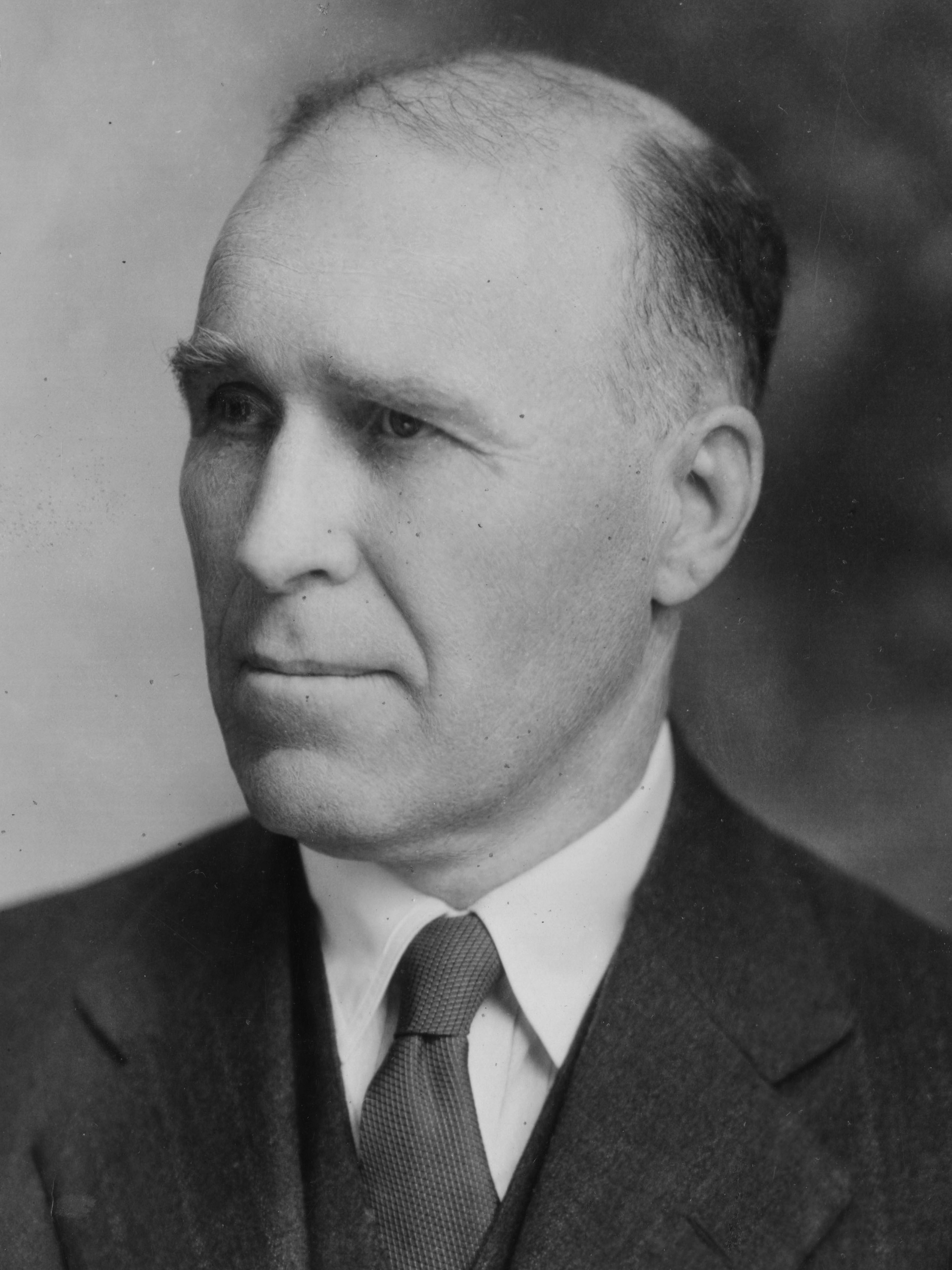
Nominee	Franklin D. Roosevelt	Alf Landon	William Lemke
Party	Democratic	Republican	Union
Home state	New York	Kansas	North Dakota
Running mate	John Nance Garner	Frank Knox	Thomas C. O'Brien
Electoral vote	17	0	0
Popular vote	942,716	768,613	118,639
Percentage	51.22%	41.76%	6.45%

Roosevelt
40–50%
50–60%
60–70%
70–80%
Landon
40–50%
50–60%
60–70%
70–80%
80–90%
90–100%
President before election
Franklin D. Roosevelt
Democratic
Elected President
Franklin D. Roosevelt
Democratic

The 1936 United States presidential election in Massachusetts took place on November 3, 1936, as part of the 1936 United States presidential election, which was held throughout all contemporary 48 states. Voters chose 17 representatives, or electors to the Electoral College, who voted for president and vice president.

Massachusetts voted for the Democratic nominee, incumbent President Franklin D. Roosevelt of New York, over the Republican nominee, Governor Alf Landon of Kansas. Roosevelt ran with incumbent Vice President John Nance Garner of Texas, while Landon's running mate was newspaper publisher Frank Knox of Illinois. Also running that year was William Lemke of the short-lived Union Party, and his running mate Thomas C. O'Brien.

Roosevelt carried the state with 51.22% of the vote to Landon's 41.76%, a Democratic victory margin of 9.46%. Lemke came in third, with 6.45%, while in a distant fourth was Socialist Norman Thomas with only 0.28%. Massachusetts weighed in as about 14.8% more Republican than the nation.

In the Jacksonian era, Massachusetts had been a typically Whig state, and after the founding of the Republican Party, it transitioned to being a bastion of Yankee Republicanism. In 1928, with Al Smith heading the Democratic ticket, a coalition of Irish Catholic and other ethnic immigrant voters primarily based in urban areas flipped Massachusetts and neighboring Rhode Island Democratic for the first time since before the Civil War (or, in Massachusetts' case, ever), leaving aside Wilson's low plurality wins in these states in the three-way race of 1912.

However, Massachusetts trended hard towards Hoover in 1932, giving Roosevelt only a four-point win despite having voted for Smith four years earlier, displaying something of a 'snapback' to its traditional New England Republican roots. As Roosevelt was re-elected nationally in a massive landslide, Massachusetts remained well to the right of the nation overall. Whereas pre-New Deal Republicans from south and west of the Hudson showed very little loyalty to their old party following the Depression, in New England, Republicans became galvanized to slow FDR's expansion of the public sector.

A contributing factor to Roosevelt's relative weakness in Massachusetts was the strong showing of William Lemke in the state. Lemke and his Union Party ran on a populist platform that appealed to many working-class voters who might otherwise have been natural members of Roosevelt's New Deal coalition. While Lemke finished with only 1.95 percent nationally, in Massachusetts, Lemke received 6.45 percent of the vote, making Massachusetts his third strongest state in the nation. Lemke fared particularly well in poor Catholic precincts of Massachusetts and Rhode Island, where he even outpolled Landon in all Irish neighborhoods save Brighton. In the poorest Irish neighborhoods, Lemke reached over 16 percent of the vote; in contrast he received less than his national average in Boston's richest precincts.

This is the last election in which the towns of Dana, Enfield, Greenwich, and Prescott voted in a presidential election as they were disincorporated in 1938 due to the construction of the Quabbin Reservoir and all their territory was absorbed into surrounding towns

== Results ==
1936 United States presidential election in Massachusetts
Party	Candidate	Votes	Percentage	Electoral votes
Democratic	Franklin D. Roosevelt (inc.)	942,716	51.22%	17
Republican	Alf Landon	768,613	41.76%	0
Union	William Lemke	118,639	6.45%	0
Socialist	Norman Thomas	5,111	0.28%	0
Communist	Earl Browder	2,930	0.16%	0
Socialist Labor	John W. Aiken	1,305	0.07%	0
Prohibition	D. Leigh Colvin	1,032	0.06%	0
Write-ins	Write-ins	11	0.00%	0
Totals		1,840,357	100.00%	17

=== Results by county ===
County	Franklin D Roosevelt Democratic		Alf Landon Republican		William Lemke Union		Various candidates Other parties		Margin		Total votes cast
County	#	%	#	%	#	%	#	%	#	%	Total votes cast
Barnstable	4,751	28.82%	11,337	68.77%	310	1.88%	87	0.53%	-6,586	-39.95%	16,485
Berkshire	29,087	54.30%	22,607	42.20%	1,571	2.93%	303	0.57%	6,480	12.10%	53,568
Bristol	80,805	57.25%	49,754	35.25%	9,765	6.92%	821	0.58%	31,051	22.00%	141,145
Dukes	931	35.60%	1,655	63.29%	19	0.73%	10	0.38%	-724	-27.69%	2,615
Essex	106,078	47.57%	97,310	43.64%	18,176	8.15%	1,435	0.64%	8,768	3.93%	222,999
Franklin	9,324	39.31%	13,756	57.99%	515	2.17%	126	0.53%	-4,432	-18.68%	23,721
Hampden	80,164	57.19%	51,288	36.59%	7,929	5.66%	799	0.57%	28,876	20.60%	140,180
Hampshire	15,412	49.87%	14,012	45.34%	1,131	3.66%	351	1.14%	1,400	4.53%	30,906
Middlesex	189,512	45.17%	199,704	47.60%	28,386	6.77%	1,918	0.46%	-10,192	-2.43%	419,520
Nantucket	548	35.49%	969	62.76%	25	1.62%	2	0.13%	-421	-27.27%	1,544
Norfolk	57,770	38.80%	82,545	55.44%	7,732	5.19%	843	0.57%	-24,775	-16.64%	148,890
Plymouth	30,466	39.05%	41,942	53.76%	5,096	6.53%	506	0.65%	-11,476	-14.71%	78,010
Suffolk	223,732	63.92%	96,418	27.55%	27,799	7.94%	2,061	0.59%	127,314	36.37%	350,010
Worcester	114,136	54.15%	85,316	40.48%	10,185	4.83%	1,127	0.53%	28,820	13.67%	210,764
Totals	942,716	51.22%	768,613	41.76%	118,639	6.45%	10,389	0.56%	174,103	9.46%	1,840,357

==== Counties that flipped from Republican to Democratic ====
- Essex
- Hampshire
- Worcester

== Analysis ==
Roosevelt and Landon would split the state's 14 counties, winning 7 counties each. Roosevelt and Landon both did well in some of the Bay State's population centers, with Roosevelt carrying Suffolk, Worcester, and Hampden Counties (home to Boston, Worcester, and Springfield, respectively), and Landon carrying the suburban counties of Middlesex and Norfolk.

This was the last election that the former towns of Dana, Enfield, Greenwich, and Prescott participated in, as these staunchly Republican towns ceased to exist in 1938 when they were flooded to construct the Quabbin Reservoir. All four towns voted for Landon.

== See also ==
- United States presidential elections in Massachusetts
