= Quabbin =

Quabbin may refer to:

- Quabbin Aqueduct
- Quabbin Reservoir
- Quabbin Valley
- Greenwich, Massachusetts, first organized as Quabbin in 1739 and Quabbin Parrish in 1754.
