= Ripton (fictitious town) =

Fictitious town in Massachusetts, US

Ripton is a fictitious town in Massachusetts, United States. In 1985, Hugh Davis, brother of Hester A. Davis and a professor at the University of Massachusetts Amherst, along with George "Gige" Darey, a local selectman, sought to demonstrate and protest the ignorance of the state bureaucracy in Boston of the rural portions of the Commonwealth. To do so, he invented the town of Ripton, supposedly founded in 1767. He then proceeded to apply for various grants and other official assistance, and the town was allotted funds in the state budget. Several checks were issued, and deposited in an escrow account, before the hoax was uncovered. The funds were returned and the matter dropped.

In 1985, self-appointed representatives of the town of Ripton contacted the U.S. Air Force and invited them to situate antennas for a post-nuclear war communication system in their town. Robbins Phillips, chairman of the Board of Selectmen of Ripton, stated that the antennas would make good nesting places for eagles.

Some signposts in the western portion of Massachusetts still contain "directions" to Ripton. Lawmakers in western Massachusetts have continued to humorously reference the incident in proposed state budgets.

In his 2003 novel Stillwater, William Weld re-introduces and relocates fictional Ripton from the Berkshires to Hampshire County as a fifth town flooded by the construction of the Quabbin Reservoir in the late 1930s, joining the actual disincorporated and flooded towns of Prescott, Enfield, Greenwich, and Dana.
