= Goodnough Dike =

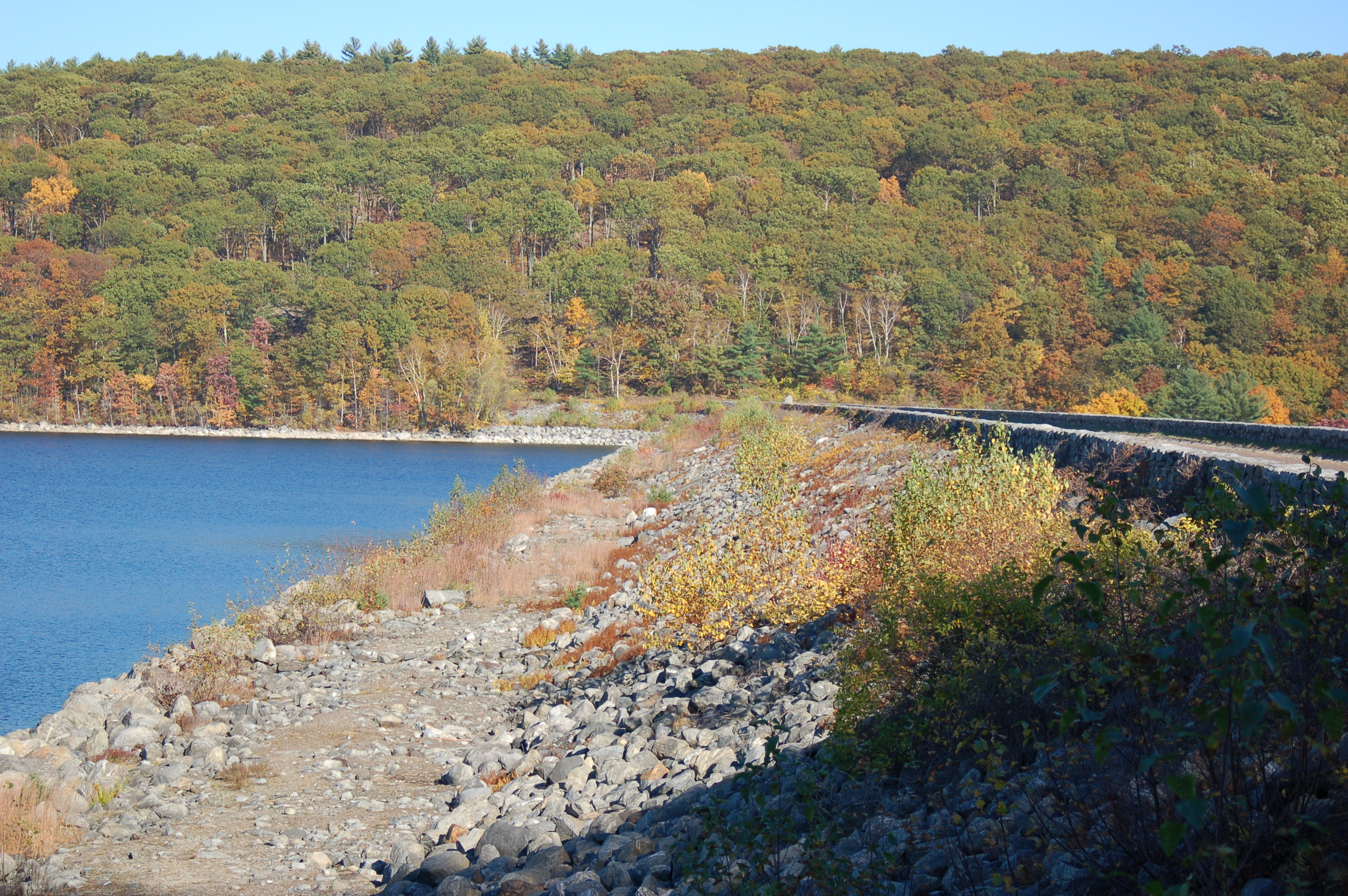
- The wet side
- Interactive map of Goodnough Dike
- Official name: Goodnough Dike
- Location: Ware, Massachusetts
- Coordinates: 42°17′51″N 72°17′56″W
- Construction began: 1933
- Opening date: 1938
- Operator: MWRA

Dam and spillways
- Impounds: Beaver Brook
- Height: 264 ft (80 m)
- Length: 2,140 ft (650 m)
- Width (base): 878 ft (268 m)

Reservoir
- Creates: Quabbin Reservoir

The Goodnough Dike (actually a dam) is on the southeastern end of the Quabbin Reservoir, the largest water body in Massachusetts. It impounds the waters of Beaver Brook and therefore closes that exit to the Chicopee River Watershed. The Goodnough Dike is not as large as the Winsor Dam, but it is equally important as they both trap the waters of the Quabbin Reservoir. This dam is part of the metropolitan Boston's water supply, maintained by the Massachusetts Water Resources Authority.

== Technical information ==
The dam was built 1933–38. Its width at the top is 35 ft (11 m) and 878 ft (268 m) at the bottom. It is 264 ft (80 m) above the bedrock and 135 ft (41 m) above Beaver Brook. There was 2.5 million cubic yards of fill used in the construction and the dam contains 31 caissons. The elevation is 540 ft (160 m) MSL.

== History ==
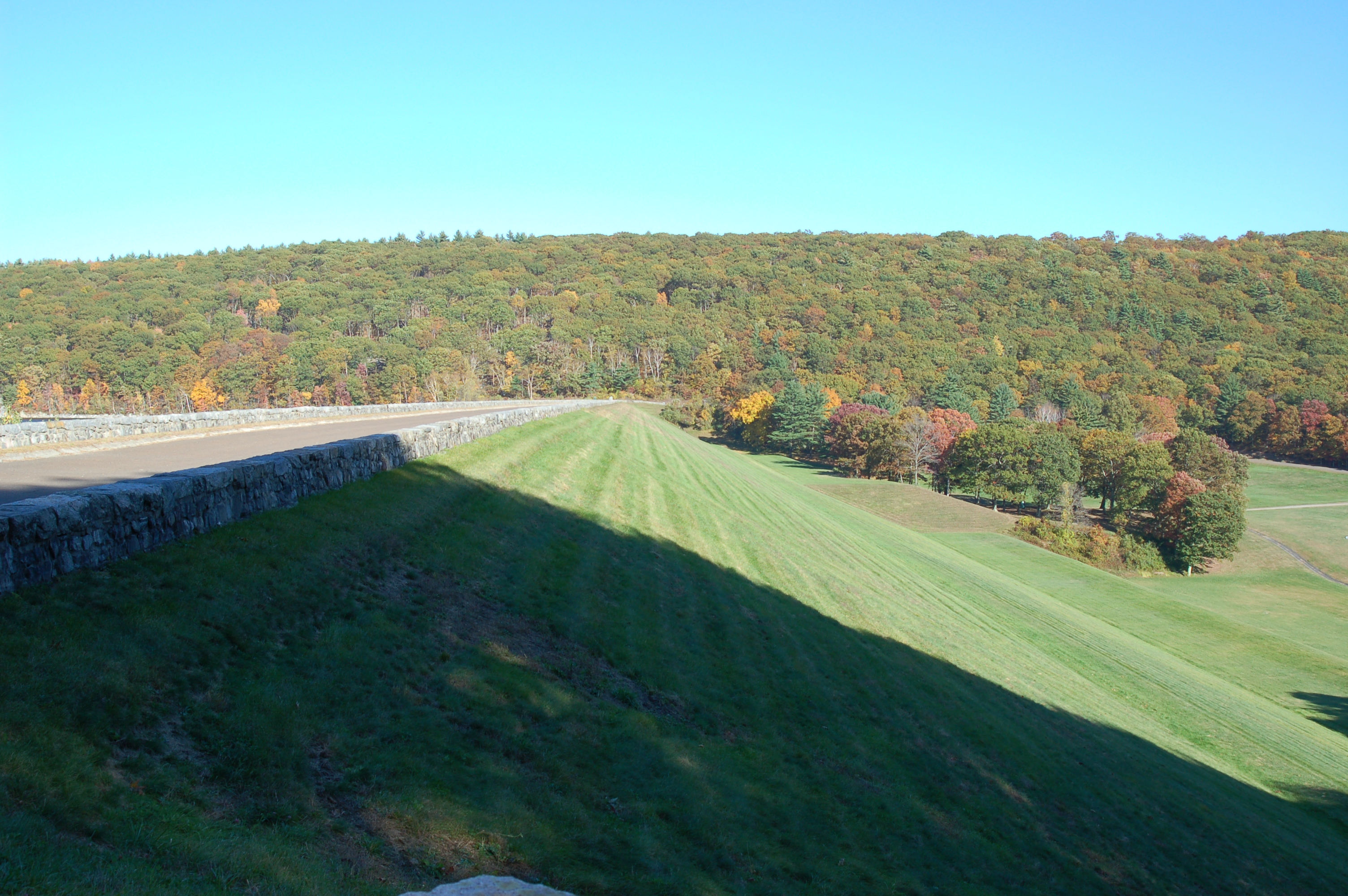
The Beaver Brook side of Goodnough Dike

The dam was named after X. Henry Goodnough, who was chair of the Boston Metropolitan Water and Sewer Board during 1921. This dike is part of the Quabbin Reservoir facility. This dike is sometimes called the Quabbin Dike, however its name has never been changed from its original and, in fact, remains as originally named, imprinted on the plaques and signs at the site in the Quabbin Reservoir reservation. Frank E. Winsor was chief engineer of the Board from 1926 until his death in 1939 and as such was deeply involved in the design construction of Goodnough Dike as well as Winsor Dam and Quabbin Reservoir

The Quabbin Reservoir is one of the largest fabricated public water supplies in the United States. Created in the 1930s by the construction of two huge earthen dams, the Winsor Dam, and the Goodnough Dike, the reservoir is fed by the Swift River, and seasonally the Ware River. Four towns were flooded in the Swift River Valley. Construction of the reservoir remains a great engineering feat and Quabbin is one of the largest unfiltered water supplies in the world. The reservoir is 18 miles (29 km) long and has 181 miles (291 km) of shoreline including 61 miles (98 km) along the reservoir's 60 islands. Quabbin collects an average of one-half of the precipitation that falls on its watershed. When full, the reservoir holds about 412 billion US gallons (1.56×10^{9} m^{3}) of water.
