= Frank E. Winsor =

American engineer (1870–1939)

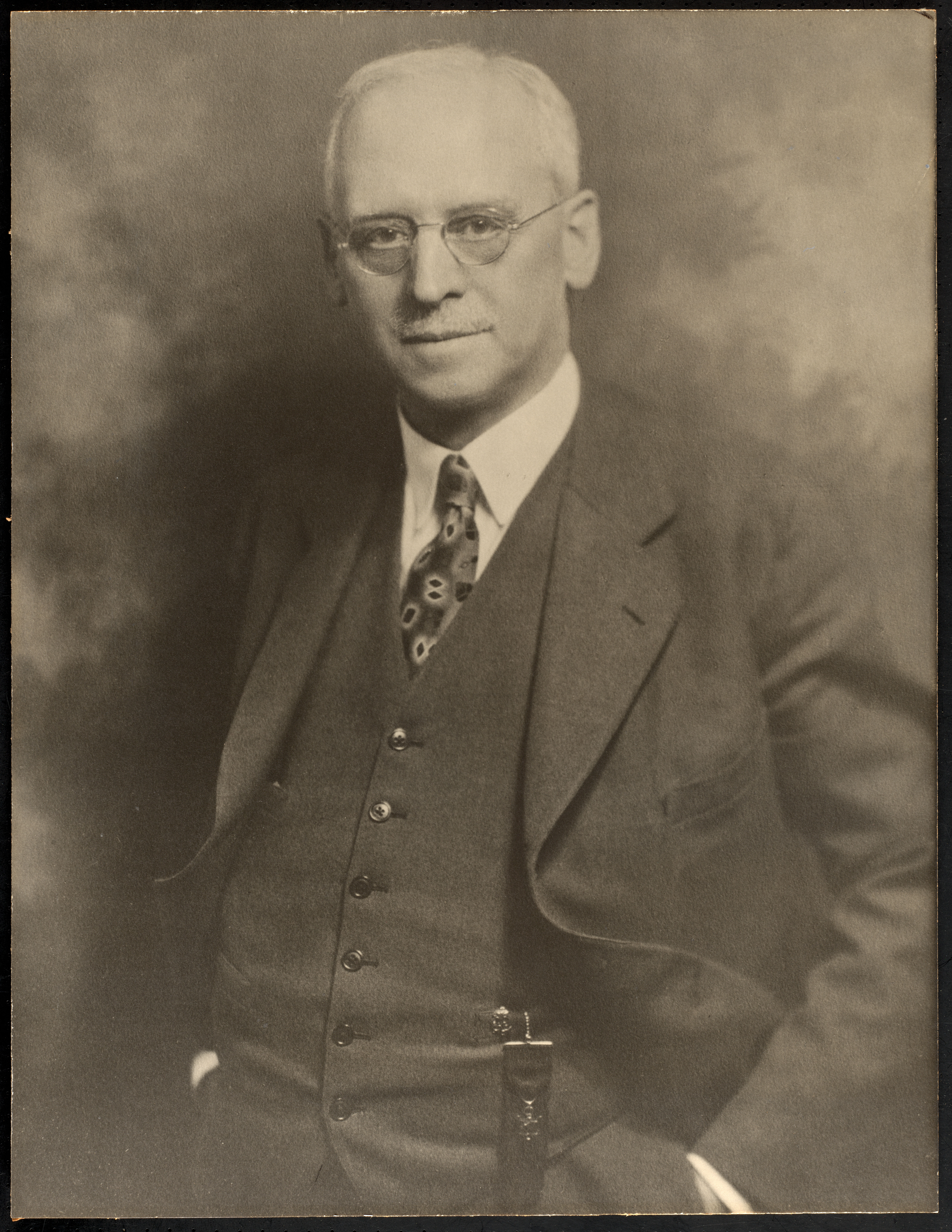
- Born: November 16, 1870; Providence, Rhode Island
- Died: January 30, 1939 (aged 68); Newton, Massachusetts
- Education: Brown University
- Occupation: Civil engineer
- Spouse: Catherine Holbrook Burton (m. 1893)
- Children: 3, including Lucy

Frank E. Winsor (1870–1939) was the chief engineer for the Boston Metropolitan District Water Supply Commission, now the Massachusetts Water Resources Authority, from 1926 until his death in 1939 and was closely involved in the design and construction of Winsor Dam and Goodnough Dike which were built by the commission to create the Quabbin Reservoir in Massachusetts. Winsor Dam was named for him.

== Personal history and education ==
Frank Edward Winsor was born November 16, 1870, in Providence, Rhode Island and died on January 30, 1939, a resident of West Newton, Massachusetts, where he had lived for many years at 189 Mt. Vernon Street. He received a Ph.B in 1892, an A.M. in 1896 an Sc.D. in 1929, all from Brown University. He later sat on Brown's board of trustees. He was licensed as a Civil Engineer in 1892.

== Marriage and family ==
On October 25, 1893, Frank E. Winsor married Catherine Holbrook Burton, who later taught at Brown. They had two daughters and a son. Their oldest child, Lucy, (April 16, 1897 – October 9, 1989), was a professor of economics at Wellesley College. She was married to Hugh B. Killough, (December 30, 1892 – December 13, 1976) who was a professor of economics at Brown. Together they wrote many books on business, economics and industry.

== Early work ==
His early work was on water and sewer projects for Boston. He was one of the engineers on the design and building of the Wachusett Dam. He also did work for the Charles River Basin Commission. From 1903 to 1915 he worked on projects for New York City including being in charge of the construction of the Kensico and Hillview reservoirs and 32 miles (51 km) of Catskill Aqueduct. Frank E. Winsor was a Fellow of the American Academy of Arts and Sciences and a director and vice president of the American Society of Civil Engineers.

== Work for Providence ==
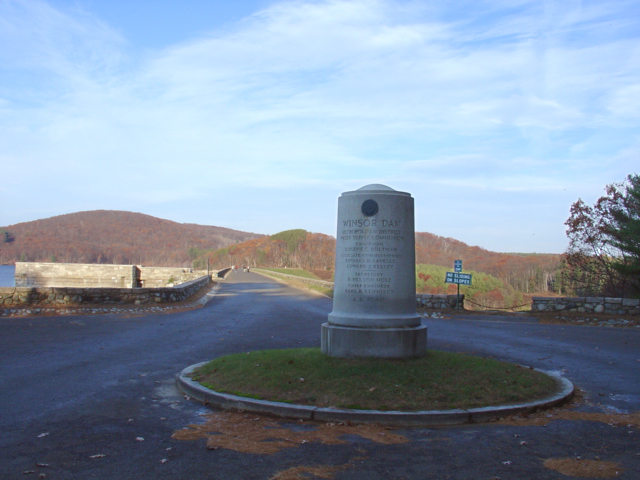
Winsor Dam on the Quabbin

From 1915 to 1926, Frank E. Winsor was chief engineer for the new water supply project for Providence, which involved the design and construction of the Scituate Reservoir and the earthen dam necessary to create it and the building of a water treatment plant. Like Quabbin Reservoir in Massachusetts, Scituate Reservoir is the largest body of water in its state. At the completion ceremonies for the project on September 30, 1926, Providence Mayor Joseph H. Gainer called Winsor "[T]he man to whom most of the credit for this undertaking belongs." The dam is known today as the Gainer Memorial Dam in honor of the mayor.

== Quabbin Reservoir, Winsor Dam and Goodnough Dike ==
Frank E. Winsor left his successful work on the Scituate Reservoir for Providence to go on to greater work as chief engineer for the Metropolitan District Water Supply Commission in Massachusetts. His greatest accomplishment was the design and construction of Quabbin Reservoir and the Winsor Dam and Goodnough Dike which were built to dam the waters of the Swift River to create the reservoir. The dams were finished shortly after his death in 1939, but the Quabbin Reservoir did not fill to its maximum holding capacity until 1946.

== Resources ==
- Providence Tribute to Frank E. Winsor
- Details of the history of providing water for Boston
- Structural information on Winsor Dam
- Who Was Who in America, Vol. 1, 1897-1942 (1962) Chicago: Marquis Who's Who, p. 1367. Biographical article on Frank Edward Winsor.
