= Winsor Dam =

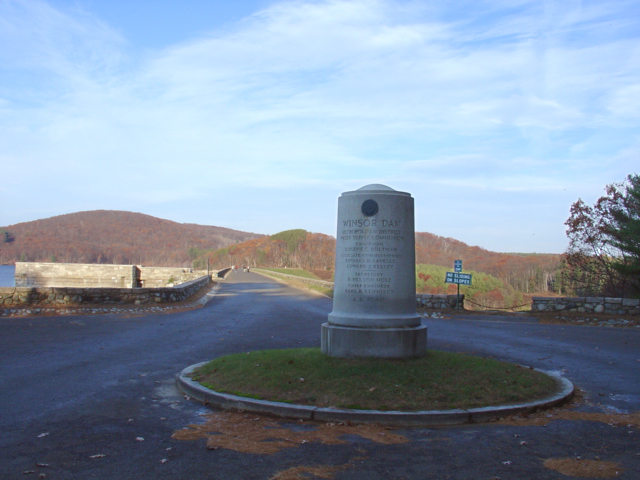
- Winsor Dam on the Quabbin
- Interactive map of Winsor Dam
- Official name: Winsor Dam
- Location: Ware / Belchertown, Massachusetts, USA
- Coordinates: 42°16′59″N 72°20′36″W
- Construction began: 1935
- Opening date: 1939
- Operator: MWRA

Dam and spillways
- Impounds: Swift River
- Height: 295 ft (90 m)
- Length: 2,640 ft (805 m)
- Width (base): 1100 ft (335 m)

Reservoir
- Creates: Quabbin Reservoir

The Winsor Dam and the Goodnough Dike impound the waters of the Swift River and the Ware River Diversion forming the Quabbin Reservoir, the largest body of water in Massachusetts. According to the Massachusetts Department of Conservation and Recreation the Winsor Dam is one of the largest dams in the Eastern U.S. The Winsor Dam is part of the Chicopee River Watershed. The Winsor Dam was named for Frank E. Winsor, its chief engineer.

== Characteristics ==
Winsor Dam bridge
- Coordinates: 42°16′59″N 72°20′36″W
- Carries: Winsor Dam Road

Characteristics
- Width: Two lanes
- Clearance above: Unrestricted

Statistics
- Daily traffic: Closed

Location
- Interactive map of Winsor Dam bridge

The dam has the following characteristics:

- Length: 2640 ft (805 m)
- Top width: 35 ft (10.7 m)
- Max. bottom width: 1100 ft (335 m)
- Height above river: 170 ft (52 m)
- Height above bedrock: 295 ft (90 m)
- Amount of earth fill: 4 million cubic yards (3,000,000 m^{3}).
