= Ripton =

Ripton may refer to:

== People ==
- Ripton Hylton (born 1957), birth name of Jamaican reggae musician Eek-A-Mouse
- Ripton MacPherson (1922–2011), Jamaican politician and attorney

== Other uses ==
- Ripton, Vermont, United States, a town
- Ripton (fictitious town), Massachusetts, United States, a hoax
- Cary Ripton, a character in the related novels The Regulators and Desperation, both by Stephen King

== See also ==
- Ripton Community House, Ripton, Vermont, on the National Register of Historic Places
