= Nichewaug, Massachusetts =

Village in Massachusetts, United States

Coordinates: 42°26′15″N 72°12′13″W

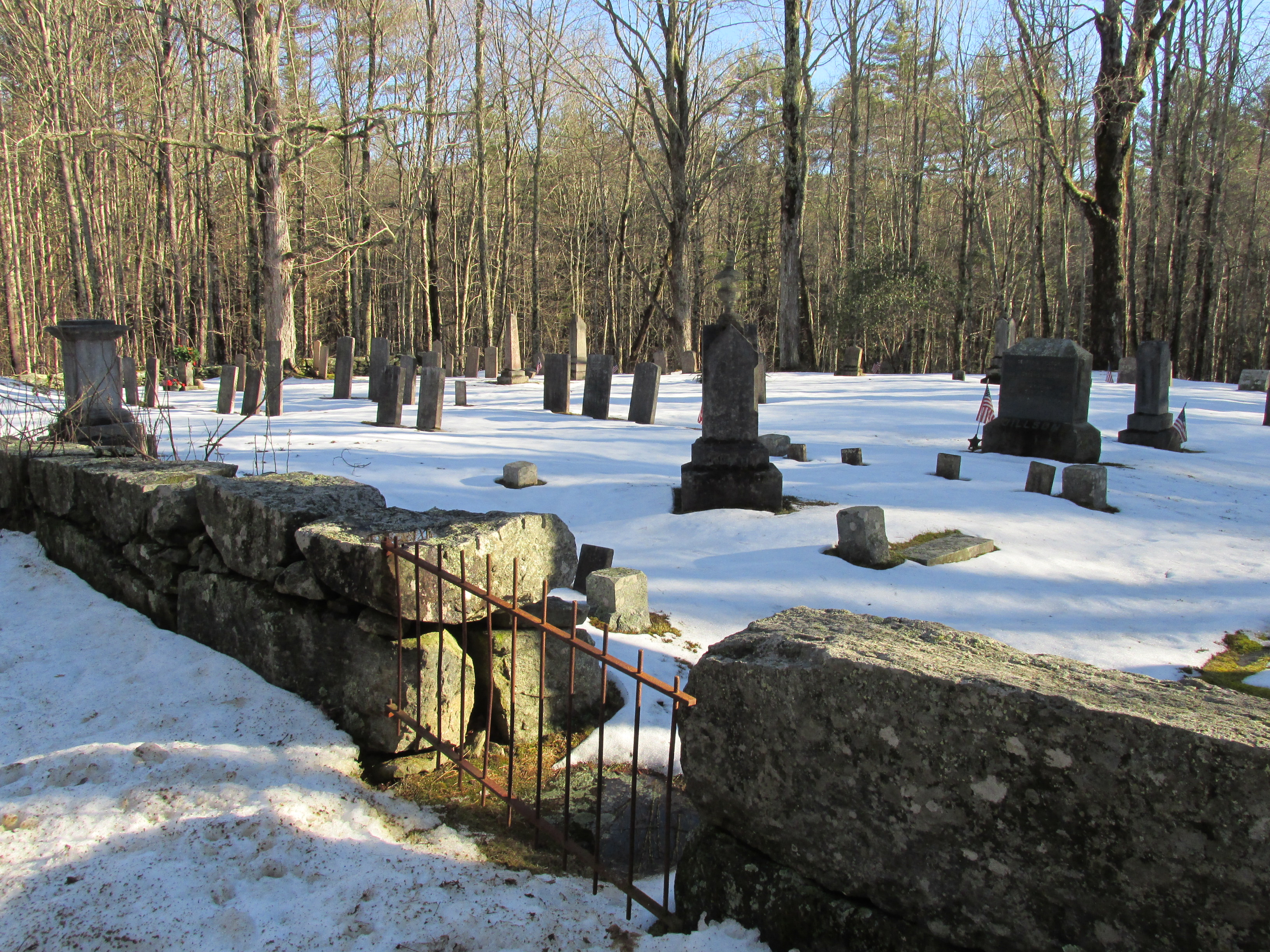
Nichewaug Cemetery

Nichewaug is a village in Massachusetts, part of the town of Petersham. It is close to the Quabbin Reservoir and the former town of Dana, Massachusetts. The village was likely depopulated due to the construction of the nearby reservoir, and has a few houses today. The village has been assigned the ZIP Code of 01366.

== Etymology ==
The name of the village means "the land between" in the long-extinct Loup A language spoken by the indigenous Nipmuck people.

== History ==
Prior to European arrival, which began in the early 18th century, the area had been a culturally significant meeting place for the Nipmuck people, who gathered resources there through waterways.
