= X. Henry Goodnough =

American engineer

- Born: October 23, 1860; Brookline, Massachusetts
- Died: August 10, 1935 (aged 74)
- Occupation: Engineer
- Known for: Quabbin Reservoir

X. Henry Goodnough (1860–1935) was an American engineer. Goodnough was chairman of Boston's Metropolitan Water District in the 1920s, and a chief advocate for the creation of the Quabbin Reservoir project. Goodnough Dike was named for him.

== Early life and education ==
Xanthus Henry Goodnough was born October 23, 1860, in Brookline, Massachusetts, the son of Xanthus Goodnough, a farmer and native of Newton, and his wife, Kate (Hurley) Goodnough, a native of New Brunswick, Canada. X. Henry Goodnough graduated from Harvard in 1882.

== Career ==
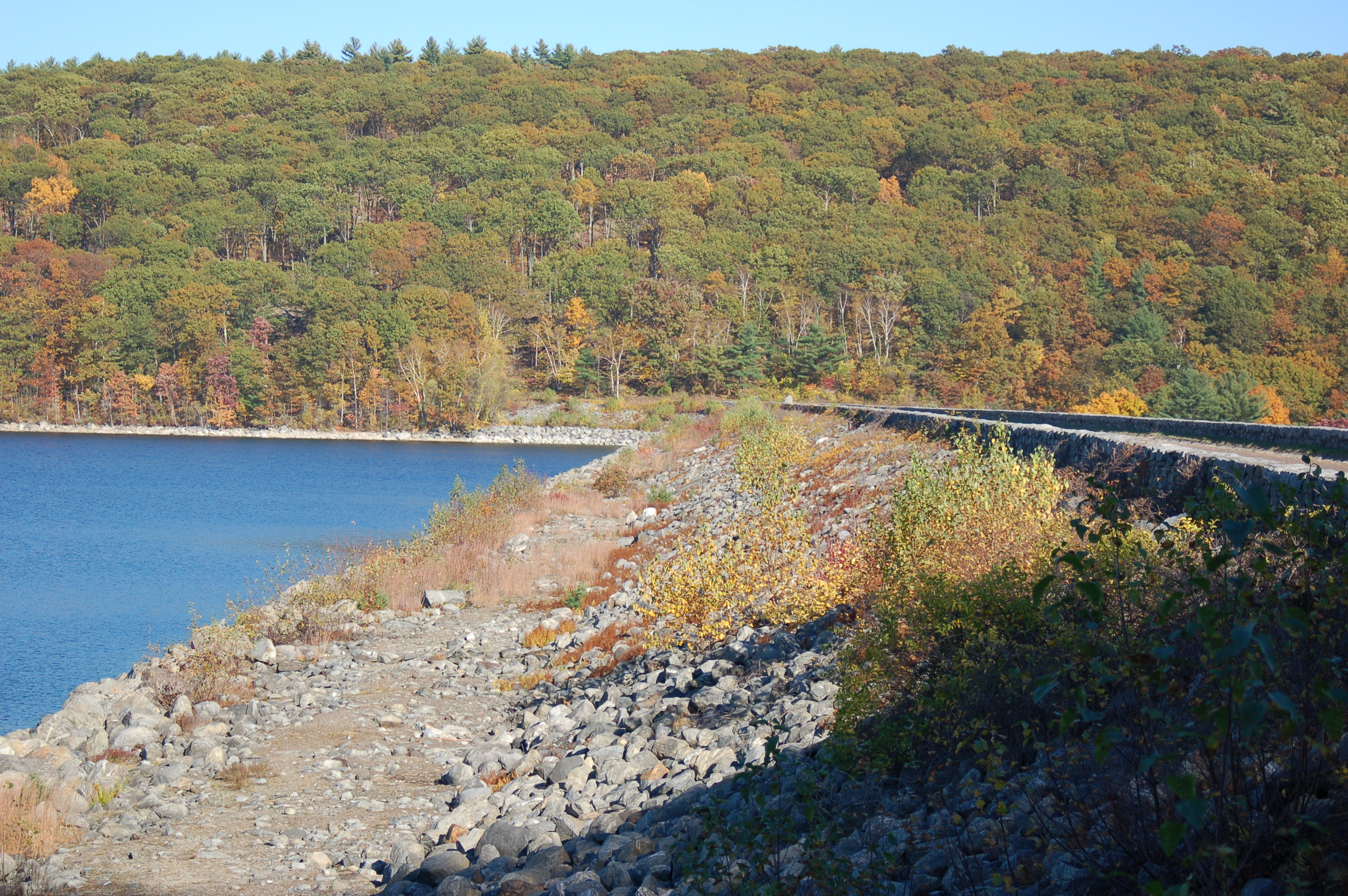
Goodnough Dike dam

X. Henry Goodnough, though he had no formal training as an engineer, became chief engineer for what was then called the Massachusetts State Board of Health. Later he became chief engineer of the Division of Sanitary Engineering of the new State Department of Public Health. He left there to form a business with Bayard F. Snow, a fellow of the American Society of Civil Engineers, under the name of X. Henry Goodnough, Incorporated, and did engineering consulting work. His passion for creating the Quabbin Reservoir began when he worked for the state and continued after he became chairman of the Metropolitan Water Board.

== Marriage and family ==
X. Henry Goodnough married Maria T. Dyer, a native of Boston.

== Death ==
X. Henry Goodnough died on August 10, 1935.
