= Lucy Winsor Killough =

American economist

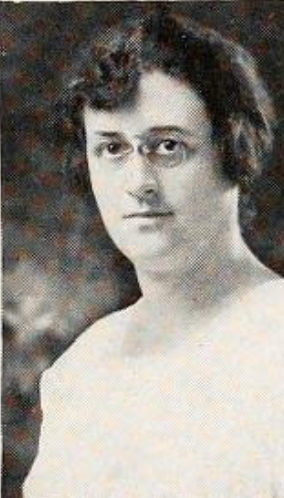
- Lucy Burton Winsor, later Killough, from the 1919 yearbook of Vassar College
- Born: Lucy Burton Winsor; April 16, 1897; Clinton, Massachusetts, U.S.
- Died: October 9, 1989 (age 92); Delray Beach, Florida, U.S.
- Occupation: Economist
- Father: Frank E. Winsor

Lucy Burton Winsor Killough (April 16, 1897 – October 9, 1989) was an American economist and professor. She taught in the economics department at Wellesley College from 1929 to 1962, and was co-author of several college textbooks.

== Early life and education ==
Winsor was born in Clinton, Massachusetts, the daughter of civil engineer Frank E. Winsor and Catherine Holbrook Burton Winsor. She graduated from Vassar College in 1919. She earned a master's thesis in economics at Stanford University in 1921, and completed doctoral studies in economics at Columbia University in 1925.

== Career ==
Killough joined the faculty at Wellesley College in 1929, became a full professor in 1947, and was chair of the economics department for seven years. She co-wrote several economics textbooks with her husband, Hugh B. Killough, who was the chair of the economics department at Brown University. Both Killoughs retired in 1962.

During and after World War II, from 1943 to 1947, Killough worked in Washington, D.C., as a statistician and analyst for the Foreign Economic Administration. She taught English in Taiwan in 1951, while her husband was a visiting economic advisor there. She was active in the American Association of University Women (AAUW). In retirement, she taught at Interamerican University of Puerto Rico, before moving to Stuart, Florida, in 1964.

== Publications ==
- Swindling in the Sale of Securities and the Blue Sky Law as a Remedy (1920)
- "The Tobacco Products Industry in New York and Its Environs: Present Trends and Probable Future Developments" (1924, Regional Plan of New York and Its Environs)
- "Price Making Forces in Cotton Markets" (1926, with Hugh B. Killough)
- "Chemical, metal, wood, tobacco and printing industries, present trends and probable future developments" (1928)
- Raw Materials of Industrialism (1929, textbook, with Hugh B. Killough)
- "Tax Exempt Industries in Rhode Island" (1940)
- Economics of International Trade (1948, textbook, with Hugh B. Killough)
- International Economics (1960, textbook, with Hugh B. Killough)

== Personal life ==
Winsor married fellow economist Hugh Baxter Killough in 1923; they had a daughter, Ann. Her husband died in 1976, and she died in 1989, at the age of 92, in Delray Beach, Florida.
