= Quabbin–Swift River Valley =

Region of Massachusetts, United States

Coordinates: 42.34°N 72.32°W

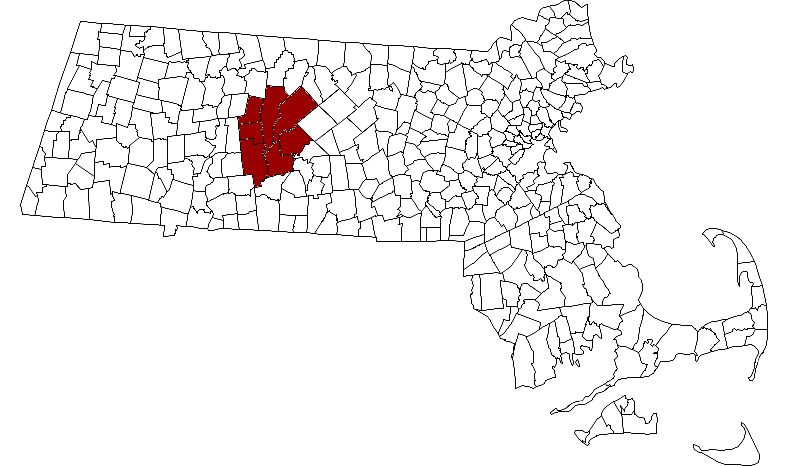
Seven towns of the Quabbin Valley. Parts of Palmer, immediately to the south, also lie within the Swift River Valley.

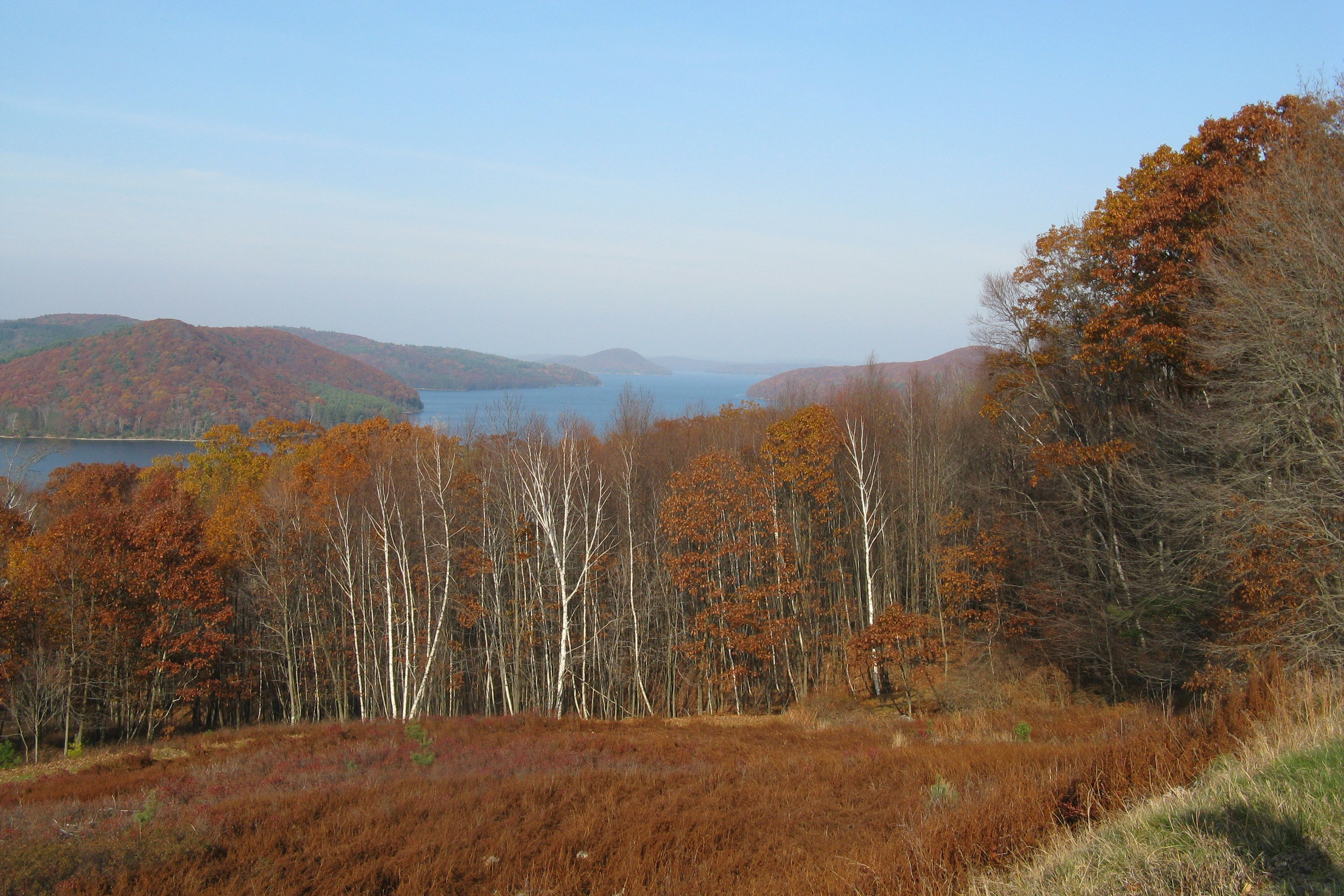
View from Quabbin Hill Road in Ware, overlooking where the former town of Enfield was submerged.

The Quabbin Valley is a region of Massachusetts in the United States. The region consists of the Quabbin Reservoir and accompanying river systems in Franklin, Hampden, Hampshire, and Worcester counties. The area is sometimes known as the Swift River Valley region, a reference to the Swift River, which was dammed to form the reservoir.

== Geography ==
At its most restrictive, the Quabbin–Swift River Valley includes the towns immediately bordering the reservoir and lower length of the river. These towns include Belchertown, Hardwick, New Salem, Pelham, Petersham, Shutesbury, Palmer, and Ware.

The name Quabbin has also been adopted by regional partnerships bordering the reservoir but not including the entire valley. For example, the Central Quabbin Area Tourism Association consists of Petersham and Hardwick on the reservoir's eastern side, as well as Barre, Hubbardston, New Braintree, North Brookfield, Oakham, and Rutland, further east. The North Quabbin Community Coalition includes Petersham and New Salem bordering the reservoir, and the adjoining towns of Athol, Orange, Erving, Phillipston, Royalston, Warwick and Wendell. The north Quabbin Chamber of Commerce includes 11 towns: Athol, Barre, Erving, Hardwick, New Salem, Orange, Petersham, Phillipston, Royalston, Warwick and Wendell

== Former towns ==
Upon the construction of the Quabbin Reservoir, four towns in the valley were officially disincorporated, their area absorbed by surrounding municipalities. These towns are Dana, Enfield, Greenwich, and Prescott.

Many people living in those towns fought unsuccessfully to prevent construction of the reservoir, arguing that it was unfair to move the Swift River Valley inhabitants to provide drinking water for Boston residents, and the movement has become a part of Western Massachusetts folklore.

== See also ==
- Swift River Reservation
