= Swift River (Ware River tributary) =

River in Massachusetts, United States

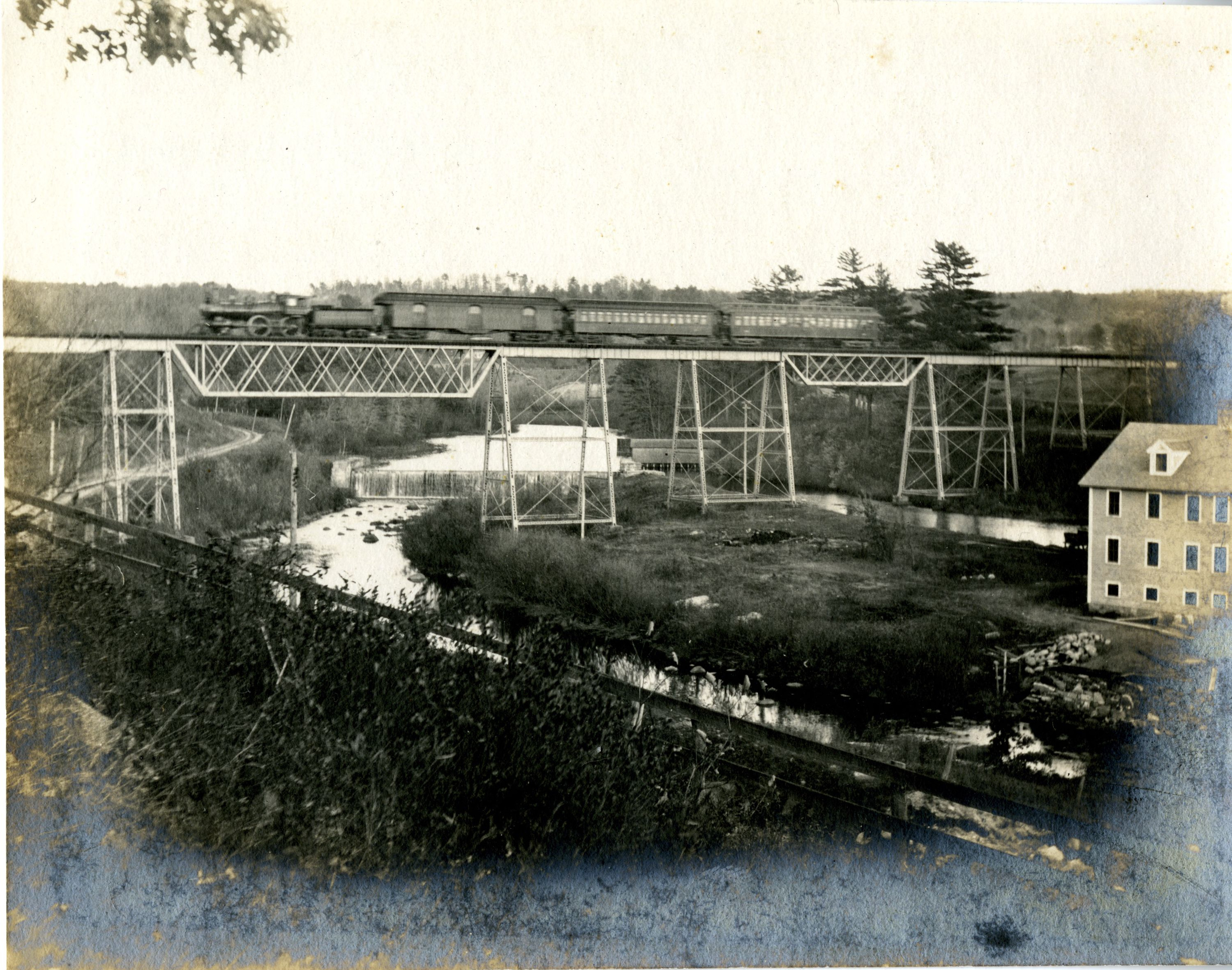
Train going over a trestle bridge above the Swift River in 1910

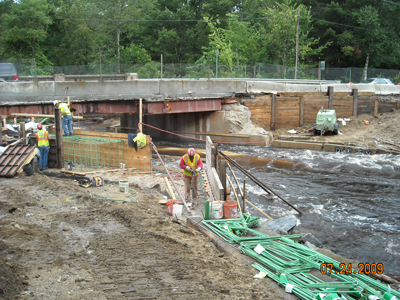
Construction of the Route 32 / Route 122 bridge over the Swift River in 2009 near Petersham, Massachusetts

The Swift River is a river in Massachusetts, United States. It has an east branch, a west branch, and a middle branch. It is a tributary of the Ware River. Part of it is dammed in the Swift River Valley to form the Quabbin Reservoir serving Boston and Eastern Massachusetts. Several towns were destroyed when the reservoir was constructed and filled.

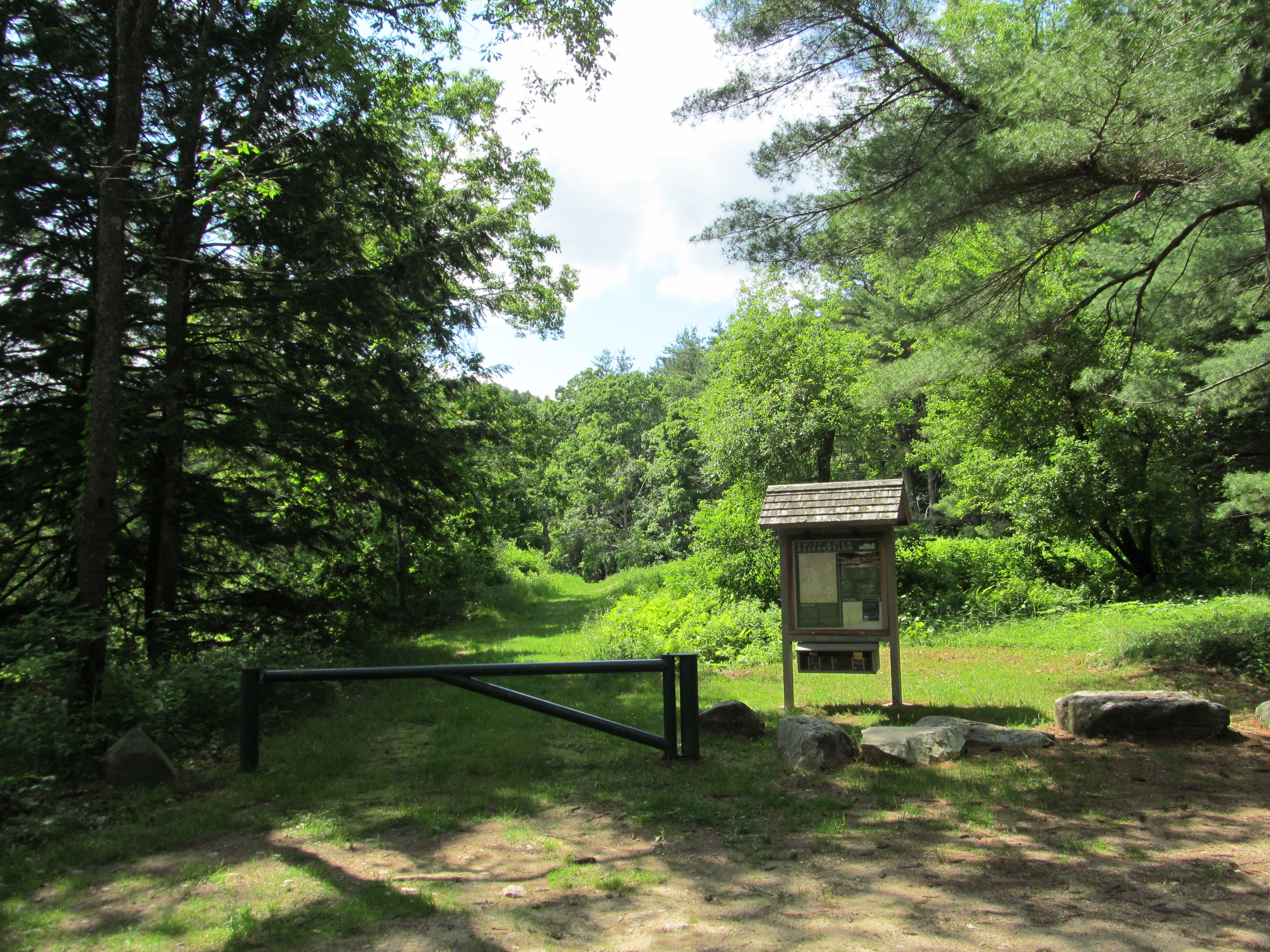
Swift River Reservation entrance

Swift River Reservation is located along the east branch.

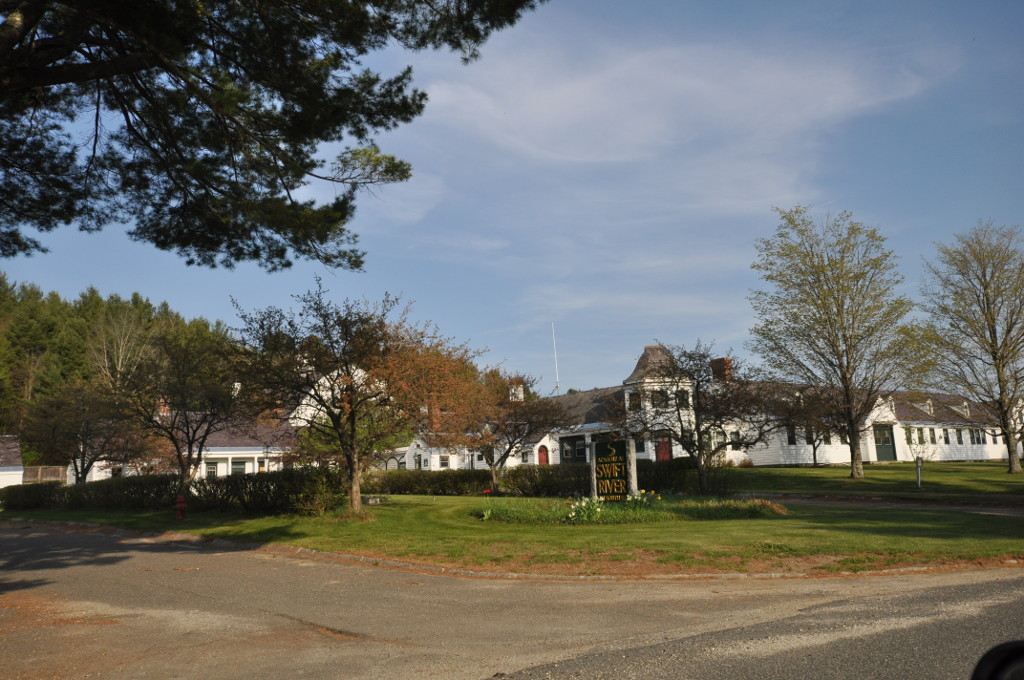
Swift River Academy buildings

The former Academy at Swift River was located in Plainfield, Massachusetts. It is now a drug addiction treatment facility.

Letting Swift River Go, a picture book by Jane Yolen with watercolor illustrations by Barbara Cooney, describes the flooding of the valley to create the reservoir.

== See also ==
- Quabbin Aqueduct
