= Prescott, Massachusetts =

- Town
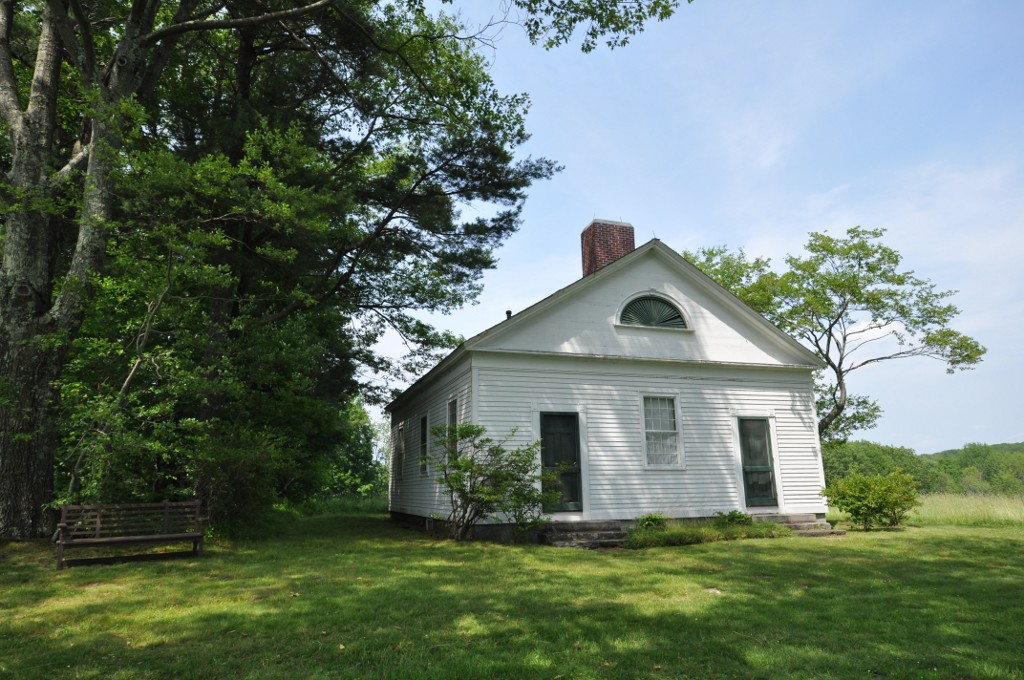
- "Old Prescott Town Hall"
- Interactive map of Prescott, Massachusetts
- Coordinates: 42°23′30″N 72°20′41″W
- Country: United States
- State: Massachusetts
- County: Hampshire
- Incorporated: 1822
- Disincorporated: April 28, 1938
- Time zone: UTC-5 (Eastern)
  - Summer (DST): Eastern

Prescott was a town in Hampshire County, Massachusetts, United States. It was incorporated in 1822 from portions of Pelham and New Salem, and was partially built on Equivalent Lands. It was named in honor of Colonel William Prescott, who commanded the American forces at the Battle of Bunker Hill. It was disincorporated on April 28, 1938, as part of the creation of the Quabbin Reservoir. It was the least populous of the four unincorporated towns, with barely 300 residents by 1900. Upon dissolution, portions of the town were annexed to the adjacent towns of New Salem and Petersham. The majority of the former town (the New Salem portion) is still above water, and is known as the Prescott Peninsula. The public is not allowed on the peninsula except for an annual tour given by the Swift River Valley Historical Society, or for hikes conducted by the Society. None of the land is in Hampshire County any longer; the New Salem portion is in Franklin County; and the Petersham portion is in Worcester County.

As with the nearby town of Dana, after the dissolution of incorporation, houses were moved or razed, but cellar holes remained. The Prescott First Congregational Church, located in the village of Prescott Four Corners, was moved to South Hadley and is now the home of the Joseph Allen Skinner Museum.

The former site of Prescott Center was home to the Five College Radio Astronomy Observatory from 1969 to 2011.

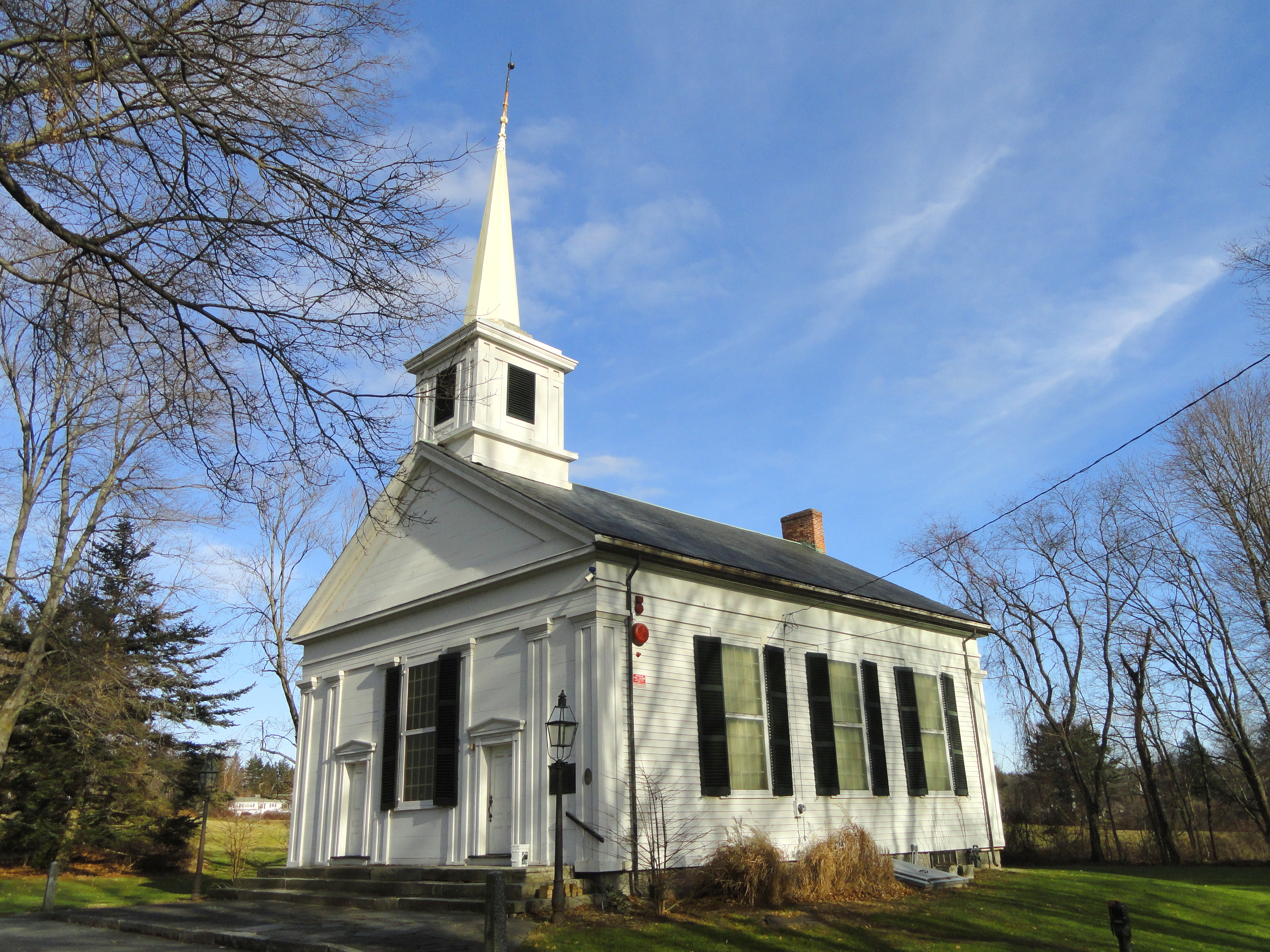
The former First Congregational Church of Prescott; built in 1846, it was purchased by silk magnate Joseph Skinner who moved it to South Hadley in 1930; it now houses the Joseph Allen Skinner Museum

Daniel Shays, leader of the 1787 rebellion which bears his name, was a resident of that part of Pelham which later became the southern part of Prescott. The site of his former home is still above water; but the house was gone by 1927, and in any event the site is inaccessible to the general public. The Conkey Tavern, located roughly to the west of the Shays site, was where the Shays Rebellion was largely planned. Its site is now under water.

The Atkinson Tavern, once the centerpiece of the small village of Atkinson Hollow, stands today, renovated and expanded, in West Springfield, Massachusetts as the Storrowton Tavern, on the grounds owned by the Eastern States Exposition. The former Town Hall, once located just south of Atkinson Hollow, is inaccessible to the general public, and stands today off of Route 32 in Petersham.

The village of North Prescott, on the border between Prescott and New Salem, remains partially open to public access. Although the site of the North Prescott Methodist Episcopal Church is vacant, the former parsonage—now a private home which is not open to the public—remains on its original site. The church building itself is now the home of the Swift River Valley Historical Society in North New Salem, where it was moved in 1985. Prior to this the church stood at its site on the New Salem line until 1949, when it was initially moved to Orange as home of the former Prescott Historical Society. A few other structures remain.

Prescott House, an on-campus living facility at Hampshire College(closed in 2026) in Amherst, Massachusetts, is named after the former town.

== Photos ==
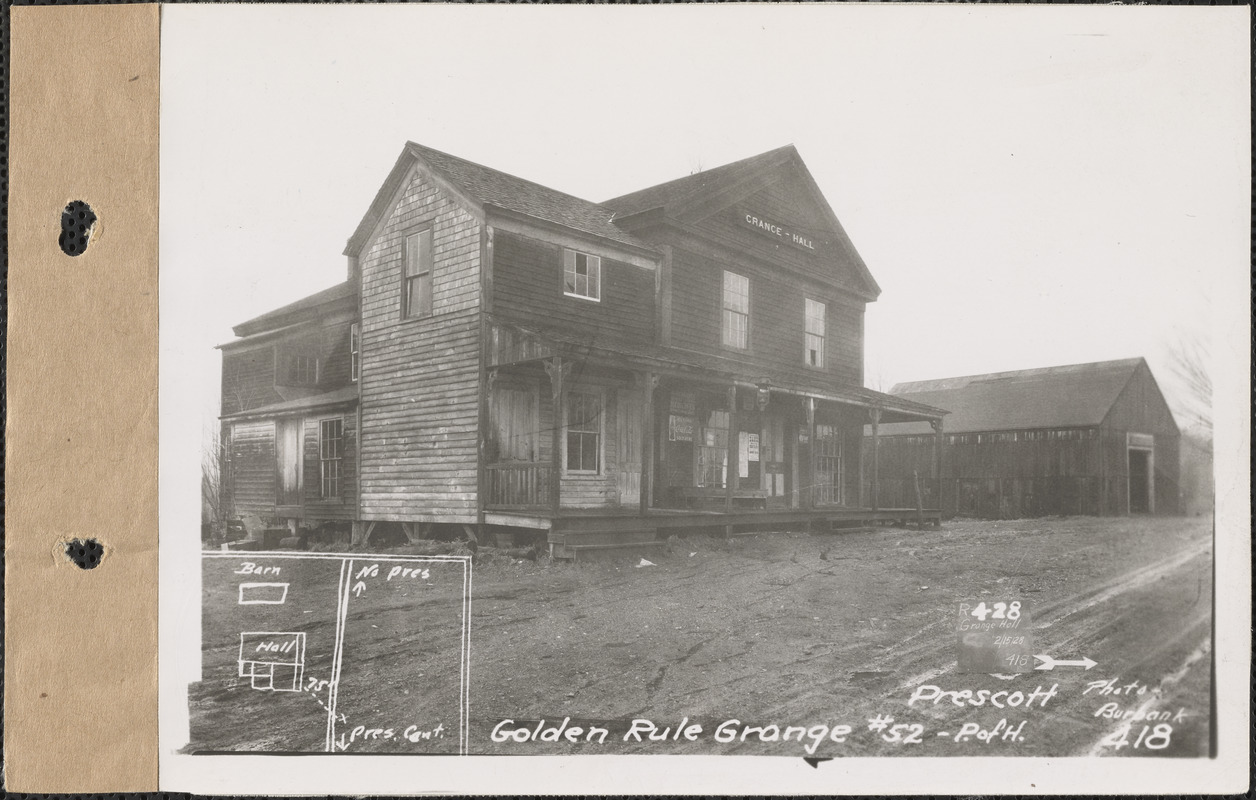
Grange Hall in February 1928

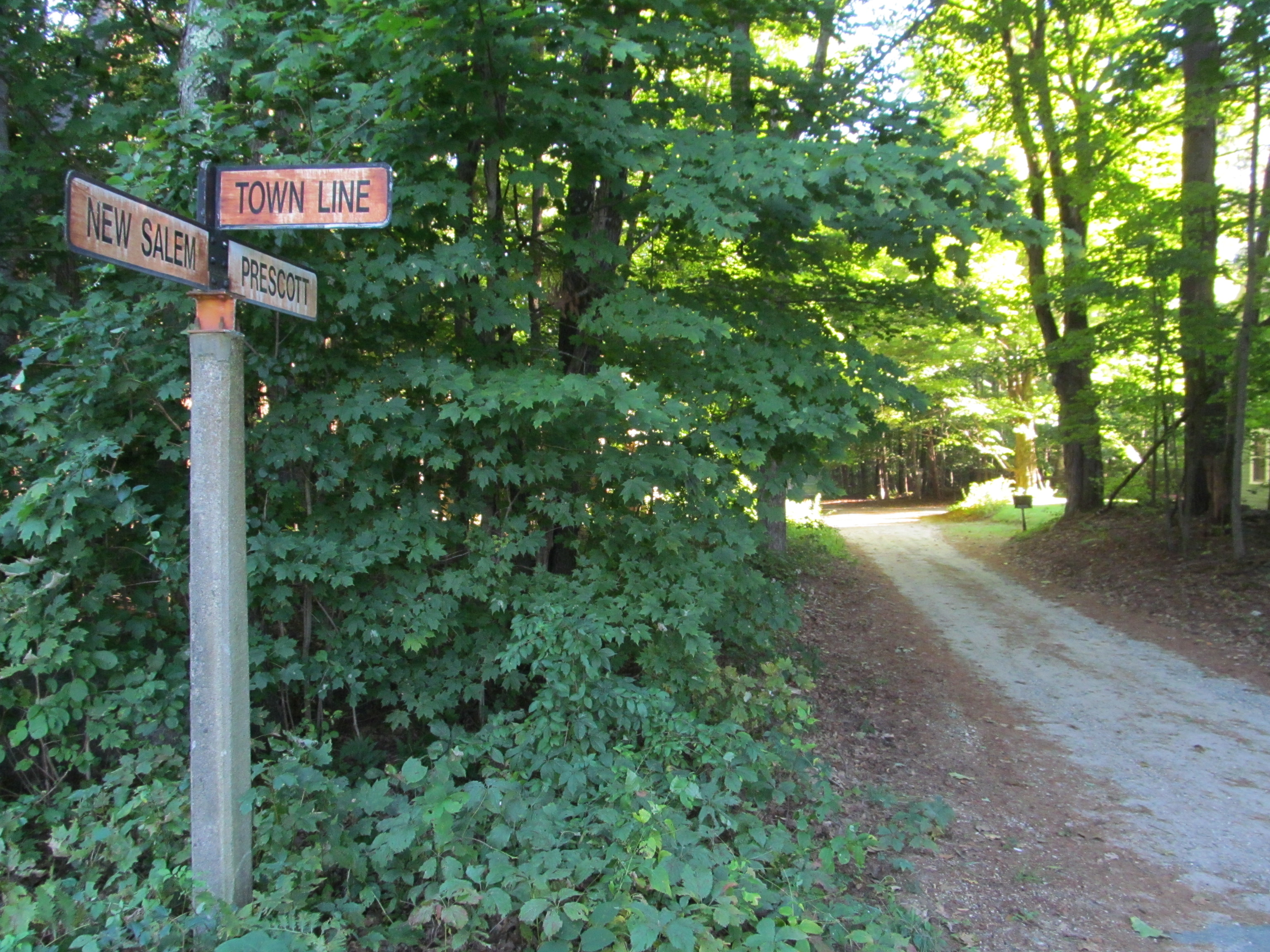
Old town line sign between New Salem and Prescott

== Other Quabbin towns ==
- Greenwich
- Enfield
- Dana
