= Quabbin Reservoir =

Massachusetts reservoir which serves the Boston area

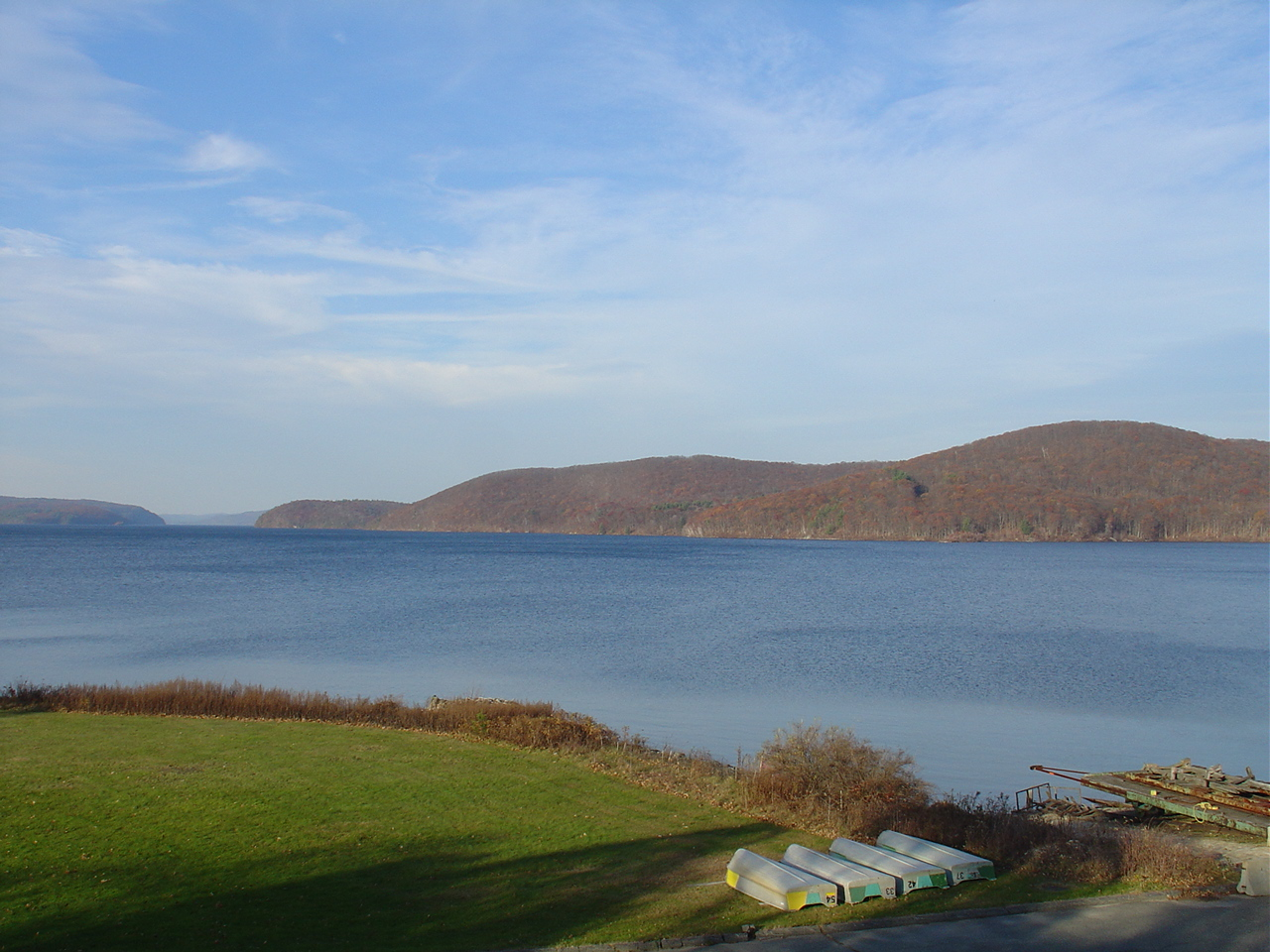
- November 2005

- Location within Massachusetts Location within the United States
- Location: Massachusetts, US
- Coordinates: 42°21′33″N 72°18′00″W
- Lake type: Reservoir
- Primary inflows: Swift River
- Primary outflows: Swift River
- Basin countries: United States
- Max. length: 18 miles (29 km)
- Surface area: 38.6 mi^{2} (100 km^{2})
- Average depth: 51 ft (16 m)
- Max. depth: 151 ft (46 m)
- Water volume: 412,000,000,000 US gal (1,260,000 acre⋅ft; 1.56 km^{3})
- Shore length^{1}: 181 mi (291 km)
- Surface elevation: 522 ft (159 m)
- Settlements: Belchertown, Petersham, Hardwick, Ware, New Salem, Shutesbury, Pelham
- ^{1} Shore length is not a well-defined measure.

Quabbin Reservoir is the largest inland body of water in Massachusetts. Along with Wachusett Reservoir, it is the primary water supply for Boston, 65 miles (105 km) to the east, and 40 other cities and towns in Greater Boston. The Quabbin also supplies water to three towns west of the reservoir and serves as a backup supply for three others. By 1989, it supplied water for 2.5 million people, about 40% of the state's population at the time. It has an aggregate capacity of 412 billion US gallons (1,260,000 acre⋅ft; 1.56 km^{3}) and an area of 38.6 square miles (100 km^{2}).

Quabbin Reservoir is formed by the flooding of the Swift River Valley behind Winsor Dam and Goodnough Dike. The two structures were built between 1930 and 1939, though the reservoir took until 1946 to fill to capacity. The 25-mile (40 km) Quabbin Aqueduct carries water from Quabbin Reservoir directly to Wachusett Reservoir, diverting it out of the Connecticut River watershed.

The construction of Quabbin was subject to intense controversy, as it required the displacement of 2,500 people and the flooding of four towns: Dana, Enfield, Greenwich, and Prescott.

== Structures and water flow ==
Quabbin Reservoir water flows to the Wachusett Reservoir through the Quabbin Aqueduct. The Quabbin watershed is managed by the Massachusetts Department of Conservation and Recreation, while the water supply system is operated by the Massachusetts Water Resources Authority. The Winsor Dam and the Goodnough Dike form the reservoir from impoundments of the three branches of the Swift River. The Quabbin Reservoir is part of the Chicopee River Watershed, which in turn feeds the Connecticut River.

The Quabbin Spillway, which follows part of Quabbin Hill Road in Belchertown, allows water to bypass the Winsor Dam and join the Swift River when the reservoir is full.

In 1947, the Massachusetts Legislature authorized the construction of the Chicopee Valley Aqueduct to deliver Quabbin water to three communities in Western Massachusetts: Chicopee, South Hadley, and Wilbraham. In 1951, with the Quabbin-Wachusett system sufficient to meet foreseeable needs, the Cochituate Aqueduct was abandoned, and the Framingham Reservoir system was placed on emergency stand-by. The present Lake Cochituate is the so-called Framingham Reservoir and now serves as a major swimming and boating resource but is no longer part of the potable water supply.

== History ==
=== Demand for water exceeds local supplies ===
Metropolitan Boston's demands for fresh water began to outstrip its local supplies in the early part of the nineteenth century. Many possible sources of water were explored, including groundwater and rivers, but none were considered adequate in quantity and cleanliness to meet the needs of the rapidly growing city. In 1848, after several years of controversy, the Massachusetts General Court (the official name of the state legislature) authorized the construction of the Cochituate Aqueduct to bring water to Boston from Lake Cochituate in Wayland and Natick.

This established three important policies, which remain in force today:

1. Public, rather than private, ownership of the public water supply system.
2. Use of upland reservoirs, with gravity-fed rather than pumped supply systems.
3. Watershed protection, rather than filtration, as the primary mechanism of ensuring wholesome supplies.

By 1875, with demand again on the verge of exceeding supply, the Boston Water Board was established to take over the operations of the Cochituate Water Board, construct five new reservoirs on the Sudbury River in Framingham, Massachusetts, and a new Sudbury Aqueduct to deliver that water to the city, which was completed in 1878.

=== Recommendation for establishment and related construction ===
In 1893, the Massachusetts Board of Health issued a report analyzing population and water-use trends, and recommended the creation of a Metropolitan Water District, serving several suburban communities in addition to Boston, and the construction of two new reservoirs: one on the Nashua River northeast of Worcester, and one in the Swift River Valley.

The General Court acted to establish the Metropolitan Water District, including 26 communities within ten miles (16 km) of the Massachusetts State House, later in 1895. The Wachusett Reservoir was completed in 1908. The Board of Health study had anticipated that Swift River water would be required by 1915, but this prediction had proven overly pessimistic. The introduction of mandatory water metering in Water District communities, and other efforts to reduce waste and inefficient uses, made it possible to delay construction of new water sources until the 1930s.

Frank E. Winsor was chief engineer for the Metropolitan Water District from 1926 until his death in 1939. He was closely involved in the design and construction of Winsor Dam, Goodnough Dike and the Quabbin Reservoir. Winsor Dam is named for him. He had previously been chief engineer for the building of the Scituate Reservoir in Rhode Island.

A 1922 study officially endorsed the Swift River Valley as the next extension of the water system and created the Metropolitan District Commission (MDC), from which the Massachusetts Water Resources Authority (MWRA) was split off in 1985, to oversee the construction and maintain the system after its completion. In 1926, the Ware River Act was passed, starting construction on the first stage of the project, a 12-mile long tunnel connecting Wachusett Reservoir with the Ware River. This is called the Ware River Diversion. During the 1930s, this tunnel was extended to the Swift River. The complete tunnel is now known as the Quabbin Aqueduct.

=== Opposition ===
Although the project was enthusiastically supported by lawmakers in the Boston area, it was opposed by residents of the affected towns. The state of Connecticut sued Massachusetts, claiming waters that were rightfully meant to flow into the Connecticut River, and subsequently through their state, were being illegally diverted. The lawsuit was unsuccessful, but Massachusetts was still bound by discharge minimums set under the regulatory authority of the Secretary of War over navigable waters. Specifically, the Swift River needed to maintain a 20 million gallon per day flow downriver from the dam.

=== Reservoir formed ===
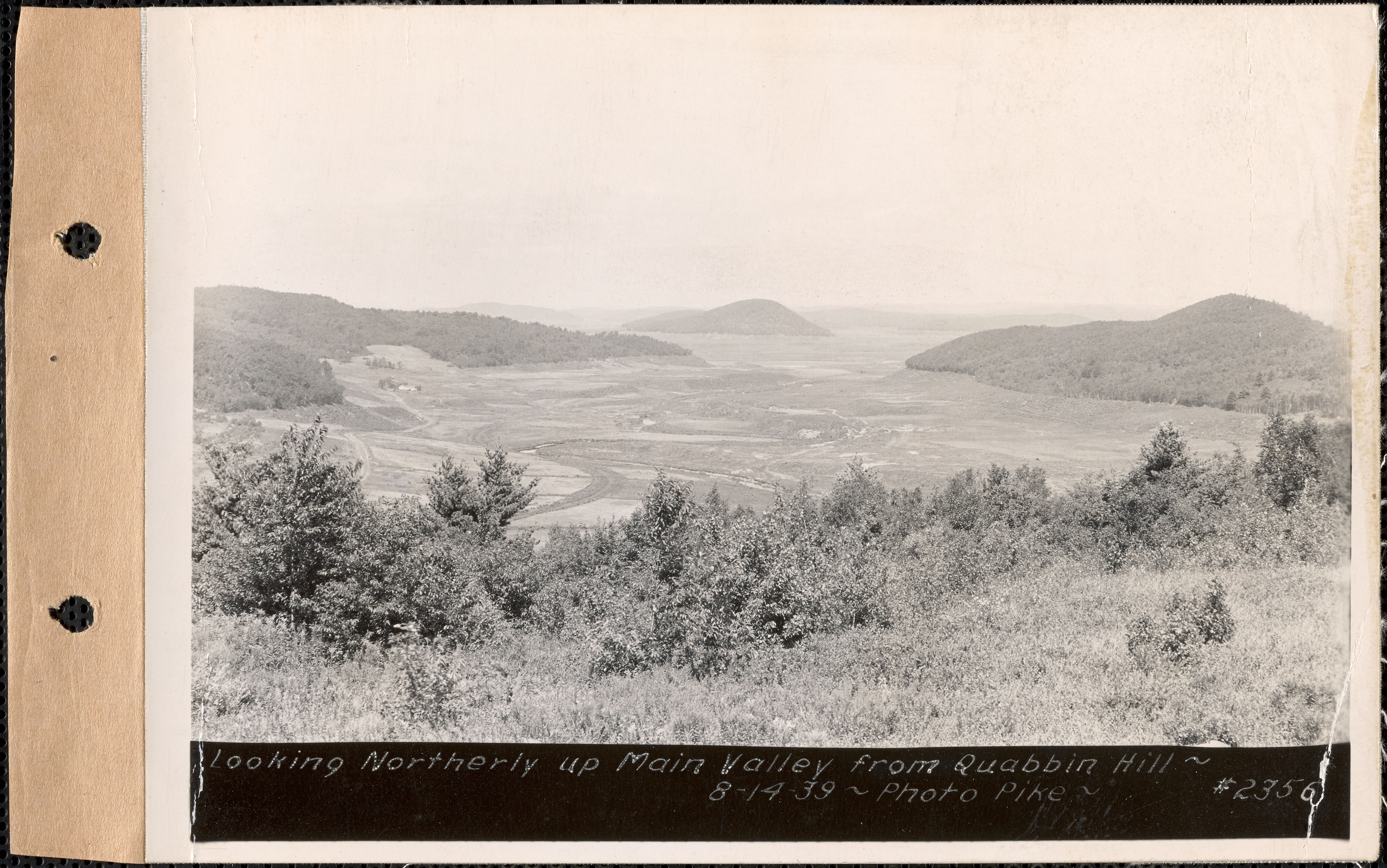
Looking northerly up main valley from Quabbin Hill, Quabbin Reservoir, Mass., Aug. 14, 1939.

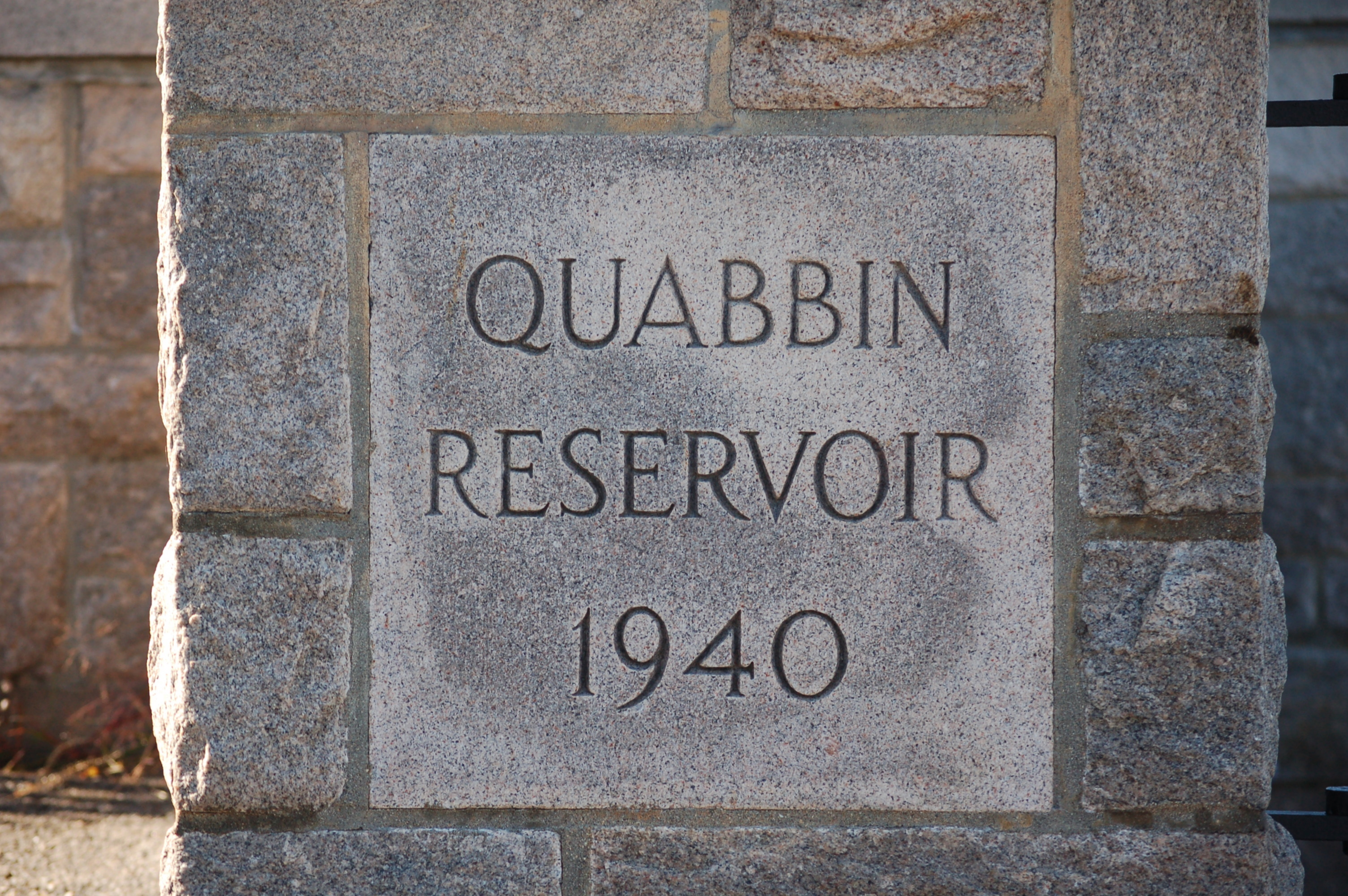

Before the reservoir's construction, there was a hill in Enfield called Quabbin Hill and a lake in Greenwich called Quabbin Lake. These were from the Nipmuc word meaning "place of many waters" or "meeting of many waters", and became the basis for naming the new reservoir. The Quabbin was formed by inundating the Swift River Valley, a drainage basin lying entirely within the state, by damming the river and a col, through which Beaver Brook would have otherwise provided another outlet for its water. When construction on the dam began in the mid-1930s, the Swift River was redirected from its riverbed through a diversion tunnel. On August 14, 1939, that tunnel was sealed with rock. Over the next seven years, the waters of the Quabbin Reservoir slowly rose behind the newly completed Winsor Dam, an earth-filled structure 2,640 feet (800 m) long, rising 170 feet (52 m) above the riverbed, and the slightly smaller Goodnough Dike. The water gradually submerged the roads that had linked the towns. It swallowed all but the peaks of about 60 hills and mountains, transforming Prescott Ridge into Prescott Peninsula. The Quabbin Reservoir was full, for the first time, in June 1946.

In 1941, the land that would become the Prescott Peninsula became the Quabbin Reservoir Precision Bombing and Gunnery Range. The range was used by Army Air Forces and later US Air Force planes from both Hanscom Army Air Field and Westover Army Air Field from 1941 through 1951. It was also used for practice landings. In the late 2000s the site was surveyed by state authorities and the federal Formerly Used Defense Sites program for potential unexploded ordnance or other contamination in the area.

=== Towns disincorporated ===
The Quabbin's creation required the flooding, and thus the disincorporation, of four towns in April 1938: Dana (located in Worcester County), Enfield, Greenwich, and Prescott (all located in Hampshire County). The land remaining from the disincorporated towns was added to surrounding municipalities, including Belchertown, Pelham, New Salem, Petersham, Hardwick and Ware. One additional town on the reservoir is Shutesbury, in Franklin County. Because of New Salem's annexation of the Prescott Peninsula, a large wedge of land shifted from Hampshire County to Franklin County. Today, the majority of the reservoir lies in either New Salem or Petersham.

Of the land used to make the dam, about 60,000 acres were purchased and the rest was seized by eminent domain in 1938. The town of Dana voted to voluntarily give up their land to the project. Around 2,500 residents lost their homes as part of the flooding.

In addition, thirty-six miles of the Boston and Albany Railroad's Athol Branch, the so-called "Rabbit Line", were abandoned (originally the Springfield, Athol and Northeastern Railroad). Route 21, formerly reaching Athol, was truncated to the south side of the reservoir, and new roads—now US 202 and Route 32A—were built, respectively, on the western and eastern side of the reservoir. The designation of Route 109 was removed in 1933 from the road once running from Pittsfield to West Brookfield and leading into Enfield Centre from the southeast; and a different road southwest of Boston received that designation.

The buildings in the towns flooded by the reservoir were removed. Some cellar holes were left intact while others, chiefly in Prescott and below the flow line, were filled in. Old roads that once led to the flooded towns can be followed to the water's edge. Not all elements of the towns were destroyed, however. Town memorials and cemeteries in the four towns were moved to Quabbin Park Cemetery, located on Route 9 in Ware, just off the Quabbin's lands. Many other public buildings were moved intact to other locations. For example, the Prescott First Congregational Church was moved to South Hadley. The North Prescott Methodist Episcopal Church was moved to Orange in 1949, and then to New Salem in 1985 where it forms part of the building complex of the Swift River Valley Historical Society. The former Town Hall of Prescott now sits off of Route 32 in Petersham. Atkinson Tavern was moved from Prescott to the Storrowton Village Museum on the grounds of the Eastern States Exposition in West Springfield, where it now serves as part of the operating Storrowton Tavern restaurant.

Three student housing facilities at Hampshire College in Amherst are named after the discontinued towns of Greenwich, Prescott, and Enfield. In addition, Hampshire College named another facility on its campus Dana House, after the other discontinued town of Dana.

Four residence halls at the nearby Eagle Hill School are also named for the four towns: Greenwich, Prescott, Dana, and Enfield.

== Watershed public access and recreation ==
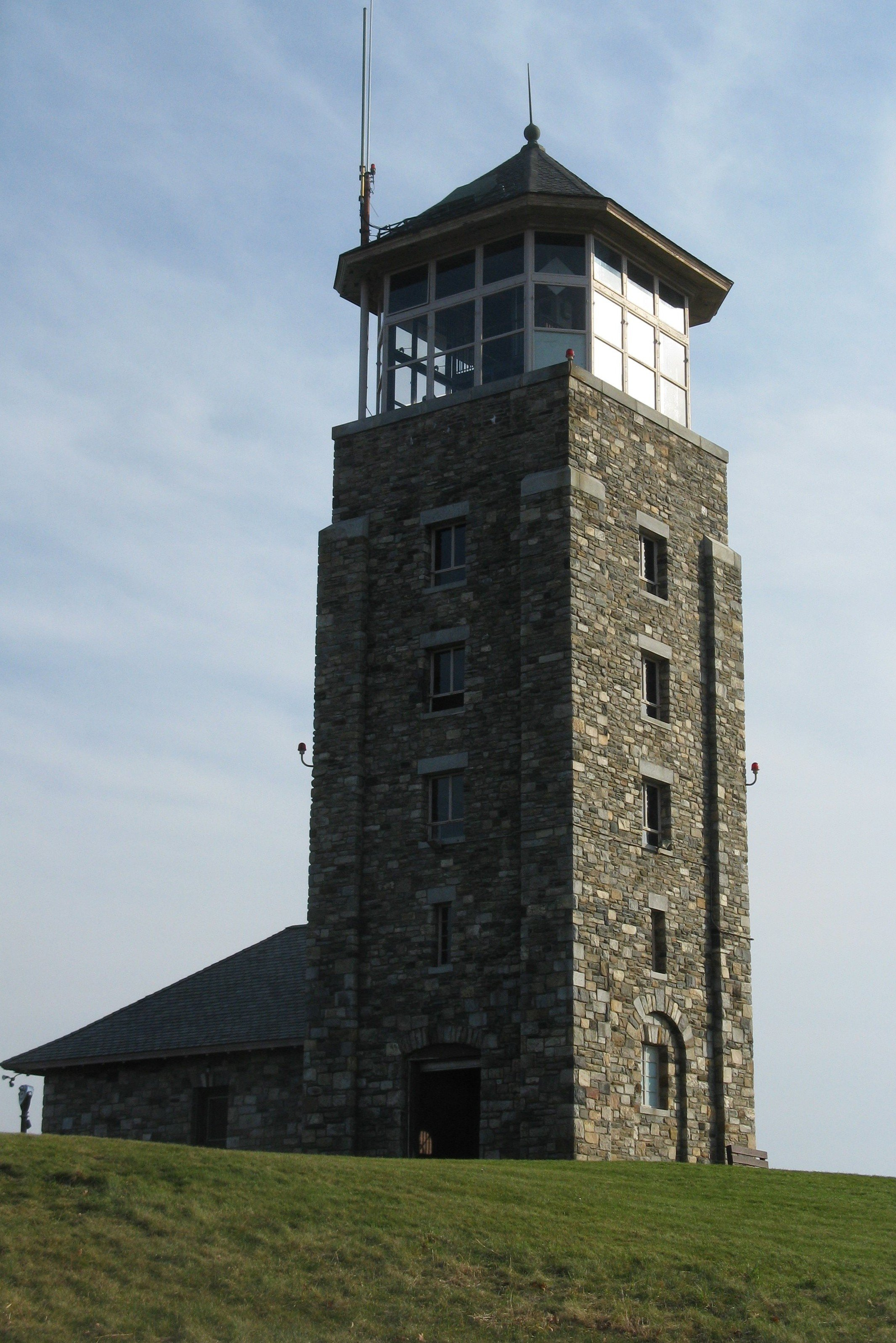
The Enfield Lookout observation tower in Ware, MA.

To protect the water supply from the threats from unrestricted motorized vehicle use, most areas around the reservoir are publicly accessible only by foot, with limited parking available at some of the surrounding gates.

Large portions of Dana are on higher ground, and its remains, predominantly cellar holes, as well as the former town center (where a historic stone marker was placed) can be visited.

Much of Prescott is above water on what is now known as the Prescott Peninsula. However, Prescott cannot be visited most of the year due to state restrictions, although there is an annual tour of the town conducted by the Swift River Valley Historical Society. A few houses and roads exist which were once part of North Prescott (now New Salem), and there is a town line marker just north of the gates, indicating the former town line for Prescott. Cellar holes have been filled near the center of what was once Prescott to accommodate the former Five College Radio Astronomy Observatory, once operated by the University of Massachusetts Amherst.

There is a visitor center south of the reservoir, as well as an observation tower, and Enfield Lookout. This area—called Quabbin Park—is accessible by car from the south using State Route 9. The Park is a popular spot for hiking and other outdoor activities. This area was formerly part of the town of Enfield, which was annexed by Belchertown.

Fishing is allowed in designated areas in the northern portions of the reservoir. Three boat launch areas are available, and to prevent spread of aquatic invasive species private boats must be cleaned before being permitted on the Reservoir. DCR provides a number of rental boats as well. Current Massachusetts state record lake trout (25 lb 7 oz) and walleye (11 lb 0 oz) were caught in the Quabbin.

More complete information regarding access rules and maps of Quabbin can be found on DCR's official public access website.

=== Natural resources and forest management ===
This large block of forested land supports a great diversity of wildlife, and has been the focus for the re-establishment of several species in Massachusetts. Bald eagles, loons, moose, deer, coyotes, black bears, foxes, and bobcats share the habitat, among others. A proposed plan to establish a colony of endangered timber rattlesnakes to Mount Zion Island on the Quabbin was suspended indefinitely in 2017 after public opposition.

== Popular culture ==
- H. P. Lovecraft's story "The Colour Out of Space" is set in the valley before it was flooded for the reservoir. His fictional town of Dunwich in "The Dunwich Horror", written in 1928, is partially based on the town of Greenwich (before reservoir plans were made).
- William Weld's novel Stillwater is set in the valley while the reservoir is under construction. Weld relocates the already fictional Massachusetts town of Ripton, MA from the Berkshires to the Quabbin as a fifth flooded town.
- Both the film Dreamcatcher and the Stephen King novel upon which it was based have scenes set at the Quabbin Reservoir.
- In Jane Langton's mystery novel Emily Dickinson Is Dead, the drowned villages and the reservoir have a dark role to play.
- Jane Yolen's picture book Letting Swift River Go is about the creation of the Quabbin Reservoir from the perspective of a young girl who grew up in the valley.
- During his 2020 Massachusetts Democratic primary campaign for U.S. Senate, former U.S. Representative Joe Kennedy III accused his rival, Sen. Ed Markey, of ignoring the towns of Dana, Prescott, and Enfield, which were disincorporated more than eighty years earlier.
- The Puma Blues, a black and white comic book series by Stephen Murphy and Michael Zulli, takes place in an alternate early 21st century and involves a colony of flying manta rays living within the freshwater reservoir.
- Heather Graham Pozzessere's book Dark Rites, from her Krewe of Hunters series, takes place largely around the reservoir.
- Derek B. Miller's book How to Find Your Way in the Dark includes mention of the flooding that eliminated the drowned villages.
- In the film Mother/Android, the Quabbin Reservoir is mentioned several times as the characters navigate through a post-apocalyptic Massachusetts.

== See also ==
- Nichewaug, Massachusetts
- Quabbin Valley
- Scituate Reservoir—A reservoir that supplies water to a large portion of neighboring Rhode Island
