= Greenwich, Massachusetts =

- Town
- Interactive map of Greenwich, Massachusetts
- Coordinates: 42°21′33″N 72°17′47″W
- Country: United States
- State: Massachusetts
- County: Hampshire
- Incorporated: 1754
- Disincorporated: April 28, 1938
- Time zone: UTC-5 (Eastern)
  - Summer (DST): Eastern

Greenwich (/ˈɡriːnwɪtʃ/) was a town in Hampshire County, Massachusetts, United States. The town was disincorporated by the Commonwealth of Massachusetts in 1938 for the construction of the Quabbin Reservoir which was constructed to supply water to the metropolitan Boston area.

== History ==
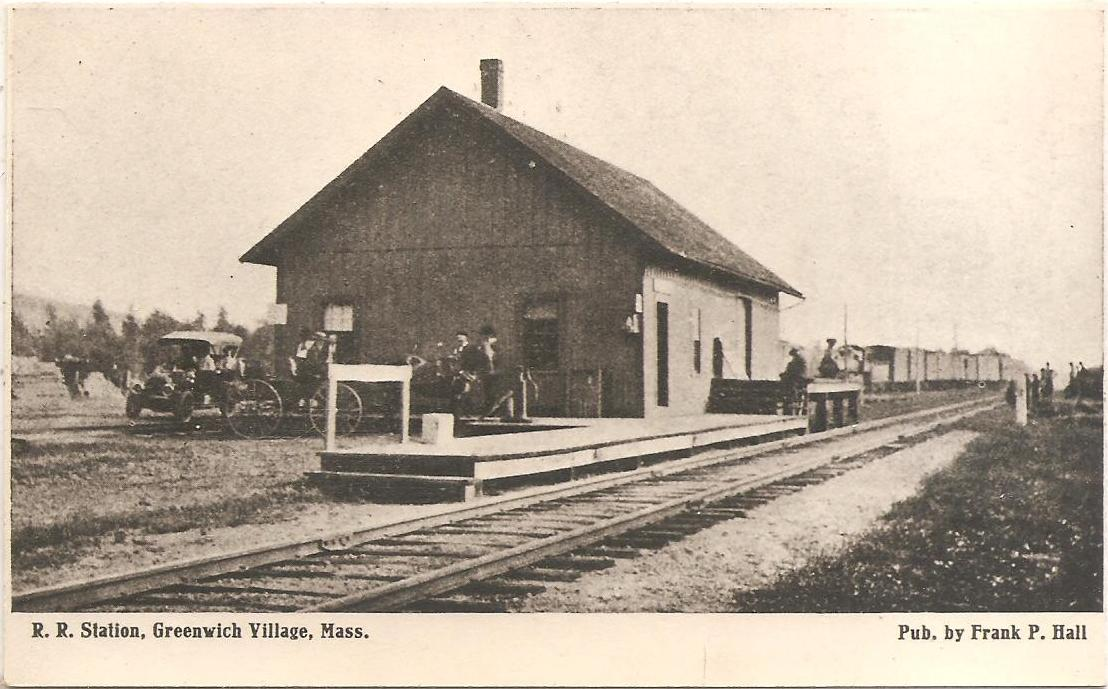
Early-1900s postcard of Greenwich Village train station

Greenwich was established in 1739 as Quabbin, incorporated as Quabbin Parish in 1754, and became the town of Greenwich (named for John Campbell, Duke of Greenwich) in 1754. It was located along the East and Middle branches of the Swift River. The Athol Branch of the Boston and Albany Railroad ran through the center of town, as did Route 21. It was well known for its lakes and ponds, which were popular vacation spots. It bordered four towns—Enfield, Prescott, Dana, and Hardwick.

H. P. Lovecraft's fictional town of Dunwich in his seminal story "The Dunwich Horror" was partially based on the town of Greenwich. Additionally, Lovecraft's story "The Colour Out of Space" is set in this valley before it was flooded for the reservoir.

Greenwich was disincorporated on April 28, 1938, as part of the creation of the Quabbin Reservoir. Upon disincorporation, portions of the town were annexed to the adjacent towns of Hardwick, New Salem, Petersham, and Ware. (Because of the redrawing of town lines, the land is no longer completely in Hampshire County; only the portion located in Ware is.) Because most of Greenwich was at a lower elevation than the surrounding towns, it is now largely submerged, except for the hilltops of Curtis Hill, Mount Lizzie, and Mount Pomeroy, which are now islands.

Historical population
Year	Pop.	±%
1790	1,045	—

== Photos ==
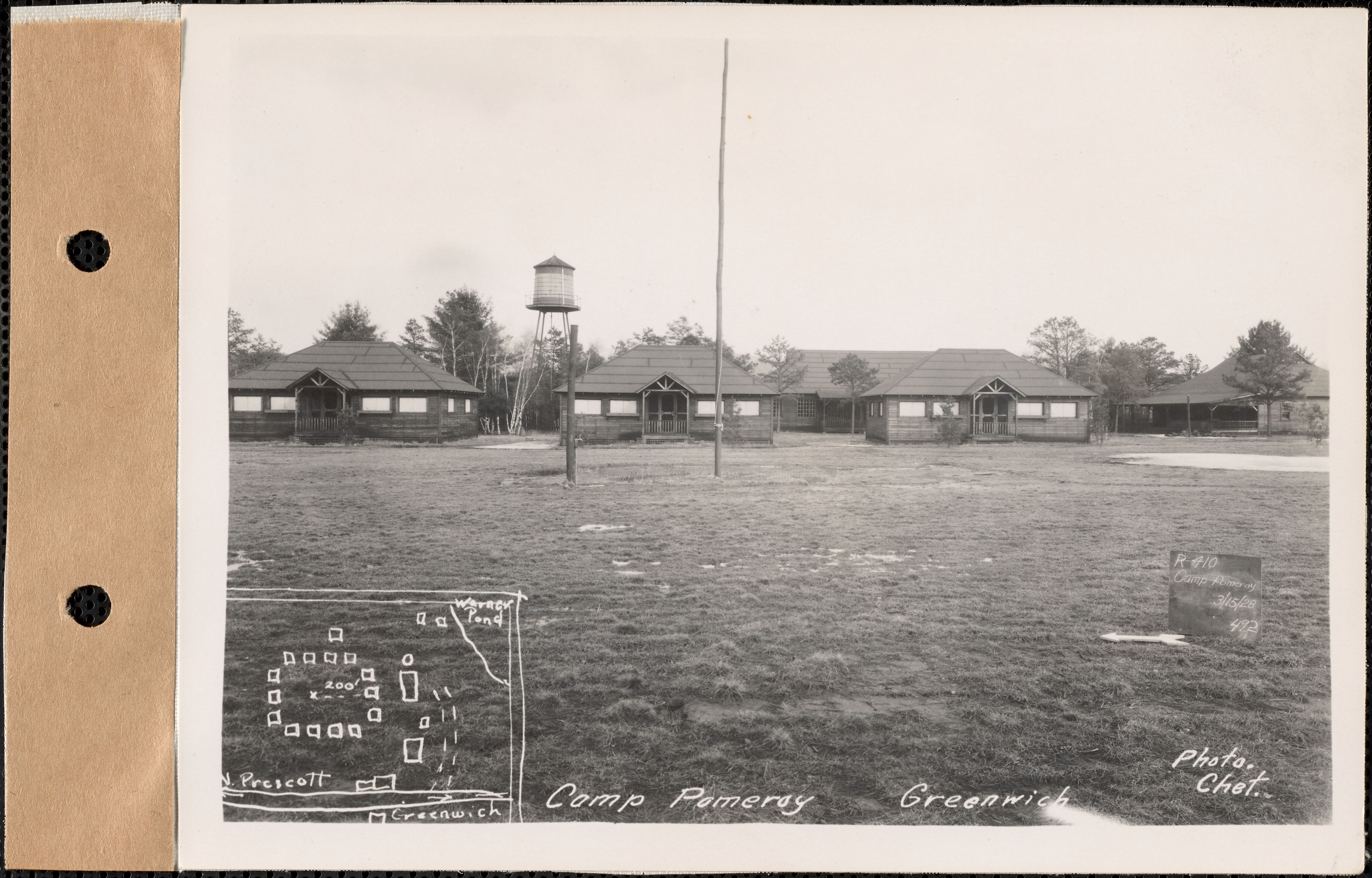
Camp Pomeroy in March 1928

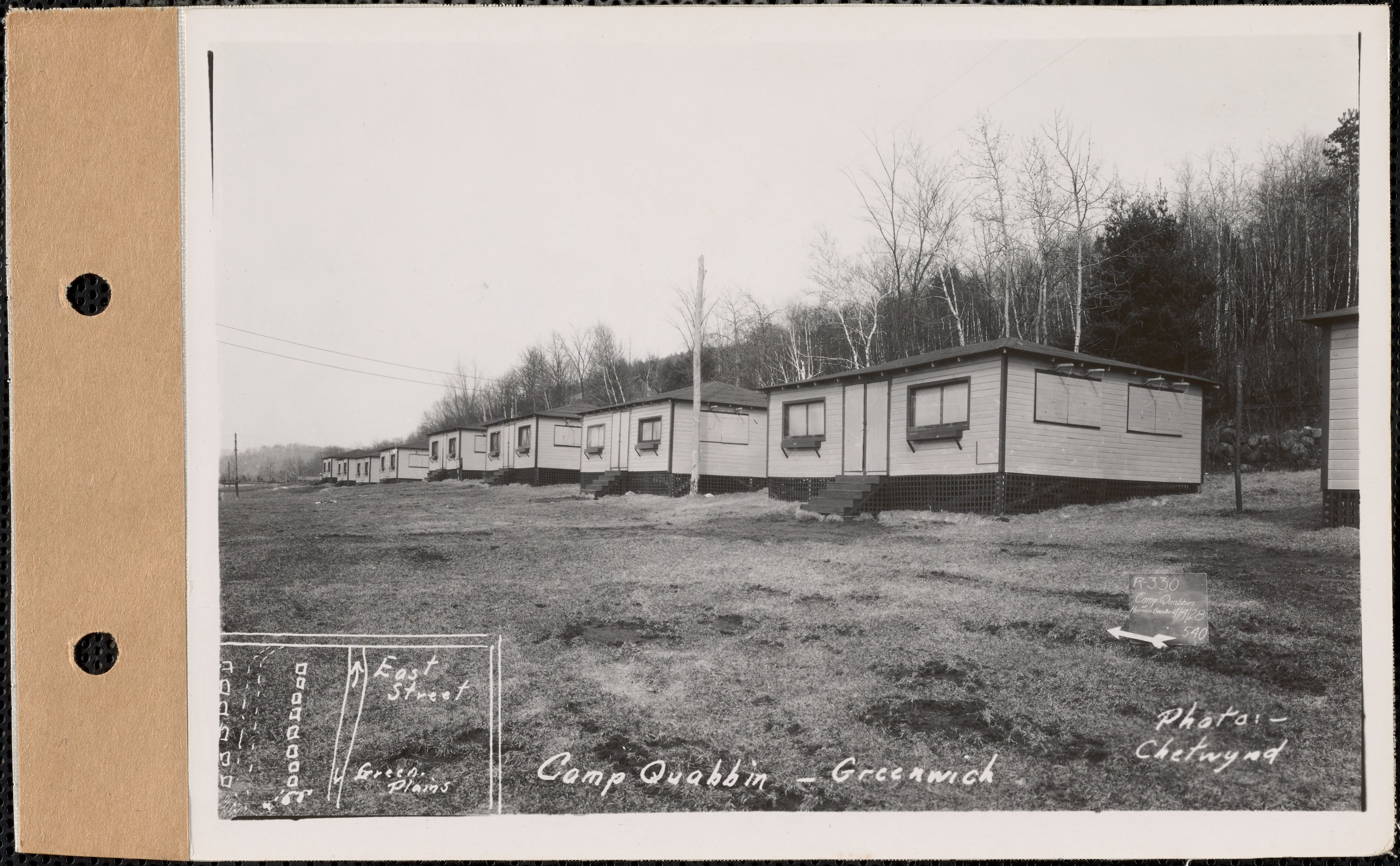
Camp Quabbin in April 1928

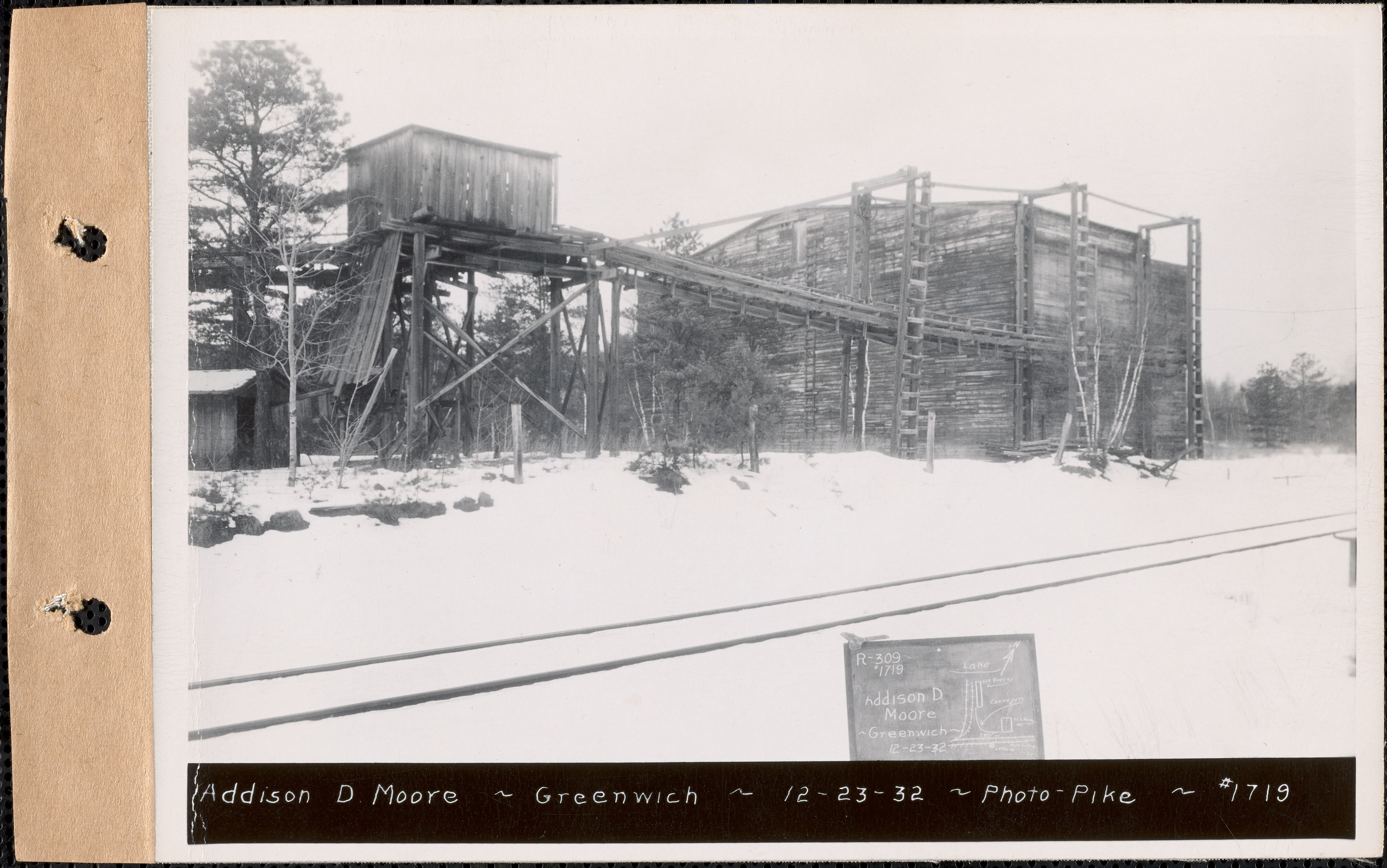
Icehouse in December 1932

== Notable people ==
- Mason C. Darling (1801–1866), Massachusetts and Wisconsin physician, legislator
- Joseph Pomeroy Root (1826–1885), Free Stater, first Lieutenant Governor of Kansas
- Randolph Barnes Marcy (1812–1887), Major General, U.S. Army, Civil War
- Amiel Weeks Whipple (1816–1863), Major General, U.S. Army; mortally wounded at the Battle of Chancellorsville, May 3, 1863; died on May 7

== Related ==
- Greenwich House, an on-campus living facility at Hampshire College in Amherst, Massachusetts, is named after the former town

== Other Quabbin towns that were disincorporated ==
- Dana
- Enfield
- Prescott
