= Dana, Massachusetts =

- Former town
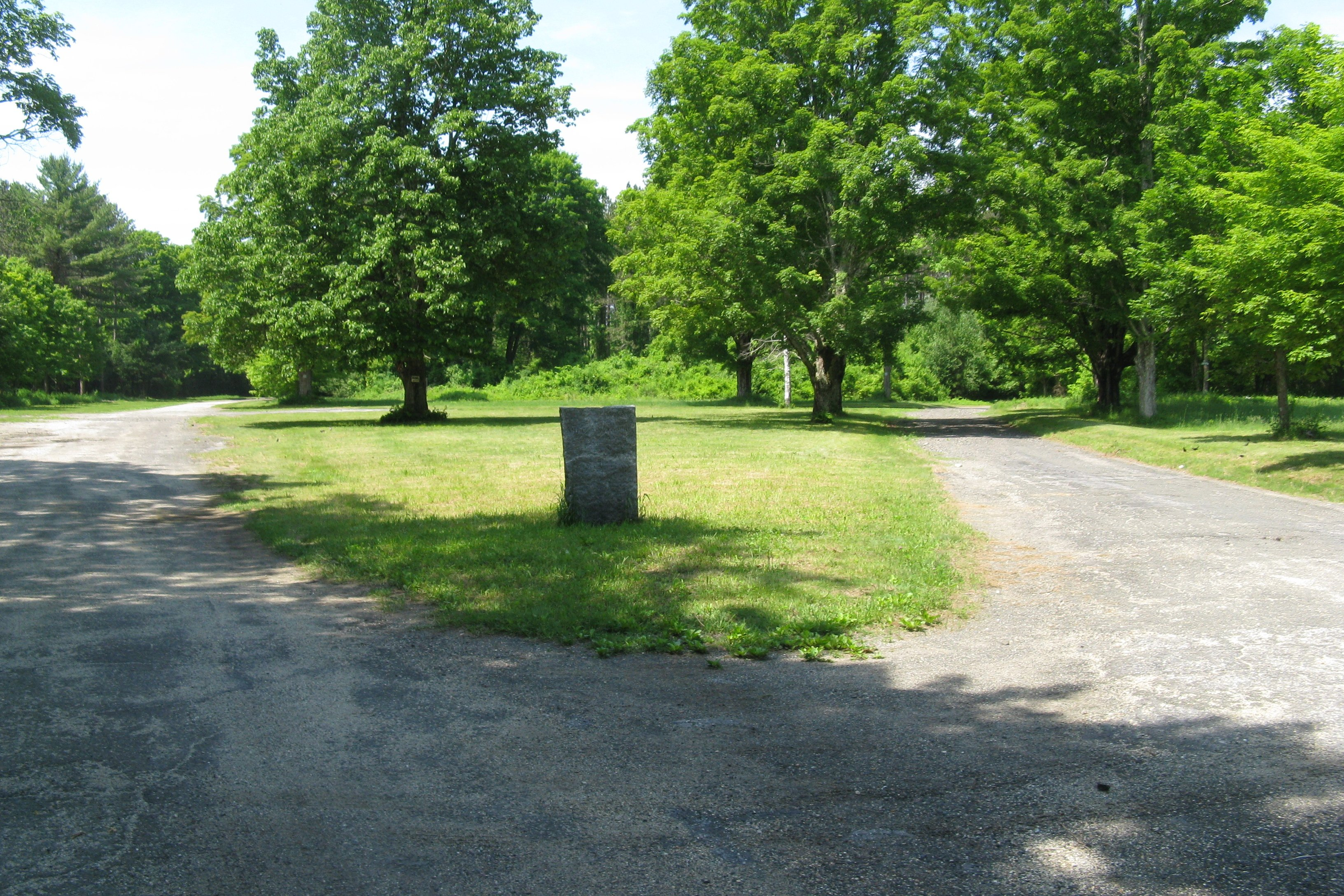
- Site of Dana Common
- Interactive map of Dana, Massachusetts
- Coordinates: 42°25′19″N 72°13′39″W
- Country: United States
- State: Massachusetts
- County: Worcester
- Settled: 1676
- Incorporated: February 18, 1801
- Disincorporated: April 28, 1938
- Time zone: UTC-5 (Eastern)
  - Summer (DST): Eastern

U.S. National Register of Historic Places
- Designated: March 4, 2013
- Reference no.: 13000052

Dana was a town located in Worcester County, Massachusetts, United States. Dana was disincorporated as a result of the construction of the Quabbin Reservoir.

== History ==
Formed from parts of Petersham, Greenwich, and Hardwick, it was incorporated in 1801. The town was named for Massachusetts statesman Francis Dana. The town was disincorporated on April 28, 1938, as part of the creation of the Quabbin Reservoir. Upon disincorporation, all of the town was ceded to the adjacent town of Petersham. The majority of the land of the former town is still above water.

As with the nearby town of Prescott, after disincorporation, houses were moved or razed, but cellar holes remained. The public is only allowed to visit the former town of Dana by foot, as the old narrow road is blocked off to cars. In the town center (which is still somewhat maintained by the Massachusetts Department of Conservation and Recreation), a stone marker has been installed, which reads: "SITE OF DANA COMMON 1801-1938 To all those who sacrificed their homes and way of life (Erected by Dana Reunion, 1996)". The common and a 68-acre (28 ha) area encompassing the former town center has been listed on the National Register of Historic Places.

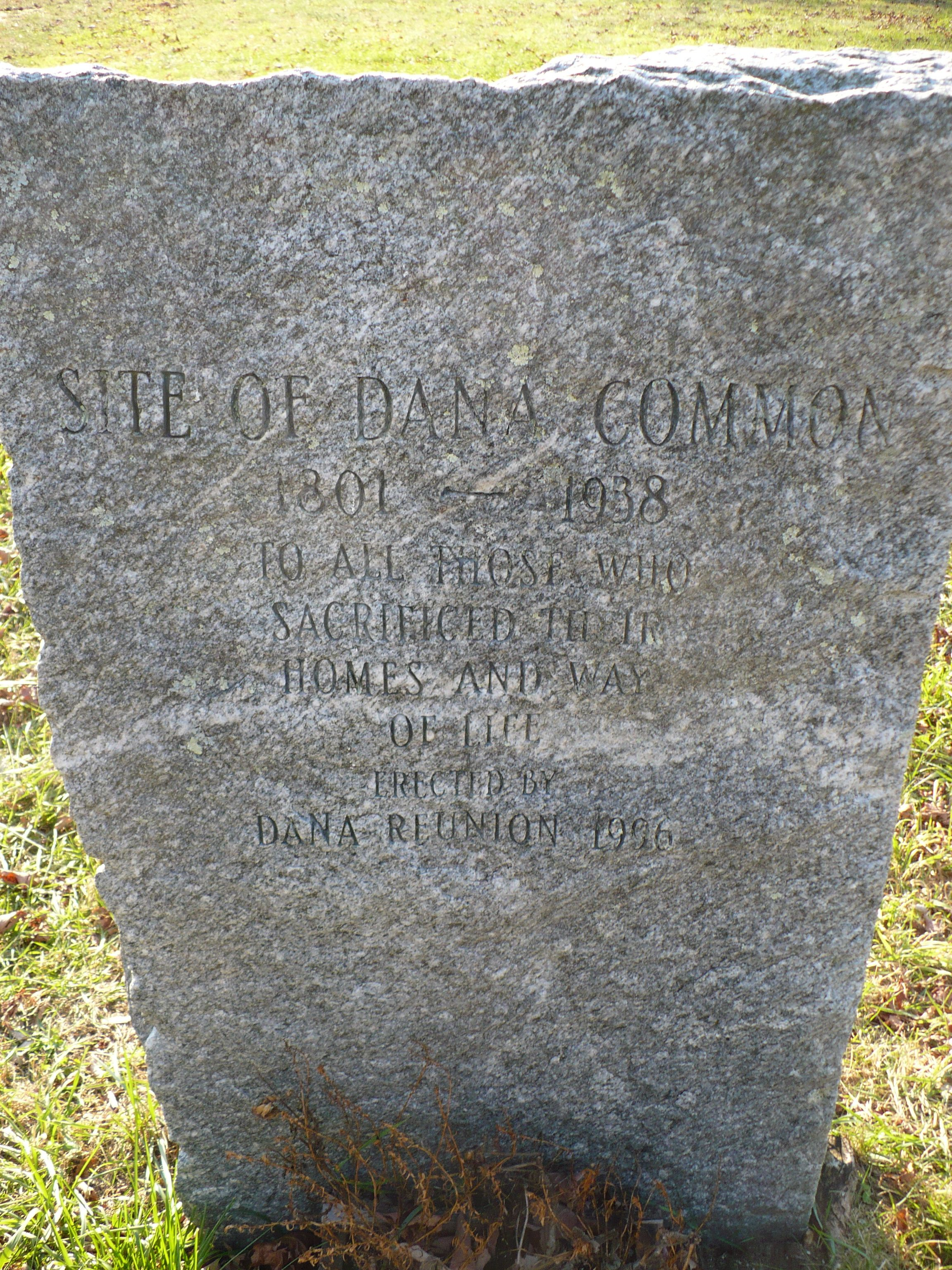
The stone marker mentioned above

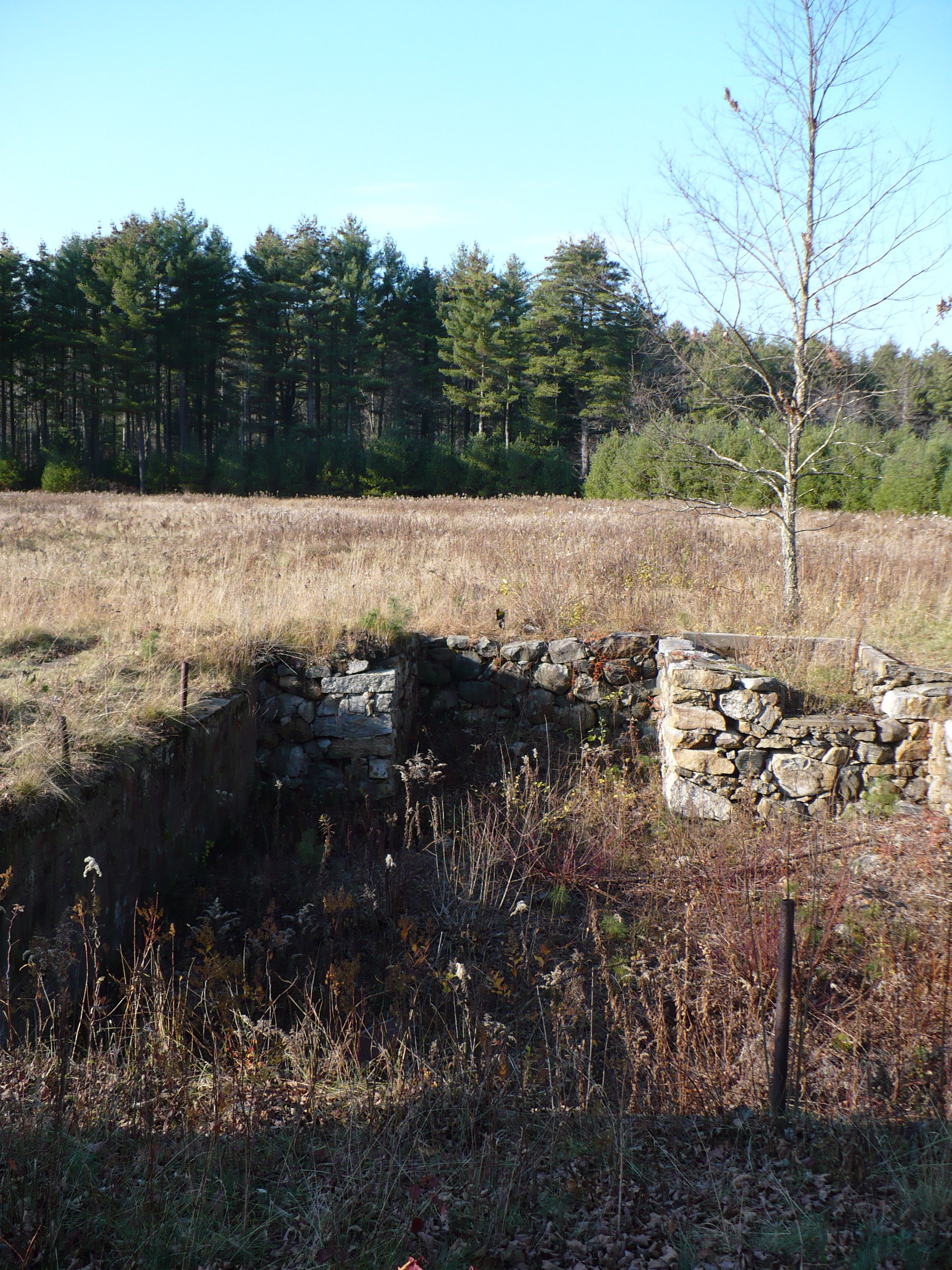
One of the many cellar holes remaining in the former town

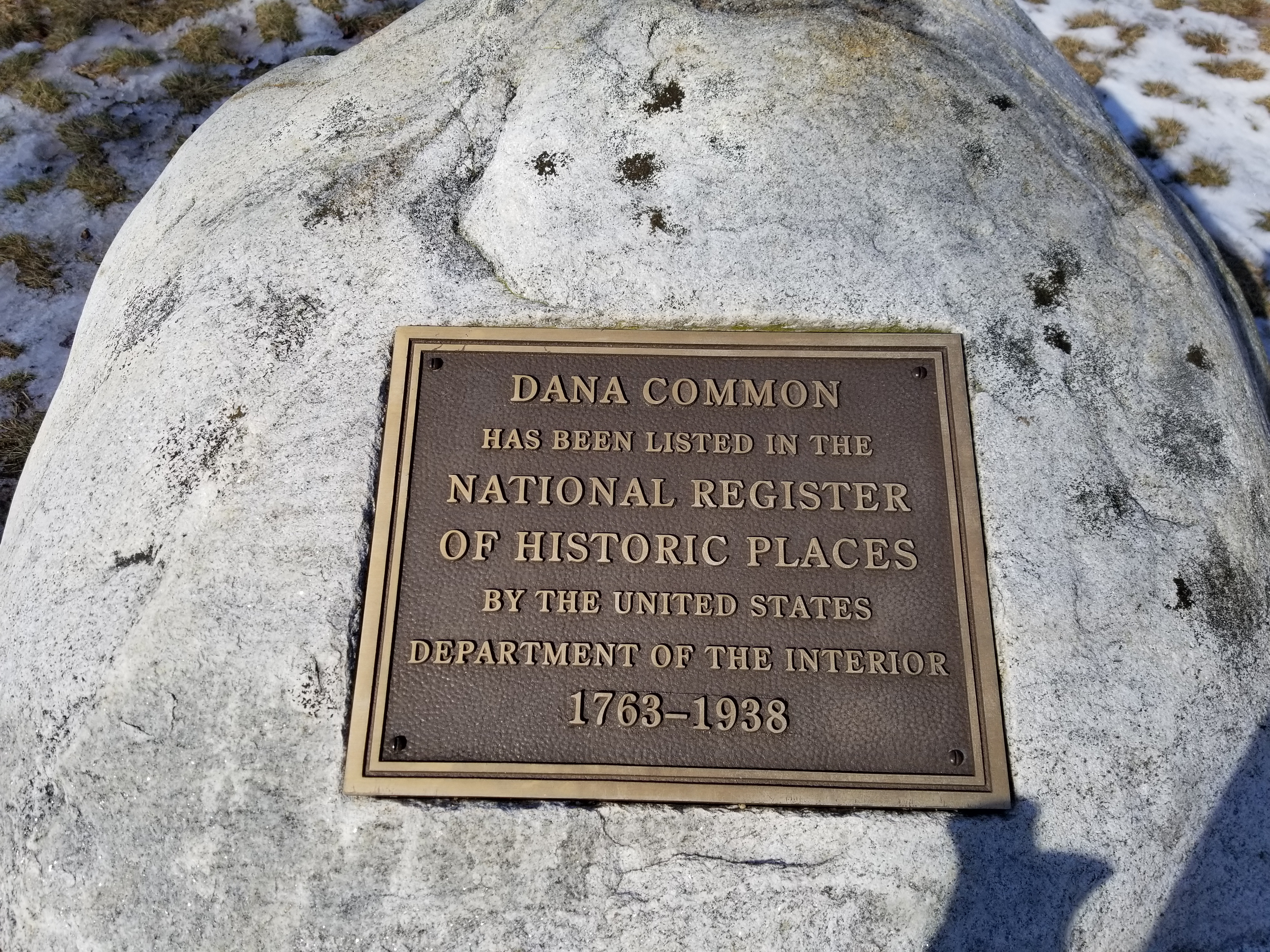
National Register of Historic Places marker

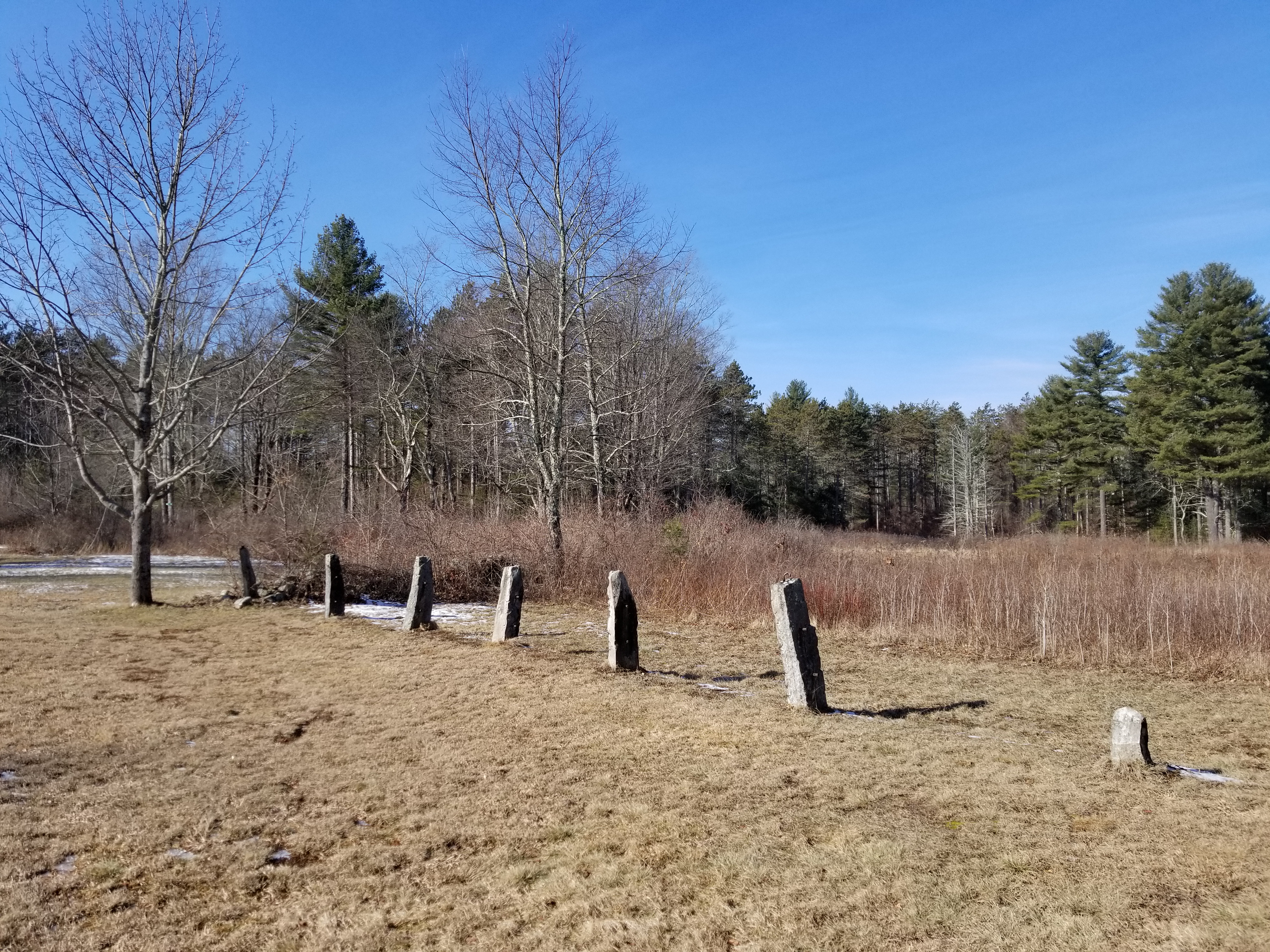
Old fence posts near Dana Common

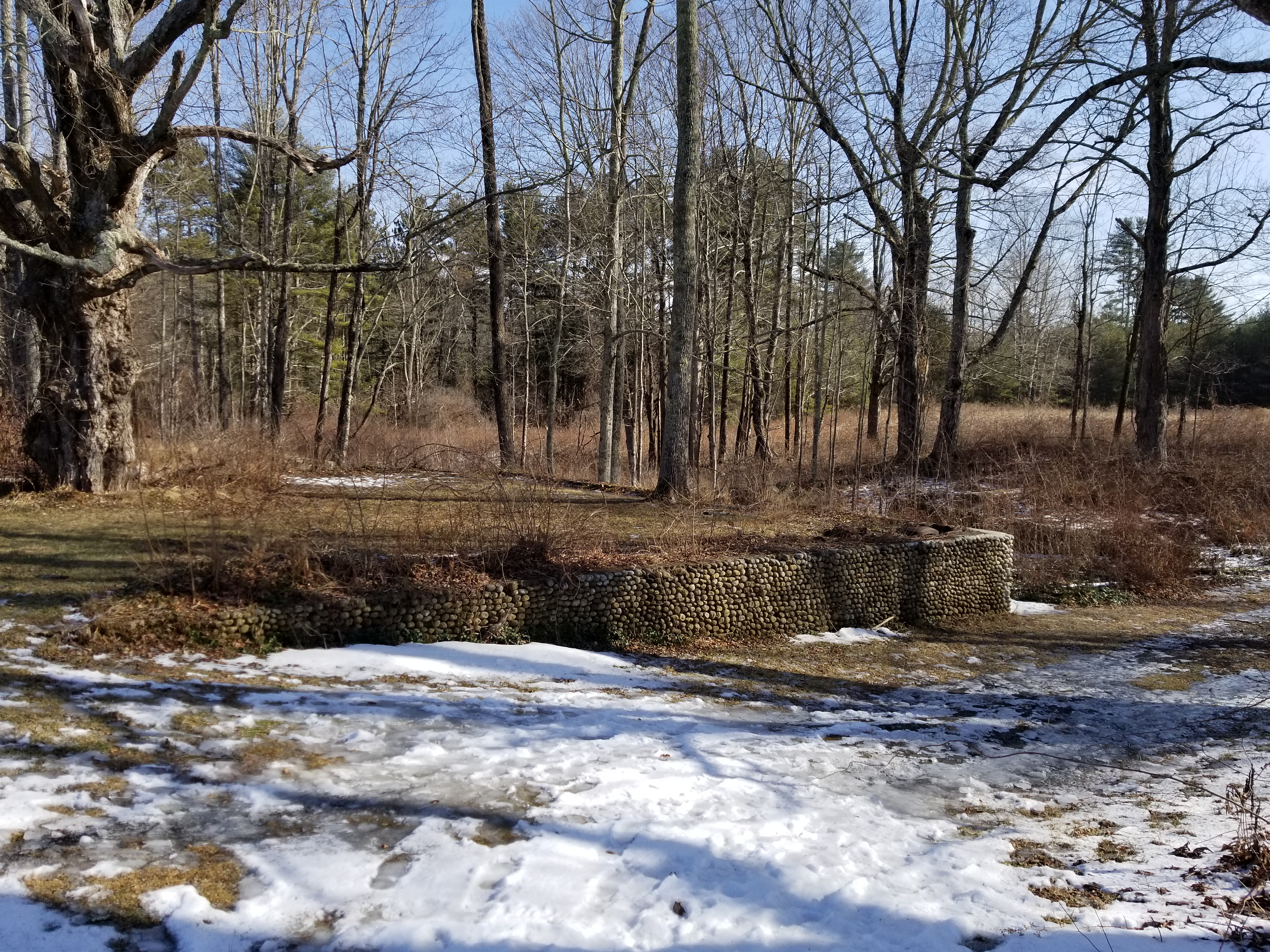
Stone building foundation at Dana Common

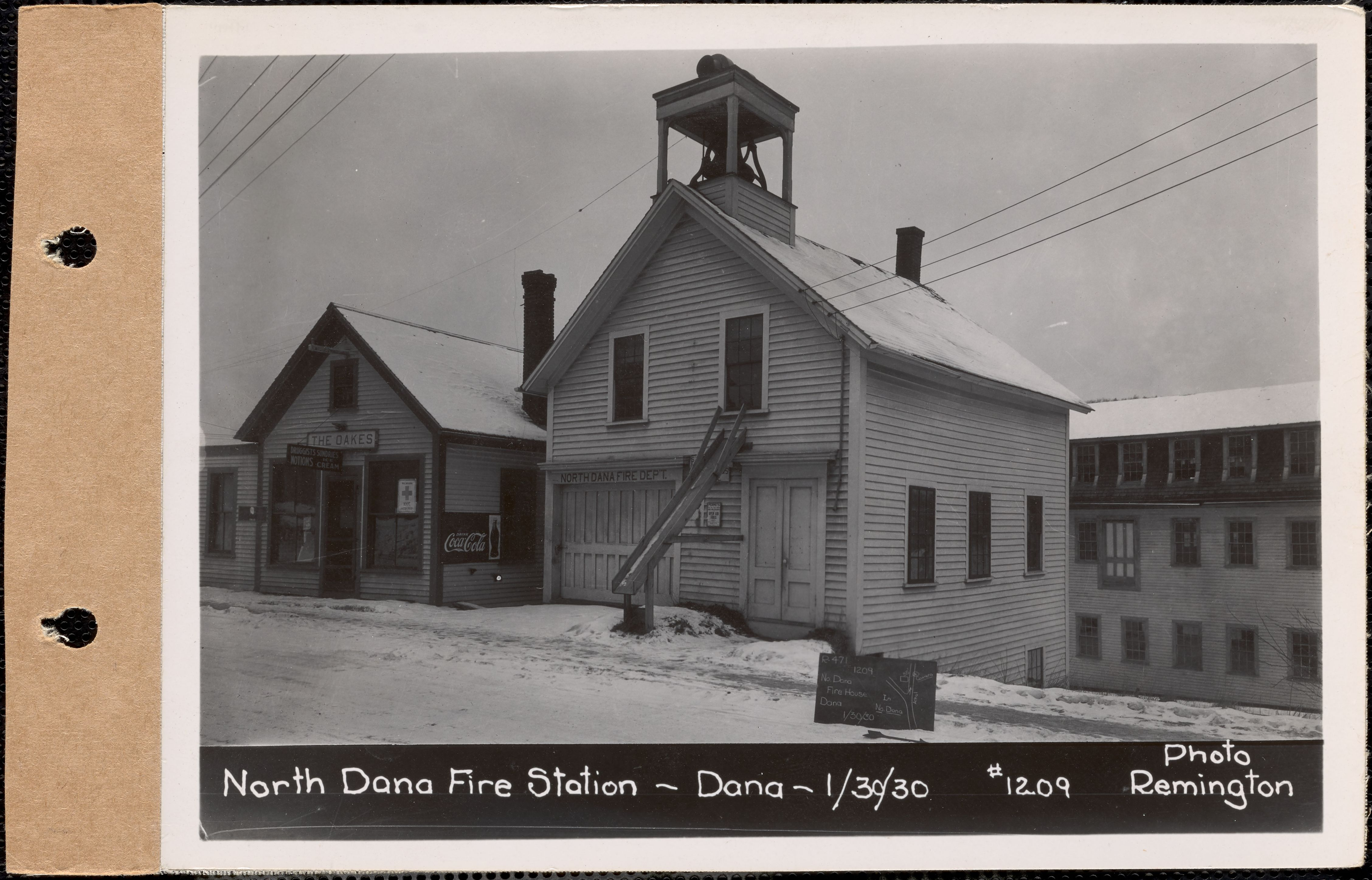
North Dana Fire Station in January 1930

== Other Quabbin towns ==
- Greenwich
- Enfield
- Prescott

== See also ==
- National Register of Historic Places listings in Worcester County, Massachusetts
