= Nathaniel Dudley Goodell =

American architect (1814–1895)

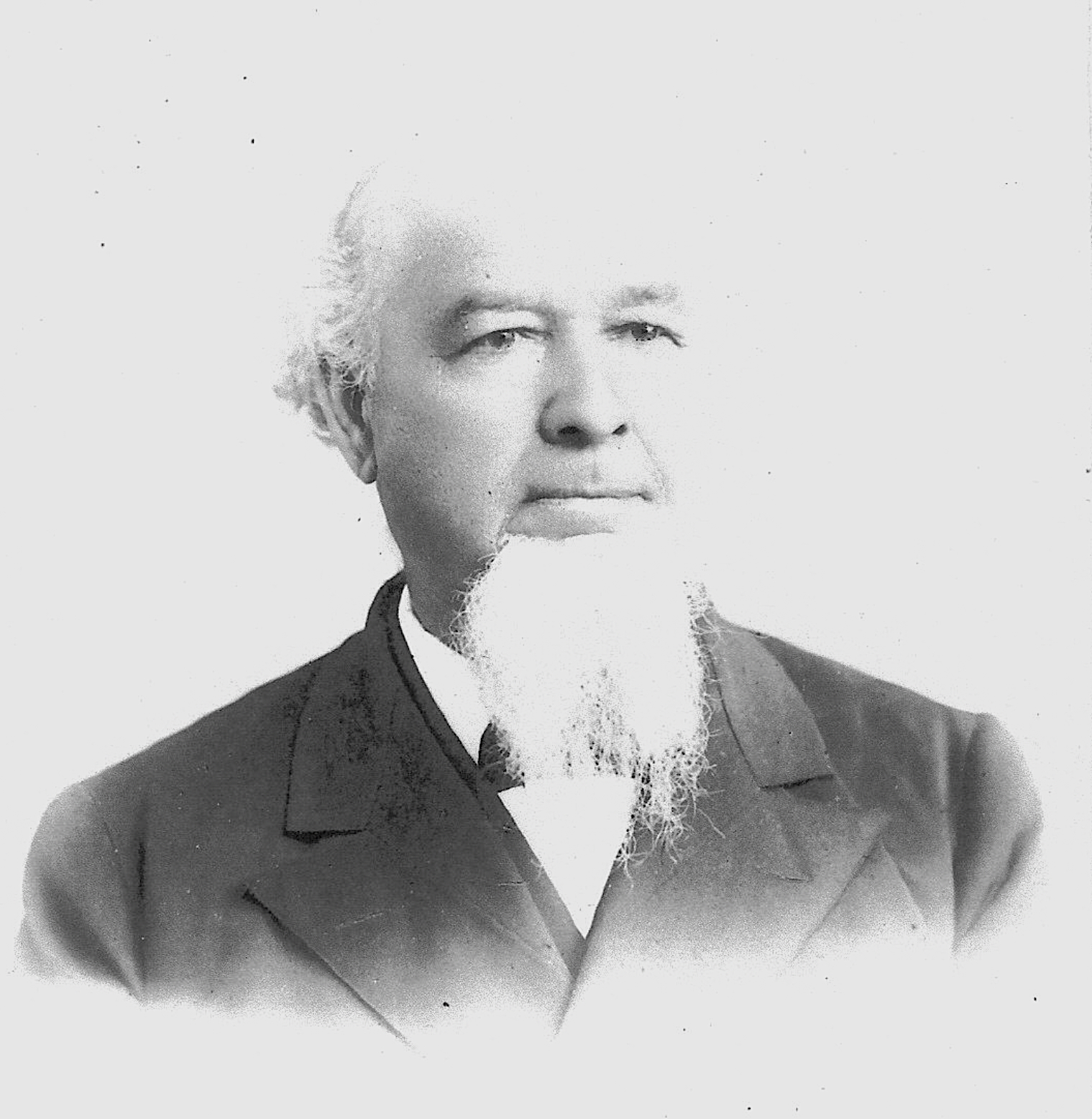
Nathaniel Dudley Goodell

Nathaniel Dudley Goodell (April 18, 1814– November 30, 1895) was an American architect whose work remains in Massachusetts and California.

He was born in 1814 in Dwight, Massachusetts, a village in North Belchertown, the fifth surviving son of the twelve children of Moses Goodell (1777-1854) and Susanna Pettengill (1778-1848). His grandparents, from Connecticut, established a homestead along today's Federal Street in 1777.

Nathaniel Goodell obtained a common school education and apprenticed under builder-architect Warren Shove Howland (1798-1872) in Amherst, Massachusetts.

He married Sarah Pease (1816-1902), of Granby, in 1838, the same year he moved to Ware where he designed three large factories, including Mill No. 1, and several hundred houses for employees of the Otis Manufacturing Co.

According to "Gone to Rest" by the Sacramento Pioneer Association (2001), he came to San Francisco in the summer of 1849 and "tried mining around Mormon Island and Placerville (then Hangtown) with little success."

"At Sacramento, one hundred miles up the river, we found about five thousand men living in tents," he said later (1873) at a family reunion held in Amherst. "I saw but one woman in the whole town at that time, and only one framed building. Everything seemed to be in perfect confusion. Goods of every description were scattered about up and down the river banks, tobacco, nails and trunks of clothes, were left as of no account, while the boys had gone to the mines…”

His brother escorted his wife and two children, by way of Nicaragua, to join him in 1852.

Goodell then worked in construction in Sacramento after which he found his "niche as an architect and was in great demand."

His letters regarding his time in California during the Gold Rush have been preserved at the Jones Library in Amherst, Massachusetts.

His hundreds of works in Massachusetts and California include the Jackson Fay Brown House, the Heilbron House and the California Governor's Mansion. Many are on the National Register of Historic Places.

He is the brother of Ira Chaffee Goodell and uncle of American physician Ellen Goodell Smith and horticulturalist Lafayette Goodell.

He died in 1895 and buried with his wife and daughter in California.
