= Lafayette Washington Goodell =

American horticulturist (1851-1920)

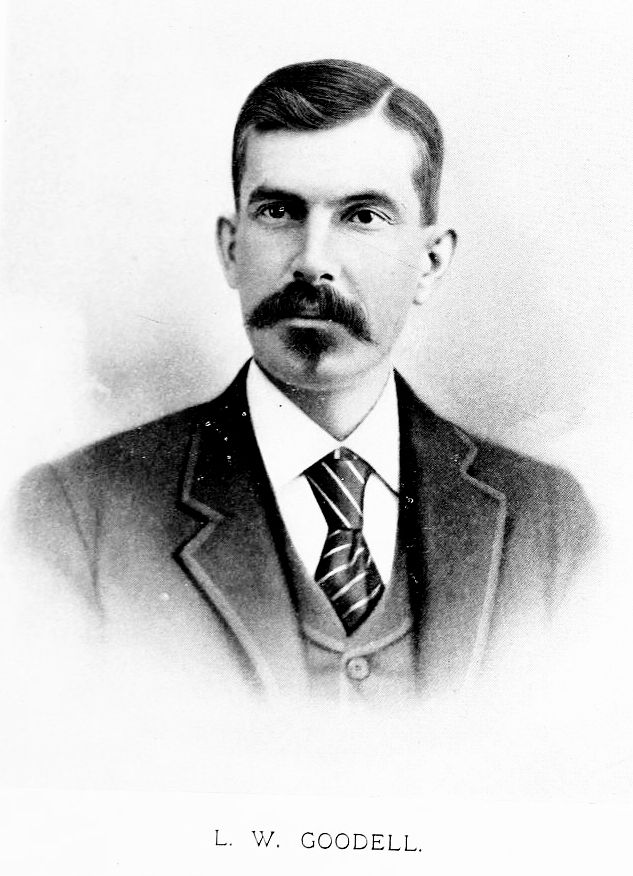
Lafayette Washington Goodell

Lafayette Washington Goodell (October 31, 1851–June 25, 1920) was a horticulturalist, florist and founder of Pansy Park, the former aquatic and flower gardens and seed business in Western Massachusetts.

Born in North Belchertown a decade before the American Civil War, he was likely named for General Lafayette, the French-born American Revolutionary War hero who passed in the vicinity of the family's home during his celebrated Farewell Tour in the summer of 1825. Lafayette's father was a teenager at the time.

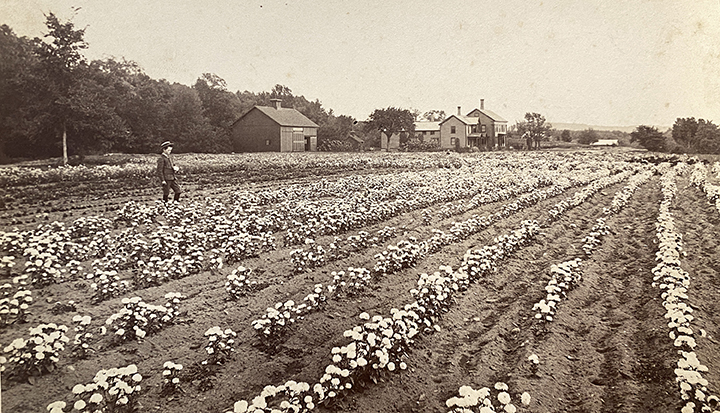
Pansy Park, North Belchertown, Dwight Village, Massachusetts. Circa 1885. Goodell Home in the background. The Home still stands today at 1100 Federal St. Photograph taken by L. W. Goodell, Founder of Pansy Park. Courtesy Special Collections, Jones Library, Amherst, Mass.

== Pansy Park ==
Lafayette began a seed business, with the help of his brother, on their father's "rundown" 250-acre farm in North Belchertown in 1868 with a $25 investment.

They later erected greenhouses and ponds for aquatic plants and called the place "Pansy Park," which "drew summertime travelers intent on witnessing the gorgeous floral displays.” The Park, about 12 acres, featured a wide array of thousands of popular and exotic plants like pansies, petunias, pinks and asters.

These included Emperor William's blue corn-flower, and in the aquatic gardens on the site, the Egyptian lotus (introduced later to Forest Park in Springfield) and the world's second largest water lily, the Victoria Regia, from the Amazon. Lafayette was the first to grow the Victoria "in New England in the open air without artificial heat." The lily pads were often five feet in diameter. The Siberian lilies, the smallest in the world, were white and "about the size of a dime." Goodell sold bulbs imported from Holland, fruit trees, vines, shrubbery, vegetable and flower seeds.

In 1885, the Central Massachusetts Railroad erected a flag stop on its new line and named it "Pansy Park." [It later became the Boston & Maine Railroad, which remained active into the 1930s and is today part of the Massachusetts Central Rail Trail.]

By 1890, Lafayette was said to have more than 50,000 customers; some 200,000 catalogs went out in one year alone, according to newspaper reports. With the nearby railroad stop, Pansy Park attracted "thousands of visitors annually from far and near."

With no formal training, Lafayette was self-taught in horticulture and imported seeds from England, France and Germany. He conducted flower breeding experiments and published his findings. A "life member" of eight agricultural and horticultural societies, he attended every Hampshire County Agricultural Society fair for half a century. His fruits, flowers and vegetables were awarded 300 prizes. The Massachusetts Horticultural Society published his paper, "Aquatic Plants and Their Culture." He was an amateur photographer; local archives preserved many originals.

Lafayette's older brother, Wesley Melanchon Goodell (1846-1934), helped begin the seed business and Park. In 1885, he became a stationmaster of the Central Vermont Railway at Dwight as well as the postmaster. He was a well-known contributing correspondent to The Republican. He donated many of the family's artifacts and papers to local libraries and a family Bible to Amherst College.

== Goodell family ==
Lafayette W. Goodell was the seventh of the eight children of Asahel Hulet Goodell (1810–1900) and Cynthia Tilson Newell (1815–1896). His sister was Ellen Goodell Smith. Lafayette was the nephew of Nathaniel Dudley Goodell and Ira Chaffee Goodell. His mother was a lineal descendent of Roger Williams, founder of Rhode Island.

His father refurbished clothing around New England, wrote for newspapers and was a well-known prognosticator, predicting events of local, national and worldwide importance. Asahel advocated for locating the Massachusetts Agricultural College in Amherst, which is today the University of Massachusetts. He was a staunch abolitionist and in 1842, he was said to be one of the three (out of 400 voters) in Belchertown who voted for the antislavery candidate for the legislature. He was reportedly "intimate friends" with William Lloyd Garrison, Wendell Phillips and Charles Sumner.

Lafayette's great-grandfather was Nathaniel Goodell (1740–1814), who came from Woodstock, Connecticut with Abigail Chaffee (1737–1811) and their young children to settle in North Belchertown by 1777. Nathaniel provided service during the American Revolutionary War and was among the 65 Belchertown men who signed an oath of allegiance after many marched through Belchertown with Daniel Shays during Shays Rebellion.

Their farm was "known as a stopping place for the circuit riders and other church officials, beginning about 1808. Nathaniel and his family were extremely hospitable to the itinerant ministers, and they came from miles around to stay all night at the Goodell Homestead when traveling through the countryside.”

The family was notable for its abolitionism and interest in religion, phrenology, mesmerism, free love and spiritualism and its members' various accomplishments in architecture, horticulture, photography, journalism, medicine and the arts. One contribution was the first-person detailed and colorful descriptions of 19th century life and people in the area—which became known as "Logtown" and later as "Dwight's Station"—that were left behind in letters that were authored by family members, most notably by Ira Chaffee Goodell (1800–1877).

The family's original homestead (ca. 1765) was torn down about 1875; the Dwight Station Mini Mart stands roughly in its spot, mimicking its gabled outline. Lafayette W. Goodell was born in the family's second homestead, originally designed in the Federal style and erected in 1833 by Lafayette's father. It remains north of today's Dwight Station Mini Mart on the east side of Federal Street. Sold out of the family in 1928, it has by turns been a small inn, a tavern, a dance and music hall and several restaurants. Today, it is privately owned.
