= John B. Smith =

John B. Smith may refer to:

- John B. Smith (Washington politician), American politician
- John B. Smith (Wisconsin politician), American politician
- John Baptist Smith (1843–1923), Confederate States Army officer
- John Benjamin Smith (1796–1879), British politician
- John Bernhardt Smith (1858–1912), American entomologist
- John Blair Smith (1764–1799), president of Union College
- John Brown Smith (1837–?), American anarchist
- John Butler Smith (1838–1914), American politician
