= Dwight, Massachusetts =

Village in Belchertown, Massachusetts, United States

Coordinates: 42°19′40″N 72°26′58″W

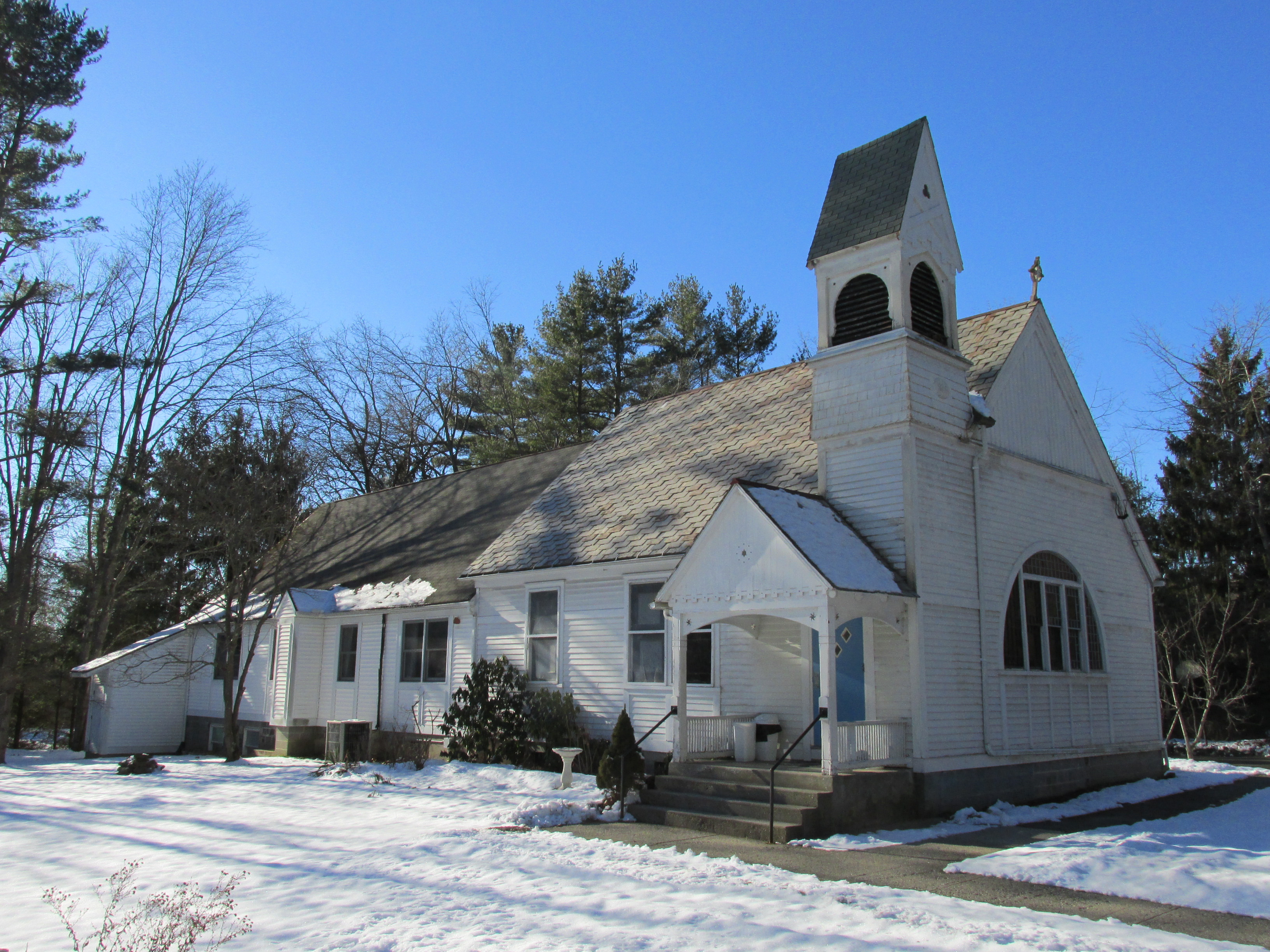
The Dwight Chapel, its cornerstone laid October 6, 1886, pictured today

Dwight is an unincorporated, historical village in North Belchertown, Massachusetts, United States, named for the Dwight family.

It was a railroad destination and farming community in the 19th century with lumber mills, grist mills, schools, a chapel, cemeteries, two railway depots, flower fields, aquatic gardens, restaurants, ballrooms, inns, a silk mill, a carding mill, a woodturning mill, an apiary, a cider mill, a carriage-maker, wheelwright, gunsmith and blacksmith, a general store and post office. Today the community is known for its natural beauty, artists, photographers, scenic waterfalls, wildlife, forests, ponds, lakes, brooks, springs, hiking trails, and bike paths.

The community held what were known as grove dinners for many years, under the old maple trees near the schoolhouse, across Federal Street from the Dwight Chapel. In 2024 and 2025, the Massachusetts Cultural Council and the Belchertown Historical Association supported Dwight Day, a festival of music, food, history, reenactments, nature talks and culture, held at the historic Dwight Chapel, the space donated by the Christ Community Church.

The village developed around a heavily forested, mountainous, remote no-man's-land between the town commons of Amherst and Belchertown. It features the intersection of three cascading brooks: Montague, Scarborough and Hop. Jabish forms on its eastern border. Native Americans traversed its southern boundary for centuries before non-indigenous third and fourth generations of the original Massachusetts and Connecticut colonists harvested candle-wood, grazed cattle, boxed pine trees for turpentine and set ring fires for hunting deer, eventually putting up cabins in the late eighteenth century.

It was known first as "Log Town" for its timber industry, later it took on the names "Dwight's Station," for an early railroad stationmaster, and "Pansy Park," for the flourishing gardens visited annually by hundreds of tourists and consumers of flower seeds. The village encompasses the low-lying lakes region (Arcadia and Holland) and the mountainous northeastern region known as Mead's Corner, Knight's Pond and West Hill, or Great Hill, which is traversed by Munsell Street.

== Geography ==
The center of Dwight is in the Pioneer Valley, or Connecticut River Valley, of Western Massachusetts, in the eastern part of Hampshire County, and the northwestern region of Belchertown, defined as the intersection of Federal and Goodell Streets. Village boundaries have historically formed a square, approximately 10 mi.² or about 3.2 linear miles east to west and 3.2 linear miles north to south. Pelham is to the north, Amherst and the Lawrence Swamp on the west, the northern boundary line of the Town of Granby to Lake Arcadia to Route 202 on the south and Jabish Brook and Pelham on the east.

The center of Dwight lies further from Belchertown Common than from other populated places. It's about 4.8 road-miles northwest, by State Route 9, but only 4.2 miles southwest from West Pelham; 4.2 miles southeast from East Amherst Common; and 3.5 miles east from the South Amherst Common. It is 2.5 miles from the extinct village in South Amherst called Nuttingville. The southwestern boundary of Dwight is the northwestern corner of Granby, about 1.5 linear miles from the center of Dwight.

In 1786, the Town of Pelham annexed a square mile section on Pelham's southern border that incorporated part of North Belchertown (Log Town) and included the village of Packardsville, now extinct after the Quabbin Reservoir was built.

Belchertown's historical central eastern and northeastern boundary once extended to the Swift River, until 1816, when Enfield was formed out of part of Belchertown. This section was re-annexed to Belchertown in 1938 and became part of the Quabbin Reservoir.

Several early village residents—decidedly too far from the Congregational Church at Belchertown or dissatisfied with it or both—petitioned the General Court and were granted the right to be "annexed to the second parish of Amherst for parochial privileges."

=== Natural resources ===
Dwight encompasses many unnamed historical ponds and several lakes: its present named bodies of water are Lake Holland, about 1 linear mile south of the center of the village, Lake Arcadia, about 1.3 linear miles south, Scarborough (Scarboro) Ponds, about 1.7 linear miles northeast of the center, Two Ponds (seasonal) and Knight's Pond (which includes Gold's Pond), which is 2.4 linear miles northeast of the center.

There are numerous unnamed tributaries, vernal pools, and hundreds of acres of conservation land that the Town manages in and around Dwight including Holland Glen, Wentworth Property, Topping Farm, Lashway Property, Warren Wright Road, Holyoke Range, Arcadia Bog, Scarborough Brook, Upper Gulf, Mead's Corner, Reed Property and part of Jabish Brook. The Kestrel Land Trust provides trail maps of Holland Glen, Scarborough Brook and Jabish Brook.

The peak of West Hill, a region of early non-indigenous settlement in Dwight, known for its panoramic view of the Holyoke Range and the Connecticut River Valley, is 1.6 linear miles northeast of the center, and measures 1,070 feet above sea level.

An unnamed peak to the southeast of West Hill, or immediately south of the Munsell Cemetery, is 1,075 feet, and Juckett Hill, once called "East Hill," in far northeastern Belchertown, stands at 1,070 feet.

Dwight's modern boundary encompasses Lake Holland, or Holland Pond, named for J.G. Holland, and Arcadia Lake, named for Arcadia, a region in southern Greece and the poetic byword celebrating an idyllic vision of unspoiled, harmonious wilderness.

==== Lakes region ====
About three miles northwest of the Belchertown Common, historically referred to as the Pond Hill region of Belchertown, is Lake Metacomet. It is immediately south of Dwight, completing a series of three kettle-hole lakes including Holland Pond and Lake Arcadia, the site of today's Town Beach, managed by the Town's recreation department.

On surveys made by Timothy Dwight in 1727, the Lake was referred to as the Nine Mile Pond. The area is coincidentally about 9 miles from the banks of the Connecticut River. Later that century, the Lake and region was referred to as the Bridgman District, and the Bridgman Ponds, as that family owned much land here; its members, at one time, were said to comprise most of the voters in the area. Then, they were referred to as the Lower, Middle and Upper Ponds.

In July 1913, the ponds were given their current names after an editorial published by a popular Belchertown business owner in The Springfield Daily Republican and subsequent vote by the Town.

The upper pond was named Holland Pond after the author J. G. Holland, who was born near here. The middle pond was named Lake Arcadia after the Greek word denoting both place and idea. "No lovelier scenery could be found in so limited a space," wrote J. W. Jackson in The Republican. "The picturesque mountains, the round, blue lake, the silent forest and the roadside flowers. Here, silent, within a few miles of thriving cities and prosperous towns, lies the Greek for beautiful scenery."

The lower pond was named Lake Metacomet after the Native American sachem to the Wampanoag people, fatally shot by a praying Indian named John Alderman, on August 12, 1676, in the Miery Swamp near Mount Hope in Bristol, Rhode Island. In 1917, land north of the Lake was given to the Town to be used as a park.

"There is no doubt that once one beautiful lake rested in this valley, and that on its shores the Indians had their camp and villages," Jackson wrote in The Republican. "For in my studies of these lakes I have discovered what was an Indian village or camp-ground. In my search during more than 20 years, I have found many fine and perfect arrow and spear points, axes, hatchets, hoes, scrapers, mortars, pestles, ceremonial emblems and pipes and quantities of chips. These implements were made from flint, quartz, soapstone and trap rock."

The Tri-Lakes Watershed Association, or Friends of the Tri-Lakes, is a nonprofit organization that formed in 1988 to help maintain the health of the three lakes. A Town committee was formed in 2011. Once a public recreational and picnic area, today private homes line the shorelines.

An early cemetery developed in the area called variously Metacomet, Pond Hill or Lake Vale, its first interment reportedly in 1730: 18-year-old Ruth Warner.

There was also, in this region, a school called Lake Vale dating to 1784. A flag stop on the Amherst & Belchertown Railroad (later the New London Northern Railroad and the Central Vermont Railway) was built about 1853 or later. It was known as the "Federal Street" stop, which was near today's intersection of Bay Road and the New England Central Railroad tracks.

Other than the Bridgmans, the Freeman family lived in this region for generations as well as Hannums.

==== Holland Glen ====
Holland Glen is a 290-acre old-growth forest conservation area known as a natural "crown jewel," southeast of the center of Dwight that features hiking trails, waterfalls, small pools and "a deep, narrow chasm with steep sides covered thickly with a growth of pine and hemlock." The Belchertown Historical Association began acquiring land, with the purchase of just seven acres, in the early 1900s before it was "mutilated by lumbering operations," according to The Springfield Republican. The Glen, managed by the Kestrel Land Trust, was named for Josiah Gilbert Holland and is accessible from State Route 9.

Above the Glen are springs that form the Hop Brook. It flows in a westerly direction and enters the Lawrence Swamp in South Amherst, and empties into the Fort River.

Scarborough Brook begins on the West Hill, north of Holland Glen and the Hop Brook. It runs west and the southerly and created the narrow ravine of Gulf Road. Its mouth is at the Hop Brook, to the west of Federal Street near the Daigle Well.

Montague Brook begins in south Pelham, in a spring-field near the Mountain Goat Loop hiking trail, flowing in a southwesterly direction through Dwight, and enters the Hop Brook in the Lawrence Swamp.

A fourth unnamed brook begins in the unnamed wetland south of North Street and east of Federal Street and empties into the Hop Brook in the Topping Farm Conservation Area, 220 acres that nearly connects Lawrence Swamp and the Mount Holyoke Range.

==== Lawrence Swamp ====
In the Western section of Dwight straddling the Belchertown and South Amherst border is the Lawrence Swamp, a thousand acres of forested wetland, scrub-shrub floodplain, and open meadow and habitat for rare species of birds and wildlife. It contains numerous hiking trails and several wells that produce drinking water for Amherst. Its watershed encompasses most of the Dwight area.

The Swamp is most accessible at the Norwottuck Branch Rail Trail entrance on Station Road in South Amherst, which becomes North Street in Dwight.

==== Hiking and biking ====
The Norwottuck Branch Rail Trail, part of the Mass Central Rail Trail, begins in Dwight village, about where the Montague Brook and Central New England Railroad (formerly the Central Vermont R.R.) cross Warren Wright Road, north of Wilson Road. The Trail follows the former rail-bed of the Central Massachusetts/Boston & Maine Railroad that opened in Dwight in 1887.

The Trail stretches through the Lawrence Swamp in a northerly direction before turning west for 11 miles (18 km) on the former rail bed of the Central Massachusetts Railroad (and later a branch of the Boston & Maine Railroad). It is a combination bicycle/pedestrian paved rail trail running from Northampton, Massachusetts, through Hadley and Amherst, to Belchertown, Massachusetts.

The Metacomet-Monadnock Trail, part of the 215-mile New England National Scenic Trail, crosses through the heart of Dwight on Federal Street and up Gulf Road.

The Robert Frost Trail transverses Dwight, following Warren Wright Road across Hop Brook.

Dwight is 2.8 linear miles southwest from Mount Lincoln, a 1,240 feet (380 m) high point on the Pelham Dome or Pelham Hills, an upland plateau overlooking the Connecticut River Valley in Pelham, Massachusetts (near Amherst, Massachusetts). It is taller than the more widely known Mount Norwottuck and Mount Holyoke. The village is 9.6 miles due east and slightly south of the western bank of the bend of the Connecticut River at Hadley, near today's Elwell State Park.

Dwight is located on the far eastern end of the Holyoke Range, part of the Metacomet Ridge of Southern New England. It is 2.2 linear miles northeast of Long Mountain, and 3.5 linear miles northeast of the peak of Mount Norwottuck, the highest point in the Range. Part of the Mount Holyoke Range State Park is accessible in the southwest corner of Dwight.

== Geology ==
Dwight is located in a valley that was covered in water some 15,000 years ago and formed the far eastern shore of the ancient glacial Lake Hitchcock. Lawrence Swamp, to the immediate east of Dwight, is a vestige of this lake. Glaciers deposited sediment-dammed lakes in the Jabish Brook and Broad Brook valleys and an ice-dammed glacial lake in the Knights Pond valley, and coarse- and fine-grained sand deposits along State Route 9, Warren Wright Road, the Lawrence Swamp, and near the Dwight Cemetery. The closest point on the Connecticut River is due east of the village, about 6 linear miles, its eastern bank opposite today's Rainbow Beach Wildlife Management Area.

A prominent fault, the Triassic Border Fault, passes through Dwight, forming the boundary between the Pelham Hills and the Holyoke Mountain Range.

The center of Dwight, at Federal and Goodell Streets, is today at an elevation of 267 feet, which would have been slightly underwater at the time. The lowest elevation, 170 feet, is east Warren Wright Road as it crosses the Hop Brook through the Topping Farm Conservation Area.

The area's glacial history is also seen in numerous ponds and wetlands and, most notably, in the three kettle-hole lakes – Metacomet, Arcadia, and Holland – immediately south of Dwight. The largest of these is Lake Metacomet, at 65 acres and about 15 feet deep.

Deglaciation of Belchertown probably occurred in a span of about 100 years between 12,000 and 12,500 years ago.

=== Water ===
The Daigle Well is located west of Federal Street near the Hop Brook and the mouth of the Scarborough Brook. The well provides public drinking water for Belchertown, with an approved yield of 1.3 million gallons per day. It uses water from a confined sand and gravel aquifer, a bedrock valley that was deepened by advancing glaciers and later filled with sand and gravel overlain by silt and clay from glacial Lake Hitchcock and Lake Lawrence.

There is no Aquifer Protection District for the Daigle Well. The Lashway Property is conservation area set aside for aquifer protection by Belchertown in the Lawrence Swamp.

Most all land in North Belchertown and Dwight is part of the Lawrence Swamp Watershed Protection Zone that supplies the Town of Amherst with drinking water.

The Town of Amherst draws water from an aquifer on Belchertown land that is in Dwight, north of the Daigle Well, between Warren Wright Road and Federal Street, south of North Road, near the Montague Brook.

== History ==
The village has been known historically by various names over the years, beginning with "Log Town," also spelled "Logg-town" and "Logtown"; then "Union" delineating a school district; the short-lived "Hopetown" proposed on February 13, 1852, by the renowned paleontologist and president of Amherst College after which "Dwight's Station" stuck with the completion of the Amherst & Belchertown Railroad and the subsequent erection here of the freight and passenger depot by H. D. Dwight (also "Dwight's"); and finally "Pansy Park" for the unique flower fields and aquatic gardens of the late 19th and early 20th century. Today, it is referred to as Dwight.

As part of Belchertown, the village is a crossroads of Native trails in the Connecticut River Valley in Western Massachusetts that indigenous people traveled, including the Pocumtuc, Nipmuc and Norwottuck, or Nonotuck and Nolwotogg, among others. Artifacts found in the early 20th century just south of Dwight, near Lake Metacomet, suggest, "evidence of Native American occupations" that began some 7,000 years ago. The lake is about nine miles due east of the bend in the Connecticut River at the former Native American settlements where the Towns of Hadley and Northampton are located today.

Those Native Peoples created and used what became the Hadley Trail or Path, which traversed the southern end of Dwight. Non-indigenous peoples were using it soon after 1660, leading them from "Old Hadley (through territory that became Belchertown and Ware) to Quabaug (Brookfield), connecting the two settlements socially and commercially." It was the military road during King Philip's War and "continued the main line of travel between the two points for nearly a century." By 1673, it was part of Old Bay Path from Boston, which split at West Brookfield, one road leading to Springfield, the other to Hadley. Eventually it ran to points west, to Albany, New York. Today's Bay Road follows the approximate route for about 11 miles, from eastern Belchertown into Hadley.

=== Non-indigenous settlers ===
In 1719, Benjamin Stebbins Sr. (1687–1769), of Northampton, is listed as a "nonresident proprietor," on a deed of 300 acres in Belchertown with the "Cold Spring" in the southwest corner, according to a survey made by Timothy Dwight. Some sources place the first date of settlement in July 1731, but 1727 is the year that the first non-indigenous inhabitants in Belchertown are said to have built a homestead to the immediate south of the Dwight boundary, along today's Stebbins Street, just south of Bay Road, or in the Pond Hill/Lakes region. The property was at the "southern foot of the eastern spur" of the Holyoke Range. Stebbins received from Jonathan Belcher five hundred acres of land in 1727, "as an inducement … to settle [Belchertown]" and was "said to have been the first … to make a permanent residence" though it was likely his son, Benjamin Stebbins Jr. (1711–1789), who first settled here; he married Rebecca Day (1713–1769) on September 26, 1733. They raised children, both died and were buried in Belchertown.

An elder cousin settled nearby: Samuel Stebbins (1758–1732), a widower who had served variously as constable, treasurer and tythingman. He died on September 3, 1732, and was among the first burials at Lake Vale Cemetery, overlooking Lake Metacomet. Samuel was the subject of a scandalous divorce, worth mentioning here, involving several children fathered with a woman other than his wife in the late 17th century and crimes including "selling strong drink."

The homestead on Stebbins Street, a Dutch colonial gambrel built in 1768 by Gideon Stebbins, son of Benjamin and Rebecca, burned to the ground in 1966.

In 1728, Deacon Aaron Lyman (1705–1780) came from Northampton and was said to have been licensed to operate a tavern to the south of the Belchertown Common, near the Cold Spring, a naturally occurring spring for horses, frequented by indigenous peoples. Five years later, he would marry Eunice Dwight (1710–1760), whose cousins, Timothy Dwight (1694–1771) and brother Nathaniel Dwight (1712–1784), both surveyors, were among the founders of the Town. Lyman's sister Hannah (1708–1792) married Nathaniel Dwight. Lyman was elected deacon in 1737.

Ebenezer Bridgman (1686–1769) and Mary Parsons (1680–1770) came from Northampton in 1732 to Pond Hill. Their great-grandson was Elijah Coleman Bridgman, first missionary to China, who was born in the Joseph Bridgman (1712–1773) home, a Dutch colonial gambrel dating ca. 1750–1770, that remains at 393 Bay Road.

Sam Bascom (1692–1765) and Mary's Parson's sister Experience (1692–1749) established a tavern and inn nearby, along the Bay Road, for travelers between Brookfield and Northampton—those "after candle-wood, or for the purpose of boxing pine trees for turpentine, for hunting purposes, or to attend the large herds grazing there."

John Smith (1687–1777), elected one of the first deacons at Belchertown, and Elizabeth Hovey (1686–1758) moved slightly west of the Bridgmans (84 Old Bay Road) about 1736 or before, as the home, still standing, is dated to 1728 by the Town. Smith was authorized by the Massachusetts General Court to call the first legislative meeting of Cold Spring (Belchertown) settlers. Ethan Smith was born here, the grandson of John and Elizabeth. At about the same time, several other families, including the aforementioned Dwights, settled in the area or owned land near the Belchertown Common.

The Dwights were considered so-called "river gods," a term scholars use to describe "a network of interrelated gentry families connected by birth and marriage, earned a deified moniker during their mortal lives because they monopolized religion, defense, law, politics, and culture in Connecticut River Valley society." The other previously mentioned first families of Belchertown could be considered de facto members of this group.

Aaron Hannum, son of William Hannum (1690–1755) and Mary Hutchinson (1699–1785) who settled to Belchertown in 1732, and Rachel Smith, daughter of the aforementioned John Smith and Elizabeth Hovey, built a house at Pond Hill in about 1750 (90 Bay Road); his cousin Phineas Hannum and partner Mary Williams built one just south of the center of Dwight (715 Federal Street), in about 1770.

=== Northeast ===
John Ward (1716–1800) and Abigail Heath (1731–1813) settled in northeastern Dwight, along the Jabish Brook, near the Pelham boundary and today's State Route 202, in about 1749. It was the first year of their marriage, and they were among the very first non-indigenous settlers to erect a dwelling-house within the boundaries of today's Dwight. They had 12 children.

Others followed including Elisha Munsell (1728–1810) and Dorothy Redington (1727–1807), newlyweds who settled on the Great Hill by at least 1759 (eastern Dwight) where a cemetery bears the family name. Among the earliest burials in that cemetery is Capt. David Pratt (1742–1806), who came from Ware, Mass., with Lucy Coolidge (1753–1844), settling along the Brook and establishing a notable sawmill in about 1769.

The Town website acknowledges Pratt and states that Belchertown men left, often hurriedly, for campaigns of the American Revolutionary War. "Young Private Pratt of West Hill left his plow in the field and his home unfinished with only a blanket for a door. His young wife with her three small children lay sleepless many nights during his three years' absence."

Pratt is worth mentioning as he was among those who marched to the alarm of April 19, 1775. Pratt served seven years as a sergeant and made captain by war's close; he was at the Battles of Saratoga and the Surrender of Burgoyne. At Stillwater above Albany, a historical narrative goes: "he shot a Hessian across the river, and broke his thigh bone. The Hessian remained in this Country after the war was over, and told David, 'It was a damned good shot.'" Pratt and his wife had 19 children by some accounts.

In January 1787, during the debt crisis, Revolutionary War veteran Daniel Shays marched with many former soldiers, including about 65 Belchertown men, from Pelham to the Springfield Armory in opposition to the state government's increased efforts to collect taxes on both individuals and their trades. They took the road on the eastern edge of Dwight, known today as Daniel Shay's Highway (State Route 202) The prior December, in 1786, about 80 Belchertown men were among the 350 who followed Shays to Worcester to prevent the court from sitting.

Several men who lived in Dwight were jailed, including the tax collector Samuel Wilson, a veteran of the Revolutionary War, for either refusing to collect taxes or being unable to pay. Wilson's farm and lands near today's Wilson Road were confiscated by the Town and sold. He moved to Belcher, New York; some of this family remained in Dwight into the 20th century.

=== First house at Dwight ===
The first structure erected near the center of Dwight was said to be the late Georgian colonial-style home that formerly stood on the northeast corner of Warren Wright Road and Orchard Street. Reputed to have been built in 1750 and operated as a tavern into the mid nineteenth century, the home history at the Stone House Museum in Belchertown states Isaiah Carrier, of Connecticut, as associated with the property in 1769. At the time, the Old Bay Road split near Warren Wright and headed toward Federal St. and into the center of Amherst, making it a good place for an inn and tavern. The home, known later as Colonial Orchards, featured an 8 ft.² chimney and a second-floor ballroom with floorsprings. The home was owned by the Hulst family in the early 20th century and destroyed by fire in 1994; owner Major John C. Topping died in the blaze. Photographs of the home remain at the Stone House Museum.

=== Goodell family ===
Another early homestead erected near what would become the center of Dwight was that of Nathaniel Goodell (1740–1814) and Abigail Chaffee (1737–1811), in about 1765. The couple came with their young children from Woodstock, Connecticut, in 1777. The family was notable for its abolitionism and its members' various accomplishments (architecture, horticulture, photography, medicine and the arts), one of which was the first-person detailed, colorful descriptions of life and people in Logtown in the 19th century, left behind by Ira Chaffee Goodell (1800–1877). Their first dwelling-place was torn down about 1875; the Dwight Station Mini Mart stands roughly in its spot, mimicking its gabled outline. Their second homestead, originally in the Federal style dating to 1833, was erected by L. W. Goodell's father Asahel, and remains on the east side of Federal Street, a few hundred yards north of North Street.

=== Dwight family ===
About four years after Nathaniel Goodell built his homestead, Capt. Justus Dwight (1739–1824) and Sarah Lamb (1737–1832) and their two children—Elihu and Clarissa—settled in a small cabin in Fall 1769 at what would become the center of Dwight. Their son Jonathan was born the following January though Sarah may have returned to their home on the Belchertown Common to give birth.

Their son Nathaniel, born in 1772, was said to be the first non-indigenous child born at Dwight. [Though John Ward, Jr., was born on the eastern edge of Dwight in about 1749.] The family erected a colonial-style home at the intersection of today's Goodell and Federal streets in 1775. That burned in 1870 and an Italianate home was erected in its place that still stands today.

Justus was the third born son of Capt. Nathaniel Dwight Jr., and Hannah Lyman, of Northampton, Mass., mentioned previously. Their son Elijah—Justus' brother—was said to be the first non-Indigenous male child born in all of Belchertown in 1735 though he died after 44 days. [The family, among the so-called "river gods" of the Connecticut River Valley, appear to capture much of the Town's historical narrative.]

Justus became the family's eldest surviving son in 1760 after which his father, in 1765, deeded Justus land in North Belchertown for "love and affection." Justus and Sarah's grandson Harrison would become the stationmaster for whom Dwight's station was named. Harrison's first cousin was John Dwight (1846–1903), the Arm & Hammer and Cow Brand soda manufacturing mogul who left an estate worth more than $265 million today.

Immediately following the Dwights, Levi Arnold (1746–1828), a distant cousin of the British and American military officer Benedict Arnold, came from Smithfield, Rhode Island, about 1770. He put up a small cabin and constructed Dwight's first sawmill, the ruins which remain, damming the Montague Brook at the pond that once existed near the southwest corner of the intersection of North and Federal Streets. His great-grandfather was one of the first white settlers of Woonsocket and built a saw mill there probably in the 1660s; his grandfather John Arnold was a Quaker. His cousin was Seth Arnold, the noted "eclectic physician" and patent medicine manufacturer.

Levi married Anna Aldrich in Smithfield in 1769. She gave birth to eight children, all in Rhode Island in the 70s and 80s. He later married Isabel Aldrich, who had three children by him. He was enumerated on the 1790 Rhode Island census. He established residence in Dwight by the 1810 census and is likely buried (no headstone) at the Dwight Cemetery with three sons—Israel, Ephraim and Willis—as well as children and grandchildren.

Families including Knowlton, Bliss, Chapman, Currier, Wilson and Thayer soon followed and established homes.

=== African Americans ===
An early African American living in the Pond Hill region was Chloe, "a black girl," "of Moses Hannum." She was born about 1766 and died January 11, 1785, of consumption. The status of her freedom is unclear. Hannum (1718–1802) was a son of William and Mary, the early settlers. His home was on present day Hamilton Street; his son's home remains across the road (250 Hamilton Street). The descendants of this family, some of whom remained in Dwight, lived with young African Americans in their homes in the years surrounding the American Civil War, according to several U.S. censuses.

The earliest African Americans living in Dwight may have been several members of Pharaoh family. Listed on the 1810 record of eligible voters in a Belchertown special election for "Logg-town District" is Jephtha Negro, Joseph Faroal, Avery Faroal and Frank Faroal, each listed as "a Negro." The Belchertown spelling of Faroal is likely phonetic for Pharaoh. To be considered an eligible voter in the state, one did not necessarily have to be white, but had to own property.

Jephtha Pharaoh, born in 1775 or before, "often wore a uniform" and was a servant in the home of politician Ebenezer Mattoon, of Amherst, which is on the northern boundary of Dwight. Pharaoh and his family's freedom status was unknown. He married Margaret Sash; their children: Adeline, Dolly, Margaret, Sylvia and William. Jephtha died in 1840 or before.

Listed immediately preceding the Faroals in the 1810 record is Aldrich Arnold, a son of previously mentioned Levi Arnold. Listed immediately preceding Jephtha is Titus Bliss, the firstborn son of Ebenezer Bliss and Abigail Parsons, newlyweds who came to Dwight from Warren in about 1772.

Also upon the 1810 list of eligible voters in Belchertown, "Upper end of the town District," is John Freeman (1755–1823), a Black man, and his son Ira. John purchased 25 acres of land from Moses and Joshua Hannum for $100 that year, which made him a landowner and eligible to vote. He was a veteran of the American Revolution and served with a Connecticut regiment. Freeman married Dorcas Green on February 14, 1793, recorded in the Belchertown records, and they had at least nine children. He died in 1823. The couple are buried in the Lake Vale Cemetery, or upon their nearby lands. Their son, daughter and grandson are buried at Lake Vale. Several generations continued to reside in the Pond Hill area of Belchertown into the early 1900s.

During the early years of the 19th century, the records of the Second Congregational Church of the East Amherst included Black people. The records contain marriage and death entries for people who had no relationship with the church, including those who lived in Dwight.

=== Railroad ===
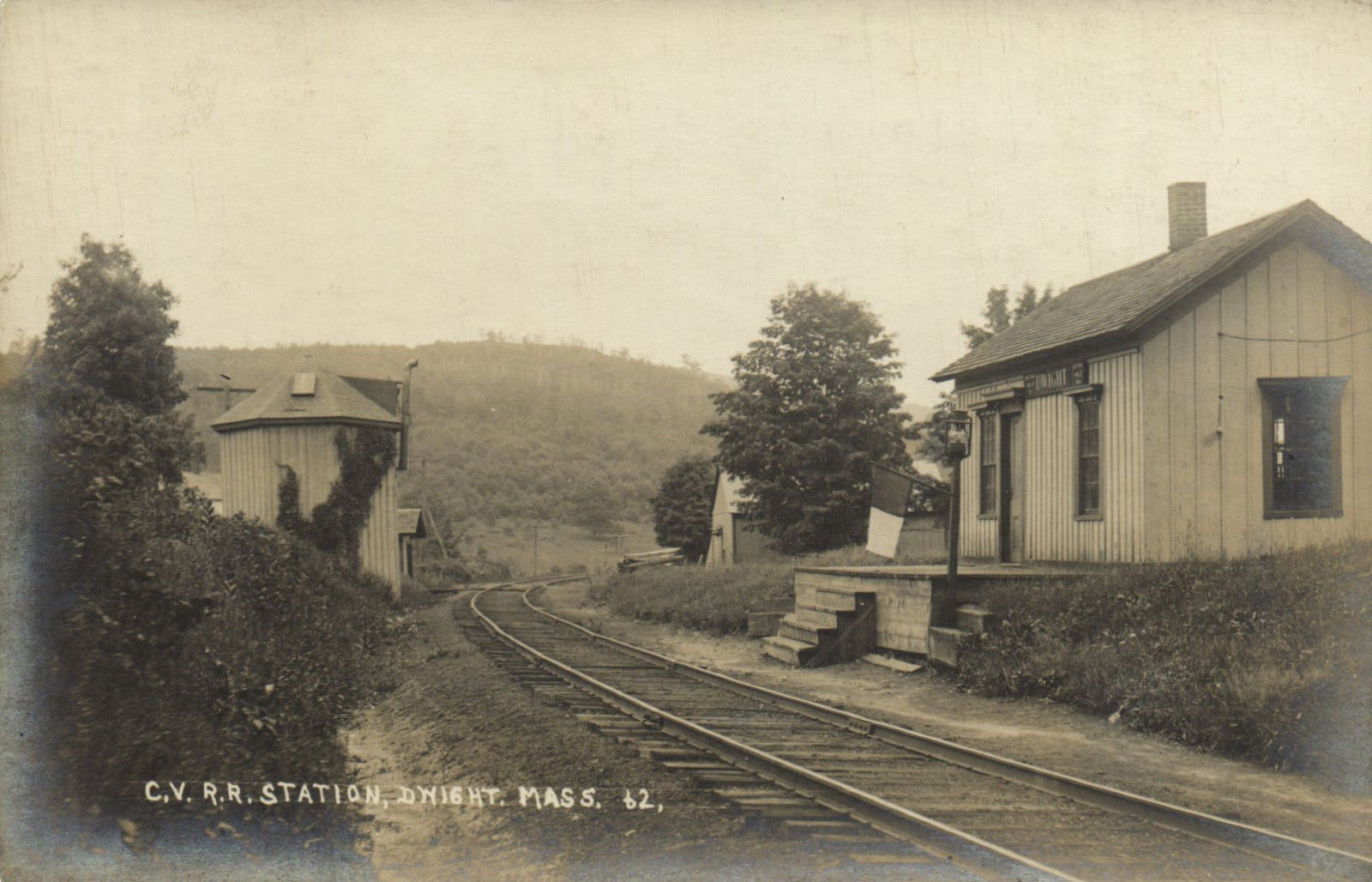
Dwight Station (right) & Water Tower (left) in North Belchertown (Dwight), Massachusetts. From an undated postcard. The view is looking east from the crossing on Federal Street. The structures were erected by the railroad agent H. D. Dwight about 1857 on what became the Central Vermont Railroad, at Federal Street, immediately north of Goodell Street. A sawmill beyond the tower (on the Scarborough Brook) supplied wood for locomotives. W. M. Goodell was the agent from 1885 until 1933 when passenger service ceased. The structures were removed by the late 1940s. Dwight at MP 103.7; Belchertown at MP 108.4.

Harrison Dunbar Dwight (1806–1878), great-grandson of Capt. Nathaniel Dwight, was born here, the fourth generation of the family to be associated with the place. He became the first railroad agent on the Amherst & Belchertown Railroad, which began service in May 1853 and connected the region with the Atlantic Ocean seaport at New London, Connecticut, and markets in New York City and further west.

The Dwight Farm in North Belchertown was about 400 acres at this time. Harrison Dwight donated land upon which he erected the train station (built about 1857) and the water tower for the locomotives. He developed the adjacent sawmill on the Scarborough Brook, an ostensible monopoly on supplying wood to the railroad. He also, like many in Town, made carriages. The village, up to that point known as Logtown, afterward became known as Dwight's Station in his honor and of the noted family (his second cousin was theologian and Harvard President Timothy Dwight IV). Dwight Chapel took the name as well. The tradition of local mills in Dwight supplying timbers for shipbuilding continued, an industry enhanced by the railroad.

=== Pansy Park ===
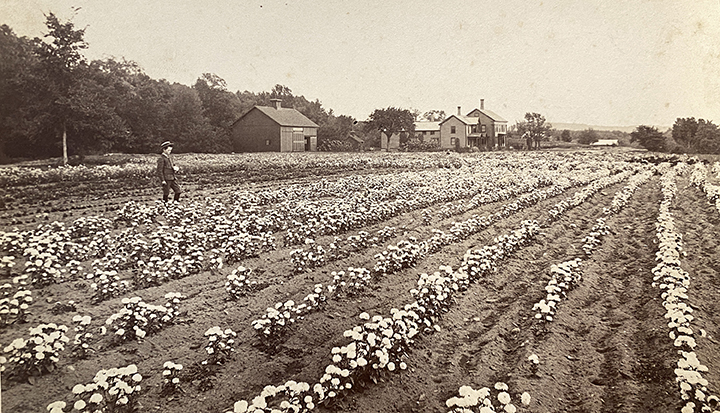
Pansy Park, North Belchertown, Dwight Village, Massachusetts. Circa 1885. Goodell Home in the background. The Home still stands today at 1100 Federal St. Photograph taken by L. W. Goodell, Founder of Pansy Park. Courtesy Special Collections, Jones Library, Amherst, Mass.

Lafayette Washington Goodell (1851–1920) began a flower seed business on his father's "rundown" farm at Dwight in 1868 with a $25 investment. He erected greenhouses and ponds for aquatic plants and called the place Pansy Park, which "drew summertime travelers intent on witnessing the gorgeous floral displays." It featured a wide array of thousands of popular and exotic plants like pansies, petunias, pinks and asters. These included Emperor William's blue corn-flower, and in the aquatic gardens on the site, the world's second largest water lily, the Victoria Regia, from the Amazon. By 1890, he was said to have more than 50,000 customers; some 200,000 catalogs went out in one year alone, according to newspaper reports.

The Goodell home at Pansy Park, erected in 1833, remains in Dwight, north of the Dwight Station Mini Mart. It was sold out of the family in 1928. It has by turns been a small inn, a tavern, a dance and music hall and several restaurants. The original Goodell homestead, from about 1765, stood at the southeast corner of North and Federal Streets, until its removal in about 1875.

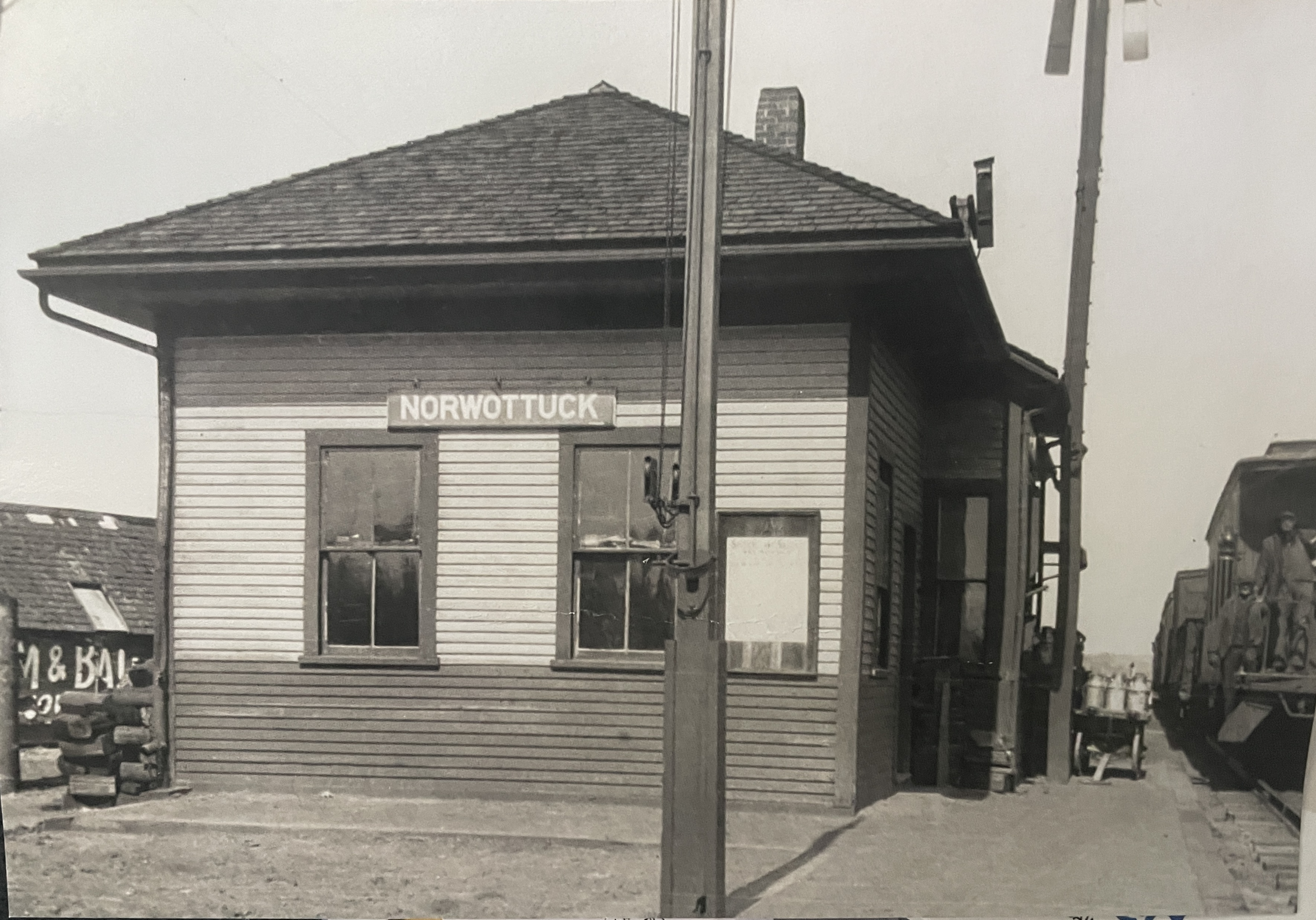
Norwottuck Station, near Dwight, South Amherst, Mass., Boston and Maine Railroad, about 1917. North of Station Road, at the R.R. Crossing, on the Norwottuck Branch Rail Trail

=== Second railroad ===
In 1887, the Central Massachusetts opened a rail line through Dwight, later acquired by the Boston & Maine Railroad; its flag stop at Dwight was called "Pansy Park." This meant the village now was the site of two railways, their tracks sometimes just 50 feet apart. Some 22 freight and passenger trains went through the village daily.

To the northwest, the Boston and Maine erected a depot in South Amherst, called Norwottuck Station, near where Station Road crosses the railroad tracks today.

In 1883, a small post office was established at Dwight, the second in Belchertown. It closed in 1928. Passenger traffic to the village ceased in 1933 after the death of Wesley Goodell, the station agent. Freight traffic, including milk from local suppliers, and limited passenger let-offs at Dwight (on the Central Vermont line) continued into the 1950s. The Boston and Maine tracks were pulled up from the 1940s into the 1980s and the rail-bed became the Mass Central Rail Trail.

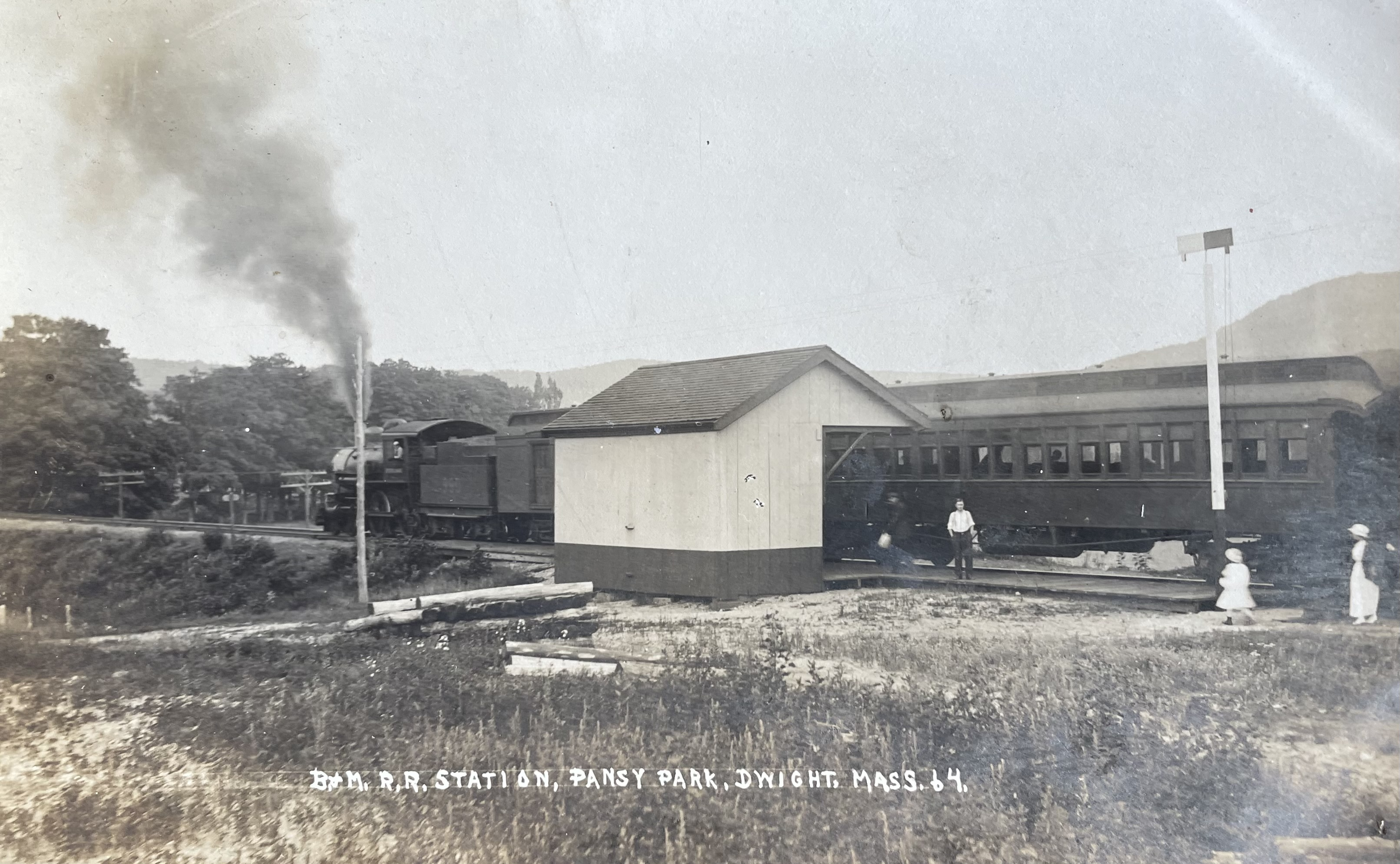
Pansy Park, Flag Stop Station, Boston and Maine R.R., North Belchertown, Dwight, Massachusetts. Undated postcard, Circa 1900.

== Schools ==
Three schools existed historically in the region. The first was near the center and called by its popular name Logtown school, then Union and later Dwight school—there were five one-room Dwight schoolhouses between the years 1780 and 1953. In the northeast was the Great Hill school, off of Gulf Road, and in the southeast, Prospect school, near Daniel Shay's Highway (Route 202).

The last Dwight schoolhouse closed in 1953 and is today incorporated into a home near the intersection of Federal Street and Gulf Road. A fourth school, Pond Hill or Lake Vale, was existent to the southeast at Pond Hill. There are no schools remaining in Dwight. Most are closer to the Common.

== Chapel ==
Susan Dickinson, sister-in-law of the noted poet, held Sunday school in the brick schoolhouse at Dwight in the 1880s and brought food and clothing to the poor in the neighborhood. She began a penny collection among the children to purchase a pump organ. The cornerstone of Union Chapel, later called Dwight Chapel, was laid in 1886; it was dedicated March 23, 1887.

Built in the Queen Ann style, it was established as non-sectarian, by the Union Church Society of North Belchertown, which soon approved its association with Methodists. Financier and railroad tycoon Arthur Curtiss James held Sunday school at the chapel as a student at Amherst College under the guidance of Mrs. Dickinson. He was among many who donated funds to help refurbish the Chapel in the early 20th century. Louisa Town Filer (1810–1905) was among the first organists at the chapel; her husband, Humphrey Taylor Filer (1802–1857), owner of a large carriage manufactory in Town, reportedly gifted a brougham to Queen Victoria.

Annual community fundraising dinners were held in the grove across Federal Street from the chapel for many years. These gatherings featured dignitaries from surrounding towns, coronet and organ duets, gospel music and singing by children. "This event was of enough importance so that the half-fair tickets on the C.V.R.R. (Central Vermont Railroad) were granted from Amherst and Belchertown to those wishing to attend the social outing and dinner." Today the chapel is part of Christ Community Church, also in Dwight.

== Cemeteries ==
Sarah Dwight, who died at age 11 in 1790, was buried on her parents' land (Justus and Sarah) in what became the community burial ground known as the Union Cemetery, today as the Dwight Cemetery. It lies less than a quarter-mile northeast of the Dwight Chapel and is managed by the Town.

Munsell Cemetery, about two miles northeast of the center of Dwight, opened in 1795 after the burial of 21-year-old David Pratt Jr. Known also as Evergreen and West Hill, it is managed by the Town of Belchertown.

Samuel Stebbins came to the Pond Hill region with his brother Benjamin and died shortly after arriving in the year 1732. Consequently, he was among the first burials at what today is Lake Vale Cemetery, about two miles south of Dwight center, which was acquired by the Town in 1766.

== Notable people ==
- Henry Ward Beecher, a minister among the most famous men of the 19th century, gave his first sermon at the schoolhouse at Dwight in 1831.
- Throop Chapman, American revolutionary war soldier (early Dwight settler, served with Belchertown men in the Revolution, founded Readsboro, Vermont)
- Justus Dwight, politician and Antifederalist (lived and died in Dwight)
- Josiah Gilbert Holland, American author (born in Dwight)
- Ira Chaffee Goodell, American painter (born in Dwight)
- Lafayette Washington Goodell, horticulturalist, founder of Pansy Park
- Nathaniel Dudley Goodell, American architect (born in Dwight)
- Ellen Goodell Smith, American physician and author (born and died in Dwight)

== In film ==
In the 2018 film Wild Nights with Emily, the character playing the Springfield Daily Republican Editor Samuel Bowles asks Susan Huntington Gilbert Dickinson, poet Emily Dickinson's sister-in-law, whether she is still teaching Sunday school to the "poor children" in "Logtown," which is today known as Dwight.
