= Ware Millyard Historic District =

Historic district in Massachusetts, United States

- U.S. National Register of Historic Places
- U.S. Historic district
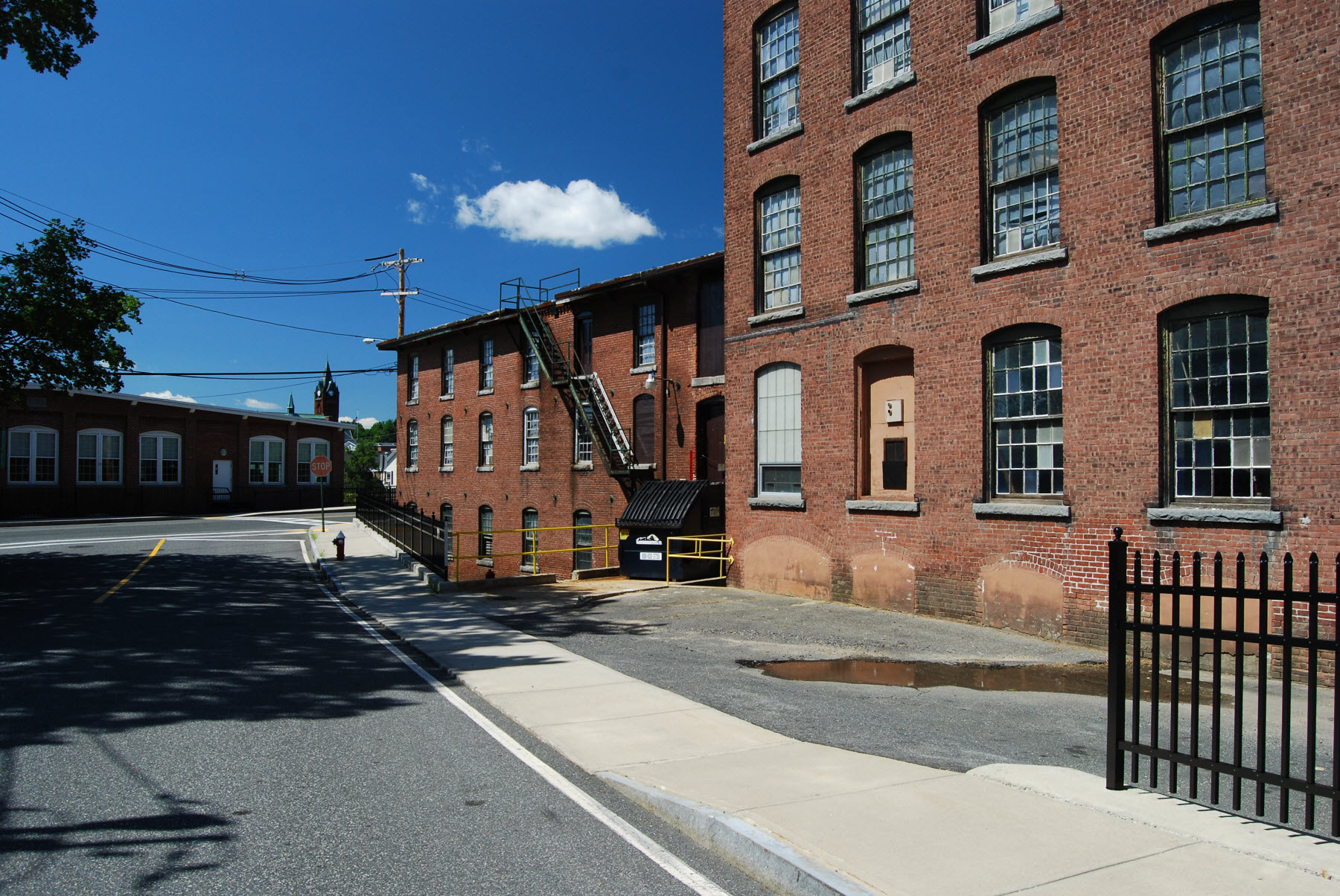

- Location within Massachusetts Location within the United States
- Location: Ware, Massachusetts
- Coordinates: 42°15′33″N 72°14′17″W
- Area: 42 acres (17 ha)
- Built: 1825
- Architect: Eugene C. Gardner et al.
- Architectural style: Late 19th And 20th Century Revivals, Greek Revival, Late Victorian
- NRHP reference No.: 86003508
- Added to NRHP: November 21, 1986

The Ware Millyard Historic District encompasses a 19th-century mill complex and industrial mill village in the town of Ware, Massachusetts. It is roughly bounded by South Street, the Ware River, Upper Dam Complex, Park Street, Otis Avenue and Church Street. The area includes surviving mill buildings, the oldest of which date to the 1840s, and a collection of tenement-style housing built for the millworkers, built between 1845 and the 1880s.

== History ==
The Ware Millyard area first saw industrial use in the 18th century, when Jabez Olmsted established a sawmill at the falls of the Ware River. Capitalizing on the innovations in textile manufacturing that led to the establishment of Lowell, Massachusetts, investors in 1821 purchased mill privileges at the falls, and incorporated the Ware Manufacturing Company in 1823. The company platted out the area, with the mills along the river, and a dam and holding pond upriver. Housing for workers was planned for a street grid lying roughly north of the mill complex. Elements of this plan are still visible in the architecture of the mill complex, street plan, and the residential buildings on the streets. Although elements of the water power infrastructure date to this period, only one building, the company office, survives from this period. All of the major mill buildings date to later in the 19th century. The mill was the region's largest employer for nearly a century.

The district was listed on the National Register of Historic Places in 1986.

== See also ==
- Otis Company Mill No. 1, separately listed and included in this district
- Ware Center Historic District
- Church Street Historic District (Ware, Massachusetts)
- National Register of Historic Places listings in Hampshire County, Massachusetts
- List of mill towns in Massachusetts
