= Ira Chaffee Goodell =

American painter (1800–1877)

Ira Chaffee Goodell (July 3, 1800–April 19, 1877) was an American folk artist and portrait painter.

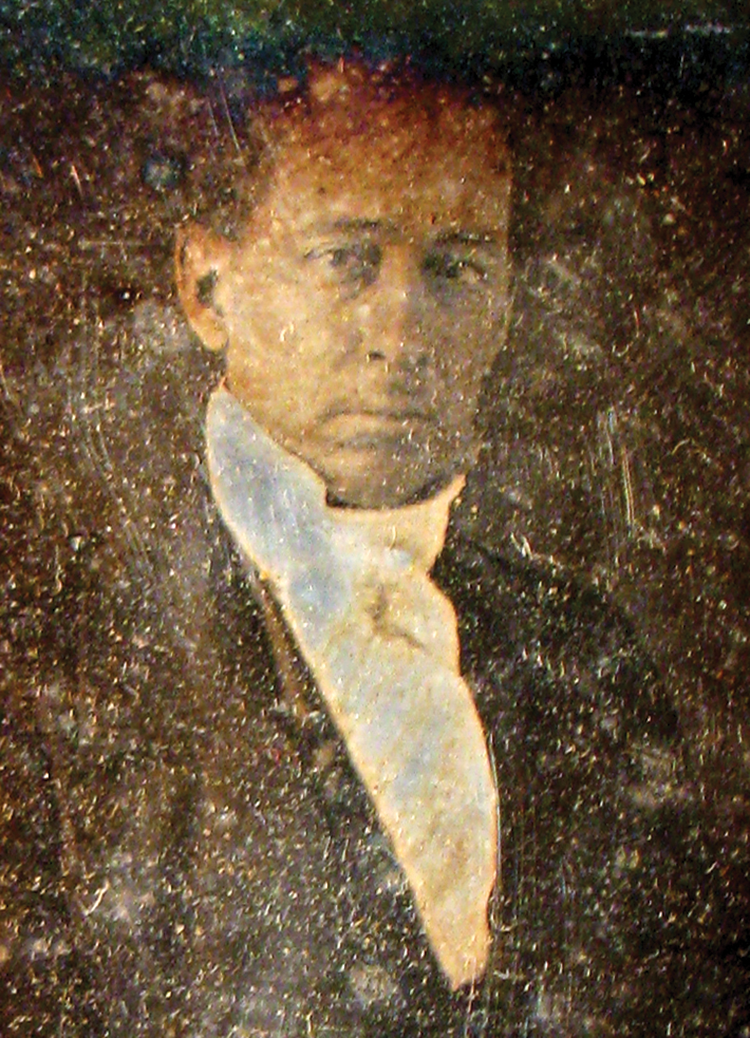
Daguerreotype of Ira Chaffee Goodell (1800–1877), 2 5/8 in × 2 1/8 in (67 mm × 54 mm). A note written in Goodell's hand is attached to the case, "I.C. Goodell/Taken Nov. 1848./Presented to/ his Brother/Marcus Goodell/1873."

He was born on July 3, 1800, in Dwight, Massachusetts, North Belchertown, the first of the twelve children of Moses Goodell (1777-1854) and Susannah T. Pettengill (1778-1848).

He obtained a common school education locally at Dwight, trained as an attorney, then worked as a schoolteacher and in the carriage trade before studying art and moving to New York. His brother was architect Nathaniel Dudley Goodell.

He married Adelia Mary Cronin on May 31, 1832, in Hudson, New York. Their first child, Angelo Byron, was born on May 30, 1833. They removed to New York City the following year on April 8, 1834. Angelo died that July. "Delia" had six children most of whom died.

Goodell painted hundreds of portraits, including those of family members in Belchertown. As late as 1874, he reportedly charged the same fee of $10 per portrait that he had charged forty years prior.

"In this City, thirty years ago there were nearly two hundred Portrait Painters," Ira wrote in a letter to his sister-in-law. "Now, I doubt if there is fifty, and nearly all of these are of the first class artists and are patronised by the Wealthy, paying from three to five hundred dollars apiece.—I think Hard Times and Photography, has Slain Common Portrait Painters."

The family lived in numerous apartments across Lower Manhattan for the remainder of their lives. Ira participated in many mid-nineteenth century "intellectual pursuits" such as phrenology, mesmerism, clairvoyance and phonography.

Ira painted an indelible portrait of early to mid-nineteenth century life in the well-defined, rural Massachusetts village into which he was born by writing hundreds of colorful letters, many of which are preserved. He captured the personalities and events of his life and wrote to family members to whom he remained devoted, especially his nephew Lafayette W. Goodell.

His artwork continues to be collected today.

== Goodell family ==
Ira's grandfather was Nathaniel Goodell (1740-1814), who came from Woodstock, Connecticut with Abigail Chaffee (1737-1811) and their young children to settle in North Belchertown by 1777, the year Ira's father was born. Nathaniel provided service during the American Revolutionary War and was among the 65 Belchertown men who signed an oath of allegiance after many marched through Belchertown with Daniel Shays during Shays Rebellion.

Their farm was "known as a stopping place for the circuit riders and other church officials, beginning about 1808. Nathaniel and his family were extremely hospitable to the itinerant ministers, and they came from miles around to stay all night at the Goodell Homestead when traveling through the countryside."

Spanning four generations in Dwight, the family was notable for its abolitionism and interest in religion, phrenology, mesmerism, free love and spiritualism and its members' various accomplishments in architecture, agriculture, horticulture, textile refurbishment, photography, journalism, writing, medicine and the arts.

Ira was born in the family's first homestead (built ca. 1765 and demolished ca. 1875); the Dwight Station Mini Mart stands roughly in its spot, mimicking its gabled outline. The second Goodell home was erected in 1833 and remains on Federal Street, north of the Mini Mart. The family held a large reunion here in 1873. It was sold out of the family in 1928.

== Death ==
In the 1830s three of Ira's children and three of his sisters died, primarily of consumption (tuberculosis).

In 1840, his brother Newton Franklin Washington Goodell died at age 18. Ira wrote the following tribute carved upon his brother's headstone in the Dwight Cemetery:

"This monument was erected by I.C. Goodell of New York, in token of the affectionate regard and sincere esteem which he entertained for his departed brother, whose virtues and warm friendship claim the tribute of a tear. His amenity of deportment secured to him the love of his fellow students; his untiring perseverance in study was proverbial; his scholarship was acknowledged by all; his strong attachment to his acquaintances cemented the bonds of love and friendship; and his early exit is mourned by all who knew him. Stranger or friend, come, and drop a tear over the tomb of genius, talent and worth.

'There is a calm, for those who weep,

A rest for the weary pilgrims found; And while the mouldering ashes sleep Low in the ground,

The soul of origin divine, God's glorious image freed from clay In heaven's eternal sphere shall shine A star of day. -Montgomery.'"

His wife "Delia" died in New York City on November 17, 1866. She was 56 years old.

Their son, Angelo Newton Franklin Goodell, was a notable child prodigy who performed publicly with phonography, the phonetic system of shorthand. Angelo died at Ira's West Village home at age 28 in 1871.

Six years later, Ira Goodell died. It occurred on April 19, 1877. He was 76 years old. Ira is buried with his wife and children in Green-Wood Cemetery in Brooklyn.

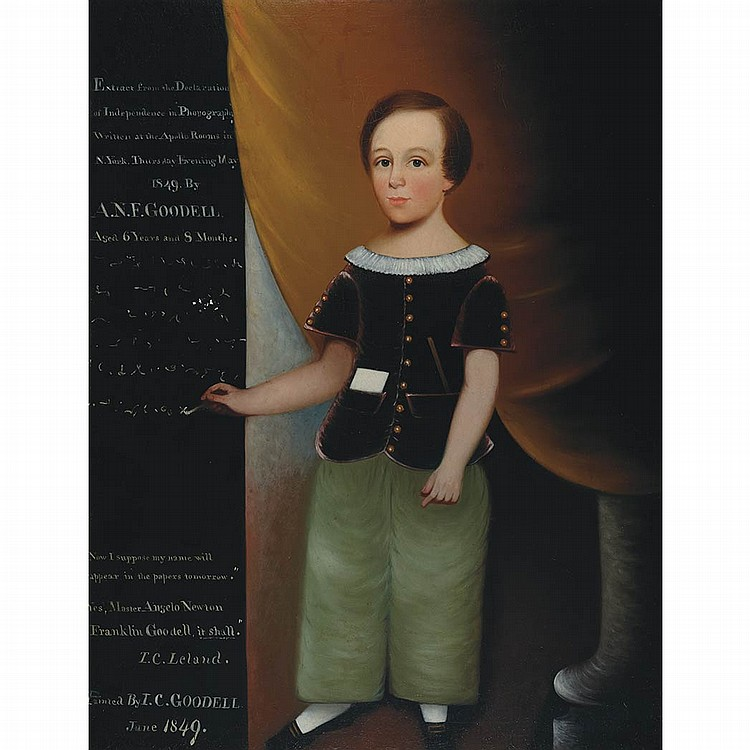
Ira Chaffee Goodell American, 1800-1875 Portrait of Master Angelo Newton Franklin Goodell, 1849 Inscribed Extract from the Declaration/of Independence in Phonography/Written at the Apollo Rooms in/N. York, Thursday Evening May/1849. By/A.N.F. Goodell./Aged 6 years and 8 months.
