= Ware Center Historic District =

Historic district in Massachusetts, United States

- U.S. National Register of Historic Places
- U.S. Historic district
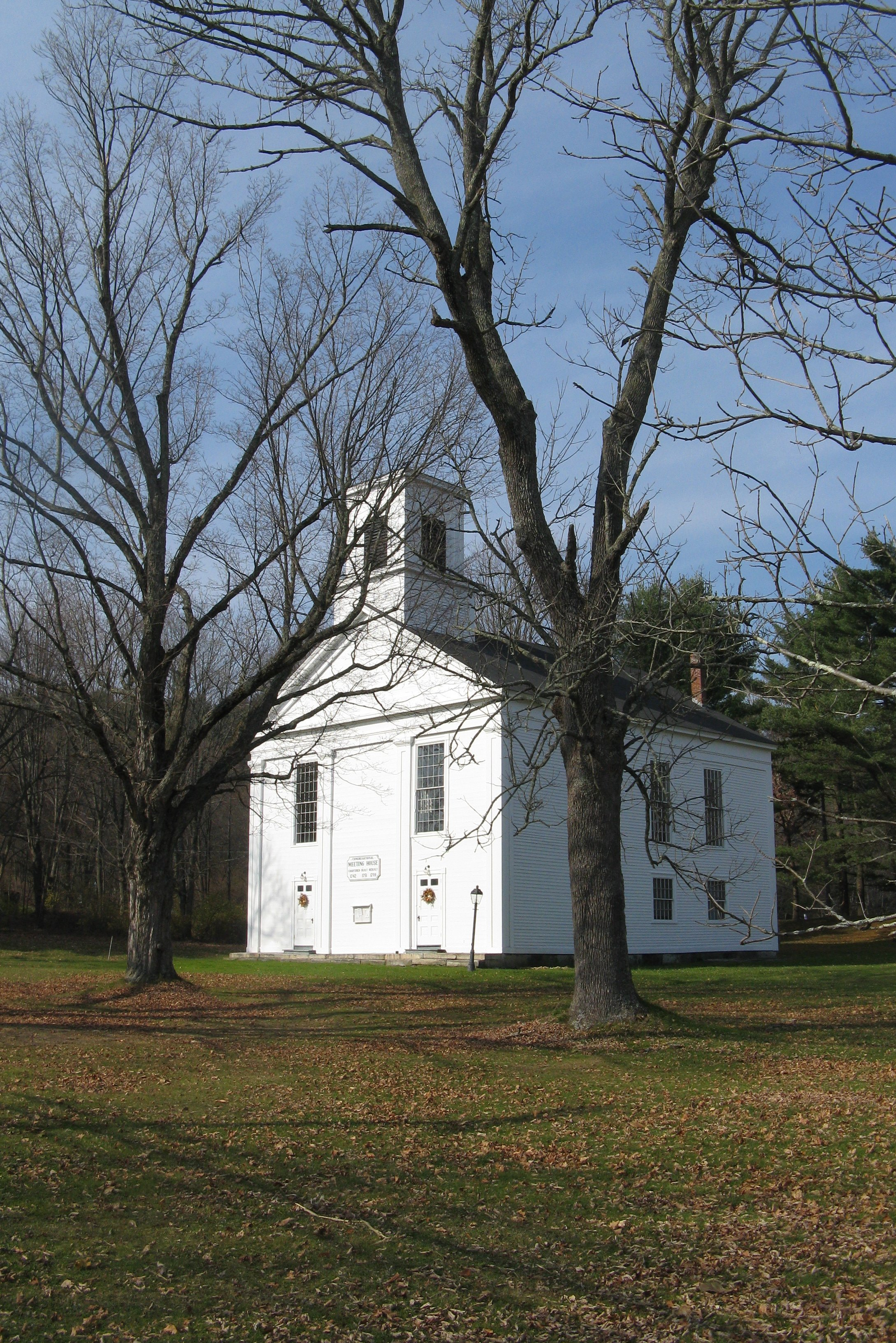
- Congregational Meeting House

- Location within Massachusetts Location within the United States
- Location: MA 9 at Greenwich Plains Rd., Ware, Massachusetts
- Coordinates: 42°15′40″N 72°16′42″W
- Area: 80 acres (32 ha)
- Architect: Baxter, Ezekiel; et al.
- Architectural style: Greek Revival, Georgian, Federal
- NRHP reference No.: 86001013
- Added to NRHP: May 8, 1986

The Ware Center Historic District encompasses the historic early center of Ware, Massachusetts. Centered at the junction of Massachusetts Route 9 with Greenwich Plains Road, it is a linear district extending about 0.5 miles (0.80 km) along Route 9 in either direction. Most of the structures in the district were built between 1760 and 1860, although there are some 20th century intrusions. The area was the center of town civic and commercial activity until the 1820s, when villages serving industry became more important. The district was listed on the National Register of Historic Places in 1986.

== Description and history ==
Ware was settled in the 1717 and incorporated in 1775. Its town center was laid out in 1760, on land belonging to one of its early large landowners. The first colonial meeting house was built in that year, near the geographic center of the town, and the road network developed around access to this area from the corners of the town. It had services typical of a town center, including a tavern and blacksmithy, but other industrial activity was modest, and was eclipsed in the 19th century by the industrialization of Factory Village, where the modern town center is located. The village retained much of its early Georgian and Federal character in part because the economic focus in the town moved with the advent of industrialization elsewhere in the town during the 19th century.

The district is basically linear, with the First Congregational Church near its center. That church was built in 1799, near the site of the 1760 meeting house. The only other non-residential building in the district is a former district school built in 1872. The oldest building in the district is a farmhouse located at the corner of Walker and Doane RD, 42 Doane rd, this expansive single-family house was built in 1732. There is a building in the district, built in 1759 known as the Ezra Thayer House, a well-preserved Georgian house that was built for the town's first settled minister. It is one of four houses in the village built for ministers. There is one house, built about 1780 and subsequently enlarged, that served as a tavern for many years.

== See also ==
- Church Street Historic District (Ware, Massachusetts)
- Ware Millyard Historic District
- National Register of Historic Places listings in Hampshire County, Massachusetts
