= Otis Company Mill No. 1 =

- U.S. National Register of Historic Places
- U.S. Historic district – Contributing property
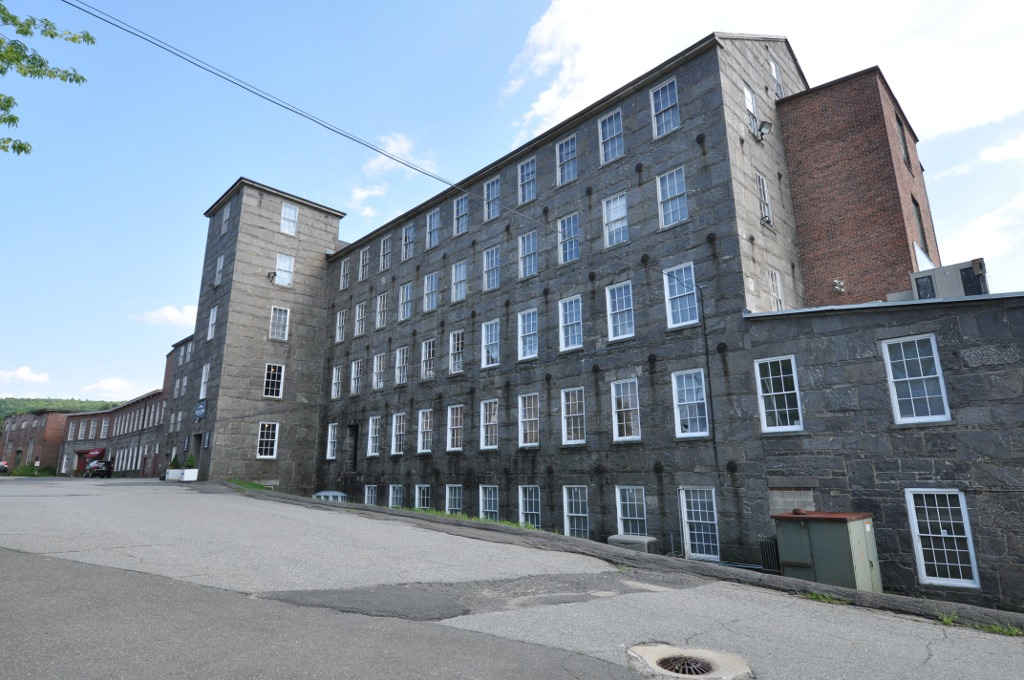
- Otis Company Mill No. 1 in 2014

- Location within Massachusetts Location within the United States
- Location: East Main St. Ware, Massachusetts
- Coordinates: 42°15′31″N 72°14′20″W
- Area: 1.02 acres (0.41 ha)
- Built: 1845
- Architect: Brown, Joseph
- Architectural style: Greek Revival
- Part of: Ware Millyard Historic District (ID86003508)
- NRHP reference No.: 82001909

Significant dates
- Added to NRHP: May 2, 1982
- Designated CP: November 21, 1986

Otis Company Mill No. 1 is a historic mill on E. Main Street in Ware, Massachusetts, United States. Built in 1845, it is one of the best-preserved stone mills in western Massachusetts, and a rare surviving example of a large mill from the pre-turbine phase of industrialization. The building was listed on the National Register of Historic Places in 1982. It was further listed as a contributing property to the Ware Millyard Historic District in 1986.

== Description and history ==
The Otis Company Mill No. 1 stands on the east side of the main village of Ware, between East Main Street and the Ware River east of South Street. It is a five-story mill building fashioned out of coursed stone, and was built in 1845. It is a rectangular structure, topped by a gable roof, with projecting stairwell sections in roughly the middle of both of its long sides. The mill presents four stories to the street, owing the sloping terrain of the riverfront lot. Iron tie rods are found in patterns on the building exterior; these provide stability for the wooden elements of the floor supports.

The mill was probably built by Belchertown mill builder Nathaniel Dudley Goodell, and is the only stone mill in the town. It is one of a small number of mills built in western Massachusetts on the Rhode Island model of mills, and is one of the only ones to date before the introduction of turbines into the water power system. The mill was built for the Otis Company, which initially manufactured woven cotton fabric, but later branched out into underwear. The company was Ware's largest employer for about 100 years.

== See also ==
- National Register of Historic Places listings in Hampshire County, Massachusetts
