= Justus Dwight =

Politician and Antifederalist (1739–1824)

Justus Dwight (January 13, 1739—July 27, 1824) was a Massachusetts politician and Anti-Federalist. He was a member of the Dwight family.

Born in 1739 in Cold Spring (Belchertown, Massachusetts), he was the third of seven males and two females born to Nathaniel Dwight (1712-1784) and Hannah Lyman (1708-1792) though he became the eldest surviving male, at age 21, after the deaths of his brothers.

He was educated by his father and undertook working with him, becoming a surveyor himself.

Justus married Sarah Lamb (1737–1832) on January 17, 1763. They were among the first to settle about 5 miles north of the Common in Dwight, due in part to "great contention" in the Church. This was in the year 1769, and upon lands given to him by his father. He built a large Federal-style home and barns in about 1775, which burned to the ground in about 1871.

He was paid by the Town for serving in the American Revolutionary War in 1776 though he paid a substitute who went on the Invasion of Quebec. In his journal, he wrote that he believed that it was too early for the American colonies to separate from Britain.

He was elected Town clerk in 1785 and representative to the State General Court in 1788. The following year the Town voted not to send a representative. He was elected as Town selectman from 1789 to 1794, 1796, 1799 and 1800.

In 1787, he was elected Town delegate to the State convention in Boston on ratification of the Constitution. On February 6, 1788, along with a majority of Hampshire County Towns, he opposed adopting the Constitution, fearing the new government would be too powerful and threaten individual liberties. Massachusetts voted to adopt. Justus authored the only known existing Massachusetts Anti-Federalist journal.

Justus and Sarah's son, Nathaniel Dwight, was the first president of the Belchertown Historical Association in 1903. Their grandson, Harrison Dunbar Dwight, succeeded the farm of his grandparents and became the first station agent of the village of Dwight on the Belchertown and Amherst Railroad when it opened in 1853.

Justus' parents were among the first to settle Cold Spring (Belchertown), near the Common, in 1731.

Justus and Sarah Dwight had eight children, six of whom lived into adulthood: Elihu, Clarissa, Jonathan, Nathaniel, Daniel and Justus Jr.

Justus died at age 85 in 1824 and Sarah died at age 94 in 1832. They are buried on what used to be their lands, in today's Dwight Cemetery, with their daughter Sarah, 11, who was likely the first to be laid to rest there in 1790.
