= Alexander Assefa =

American politician

Member of the Nevada Assembly from the 42nd district
- In office November 7, 2018 – January 11, 2021
- Preceded by: Irene Bustamante Adams
- Succeeded by: Tracy Brown-May

Personal details
- Born: 1983 (age 42–43) Dodola, Ethiopia
- Party: Democratic
- Education: Averett University (BA)

Alexander Assefa (born 1983) is an American politician and former member of the Nevada Assembly from the 42nd district.

== Early life ==
Assefa was born in Dodola, Ethiopia in 1983. He earned a B.A. in political science from Averett University in Danville, Virginia.

== Career ==
Assefa is a licensed pilot. Assefa also worked as a political advisor for the Ethiopian Community Center of Las Vegas. In 2018, Assefa was elected to the Nevada Assembly, where he has been representing the 42nd district since November 7, 2018. Assefa resigned from the legislature on January 11, 2021, amidst investigation over campaign finances.

The Clark County Commission appointed Tracy Brown-May to serve the remainder of the term.

== Criminal charges ==
In May 2020, during an investigation, law enforcement raided Assefa's house. On March 17, 2021, Assefa faced fourteen criminal charges filed by the Nevada Attorney General's office in the Las Vegas Justice Court. These criminal charges include false information about his residency and campaign expenses.

He pled no contest and was sentenced to three years of probation. His felony conviction will be dismissed if he successfully completes three years probation. (2023)

== Personal life ==
Assefa is married to Zenash Mebratu.
