= Tracy Brown-May =

American politician from Nevada (born 1967)

Member of the Nevada Assembly from the 42nd district
- Incumbent
- Assumed office February 2, 2021
- Preceded by: Alexander Assefa

Personal details
- Born: 1967 (age 58–59) Holyoke, Massachusetts, U.S.
- Party: Democratic
- Education: College of Southern Nevada (AA)

Tracy Brown-May (born 1967) is an American politician serving as a member of the Nevada Assembly from the 42nd district. She was appointed to the seat after incumbent Democrat Alexander Assefa resigned.

== Early life and education ==
Brown-May was born in Holyoke, Massachusetts and raised in Ware, Massachusetts. After graduating from Ware Junior Senior High School, she moved to Las Vegas. Brown-May earned an associate degree in political science and government from the College of Southern Nevada in 2015. She is enrolled as a student at Northeastern University.

== Career ==
From 1996 to 2001, Brown-May was the employee development manager of Sam's Town Hotel and Gambling Hall. In 2001, she joined Opportunity Village, a non-profit organization for adults with intellectual disabilities, as special assistant to the president and CEO. Since 2017, she has worked as the organization's director of advocacy and government relations chair.
