= Ware Junior Senior High School =

Coordinates: 42.2512°N 72.2629°W

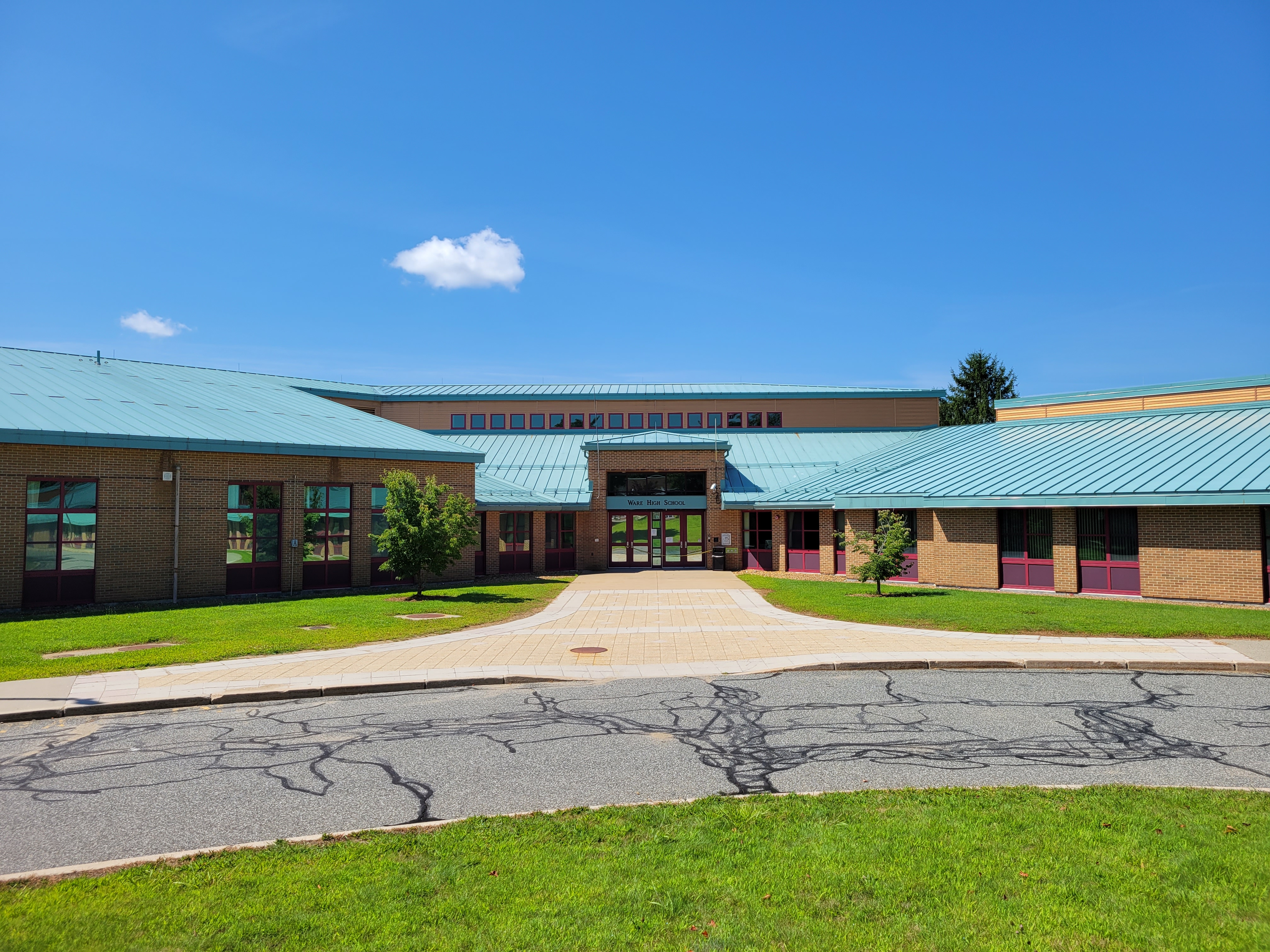
- Ware High School in 2023

Location
- 237 West Street; Ware, Massachusetts 01082; United States

Information
- Type: Public secondary school
- School district: Ware School District
- Principal: Megan Sears
- Grades: 7–12
- Colors: Green and white
- Team name: Indians
- Website: www.wareps.org

Ware Junior Senior High School (WJSHS) is a public school serving grades 7–12 for the Ware School District in Ware, Massachusetts. Two other schools which are part of the Ware School District are on the same campus as WJSHS. Ware Middle School and Stanley M. Koziol Elementary.

== History ==
The old Ware High School building was erected in 1893 and is part of the Church Street Historic District.

== Athletics ==
The Ware Indians are part of the Pioneer Valley Interscholastic Athletic Conference. School colors are green and white. It has a baseball team, a football team, and a cheerleading squad. In 2009, the school's football team won the Division 4 Western Massachusetts Super Bowl.

The now-defunct Holyoke Hurricanes played their Independent Women's Football League home games at the school in 2008 and 2009.

== Notable alumni ==
- Tracy Brown-May, member of the Nevada Assembly
- Karen S. Lynch, businesswoman and president of CVS Health
- Billy Jo Robidoux, Major League Baseball player

== See also ==
- List of secondary school sports team names and mascots derived from indigenous peoples
