= John Brown Smith =

American utopianist and developer of shorthand (1837–1917)

John B. Smith
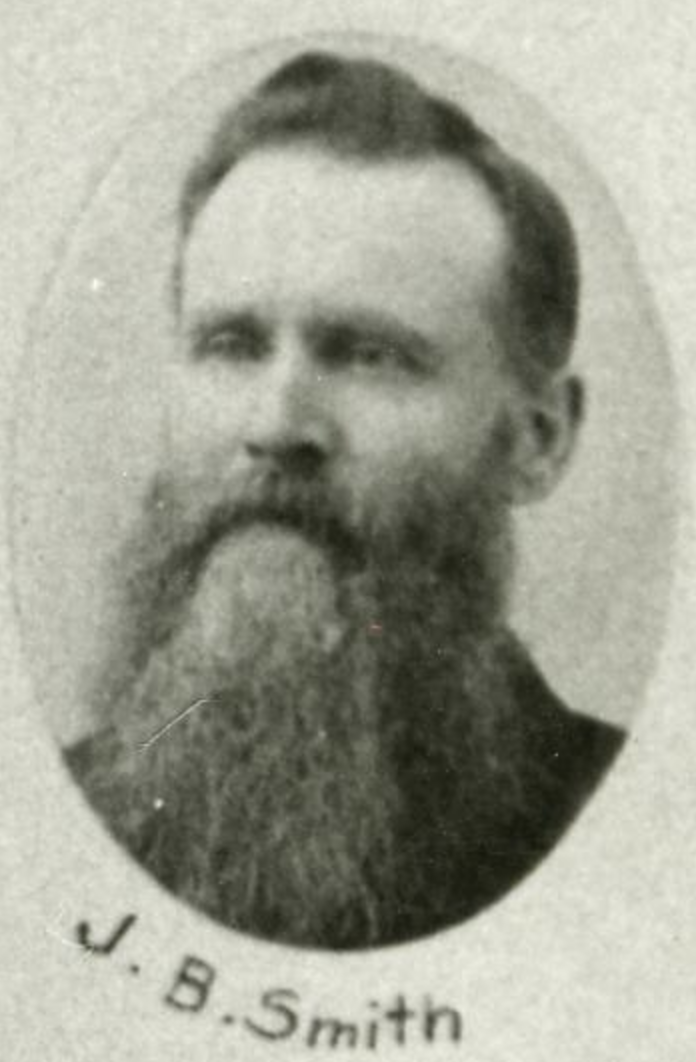
- Smith in 1893

Member of the Washington House of Representatives for the 17th district
- In office 1893–1895; 1897–1899

Personal details
- Born: October 30, 1837 London, Upper Canada (present-day Ontario)
- Died: April 4, 1917 (aged 79) Orondo, Washington, United States
- Party: Populist

John Brown Smith (October 30, 1837 – April 4, 1917) was an American doctor, author, mutualist anarchist theorist, tax resister, and developer of shorthand.

He served in the Washington House of Representatives.

Smith was born in Canada and moved to Minnesota at age 17. In August 1862 he enlisted in a company of the 10th Minnesota and served through the American Civil War, being mustered out in July 1865. After the war, he turned his attention to medicine. In 1867, he married Dr. Ellen H. Goodell.

== Tax resistance ==
In 1879–80, Smith spent nearly a year in jail for refusing to pay a $2 city poll tax in Belchertown, Massachusetts. The fact that his imprisonment cost the town far more than the town would have recovered from his tax had he paid it made the case a contentious one. Smith wrote of his civil disobedience:

I am not a citizen of the United States, and consequently am taxed without representation, which is quite contrary to the genius of republican institutions. I believe in self-government through love, as against the old forms of government by force, and as a natural consequence cannot pay this tax without violating my conscientious convictions. I trust that the descendants of the Pilgrim Fathers still have left enough of respect for a man's honest convictions to provide a means of escape, so that he may possess those natural rights which belong to every inhabitant of earth to enjoy, including the liberty to breathe pure air without being taxed for it, especially in a case like mine, where the Collector refused to take the only kind of property I had been engaged in producing while a resident of Belchertown — my text-book on my improved method of shorthand. If nature qualifies a man to produce books, where is the justice in refusing them when offered, and then depriving him of his personal liberty?

He was freed when a friend paid the tax and accumulated fines ($5.62) "with the proviso that the town shall not sue him for board at the jail."

== Utopianism ==
While Smith was in jail he worked on a blueprint for a utopian reconstruction of society, along voluntaryist / mutualist lines, which he called "The Brotherhood of Man." This society would be led (or "served," as he puts it) by a class of its most spiritually advanced members, who would in turn be selected by "Soul-Readers" — people with a special clairvoyant talent for tapping into the supermundane. It would eventually span the globe.

This utopia also incorporated sex equality, eugenics (only the first class citizens should breed), the adoption of a universal language, pricing according to the labor theory of value, and communal ownership of property.

== Works ==
- The First Fonakigrafik Teacher (Google Books version)
- The First Stenographic Teacher
- The Stenografik Teecher
- The Kirografik Teecher
- Marriage and Divorce: or, The Trial and Defence of John Carl Cheney
- The Brotherhood of Man: being an address to the anti-tax league and toiling millions of Earth, proposing a new form of social organization for human society (Google Books version)

== See also ==
- "John Smith, Martyr". New York Times. 9 December 1879.
