= Church Street Historic District (Ware, Massachusetts) =

Historic district in Massachusetts, United States

- U.S. National Register of Historic Places
- U.S. Historic district
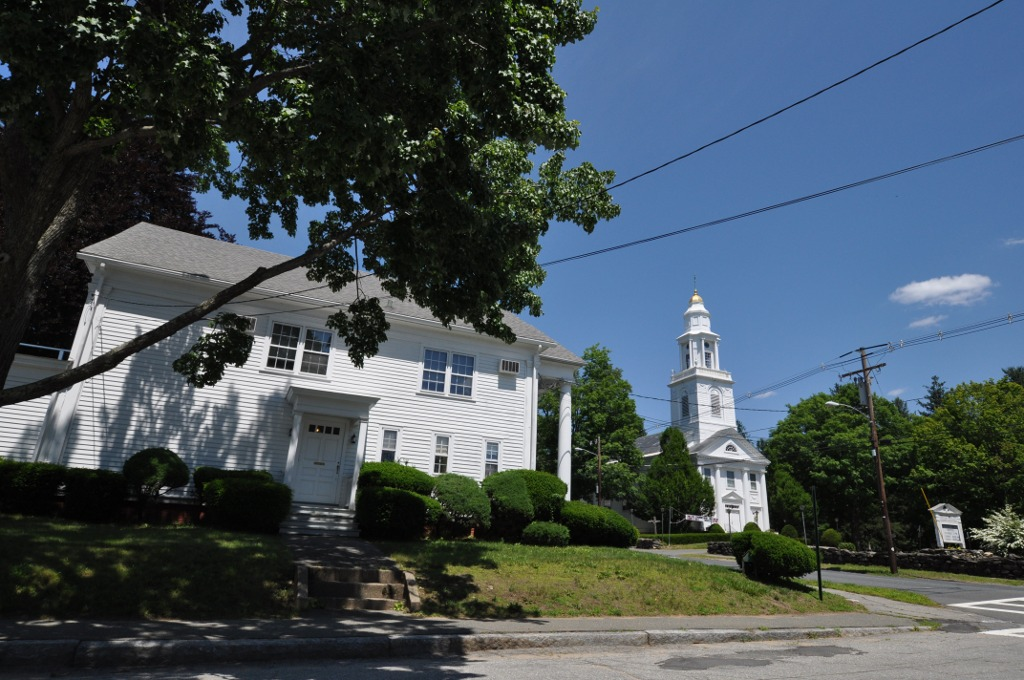

- Location within Massachusetts Location within the United States
- Location: Ware, Massachusetts
- Coordinates: 42°41′48″N 73°6′26″W
- Area: 160 acres (65 ha)
- Built: 1825
- Architect: Cummings, Marcus Fayette; Multiple
- Architectural style: Late 19th And 20th Century Revivals, Late Victorian
- NRHP reference No.: 86001246
- Added to NRHP: March 10, 1983

Church Street Historic District is a historic district roughly on Church Street between Park Ave. and Highland St. in Ware, Massachusetts. This mainly residential area includes some of Ware's finest late 19th century houses and a well-preserved collection of Greek Revival houses. The area was developed primarily in response to the growth of industry to the south. The district was listed on the National Register of Historic Places in 1983.

== Description and history ==
The town of Ware was established in the mid-18th century, with its town center several miles to the west. The falls of the Ware River (south of this district) were an early site of industrial activity, but did not experience significant growth until the 19th century. Large-scale development of the falls for textile production began in 1821, and including the platting of streets that make up what is now the town's commercial center. Church Street was a major road leading north from this area, and its southern end was developed with churches and single-family residences. As a result, the southern end of this district has a variety of housing which is mainly Greek Revival in character, that was built before about 1850.

The upper stretch of Church Street remained largely agricultural until the 1880s, with four farmhouses surviving from that time. Ware's economic prosperity in the late 19th century prompted the construction of an array of fine Queen Anne Victorian houses, many of which include particularly well-preserved carriage houses. A number of Colonial Revival houses were added as infill construction in the early 20th century. The old Ware High School building was built in 1893, and Grenville Park was laid out in 1907 based on the design principles of Frederick Law Olmsted. The park is, at 99 acres (40 ha), the largest component of the district, extend to and across the Ware River.

== See also ==
- National Register of Historic Places listings in Hampshire County, Massachusetts
- List of mill towns in Massachusetts
