= Heilbron House =

- U.S. National Register of Historic Places
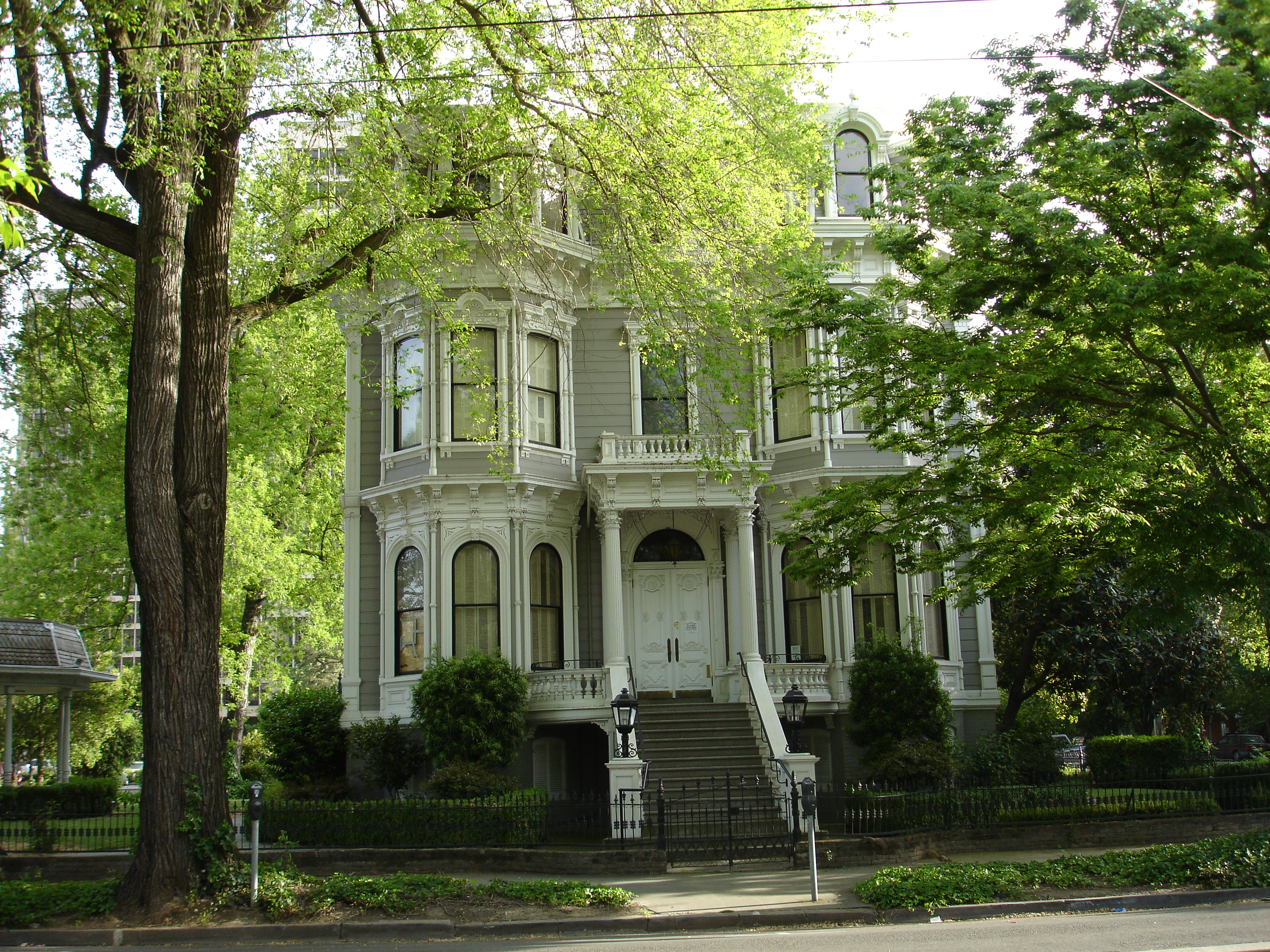
- Front view of home, from across the street

- Location within Sacramento, California Location within California Location within the United States
- Location: 704 O Street, Sacramento, California
- Coordinates: 38°34′32.2″N 121°29′58.8″W
- Area: 0.1 acres (0.040 ha)
- Built: 1881
- Architect: Nathaniel Goodell
- Architectural style: Italianate, High Victorian
- NRHP reference No.: 76000511
- Added to NRHP: December 12, 1976

The Heilbron House is a historic mansion in Downtown Sacramento, California. Built in 1881, it was initially the home of August Heilbron, a cattle rancher, merchant, and landowner who came from Germany.

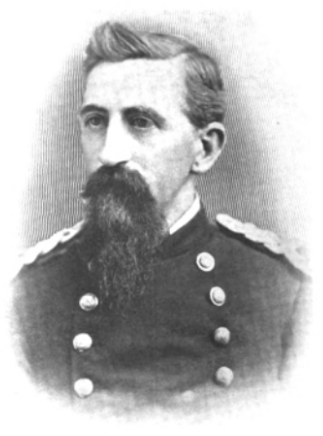
August Heilbron

The home is located just around the corner from Leland Stanford's iconic Stanford Mansion—marking the area as an upscale residential location for captains of industry. Heilbron hired Nathaniel Goodell, who also designed the home that later became the California Governor's Mansion. Costing $10,000 in all, the Heilbron House is one of the few remaining historic structures in an area that is now primarily populated with office buildings for the State of California.

In the last 65 years, the mansion has served as a restaurant, bank, and art gallery, and now serves as an office for the California Department of Parks and Recreation.

== See also ==
- History of Sacramento, California
