= Nathaniel Dwight =

Surveyor, militia captain, politician (1712–1784)

Nathaniel Dwight (June 20, 1712—March 30, 1784) was a surveyor, politician and militia captain in the Crown Point Expedition during the French and Indian War. He was among the founders of Cold Spring, now called Belchertown, Massachusetts in the US.

== Life ==
A member of the Dwight family, he was the youngest son of Nathaniel Dwight (1666-1711) and Mehetable Partridge (1675-1756) and born in Northampton. His grandnephew was Rev. Timothy Dwight V, eighth president of Harvard University

Nathaniel Dwight settled in what was then called Cold Spring (Belchertown) by July 1731 and served numerous terms in Town government. His older brother Timothy owned land there and surveyed the area with him as well, creating maps extant.

In 1755, he was given a captaincy and marched with a regiment from Deerfield on the Crown Point Expedition during the French and Indian War. The military mission was to take the French Fort Saint-Frédéric at Crown Point but it was aborted after the Battle of Lake George. Dwight wrote an account of the expedition that was published.

Nathaniel had vast landholdings and kept a tavern and inn at the Common into the 1770s. He served in various capacities in Town government including as selectman and represented as clerk at the Hampshire County Convention held September 1774 to discuss the "distressed state of the government," prior to the American Revolutionary War.

Nathaniel "signed a declaration of support for the ad hoc Massachusetts Bay government in their resistance efforts against Great Britain." He recorded, as Town clerk, the unanimous Town meeting vote to support the Continental Congress in declaring independence.

He was to be paid for 26 months service in 1775, during the first year of the War, including payments for a substitute for part of the time.

He married Hannah Mary Lyman (1708-1792) in Cold Spring on January 2, 1734. She was credited with bearing the first non-indigenous child in the Town and gave birth to nine children, seven of whom lived into adulthood: Elihu, Justus, Eunice, Jonathan, Susanna, Elijah and Pliny.

== Legacy ==
Known as "Captain" after the Crown Point Expedition, Nathaniel Dwight is considered a "scion of the so-called River Gods" of Colonial New England. His son Col. Elijah Dwight donated several acres of his father's land that today comprise the Town Common. His great-great-granddaughter donated the home that became the Stone House Museum in Belchertown.

Nathaniel and Hannah are buried in the South Cemetery in Belchertown. His epitaph reads:

"Come honest sexton with your spade,

And let my grave be quickly made; On Heaven’s decree I waiting lie, And all my wishes are to die.

Tho’ I must die and turn to dust, I hope to rise among the just. Jesus my body will refine,

I shall with him in glory shine
