= Long Mountain (Hampshire County, Massachusetts) =

Traprock mountain in Hampshire County, Massachusetts, U.S.

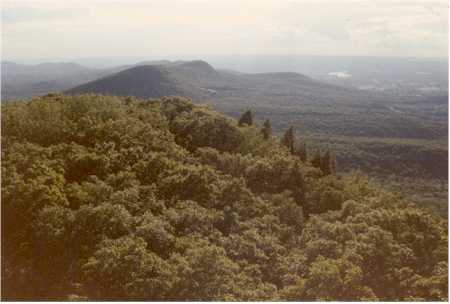
- Long Mountain from Mount Norwottuck

Highest point
- Elevation: 920 ft (280 m)
- Coordinates: 42°18′18″N 72°28′59″W

Geography
- Location: Amherst and Granby, Massachusetts.
- Parent range: Holyoke Range / Metacomet Ridge

Geology
- Rock age: 200 Ma
- Mountain type(s): Fault-block; igneous

Climbing
- Easiest route: Metacomet-Monadnock Trail

Long Mountain, 920 feet (280 m) feet above sea level, is a traprock mountain of the Holyoke Range, part of the greater Metacomet Ridge which stretches from Long Island Sound to nearly the Vermont border. The mountain rises steeply from the surrounding landscape 600 feet (180 m) below and consists of five distinct peaks, from east to west: 685 feet (209 m), 775 feet (236 m), 795 feet (242 m), 920 feet (280 m), the high point, and the eastern summit, 906 feet (276 m). It is located within the towns of Amherst and Granby, Massachusetts. The 110-mile (180 km) Metacomet-Monadnock Trail and the 47-mile (76 km) Robert Frost Trail traverse the mountain. The Holyoke Range continues to the west as Mount Norwottuck and to the east as Harris Mountain.

== Geology and ecology ==
Long Mountain, like much of the Metacomet Ridge, is composed of basalt, also called traprock, a volcanic rock. The mountain formed near the end of the Triassic Period with the rifting apart of the North American continent from Africa and Eurasia. Lava welled up from the rift and solidified into sheets of strata hundreds of feet thick. Subsequent faulting and earthquake activity tilted the strata, creating the steep ridge and talus slopes of Long Mountain. Hot, dry upper slopes, cool, moist ravines, and mineral-rich ledges of basalt talus produce a combination of microclimate ecosystems on the mountain that support plant and animal species uncommon in greater Massachusetts.

== Recreation ==
Several trails are located on Long Mountain, most notably the 110-mile (180 km) Metacomet-Monadnock Trail and the 47-mile (76 km) Robert Frost Trail which share the same footway on the mountain. Several ledges near the summit provide views of greater Amherst region and the Fort River valley. Most of Long Mountain has been conserved as part of the Mount Holyoke Range State Park; local conservations commissions and private land holders own the remaining acreage. The nearest trailhead to the summit is located on Harris Mountain Road precisely as it crosses the Granby to Amherst boundary line. This location can be accessed either via Bay Road in Amherst or Batchelor Street in Granby. The trail leading to the west leads to the summit.
