= Siberian lily =

Siberian lily is a common name for several plants and may refer to:

- Ixiolirion tataricum, with blue to purple flowers
- Lilium pensylvanicum, with orange flowers
