= Ware, Massachusetts =

- Town
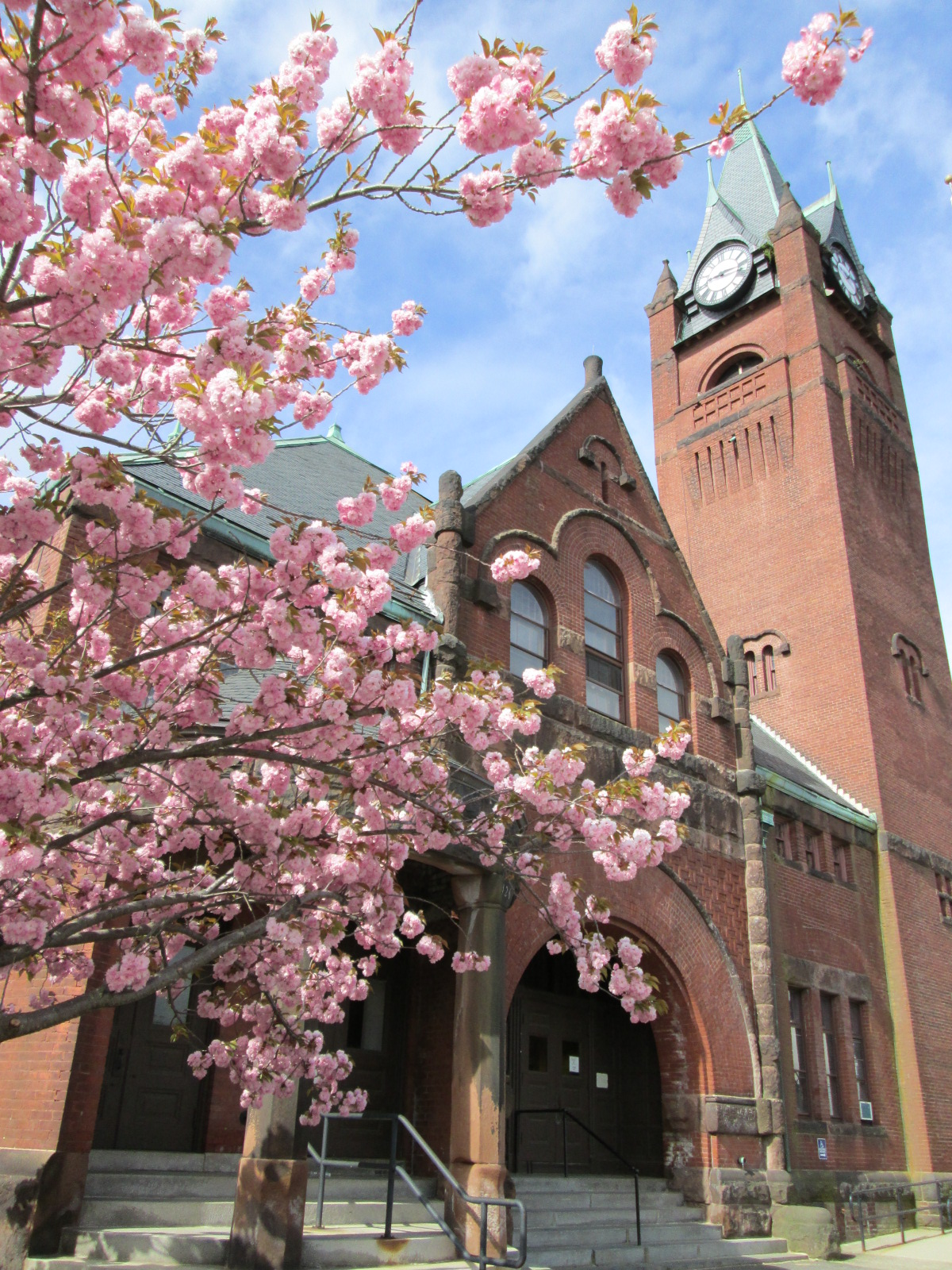
- Ware, MA, Town Hall

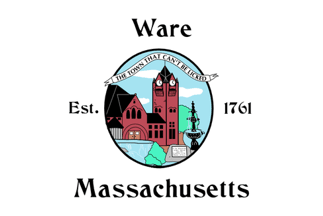
- Flag Seal
- Nickname: "The Town That Can't Be Licked" "A Place Worth Visiting"
- Location in Hampshire County in Massachusetts
- Coordinates: 42°15′35″N 72°14′25″W
- Country: United States
- State: Massachusetts
- County: Hampshire
- Settled: 1717
- Incorporated: 1775

Government
  - Type: Open Town Meeting

Area
  - Total: 40.0 sq mi (103.5 km^{2})
  - Land: 34.4 sq mi (89.0 km^{2})
  - Water: 5.6 sq mi (14.5 km^{2})
- Elevation: 476 ft (145 m)

Population (2020)
  - Total: 10,066
  - Density: 287/sq mi (110.9/km^{2})
- Time zone: UTC−5 (Eastern)
  - Summer (DST): UTC−4 (Eastern)
- ZIP Code: 01082
- Area code: 413
- FIPS code: 25-72880
- GNIS feature ID: 0618209
- Website: www.townofware.com

Ware is a town in Hampshire County, Massachusetts, United States. The population was 10,066 as of 2020. It is part of the Springfield, Massachusetts Metropolitan Statistical Area.

The census-designated place of Ware, comprising the main settlement of the town, is in the southeastern corner of the town. The area's students are served by Ware Junior Senior High School.

== History ==
Ware was first settled on Equivalent Lands in 1717 and was officially incorporated in 1775. Its name derives from the word "weir" and is thought to derive from the Nipmuc word "nenameseck" for the weirs the Nipmuc constructed for trapping fish on the Ware River. The English settlers pronounced the word "ware."

In 1716, a tract of land which was slightly more than 11,000 acres (4,500 ha) in size was granted to John Read. He named it "The Manor of Peace" and had it in mind to develop in the style of an English manor, anticipating that it would later become a very valuable country estate. He leased out the land and did not sell 1-acre (4,000 m^{2}) until after his death, when he bequeathed a gift of 200 acres (0.81 km^{2}) to serve as a ministry lot. As time passed, the town of Ware grew up around the old Congregational meeting house and later became a small center of local manufacturing and commerce.

In 1729, the first grist and sawmills were built on the banks of the Weir River by Jabez Olmstead, eventually becoming part of the Ware Millyard Historic District. During the American Revolution, there were at least eight taverns and several inns in the area. Two of the most famous were Ebenezer Nye's tavern and John Downing's. After town meetings were held, they would often adjourn to the latter establishment. By the 1830s, it was not uncommon to see textile mills dotted along the various local rivers. At this point, the Ware community was making the transition from an agrarian economy to an industrially based society. The post Civil War era (1860s–1900s) brought a new prosperity to the now established textile mill town. "Ware factory village", as it was known, sprang up overnight and formed the basis for new growth and development.

For nearly 100 years, the Otis company had been the largest single Ware employer. Cotton had been the primary raw material, and by 1937 denims, awnings and tickings were the principal output. It had been very prosperous until World War I, when its employees numbered close to 2,500. By the 1920s, however, the company began to decline due to lack of modern machinery and movement of industry to the south.

In 1922, it was affected by the New England Textile Strike, shutting down the mills in the town over an attempted wage cut.

By the mid-thirties, the directors decided to liquidate, although no public announcement was made. Shortly thereafter, the company sold its interests to three "cotton men"—Lawrence W. Robert Jr., Edward J. Heitzeberg, and Paul A. Redmond—all with close connections to Alabama Mills, which owned factories in the South.

Instantly, the townspeople rallied to the cause. A public mass meeting was called that evening and plans to raise the necessary cash in order to forestall what appeared to be the imminent ruin of the town were formulated. The citizens of Ware were able to purchase the mills with the backing of the Ware Trust Company. The mills became Ware Industries Inc., and Ware came to be known nationwide as "The Town That Can't Be Licked".

The town gained lands in the late 1930s as part of the construction of the Quabbin Reservoir. The reservoir dammed the Swift River in the former town of Enfield, flooding the valley. Four towns—Enfield, Greenwich, Prescott and Dana—were disincorporated in 1938 by this building of the reservoir. Much of Enfield and Greenwich became part of the town of Ware, extending the town's lands northward. Today, the town is home to most of the Winsor Dam and its spillway, and the Goodnough Dike, both of which lie within the Quabbin Reservation. Ware's portion of this land is some of the most accessible land in the reservation, with a large lookout tower atop Quabbin Hill. Ware also bears the morbid distinction of being host to the Quabbin Park Cemetery, where most of the graves in the former towns were relocated to, as well as most of the town monuments.

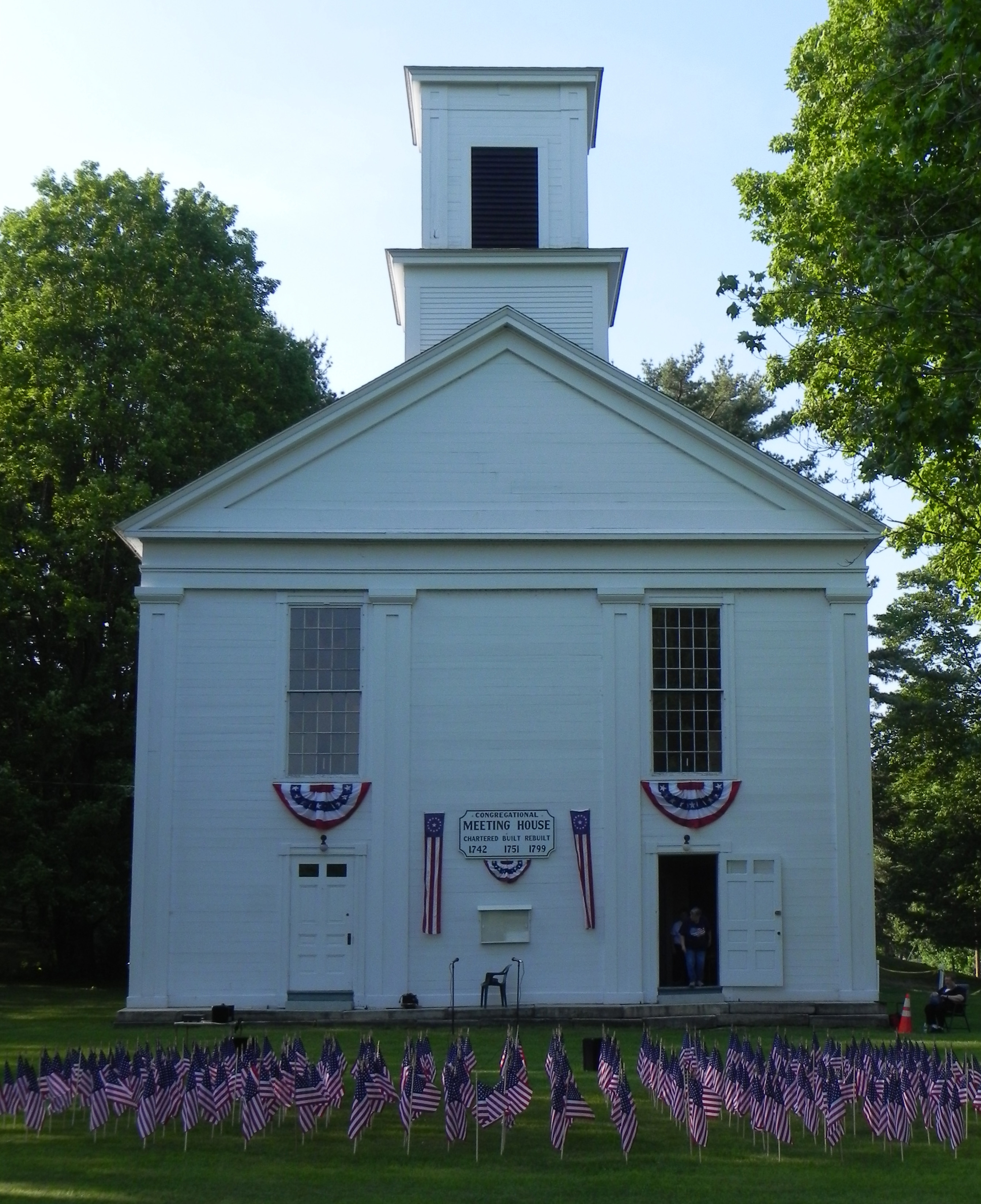

=== Historic districts ===
- Ware Center Historic District
- Church Street Historic District
- Ware Millyard Historic District

== Geography and transportation ==
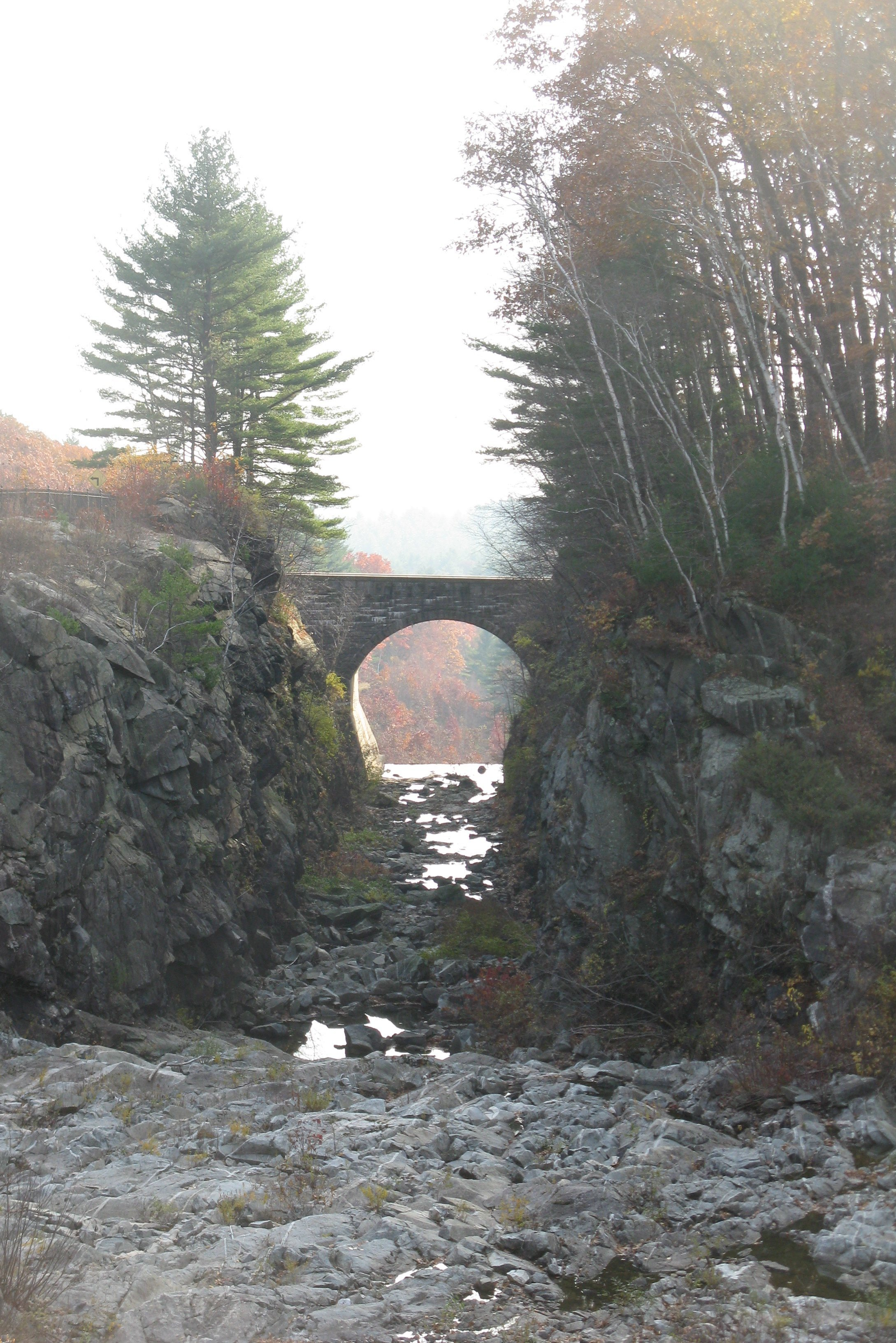
Winsor Dam bridge and spillway

According to the United States Census Bureau, the town has a total area of 40.0 square miles (103.5 km^{2}), of which 34.4 square miles (89.0 km^{2}) are land and 5.6 square miles (14.5 km^{2}), or 14.01%, are water. Ware lies at the southern end of the Quabbin Reservoir and the Quabbin Reservation. The reservation lands within town include two islands, the former Little Quabbin Hill and Mount Lizzie, neither of which were covered by the waters of the reservoir. The Swift River forms the western boundary of the town, and the Ware River flows through the southeastern part of the town, meeting in Palmer to form the Chicopee River (along with the Quaboag River), which flows into the Connecticut River. The lands of Ware are hilly between the valleys of the Swift and Ware rivers, and much of the land not surrounding the central part of town is heavily forested, with marshes lining the Ware River in spots. Along the Swift River lies the Herman Covey–Swift River Wildlife Management Area.

Ware is the easternmost town in Hampshire County and is bordered by Franklin County to the north, Worcester County to the east, and Hampden County to the south. The town is bordered by New Salem to the northwest, Petersham to the north, Hardwick to the northeast, New Braintree and West Brookfield to the east, a small portion of Warren to the southeast, Palmer to the south, and Belchertown to the west. (There is no land link between New Salem or Petersham and Ware due to the Quabbin Reservoir.) Downtown Ware lies 24 miles (39 km) east-southeast of the county seat of Northampton, 26 miles (42 km) northeast of Springfield, 30 miles (48 km) west of Worcester, and 72 miles (116 km) west of Boston.

Ware has no interstates or limited-access highways, the town center being 8.5 miles (13.7 km) north of Exit 63 (the Palmer exit) of Interstate 90. The town is linked to Route 9, the major east-west route through central Massachusetts, by Route 32, which runs concurrently with Route 9 from their merging point to just west of the West Brookfield town line, where Route 32 crosses through the eastern edge of Ware as it heads north. Route 9 heads west through town, passing along the edge of the Quabbin Reservation on its way towards Belchertown.

The town is served by the Pioneer Valley Transit Authority (PVTA)'s Ware Shuttle, which operates seven days a week and connects the Church Street Senior Center and Valley View to Ware Center, Ware Walmart, Palmer Center, Palmer Big Y, and Wilbraham Big Y; in Wilbraham, riders can transfer to other PVTA routes into Springfield. The town is also served by a commercial rail line, the Massachusetts Central Railroad, which follows the former Ware River Railroad line along the Ware River from Barre to where the line meets the Boston and Albany Railroad lines in Palmer. There is a private general aviation airstrip along Route 32 in the eastern part of town. The nearest national air service airports are Bradley International Airport in Connecticut and Worcester Regional Airport in Massachusetts.

Ware has multiple open sections of the Mass Central Rail Trail, a partially completed shared-use rail trail extending across Massachusetts between Northampton and Boston.

== Demographics ==
Historical population
Year	Pop.	±%
1790	773	—
1850	3,785	+389.7%
1860	3,597	−5.0%
1870	4,259	+18.4%
1880	4,817	+13.1%
1890	7,329	+52.1%
1900	8,263	+12.7%
1910	8,774	+6.2%
1920	8,525	−2.8%
1930	7,385	−13.4%
1940	7,557	+2.3%
1950	7,517	−0.5%
1960	7,517	+0.0%
1970	8,187	+8.9%
1980	8,953	+9.4%
1990	9,808	+9.5%
2000	9,707	−1.0%
2010	9,872	+1.7%
2020	10,066	+2.0%
2022	10,385	+3.2%

As of the census of 2000, there were 9,707 people, 4,027 households, and 2,597 families residing in the town. The population density was 282.1 inhabitants per square mile (108.9/km^{2}). There were 4,336 housing units at an average density of 126.0 per square mile (48.6/km^{2}). The racial makeup of the town was 96.49% White, 0.55% Black or African American, 0.23% Native American, 0.60% Asian, 0.06% Pacific Islander, 0.76% from other races, and 1.32% from two or more races. Hispanic or Latino of any race were 2.08% of the population.

There were 4,027 households, out of which 29.8% had children under the age of 18 living with them, 46.8% were married couples living together, 12.3% had a female householder with no husband present, and 35.5% were non-families. 29.1% of all households were made up of individuals, and 12.5% had someone living alone who was 65 years of age or older. The average household size was 2.41 and the average family size was 2.96.

In the town, the population was spread out, with 24.7% under the age of 18, 8.1% from 18 to 24, 29.3% from 25 to 44, 22.8% from 45 to 64, and 15.1% who were 65 years of age or older. The median age was 38 years. For every 100 females, there were 94.9 males. For every 100 females aged 18 and over, there were 91.6 males.

The median income for a household in the town was $36,875, and the median income for a family was $45,505. Males had a median income of $37,462 versus $25,733 for females. The per capita income for the town was $18,908. About 8.4% of families and 11.2% of the population were below the poverty line, including 16.8% of those under age 18 and 6.9% of those age 65 or over.

== Notable people ==
- Braddish Billings, Ottawa farmer and sponsored the construction of Billings Bridge
- Tracy Brown-May, member of the Nevada Assembly
- Philip D. Cloutier, engineer, attorney, and politician who served as a member of the Delaware House of Representatives
- Samuel Colt, inventor of the repeating pistol
- Dick Curless, country singer
- Shamus Culhane, animator, director, studio head at Walt Disney Studios
- Candy Cummings, major league baseball player in the 1870s, invented the curveball
- David Ferguson, impresario, activist, and iconoclast
- Gerry Foley, ice hockey player
- James H. Foster, politician, member of the Wisconsin State Assembly and the Wisconsin State Senate
- Joe Giard, pitcher for 1927 New York Yankees
- Philip F. Gura, professor, University of North Carolina at Chapel Hill
- Leslie Nelson Jennings, poet and editor
- Bertha Knight Landes, mayor of Seattle, Washington from 1926 to 1928 and first female mayor of a major American city
- Karen S. Lynch, president and CEO of CVS Health, the world's seventh largest company
- Jennifer Lafleur, actress who starred in Nope
- George Dana Boardman Pepper, ninth president of Colby College
- Ruth Baker Pratt, first congresswoman to be elected from New York
- Billy Jo Robidoux, major league baseball player
- Don Rondo, singer
- Roland D. Sawyer, clergyman, Christian socialist, state legislator, and author
- Pat Shea, was a Major League Baseball pitcher who played with the Philadelphia Athletics and the New York Giants
- Dana White, president of the Ultimate Fighting Championship

== See also ==
- List of mill towns in Massachusetts
