= Ellen Goodell Smith =

American physician

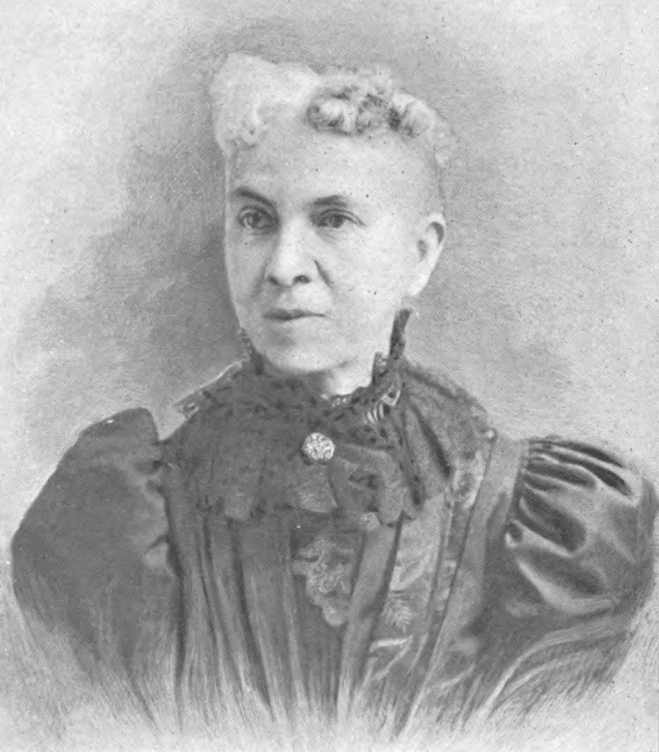
- Born: August 25, 1835; Belchertown, Massachusetts
- Died: November 3, 1906 (aged 71)
- Occupations: Physician, writer

Ellen Goodell Smith (August 25, 1835 – November 3, 1906) was an American hydropathic physician, vegetarian and writer.

== Biography ==
Smith was born at Dwight in Belchertown, Massachusetts. In 1857, Smith attended William T. Vail's Granite State Health Institute (a hydropathic institute) in Hill, New Hampshire, where she became a student and teacher. In 1859, she attended Russell T. Trall's New York Hygeio-Therapeutic College in New York City. She obtained her M.D. in 1861 with the highest honours. She worked as a physician at Dr. Vail's sanitarium until 1862. She became resident physician at Russell T. Trall's sanitarium in Philadelphia in 1864 and for two years managed the Victorian Turkish baths.

She married Dr. John Brown Smith of Northfield, Minnesota in 1867. A year later, Smith and her husband established the first hydropathic sanitarium and Turkish bath in Saint Paul, Minnesota. In the 1870s, she worked as resident physician at Trall's sanitarium. Her son, Lindsey Goodell Smith was born on August 25, 1874. Smith retired in 1883.

She authored the natural hygiene book, The Art of Living in 1903. It was dedicated to Edward H. Dewey, pioneer of the "No Breakfast Plan". Smith died from a fall in 1906.

== Vegetarianism ==
Smith authored the vegetarian book, The Fat of the Land and How to Live on It in 1896. It has been cited as an early vegan cookbook, as it contained a chapter "Milk and the Cow" which recommended not using dairy products. She omitted butter, cream, milk, salt and sugar from her recipes. It was the first published book to contain a recipe for a peanut butter sandwich.

== Selected publications ==
- A Practical Cook and Text Book for General Use: Fat of the Land and How to Live on It (1896)
- The Art of Living (1903)
- Recollections of a Pioneer Health Reformer (1905)
