= Lucy Doolittle Thomson =

American architect, historian, writer (1868–1943)

Lucy Doolittle Thomson (July 13, 1868 – September 20, 1943) was an American writer, historian and architect. She was among the first females to graduate from a four-year architectural school in the U.S.

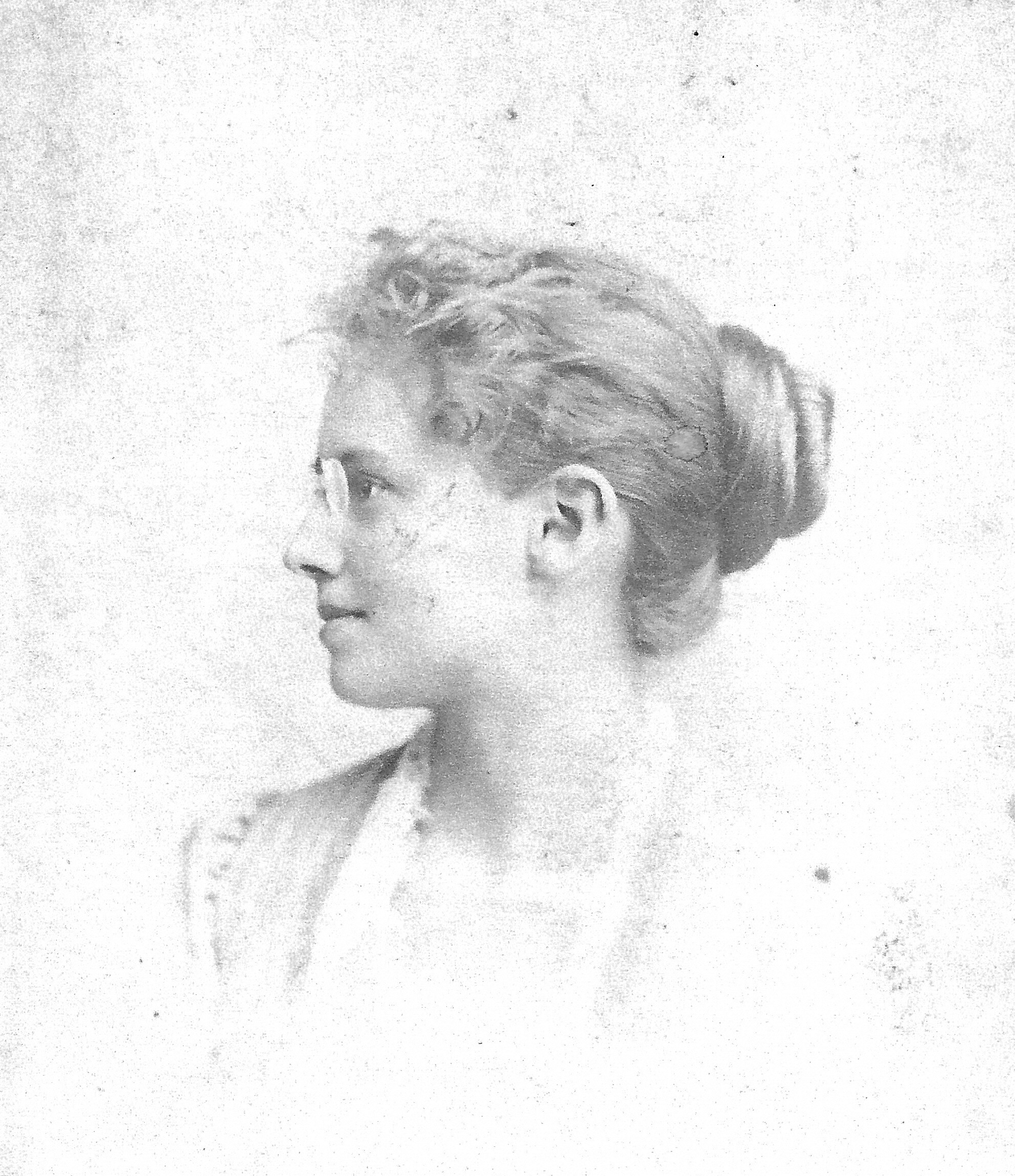
Lucy Doolittle Thomson. Courtesy Belchertown Historical Association.

Ms. Thomson received a BA in humanities from Smith College in 1890 and a BS in architecture from the Massachusetts Institute of Technology in 1896.

Women in the field of architecture were rare at the time. According to a list of early American female architects, she was the 12th woman to receive a degree in architecture in the U.S. and the seventh to graduate the M.I.T. program.

== Birth and family ==
Lucy Doolittle Thomson was born July 13, 1868, in Belchertown, Massachusetts, into a family of notable physicians, the daughter of Dr. George Francis Thomson (1833–1909) and Sophie Martha Brown (1838–1924), of Hadley, Massachusetts.

Her paternal great-grandfather and grandfather were physicians; the later was Dr. Horatio Thomson (1803–1860), a 1827 graduate of the medical school at Yale College, who directly afterwards moved to Belchertown. He erected a home in the Greek Revival style at 22 South Main Street where he practiced medicine. He died there in 1860 after which The New York Times published an obituary.

Lucy Doolittle Thomson was likely named for her grandfather's second wife, Lucy Maria Doolittle (1810–1869), daughter of Mark C. Doolittle (1781–1855), a prominent Belchertown attorney, author and historian. She raised Lucy D. Thomson's father George after his mother's death when he was an infant.

George taught school in Monson and Brimfield before attending the University of New York where he earned a medical degree in 1855. He was appointed for three years as a ship's doctor on the emigrant packet New World, which sailed between New York and Liverpool.

During the Civil War, Lucy's father George served as surgeon for the 38th and 11th Massachusetts infantry regiments before practicing medicine in Belchertown. He married Ms. Brown in 1865. At one time, he served patients in as many as 17 towns across Western Massachusetts. He died in Belchertown in the house in which he was born that his father had built.

== Career ==
Lucy Doolittle Thomson referred to herself as an architectural drafter. In one spring in the 1890s, her designs "included an ark for a synagogue, a golf club and caddy house, a garage for a jail, a parish house, a boys’ club, Colonial and Italian ironwork, a photostat room, not to mention the houses we always have with us.”

She practiced in Springfield, Boston, Providence, New York and Pittsfield, Massachusetts, where she moved in 1911 to work for the architectural firm Harding & Seaver.

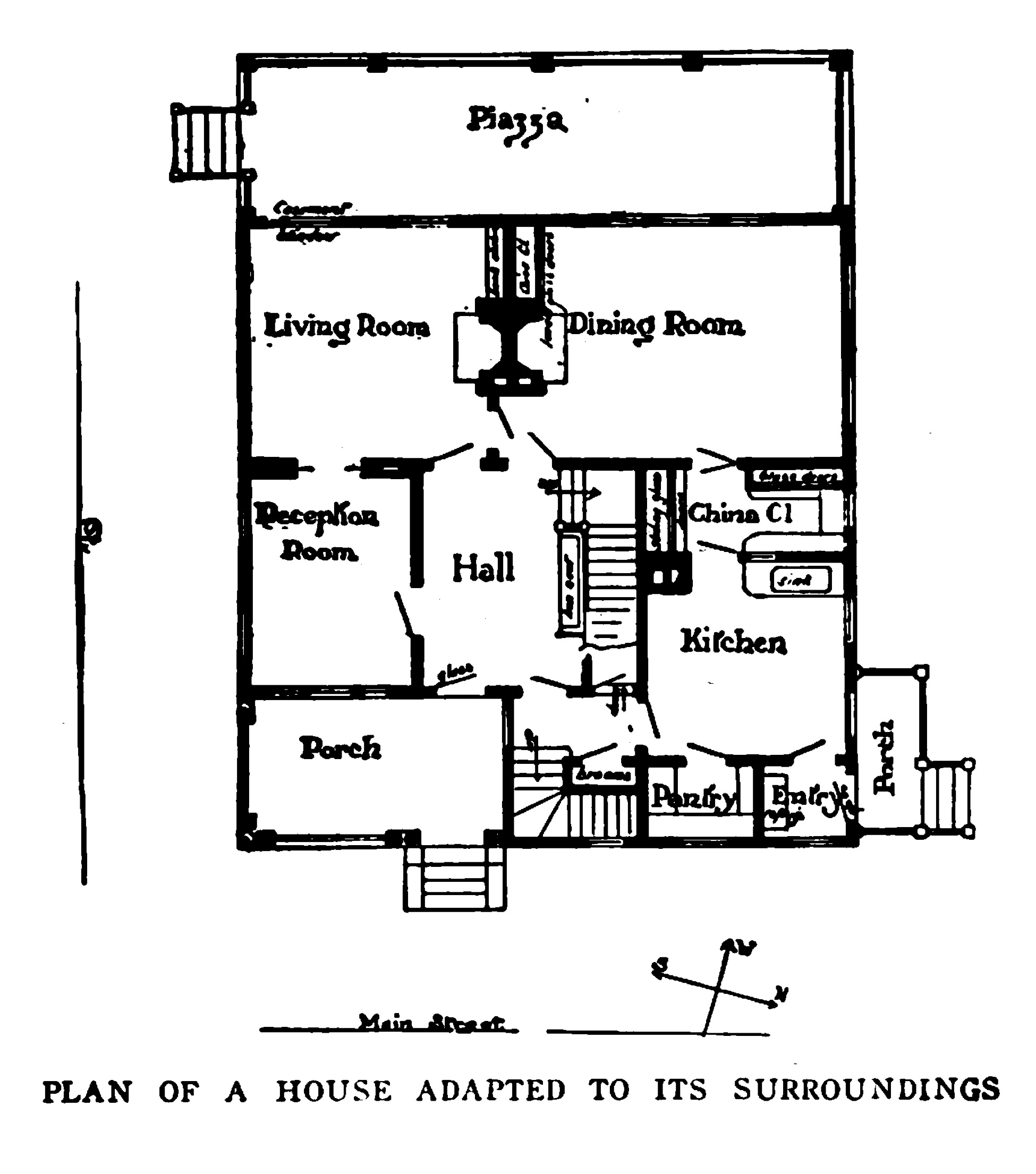
Lucy D. Thomson, published this drawing with the article she penned, "To Adapt a House to Its Site," published in the March 1901 issue of Good Housekeeping.

Thomson wrote extensively. She authored articles on history and architecture, both domestic and sacred, including poking fun at the Bungalow movement.

She wrote and illustrated the humor piece, "The Daftsman House: A Recipe," under a pseudonym, published in the May 15, 1911 issue of Country Life in America.

She published poems and short stories. The Springfield Daily Republican newspaper published her articles.

Her poem, "There is No Frigate Like A Book," first published in The Republican, was reprinted in The New York Times in 1898.

She began the Arts and Crafts Society in Town and was a noted expert in rug-making, using Native American designs and developing a rug-hooking industry called Subbekashe that employed local women.

She and her father Dr. George F. Thomson were among the founders of the Belchertown Historical Association when they held an initial meeting in the living room of their home and medical practice on South Main Street in 1903. The Association's collections were housed at the Clapp Memorial Library until 1922, when Ms. Thomson helped acquire, renovate and design the Stone House Museum.

She designed the Museum's Henry Ford Annex, which opened on the grounds in March 1924. The automobile magnate donated funds for its construction after visiting Belchertown in 1923 when he noted the need to preserve its carriages, wagons and sleighs, products of the Town's once-renowned and thriving carriage industry.

The Stone House Museum also possesses a collection of Ms. Thomson's papers and drawings.

== Death ==
She died at age 75, in Northampton, Massachusetts, on September 20, 1943, and was buried in the Mount Hope Cemetery in Belchertown.
