= Belchertown, Massachusetts =

Settlement in U.S. state of Massachusetts

- Town
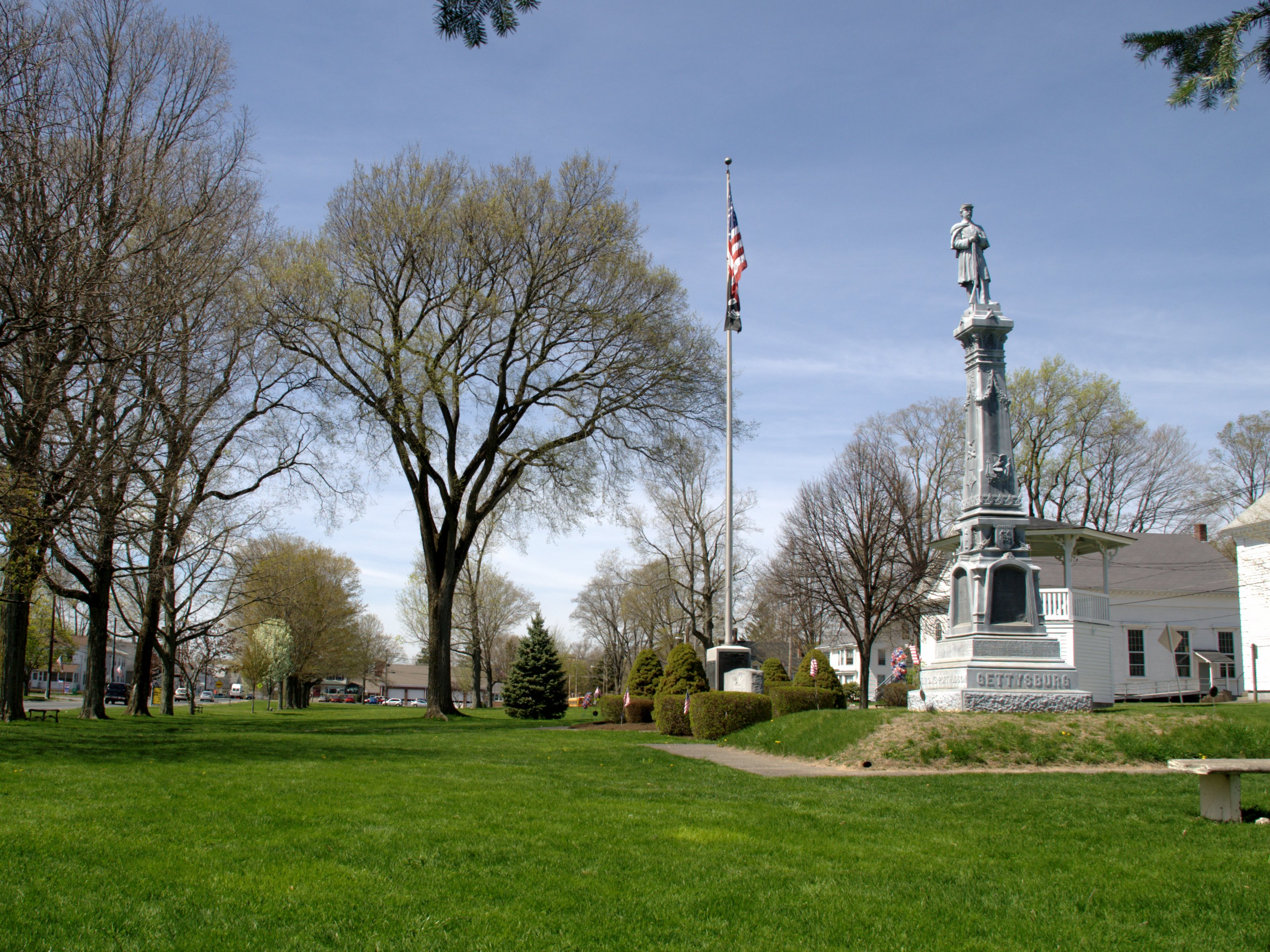
- Belchertown Common

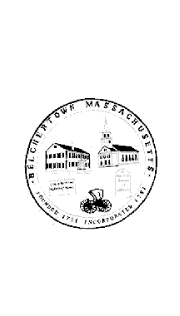
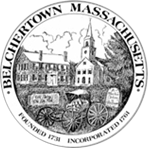
- Flag Seal
- Nicknames: B-town, Cold Spring
- Location in Hampshire County in Massachusetts
- Coordinates: 42°16′37″N 72°24′05″W
- Country: United States
- State: Massachusetts
- County: Hampshire
- Settled: 1731
- Incorporated: 1761

Government
  - Type: Open town meeting
  - Select Board: Whitney Jorns Kuhnlenz, Chair; Nicole Miner, Vice Chair; Jonathan Ritter, Clerk; Jennifer D. Turner, Member; Lesa Lessard Pearson, Member
  - Town Manager: Steve Williams

Area
  - Total: 55.4 sq mi (143.4 km^{2})
  - Land: 52.7 sq mi (136.6 km^{2})
  - Water: 2.6 sq mi (6.8 km^{2})
- Elevation: 614 ft (187 m)

Population (2020)
  - Total: 15,350
  - Density: 291/sq mi (112.4/km^{2})
- Time zone: UTC−5 (Eastern)
  - Summer (DST): UTC−4 (Eastern)
- ZIP Code: 01007
- Area code: 413
- FIPS code: 25-04825
- GNIS feature ID: 0618196
- Website: www.belchertown.org

Belchertown (previously known as Cold Spring and Belcher's Town) is a town in Hampshire County, Massachusetts, United States. It is part of the Springfield, Massachusetts Metropolitan Statistical Area. The population was 15,350 at the 2020 census.

The town includes the census-designated place of Belchertown. Belchertown was formerly the home of the Belchertown State School. The land on which the school sat is, as of 2016, being redeveloped for mixed uses including residential, commercial and recreational. This includes the 385-acre (156 ha) Lampson Brook Farm, used for community and sustainable agriculture, outdoor recreation, and wildlife preservation.

== History ==
The area encompassing the Town is part of a crossroads of Native trails in the Connecticut River Valley of Western Massachusetts that indigenous people traveled including the Nipmuc and Norwottuck, or Nonotuck and Nolwotogg, among others. Artifacts found in the early 20th century just south of Dwight, near Lake Metacomet, suggest, "evidence of Native American occupations in Belchertown" that began some 7,000 years ago.

In 1658, land in present-day Belchertown (and other Towns) was negotiated between the Nonotuck Sachem named Chickwalloppe, other Sachems and John Pynchon, son of Springfield founder William Pynchon. In August 1662, land in present-day Belchertown (including South Hadley and Granby) was negotiated by Awonunsk, a Nonotuck, with her husband Wequagon and son Squomp, in a deed with Pynchon. "They reserved continued Native rights to freely hunt, fish, set up wigwams, harvest wood etc. on these lands."

Few interactions between people, both the indigenous and non-indigenous, were recorded within the modern-day boundaries though on July 29, 1704, Thomas Battis, of Brookfield, "coming to Hadley as a post, was killed in the present Belchertown," by Native Americans.

In 1716, the Equivalent Lands were sold by Connecticut Colony to residents who reside in present-day Connecticut and Massachusetts. Some of these lands were granted to Jonathan Belcher, the future Royal Governor of Massachusetts who served between 1730 and 1741.

The Equivalent Lands, from Hadley to Brookfield, became known as "Cold Spring township" before Amherst, Belchertown, Pelham, Prescott, Ware and parts of Enfield were incorporated as towns. There was "much buying and selling of the 'Equivalent Lands' at Cold Spring." In 1722, twelve men bought about 8,400 acres at Cold Spring, seven of the buyers were Northampton farmers. They paid "3 shillings per acre, in bills, or at about 25 cents in real value."

Five years later, in 1727,

Connecticut sold its rights to the territory, now Belchertown, to seven persons residing in or near Boston, in six equal divisions, the fifth to Jonathan Belcher. During October and November 1727, Col. Timothy Dwight of Northampton surveyed and plotted the territory. His lines included 27,390 acres.

That same year, the area was said to be settled by non-indigenous people, with several families recorded there by July 1731, and was known variously as "Cold Spring," "Cold Spring plantation" and "Cold Spring township." It was named for "a large fountain" that indigenous people used before it became a popular watering hole for non-indigenous travelers on the Hadley Trail section of the Old Bay Path.

For a number of years, there was no house between Hadley and Brookfield and a traveler, from Hatfield, named "Cowles" was said to have discovered the spring, and it was named "Cowles Spring," according to an early 20th century newspaper article (without primary sourcing). The earliest mention of "Cold Spring" found to date is denoted on a map accompanying a deed to Benjamin Stebbins dated 1719.

The actual spring "afforded a convenient place for refreshment to the traveler in his solitary journey through the wilderness," according to a history. "As the communication between the towns upon the river and the eastern section of the State grew more frequent the spring became a celebrated watering-place for travelers, and finally gave the first name to the township."

There were soon "twenty families with more expected soon." The first community church was organized in 1737 with the election of its first deacon, John Smith (1687–1777), who had arrived the previous year. Rev. Edward Billings was appointed the first minister in 1738, the year construction began on the Town's combined church and meeting house. Finances delayed its completion until 1746. Rev. Billings was dismissed by the Town in April 1752 for opposition to the half-way covenant. Rev. Justus Forward was the Town's second minister.

The first meeting for the Cold Spring precinct was held on April 28, 1740, and was authorized by the Massachusetts General Court to be called by Deacon Smith. This meeting was for police purposes, electing officers, and raising money to support the gospel and other prudential matters.

Over the following two decades, citizens sent several petitions to State officials to become incorporated. Finally, on June 23, 1761, the "plantation called Cold Spring" became "Belcher's Town," named after the then former governor of Massachusetts, merchant and landowner though he is said to have never "set foot" in the place. The name was later shortened to Belchertown.

The first town meeting was held September 30, 1761. It is interesting to note that two of the elected officials were a deer reeve and a hog reeve, the latter being required to round up stray hogs and care for them in the town pound. Deer reeves were expected to control the illegal killing of deer as these animals were then becoming scarce in this area. Early town meetings were also religious affairs. Laws were passed on attending and supporting the church and observing the Sabbath.

There are about 10 cemeteries in Belchertown. The South Cemetery, on Mill Valley Road south of the Common, was established 1742. A cemetery to the northwest, referred to Pond Hill Cemetery, now as Lake Vale Cemetery, was established in 1755 though some unmarked graves date to 1730. The Town purchased the cemetery, then two acres, in 1766.

The Town's historic villages include Dwight's Station (Dwight), Bardwell Village (also called Skeetersville and Tylerville), Barrett's Junction and Slab City.

The actual "Cold Spring" is still active and located in south-central Belchertown, on the north side of Cold Spring Road, to the west of Sabin Street on lands owned by the University of Massachusetts.

=== Old Bay Path ===
There was an extension from a 1673 road from Boston known as the Old Bay Path, that, at West Brookfield, ran west and was called the "Hadley Trail" or "Hadley Path" that dated to "soon after 1660." This ran through Ware, Belchertown, Hadley, Northampton, and eventually to points west toward Albany, New York. The Path roughly followed routes that were begun and used by Native Americans for centuries. Another road, known also as the Old Bay Path or Pynchon's Path, split off in West Brookfield and headed south towards Springfield.

The Hadley Trail, later simply called the Old Bay Path or the County Road, at one time entered southeastern Belchertown and traversed the Town to the northeast, exiting just south of the Pond Hill or Lakes region. From the Town of Ware, the Trail crossed the Swift River and roughly followed today's Cold Spring Road to today's Mill Valley Road (Route 181) by the South Cemetery, and up through the Common and out Federal Street (Route 9), into South Amherst and Hadley. It was purported for a time to run north on Sabin Street then west across Cordner Street or west across Aldrich Street to meet Mill Valley Road.

Part of the colonial post road system for mail delivery, three extant markers were placed in Belchertown by 1765, according to one researcher.

The Path was romanticized by a 19th century writer. "It was marked by trees a portion of the distance and by slight clearings of brush and thicket for the remainder," wrote J. G. Holland, the author born at Dwight (North Belchertown), in his first novel, which was about life along the Path. "No stream was bridged, no hill was graded, and no marsh drained. The path led through woods which bore the marks of the centuries, over barren hills that had been licked by the Indian's hounds of fire, and along the banks of streams that the seine had never dragged. . . ."

"A powerful interest was attached to the Bay Path. It was the channel through which laws were communicated, through which flowed news from distant friends, and through which came long, loving letters and messages. . . . That rough thread of soil, chopped by the blades of a hundred streams, was a bond that radiated at each terminus into a thousand fibres of love and interest, and hope and memory. Every rod had been prayed over, by friends on the journey and friends at home."

Today's Bay Road follows the approximate route of the Hadley Trail for about 11 miles, from central Belchertown into west Hadley.

=== Non-indigenous settlers ===
Benjamin Stebbins, Sr. (1687-1769), of Northampton, is listed as a "nonresident proprietor," on a deed of 300 acres in Belchertown in 1719, with the "Cold Spring" in the southwest corner, according to a survey made by Timothy Dwight. He had married Mary Ashley in 1709 in Northampton. Some sources place the first date of settlement in July 1731, but 1727 is the year that the Stebbins are said to have built a homestead along today's Stebbins Street, just south of Bay Road, or the Pond Hill/Lakes region. The property was at the "southern foot of the eastern spur" of the Holyoke Range. According to the family genealogy, Stebbins received from Jonathan Belcher five hundred acres of land in 1727, "as an inducement … to settle [Belchertown]" and was "said to have been the first … to make a permanent residence" though it was likely his son Benjamin Stebbins, Jr. (1711–1789) who first settled here; he married Rebecca Day (1713-1769) on September 26, 1733. They both died and were buried in Belchertown.

An elder cousin settled nearby: Samuel Stebbins (1758-1732), a widower who had served variously as constable, treasurer and "Tythingman." He died on September 3, 1732, and was said to be among the first burials at Lake Vale Cemetery, overlooking Lake Metacomet. Samuel had been the subject of a scandalous divorce, worth mentioning here, involving several children fathered with a woman other than his wife in the late 17th century and crimes including "selling strong drink."

The homestead on Stebbins Street, a Dutch colonial gambrel built in 1768 by Gideon Stebbins, son of Benjamin and Rebecca, burned to the ground in 1966.

In 1728, Deacon Aaron Lyman (1705-1780) came from Northampton and was said to have been licensed to operate a tavern to the south of the Belchertown Common, near the Cold Spring, the naturally occurring spring for horses previously mentioned, which was frequented by indigenous peoples. Five years later, Lyman would marry Eunice Dwight (1710-1760), whose cousins, Timothy Dwight (1694-1771) and brother Nathaniel Dwight (1712-1784), both surveyors, were among the founders of the Town. Lyman's sister Hannah (1708-1792) married Nathaniel Dwight. Lyman was elected deacon in 1737.

Ebenezer Bridgman (1686-1769) and Mary Parsons (1680-1770) came from Northampton in 1732 to Pond Hill. Their great-grandson was Elijah Coleman Bridgman, first missionary to China, who was born in the Joseph Bridgman (1712-1773) home, a Dutch colonial gambrel dating ca. 1750-1770 (It remains at 393 Bay Road). Sam Bascom (1692-1765) and Mary's sister Experience Parsons (1692-1749) established a tavern and inn nearby, along the Bay Road, for travelers between Brookfield and Northampton—those "after candle-wood, or for the purpose of boxing pine trees for turpentine, for hunting purposes, or to attend the large herds grazing there."

John Smith (1687-1777), elected one of the first deacons at Belchertown, and Elizabeth Hovey (1686-1758) moved slightly west of the Bridgmans (84 Old Bay Road) about 1736 or before, as the home, still standing, is dated to 1728 by the Town. Smith was authorized by the Massachusetts General Court to call the first legislative meeting of Cold Spring (Belchertown) settlers. Clergyman Ethan Smith was born here, the grandson of John and Elizabeth. At about the same time, several other families, including the aforementioned Dwights, settled in the area or owned land near the Belchertown Common.

The Dwights were considered so-called "river gods," a term scholars use to describe "a network of interrelated gentry families connected by birth and marriage, earned a deified moniker during their mortal lives because they monopolized religion, defense, law, politics, and culture in Connecticut River Valley society." The other previously mentioned first families of Belchertown could be considered de facto members of this group.

Aaron Hannum, son of William Hannum (1690-1755) and Mary Hutchinson (1699-1785) who settled to Belchertown in 1732, and Rachel Smith, daughter of the aforementioned John Smith and Elizabeth Hovey, built a house at Pond Hill in about 1750 (90 Bay Road); his cousin Phineas Hannum and partner Mary Williams built one just south of the center of Dwight (715 Federal Street), in about 1770.

=== African Americans ===
By the 1790 census, there was one free Black household, and three other Black residents living in white households in Belchertown. The Black population in Belchertown was relatively small between 1790 and 1870 with 24 or less.

In February 2025, the Belchertown Memorial Committee approved adding the name of John Freeman on the Town Revolutionary War plaque on the Common. Freeman was an African American who served in the Revolutionary War and lived in Belchertown (near the Pond Hill region) as did generations of his descendants.

=== Belchertown State School ===
The Belchertown State School for mentally disabled residents was located in the town for over 70 years, from 1922 until its closing in 1994 amid revelations of poor conditions and inhumane treatment of its residents. The property has since been under consideration for redevelopment housing, business and agricultural use.

== Geography and transportation ==
In 1816, part of Belchertown was combined with part of the town of Greenwich, Massachusetts, to form Enfield, Massachusetts. In 1938, Enfield and Greenwich were two of the four towns that were disincorporated to make way for the Quabbin Reservoir, and the northwest part of Enfield was merged back into Belchertown.

According to the United States Census Bureau, the town has a total area of 55.4 square miles (143.4 km^{2}), of which 52.7 square miles (136.6 km^{2}) is land and 2.6 square miles (6.8 km^{2}) (4.77%) is water. Belchertown lies along the western banks of the western branch of the Quabbin Reservoir, with the lands around that water being part of the Quabbin Reservation. The town is hilly north of the town center, the hills forming part of the former Swift River Valley, with most of the rest of the town being relatively slowly sloping plains, spotted with plenty of meadow lands. Along the Swift River, which forms the eastern border of the town, lies the Herman Covey—Swift River Wildlife Management Area. Several other brooks and ponds dot the town's landscape, with some marshy lands lying along the Broad Brook.

Belchertown lies partially along the Franklin County line to the northeast, and along the Hampden County line to the south. It is bordered by Pelham to the north, New Salem to the northeast, Ware to the east, Palmer to the southeast, Ludlow to the southwest, and Granby and Amherst to the west. The town does not share a land border with New Salem, but borders the town's territory on the Quabbin Reservoir. The town's center lies 14 miles (23 km) east-southeast of the county seat of Northampton, 18 miles (29 km) northeast of Springfield, 37 miles (60 km) west of Worcester and 77 miles (124 km) west of Boston. Most of the population is centered around the town center, with most of the town being rural-residential, especially around the smaller ponds near the villages of Dwight and North Station.

The nearest interstate to the town, Interstate 90, runs just south of the town, with exits in Ludlow and Palmer. The exit in Ludlow can be reached along Route 21, which terminates at U.S. Route 202 west of the town common. (Prior to the building of the Quabbin Reservoir, Route 21 extended north along North Enfield Road towards the town of Athol.) The Palmer exit can be accessed along Route 181, which links U.S. Route 20 in Palmer and Route 202 in Belchertown, where the latter turns northwards towards Pelham along the edge of the reservoir. The town is also crossed by Route 9, the major east–west route through central Massachusetts, which heads from Ware towards Amherst, passing just north of the town center. Interstate 91 runs can be reached on Route 9 about nine miles from the Belchertown/Pelham line.

The New England Central Railroad and an abandoned line which once linked to the Massachusetts Central Railroad in Palmer pass through the town. The NECR carries freight on the line, though north of Belchertown it was a part of the Amtrak Vermonter service between Vermont and the rest of the northeast until being rerouted through Holyoke and Greenfield in 2014. There is a private airstrip, Metropolitan Airport, in Palmer, but the nearest national air service can be reached at Bradley International Airport in Connecticut.

=== Climate ===
Climate data for Belchertown, Massachusetts (1991–2020)
Month	Jan	Feb	Mar	Apr	May	Jun	Jul	Aug	Sep	Oct	Nov	Dec	Year
Mean daily maximum °F (°C)	33.0 (0.6)	35.4 (1.9)	43.7 (6.5)	56.5 (13.6)	68.3 (20.2)	76.7 (24.8)	81.8 (27.7)	80.1 (26.7)	72.8 (22.7)	60.4 (15.8)	48.6 (9.2)	38.3 (3.5)	58.0 (14.4)
Daily mean °F (°C)	24.2 (−4.3)	25.2 (−3.8)	33.7 (0.9)	45.2 (7.3)	56.5 (13.6)	65.5 (18.6)	70.8 (21.6)	69.0 (20.6)	62.1 (16.7)	50.0 (10.0)	39.6 (4.2)	29.9 (−1.2)	47.6 (8.7)
Mean daily minimum °F (°C)	15.4 (−9.2)	15.1 (−9.4)	23.7 (−4.6)	33.8 (1.0)	44.8 (7.1)	54.3 (12.4)	59.8 (15.4)	58.0 (14.4)	51.5 (10.8)	39.7 (4.3)	30.5 (−0.8)	21.5 (−5.8)	37.3 (3.0)
Average precipitation inches (mm)	3.46 (88)	3.09 (78)	3.71 (94)	3.68 (93)	3.57 (91)	4.21 (107)	4.21 (107)	4.78 (121)	4.53 (115)	4.78 (121)	3.48 (88)	4.01 (102)	47.51 (1,205)
Average snowfall inches (cm)	12.3 (31)	13.7 (35)	8.8 (22)	1.4 (3.6)	0.0 (0.0)	0.0 (0.0)	0.0 (0.0)	0.0 (0.0)	0.0 (0.0)	0.2 (0.51)	1.5 (3.8)	9.6 (24)	47.5 (119.91)
Source: NOAA

== Demographics ==
Historical population
Year	Pop.	±%
1790	1,485	—
1850	2,680	+80.5%
1860	2,709	+1.1%
1870	2,428	−10.4%
1880	2,346	−3.4%
1890	2,120	−9.6%
1900	2,292	+8.1%
1910	2,054	−10.4%
1920	2,058	+0.2%
1930	3,139	+52.5%
1940	3,503	+11.6%
1950	4,487	+28.1%
1960	5,186	+15.6%
1970	5,936	+14.5%
1980	8,339	+40.5%
1990	10,579	+26.9%
2000	12,968	+22.6%
2010	14,649	+13.0%
2020	15,350	+4.8%
2022*	15,316	−0.2%
* = population estimate. Source: United States census records and Population Estimates Program data.

As of the census of 2000, there were 12,968 people, 4,886 households, and 3,517 families residing in the town. The population density was 245.9 inhabitants per square mile (94.9/km^{2}). There were 5,050 housing units at an average density of 95.8 per square mile (37.0/km^{2}). The racial makeup of the town was 96.14% White, 0.81% Black or African American, 0.19% Native American, 0.96% Asian, 0.05% Pacific Islander, 0.55% from other races, and 1.30% from two or more races. Hispanic or Latino of any race was 1.57% of the population.

There were 4,886 households, out of which 38.8% had children under the age of 18 living with them, 59.2% were married couples living together, 9.8% had a female householder with no husband present, and 28.0% were non-families. Of all households 20.3% were made up of individuals, and 7.0% had someone living alone who was 65 years of age or older. The average household size was 2.65 and the average family size was 3.09.

In the town, the population was spread out, with 27.3% under the age of 18, 7.1% from 18 to 24, 33.3% from 25 to 44, 23.6% from 45 to 64, and 8.8% who were 65 years of age or older. The median age was 36 years. For every 100 females, there were 94.9 males. For every 100 females age 18 and over, there were 91.9 males.

The median income for a household in the town was $52,467, and the median income for a family was $60,830. Males had a median income of $39,656 versus $30,909 for females. The per capita income for the town was $21,938. About 5.1% of families and 5.9% of the population were below the poverty line, including 6.1% of those under age 18 and 4.4% of that age 65 or over.

== Government ==
Belchertown's executive authority consists of a select board, which in 1964 expanded from three members to five. In 2019, the name was changed from Board of Selectmen to Belchertown Select Board. There are 22 departments, including community TV, which operates channels 191, 192, and 193 on the cable television system in Belchertown. There are 25 boards, commissions, committees and authorities.

== Education ==
Today, the Belchertown School District:

- Swift River Elementary School (K–2)
- Chestnut Hill Community School (3–5)
- Jabish Middle School (6–8)
- Belchertown High School (9–12)

=== History ===
The first money for a school was made available at a precinct meeting, held November 18, 1756, according to the History of the Connecticut River Valley. Nathaniel Dwight, treasurer, was by vote authorized to receive of Edward Pynchon, county treasurer, for the support of a school, the money 'granted out of Sheffield's fine.'" A committee report, dated 1767, recommended three schoolhouses for the Town including, "...one [schoolhouse] to be sat on the plain at the top of pine hill this side of Hannum's..." A committee to divide the Town into school districts met in 1773, but that didn't occur until after the American Revolution.

In 1784, the District System originated, with the establishment of eight small schools in different areas around Belchertown, which provided a basic education to children of all ages.

The private Belchertown Classical School opened in 1836 with 60 scholars the following year. After closure, its building on the Common became the Belcher House, then the Park Lane Inn. Today, a part of it is said to be incorporated into the structure occupied by McCarthy's Pub.

In 1878, Belchertown had eighteen public schools, including a grammar school and a high school, with a total of 27 teachers and 572 enrolled students. Eventually road improvements and greater community emphasis on education resulted in the consolidation of the district schools.

As district schools were phased out and closed in the early 20th century, most were sold to private individuals and converted to dwellings. The Union School, or Dwight School, was the last to close in Belchertown in 1953. Today it is incorporated into a private residence. Only one of Belchertown's schoolhouses, the Washington District School, once located at 103 Bardwell Street, was not converted to residential use. The School, constructed by builder Henry Hoag in 1882 on the site of an earlier schoolhouse, permanently closed in June of 1938 and was sold by the Town in 1941.

In 2016, it was acquired by the Belchertown Historical Association and moved to the Stone House Museum property, where it is undergoing a campaign for its restoration.

== Industry and business ==
The Town was once primarily agricultural and was at one time considered the "Detroit of the carriage industry," manufacturing parts for, assembling, painting and exporting hundreds of coaches, wagons, sleighs and barouches, to name a few, every year in the 19th century.

Today, Belchertown is home to some restaurants, banks, boutique shops and many small businesses.

The University of Massachusetts-Amherst, in neighboring Amherst, has historically employed more Belchertown residents than any other enterprise or institution.

== Points of interest ==
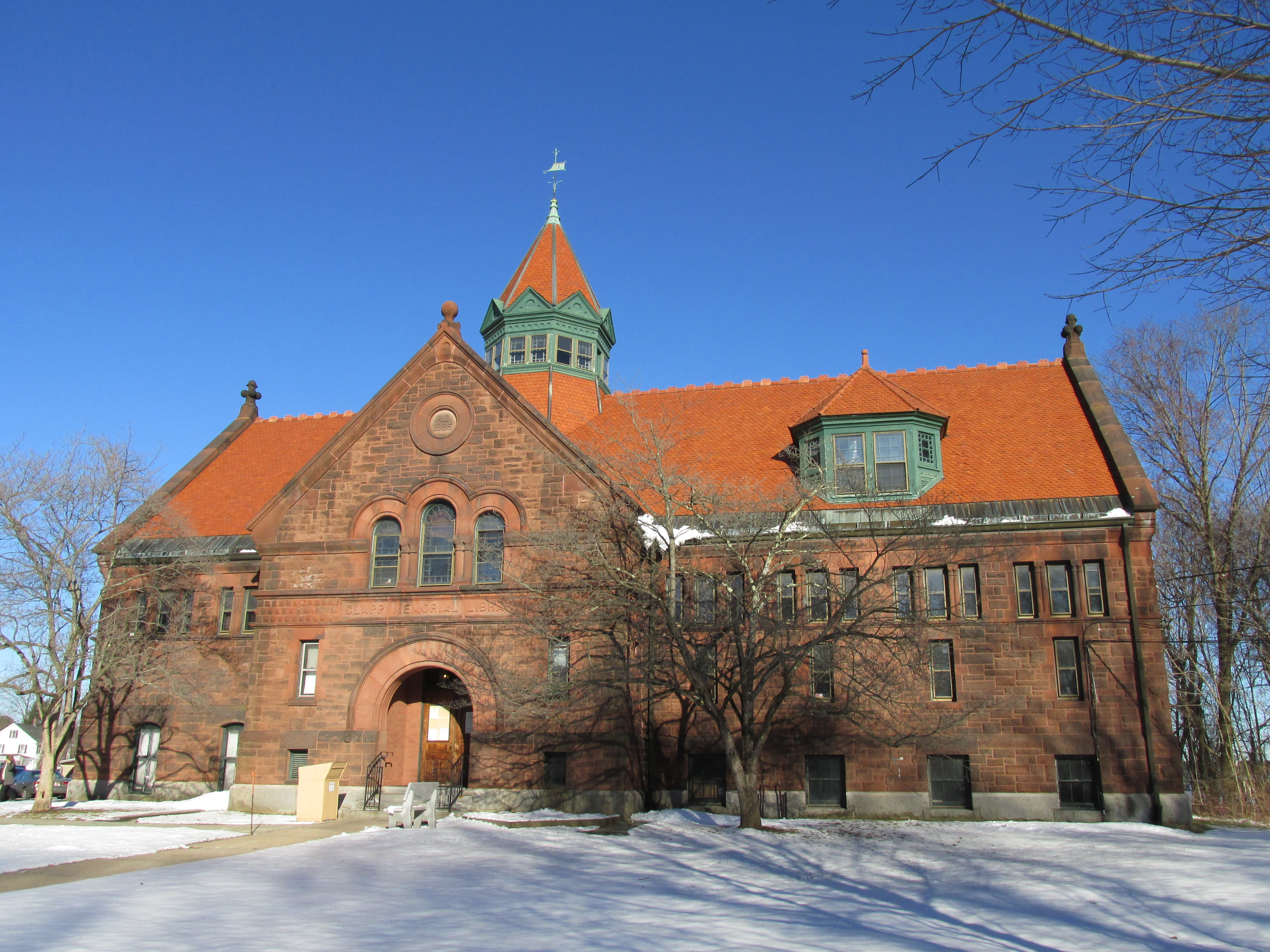
Clapp Memorial Library
- Belchertown Fair
- Belchertown Firefighters Museum
- Belchertown Greenway, part of the Mass Central Rail Trail
- Belchertown Public School System
- Belchertown Skate Park
- Belchertown State School
- Broad Brook Canal
- Clapp Memorial Library (Built in memory of John Francis Clapp in 1887 by two of his brothers. Clapp wished he had more resources for reading as a child and wished future generations of Belchertown residents would be able to have what he did not.)
- Carriage Grove (on former State School lands)
- Dwight (village)
- Jessica's Boundless Playground
- Holland Glen
- Holland Pond
- Lake Arcadia
- Lake Metacomet
- Lake Wallace (on former State School lands)
- Lake Wallace Sensory Trail (on former State School lands)
- Metacomet and Monadnock Trail, part of the New England Trail
- Mini Fenway Park
- Quabbin Reservoir
- Robert Frost Hiking Trail
- Scarborough Conservation Area
- Shelton Brothers Importers
- Skettersville Pond
- Stone House Museum
- Swift River
- Town Common
- Town Beach (Lake Arcadia)

== Notable people ==
- Frederick William Bardwell (1832-1878), U. S. Army Colonel who led the 3rd U. S. Colored Infantry Regiment during the American Civil War and professor of mathematics at Antioch College and the University of Kansas (born and raised in Belchertown)
- Newell Snow Booth (1903–1968), United Methodist missionary (born in Belchertown)
- Elijah Coleman Bridgman (1801–1862), first American Protestant missionary appointed to China (born in Belchertown)
- Albert Levi Burt (1843–1913), founder of the book publisher A. L. Burt
- Throope Chapman (1738–1794), soldier in the American Revolutionary War and among the first settlers of Dwight
- Justus Dwight (1739-1824), Antifederalist, Town politician, among the first settlers of Dwight
- Nathaniel Dwight (1712-1792), militia captain, surveyor, land owner, among the first to settle the Town Common area (by 1731)
- Addison G. Foster (1837–1917), US Senator (born in Belchertown)
- Justus Forward (1730-1814), minister of the Congregational Church in Belchertown for 59 years
- Gregory Gillespie (1936–2000), painter (died in Belchertown)
- Ira Chaffee Goodell (1800-1877), painter and folk artist (born and schooled in Dwight)
- Lafayette Washington Goodell (1851-1920), horticulturist and founder of Pansy Park in Dwight
- Nathaniel Dudley Goodell (1814-1895), American architect (born and raised in Dwight)
- Charles Warren Greene (1840–1920), journalist and author (born in Belchertown)
- Samuel Stillman Greene (1810–1883), educator, professor at Brown University (born in Belchertown)
- Jonathan Grout Jr. (1761-1825), lawyer who prototyped telegraph in Belchertown
- Joel Haver (1996- ), filmmaker and actor (raised in Belchertown)
- Josiah Gilbert Holland (1819–1881), author, editor, novelist, poet (born at Dwight)
- Arthur Bridgman Howard (1838–1907), American horticulturalist
- Raymond Kennedy (1934–2008), novelist (spent childhood in Belchertown in the 1930s)
- Myron Lawrence (1799-1852), politician (lived and died in Belchertown)
- Payson Williston Lyman (1842-1924), author, historian, politician, minister (lived in Belchertown)
- Charles Washburn Nichols (1883-1944) American writer and professor (born and raised in Belchertown)
- Charles Lawrence Robinson (1818-1894), American politician and first governor of Kansas (practiced medicine in, and married in Belchertown)
- Sara Tappan Doolittle Robinson (1827–1911), writer, historian, and inaugural First Lady of Kansas (born and raised in Belchertown)
- Porter Rockwell (1813-1878), "the Destroying Angel of Mormondom" and bodyguard of Mormon leader Joseph Smith (born in Dark Corner District, Belchertown)
- Mary F. Scranton (1832-1909), Methodist Episcopal Church missionary to Korea who founded Ewha Womans University, one of the most prestigious women's schools in Asia
- Ruth Sienkiewicz-Mercer (1950–1998), disability rights activist (resident of infamous Belchertown State School in the 1960s and 1970s)
- Ellen Goodell Smith (1835–1906), American hydropathic physician, vegetarian and writer
- Ethan Smith (1762–1849), clergyman and author who wrote a book that influenced the Mormons (born in Belchertown)
- Lucy Doolittle Thomson (1868–1943), writer, historian and among the first female American architects. A founder of the Belchertown Historical Association and the Stone House Museum (born, raised and lived here)
- Salem Towne (1779-1864), American educator and author (born and raised in Belchertown)
- Clinton Edgar Woods (1863–c. 1930), electrical and mechanical engineer, inventor, manufacturer of automobiles (born in Belchertown)
- Erastus Worthington (1779–1842), a politician, represented Dedham, Massachusetts in the Great and General Court (born in Belchertown).
