= Frederick William Bardwell =

Professor and Army colonel (1832-1878)

Frederick William Bardwell (March 13, 1832 – August 17, 1878) was a professor of astronomy, mathematics and engineering at the University of Kansas who led the 3rd U. S. Colored Infantry Regiment, raised in Philadelphia, during the American Civil War.

== Life ==
=== Early life and education ===
Bardwell was born in Belchertown, Massachusetts, in 1832, in the Bardwell Homestead at a section known as the Bardwell Hollow, that became part of Jabish Street. The Bardwell family developed an early ironworks that was said to have produced materials for the Continental Army during the Revolutionary War, laying the groundwork for Belchertown's later carriage industry.

Frederick Bardwell was "fitted for college under the instruction of the then well-known sage and philosopher of Dark Corner, the late Ozias Norcross." According to a published biography, he entered the junior class at Harvard University and was graduated in 1856.

=== American Civil War ===
He was a professor of mathematics at Antioch College, Ohio, until the outbreak of the Civil War at which time he enlisted in General Grant's regiment, the 10th Ohio. He served through the war and was discharged with the rank of colonel.

Another biography asserts that Bardwell enlisted in the army on April 17, 1861, five days after the Civil War began. He was mustered into 2nd Ohio as a private. Seven months later, he was promoted to 2nd lieutenant in the 10th Light Artillery Battery attached to the 74th Ohio Volunteer Infantry.

After two years' service, Bardwell re-enlisted, this time accepting a commission as a Major in the 3rd U. S. Colored Infantry Regiment. By the time he mustered out after the war's end, he was a full colonel and in command of the unit.

=== Post-war career ===
After the war, Bardwell worked with the government observatory at Washington, D.C. before accepting the professorship of mathematics, engineering and astronomy at Kansas University, Lawrence, Kansas. It was here that he reunited with fellow former Belchertown residents politician Charles L. Robinson and Sarah T. D. Robinson, writer, historian and First Lady of Kansas. Bardwell died while on an expedition in Colorado to view an eclipse in 1878. He is buried in the Oak Hill Cemetery in Lawrence with his wife and two daughters.

Bardwell published research papers in astronomy and a text book on arithmetic, a copy of which is in the Stone House Museum library in Belchertown.
