= Charles Nichols =

Charles Nichols may refer to:

- Charles Archibald Nichols (1876–1920), politician from the U.S. state of Michigan
- Charles August Nichols (1910–1992), American animator and film director
- Kid Nichols (Charles Augustus Nichols, 1869–1953), Major League Baseball pitcher and Hall of Famer
- Charles D. Nichols, American pharmacologist and psychedelic researcher
- C. Walter Nichols, American chemist
- Charles Washburn Nichols (1883–1944), American poet, writer and professor of English
