= Jonathan Grout Jr. =

Developer of first telegraph (1761–1825)

Jonathan Grout Jr. (January 22, 1761—March 12, 1825) built the first optical telegraph in the United States, connecting Martha's Vineyard and Boston.

He was born in Lunenburg, Massachusetts, and studied law in his father's office in Petersham and moved to Belchertown, "where he hung out his shingle in 1792." He purchased a home on the Common, one of the higher places in town, and experimented with the semaphore method of telegraphy developed by Julian Corbett.

He erected signal stations on Great Quabbin Mountain in Enfield and on Mount Holyoke. The semaphore signal stations, about ten miles apart, made Belchertown Center a logical location of a station between these two points.

In the fall of 1801 he completed the first long-distance telegraph in the country and almost within sighting distance of Boston. It could deliver a complex message from West Chop on Martha's Vineyard to Boston in under 10 minutes. Two decades before Samuel Morse developed his own telegraph, Grout patented in October 1800 what he called the “Telegraphe." He began selling subscriptions and developed a news service.

He moved to Philadelphia thereafter to become a literary man and teacher, where he died on March 12, 1825, credited with being a "professor of Grammar." There was no mention of his telegraphic achievements, but nevertheless the obituary called him "a very respectable old gent."
