= Payson Williston Lyman =

Minister, author, politician (1842–1924)

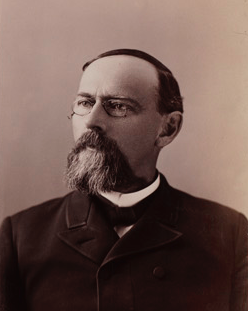
Payson Williston Lyman in 1888.

Payson Williston Lyman (February 28, 1842 – April 15, 1924) was a pastor, historian, editorial writer for The Fall River Evening News and a member of the Massachusetts State Legislature in 1888. He was born in Belchertown, Massachusetts, according to The New York Times, though other sources place his birth in Easthampton. His third-great-uncle was Deacon Aaron Lyman (1705-1780), among the first to settle in Belchertown near the Cold Spring, where he ran a tavern.

Payson graduated from Williston Seminary and from Amherst College with honors in 1867. He attended the Union Theological Seminary, was ordained and "took up his first pastorate" at the Congregational Church in Belchertown in 1870. He married Caroline Eliza Root, of Belchertown, on August 6, 1873, in Belchertown. They had five children, all born here. Two sons survived him.

In 1889, he went to the Fowler Congregational Church in Fall River, Massachusetts, resigning after 25 years in 1914. He was an active worker in behalf of the Near East relief funds.

He wrote a history of Easthampton, Massachusetts, published in 1866, and gave several important addresses, including "The 150th anniversary of the incorporation of the town of Belchertown, July 2, 3 and 4, 1911; a sketch of the celebration and the Historical address (Press of L.H. Blackmer, 1912)."

He begins his 22-page essay on Fall River in The New England Magazine, published in the May 1901 issue, thus: "THERE is probably no other city on our entire seaboard which has so remarkable a conjunction of water power and water transportation as the city of Fall River, the largest cotton manufacturing centre in America."

He was said to write "almost up to the time of his death, sending copy from his hospital bed," according to The New York Times.
