= Belchertown Center Historic District =

Historic district in Massachusetts, United States

- U.S. National Register of Historic Places
- U.S. Historic district
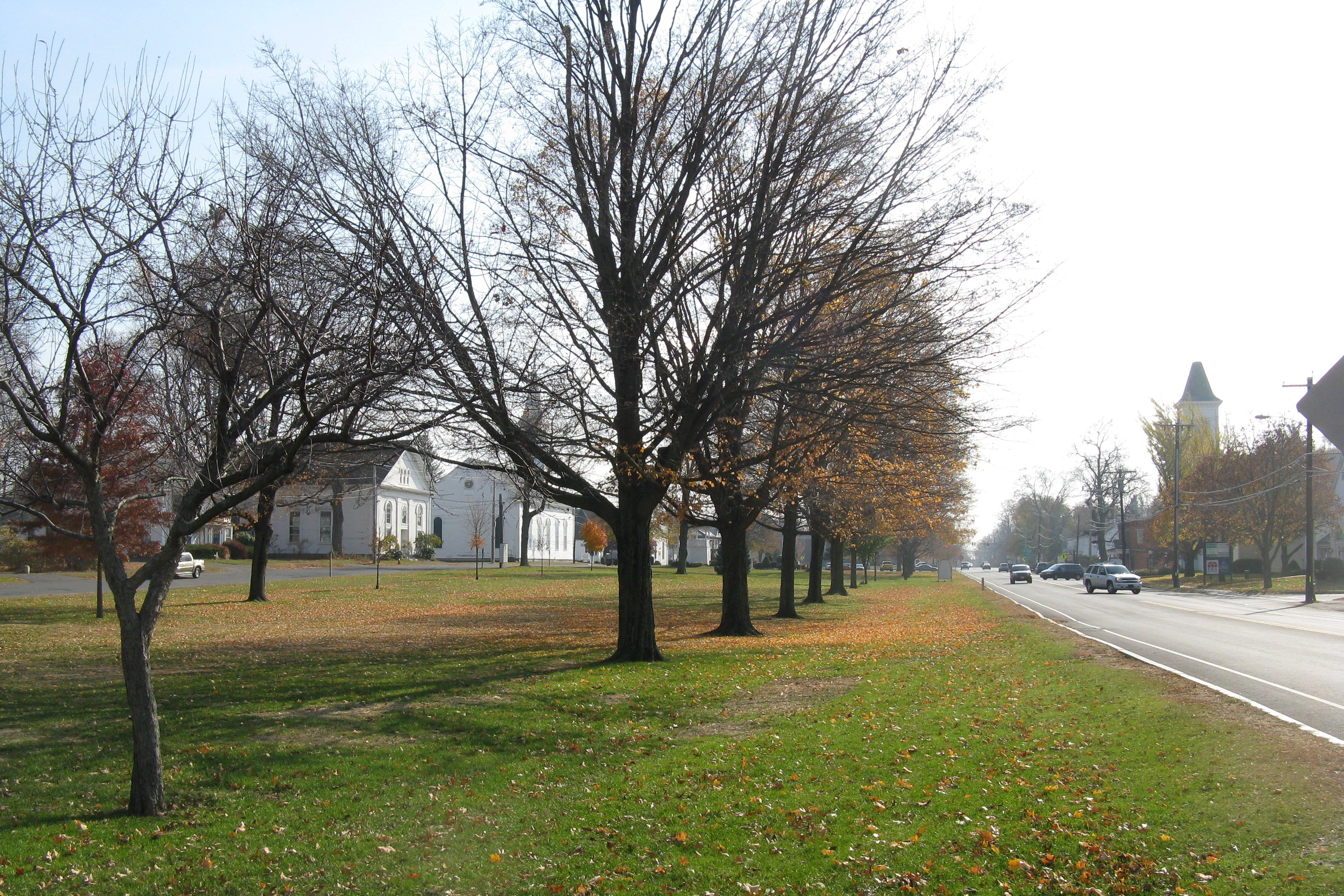
- Belchertown Common

- Location within Massachusetts Location within the United States
- Location: Belchertown, Massachusetts
- Coordinates: 42°16′37″N 72°24′6″W
- Architectural style: Greek Revival, Late Victorian, Federal
- NRHP reference No.: 82001913
- Added to NRHP: June 2, 1982

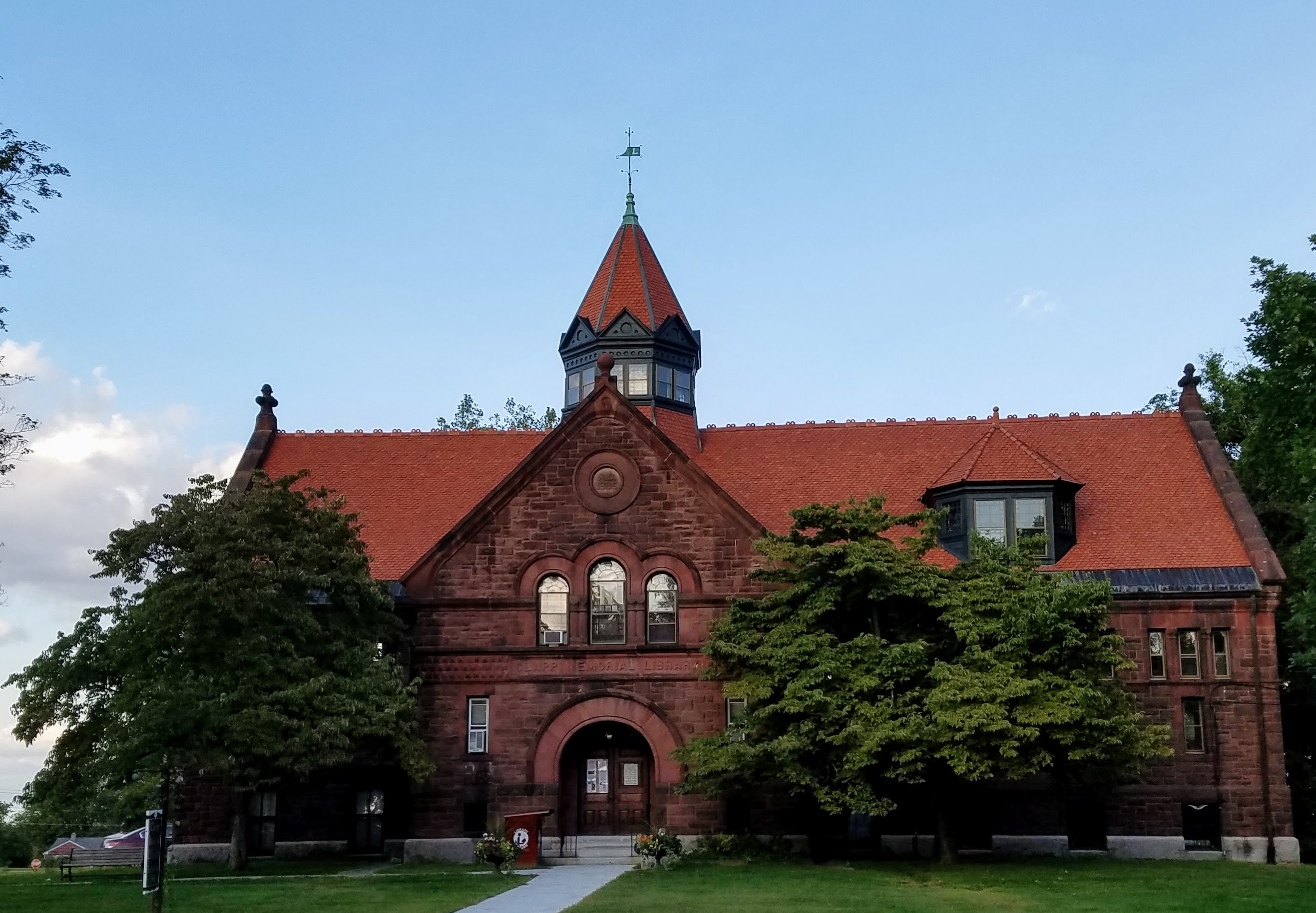
The Clapp Memorial Library

The Belchertown Center Historic District is a historic district which encompasses the historic village center of Belchertown, Massachusetts. Centered on Belchertown's 1,200-foot (370 m) common, the district includes 55 contributing properties along South Main Street, Maple Street, and a few adjacent streets. It was listed on the National Register of Historic Places in 1982.

The centerpiece of the district is the Belchertown common. The common features a bandstand, built in the 19th century, a memorial to the town's Civil War fallen, a cannon and flagpole, and a small parking lot. It is lined with 24 wood frame and 3 brick houses. Most of these buildings date to the 18th and early 19th century, and exhibit Georgian and Federal styling.

Buildings arrayed on South Main Street were built mostly from the middle of the 19th century to its end. Most of them have Greek Revival styling, but this portion of the district contains the only notable examples of Queen Anne architecture, as well as the Clapp Memorial Library, designed by H.F. Kilburn. Along Maple Street most of the houses are also of the same period, although there are also some that date to early in the 20th century. Maple Street also features the Stone House Museum, Belchertown's only stone house (home of the Belchertown Historical Association) and its only Carpenter Gothic building, the 1886 Towne House.

The district includes both Belchertown's Old Town Hall (c. 1865, Greek Revival), and its "new" one, Lawrence Memorial Hall (1923, Gothic revival). There are three churches in the district: the Congregational Church (the town's oldest church, c. 1789–92), a Methodist church building moved from Springfield in 1872, and a Roman Catholic church (built as a second Congregational meeting house in 1836 after a schism).

== See also ==
- National Register of Historic Places listings in Hampshire County, Massachusetts
