= Arthur B. Howard =

American horticulturalist

- Born: June 1, 1838; Belchertown, Massachusetts, United States
- Died: December 20, 1907 (aged 69); Belchertown, Massachusetts, United States
- Known for: America's foremost strawberry breeder of his time
- Notable work: Howard 17 (Premier) variety
- Awards: Marshall Wilder Medal for notable fruit varieties

Arthur Bridgman Howard (1 June 1838 – 1907) was an American horticulturalist.

Howard was born 1 June 1838 (Note: Sometimes cited as 1836 or 1837.) on a farm in Belchertown, Massachusetts to Silas Howard and Naomi S. Town Howard. He married Minnie M. Chandler on 1 September 1874.

Howard was America's foremost strawberry breeder of his time. His Howard 17 (Premier) variety is the ancestor of most American strawberries today. Howard was one of the few breeders before 1900 to use systematic methods. He wrote many horticultural articles for the New England Homestead, the leading agricultural paper of that time. S.T. Maynard, a close friend of Howard, was the first horticulture professor of Massachusetts. Howard's son, Everett, joined the effort to develop a variety of plants. The Howard 17 was selected from about 800 seedlings from a cross made in 1904. Unfortunately, Howard died before his strawberry was named and introduced. Other plants that were named and introduced were the Howard apple, Howard Star Petunia, Royal Splendor Verbena, Lilliput Zinnia, and the Bay State tomato. In 1929, the American Pomological Society gave the Marshall Wilder Medal for notable fruit varieties to A.B. Howard and Son for Premier or Howard 17 as the most widely grown of all strawberries, 1908.

Howard died on 11 June or 20 December 1907 in Belchertown, Massachusetts.
