= Newell Snow Booth =

Methodist bishop and missionary

- Church: Methodist Episcopal Church
- Diocese: Bishop of Harrisburg, Pennsylvania
- In office: 1964–1968
- Previous post: Bishop for Africa (1944-1964)

Orders
- Ordination: 1926

Personal details
- Born: June 14, 1903 Belchertown, Massachusetts
- Died: May 17, 1968 (aged 64) Harrisburg, Pennsylvania
- Buried: Belchertown, Massachusetts
- Denomination: Methodist
- Parents: Charles Edwin Booth and Elizabeth M Booth
- Spouse: Esma M Rideout
- Children: Newell Snow Booth Junior and Esma-Marie Booth and Dell Edwin Booth
- Occupation: Missionary and bishop
- Education: Boston University & Hartford Seminary

Newell Snow Booth (June 14, 1903 – May 17, 1968) was an American missionary and bishop for the United Methodist Church (UMC). Booth worked as a minister in Massachusetts for the Methodist Episcopal Church (MEC) before joining that church's missionary program. He served in the Belgian Congo for 13 years before returning to head the African department of the Hartford Seminary Foundation. Booth was appointed bishop of Africa for the UMC (into which the MEC had merged) in 1943 and returned to the Congo. He oversaw the construction of medical facilities and wrote textbooks in the Bantu languages. Shortly after being detained at gunpoint during the Congo Crisis he returned to the United States. Appointed Bishop of Harrisburg, Pennsylvania he also served on numerous church boards and commissions and was a church representative on the National Council of Churches, the World Methodist Council and the International African Institute.

== Early life ==
Newell Snow Booth was born in Belchertown, Massachusetts, on June 14, 1903, and was a descendant of the Mayflower Pilgrim John Alden. His parents were Charles Edwin Booth and Elizabeth M. Booth; he was given his mother's maiden name as his middle name. Booth graduated from Boston University with a Bachelor of Arts degree in 1924. As a student he was a member of the Beta Chi Sigma and Phi Beta Kappa fraternities.

Booth married Esma M. Rideout on December 28, 1925, and they had three children: Newell Snow Junior, Esma-Marie and Dell Edwin, who died in Kanene at age 2. Booth Senior was ordained by the Methodist Episcopal Church in 1926 and afterwards served as a pastor in Bryantville, Duxbury, New Bedford and Freetown in Massachusetts within the church's New England Southern Conference. Booth received a bachelor of sacred theology degree in 1927 and a master of sacred theology degree in 1930.

== In Africa ==
In 1930 Booth joined the church's Board of Foreign Missions as a missionary. He served as superintendent of the church's mission to the Belgian Congo and as principal of the Congo Training Institute. Shortly after arriving he traveled to the first annual conference of the Congo church; necessitating a 278 miles (447 km) trip from Kanene to Kapanga in an old Model T Ford over 108 bridges, some in poor repair. Booth was awarded a doctor of philosophy degree from Hartford Seminary in 1936 and in 1939 became part of the United Methodist Church (UMC) after the Methodist Episcopal Church merged with two other churches. Booth returned to the United States in 1943 and served for the next year as head of the African department of the Hartford Seminary.

Booth was elected the UMC Bishop for Africa in 1944 and returned to the continent to carry out this role. His remit extended across southern Africa and included Mozambique, South Africa, Angola, Southern Rhodesia and the Belgian Congo. The church grew quickly and eventually three other bishops were elected to take over part of the territory, leaving Booth with responsibility for the Congo alone. Based out of Élisabethville Booth oversaw the fundraising and construction of the Bishop Lambuth Memorial Medical Center at Wembo Nyama and the Dell Edwin Booth Memorial Medical Center at Kanene; the latter replacing a dispensary based in an old structure with wards spread across 20 grass huts. He wrote several books including The Cross Over Africa (1945) and This is Africa South of the Sahara (1959) and co-edited Abundant Life in Changing Africa (1946). Booth also published textbooks in the Bantu languages, in which he was fluent, and could also speak three other African languages as well as French and Portuguese. In 1964, during the Congo Crisis, he was stopped by soldiers, thrown into a ditch, and threatened at gunpoint until an officer recognized him and ordered his release. Later that year he returned to the United States.

== Later life ==
Upon his return to the United States Booth was appointed Bishop of Harrisburg, Pennsylvania by the UMC, having responsibility for 620 churches with 130,000 members. During this time he also served on the church's General Board of Education and the General Board of Lay Activities as well as a representative to the General Assembly of the National Council of Churches, the World Methodist Council and the International African Institute. Booth chaired the UMC Interboard Committee on Missionary Education and was vice chairman of the Commission on Town and Country Work. He was also a trustee of Lycoming College, Dickinson College and the Wesley Theological Seminary.

Booth died, following a long illness, at the Polyclinic Medical Center in Harrisburg on May 17, 1968. His funeral was held on May 20 at Grace United Methodist Church in the city and was presided over by Lloyd Christ Wicke, Bishop of New York. Booth was buried the following day in Belchertown. His medals and pins from the church, denoting his rank, are held in the collection of Dickinson College. Booth's son Newell Snow Junior followed his father to become a minister in the Methodist church and was also a member of the faculty of Miami University.
