= George Eugene Eager =

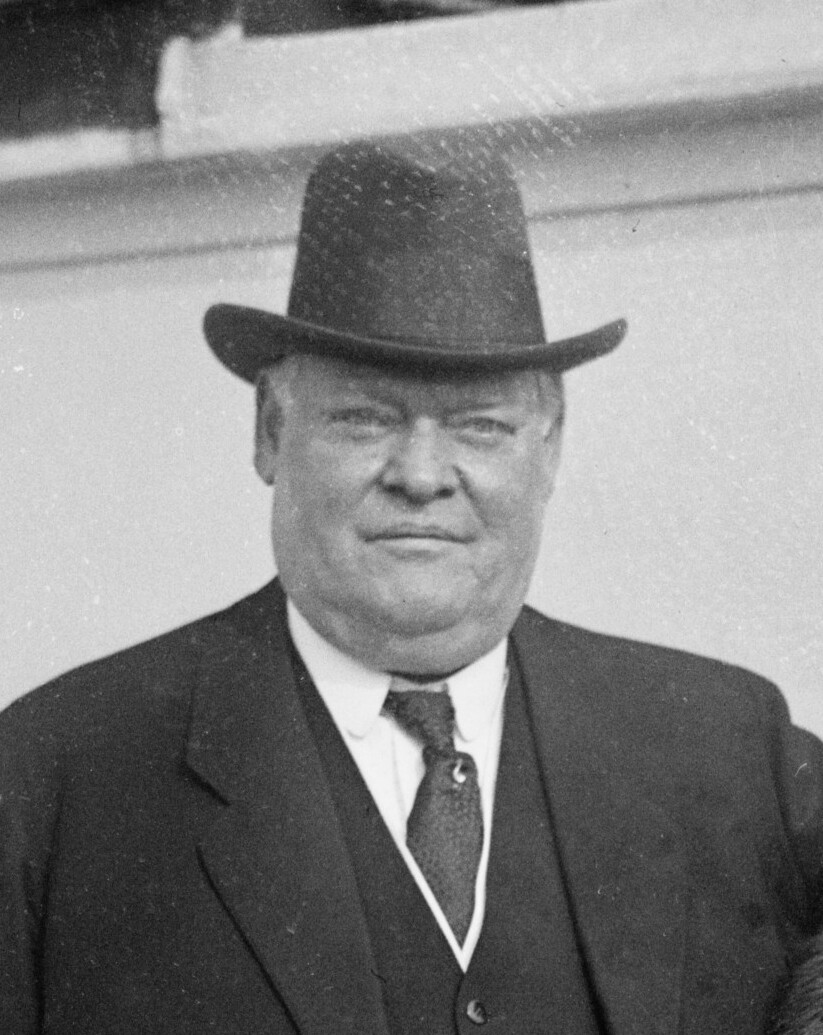
George Eugene Eager on October 31, 1916, aboard the Noordam

George Eugene Eager (1859 – August 21, 1919) was the U.S. Consul in Barmen, Germany from 1907 to 1917 during World War I.

== Biography ==
He was born on March 15, 1859, in Enfield, Massachusetts, to Clarissa Adaline and John Davis Eager. His siblings were Frederic Cutting Eager, Edwin Louis Eager, and William Eager. He married Ruth Fides Spalding on June 11, 1900, in Norwich, Connecticut.

He was the U.S. Consul in Barmen, Germany, from 1914 to 1917 during World War I.

He died on August 21, 1919, in Chicago.
