= Charles Warren Greene =

American journalist and author

Charles Warren Greene (1840 – 1920) was an American journalist and author, born in Belchertown, Massachusetts.

He graduated from Brown University in 1863 and received his M.D. from Dartmouth College in 1867. He wrote much on natural science for encyclopedias and was an editor of various works, such as Lippincott's Gazetteer (1879), Worcester's New School Dictionary (1883), and Lippincott's Biographical Dictionary (1886).

His writings also include:

- Animals: Their Homes and Habits (1886)
- Birds: Their Homes and Habits (1886)
- Beacon gems for you; or, The philosophy of housekeeping (1888)
- American Indians (1888)
- Foods for the fat; a treatise on corpulency and a dietary for its cure (1889)
- Irrigation in the western United States of America considered as an investment (1890)
- The Bear River Valley, Utah ....
