= Clapp Memorial Library =

Library in Belchertown, Massachusetts

Coordinates: 42.2763°N 72.3997°W

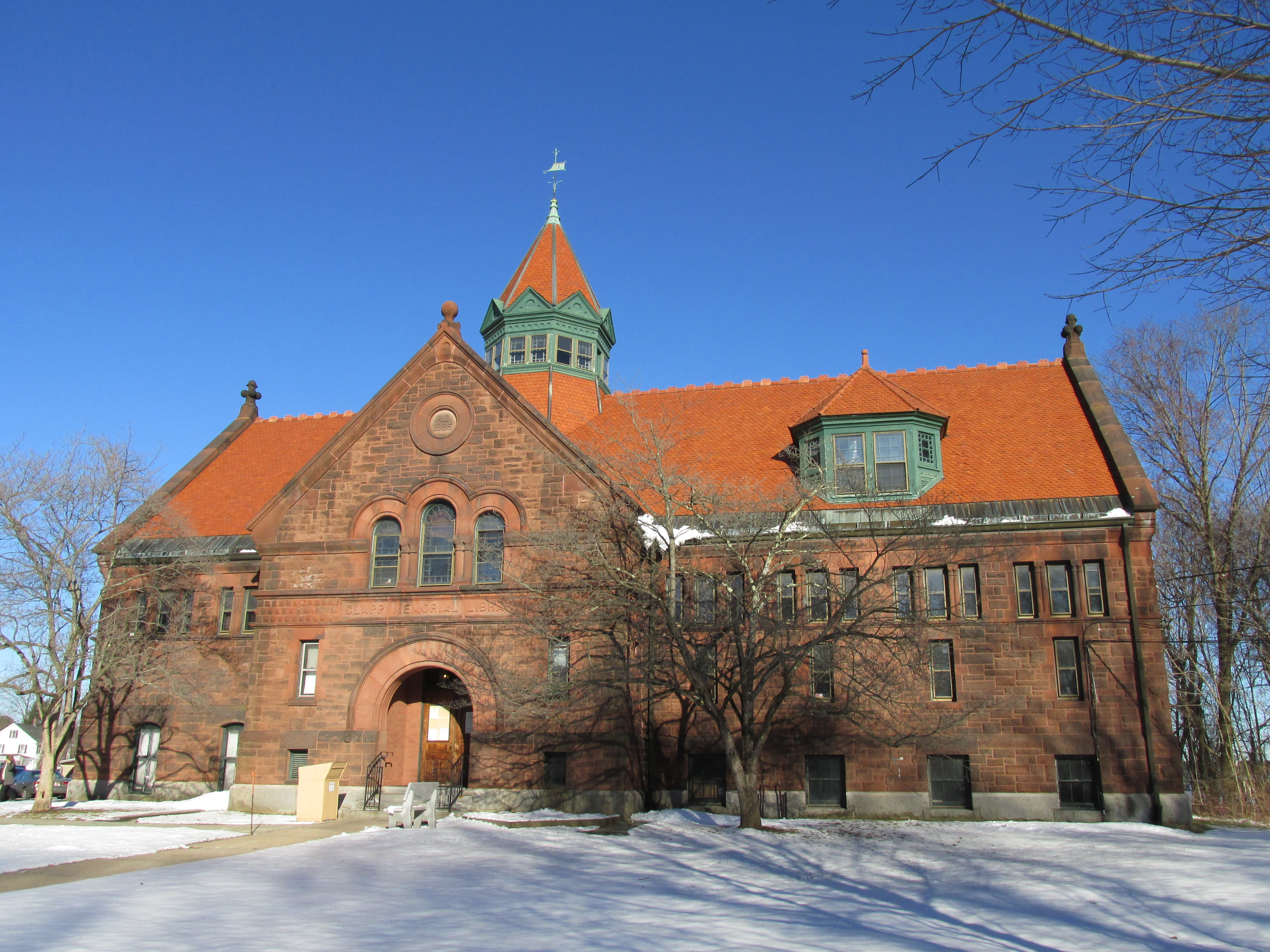
Clapp Memorial Library in 2013

The Clapp Memorial Library is a public library in Belchertown, Massachusetts.

Construction began in 1884; it was dedicated in 1887. Today the Library is part of the Belchertown Center Historic District.

Belchertown native John Francis Clapp (1818-1882), a wealthy merchant who died in Brooklyn, bequeathed $40,000 for the erection of a library with 5,000 books from his personal collections.

Clapp was said to be convalescing in the home of Dr. George F. Thomson, the Town physician who lived across South Main Street from where the library would be erected, when Clapp "formed plans" for the building.

Designed by New York architect H.F. Kilburn in the Richardsonian Romanesque style, the Library takes the form of a Latin cross and features two large, stained glass windows as well as an eighty-foot-high tower in the center of the building.

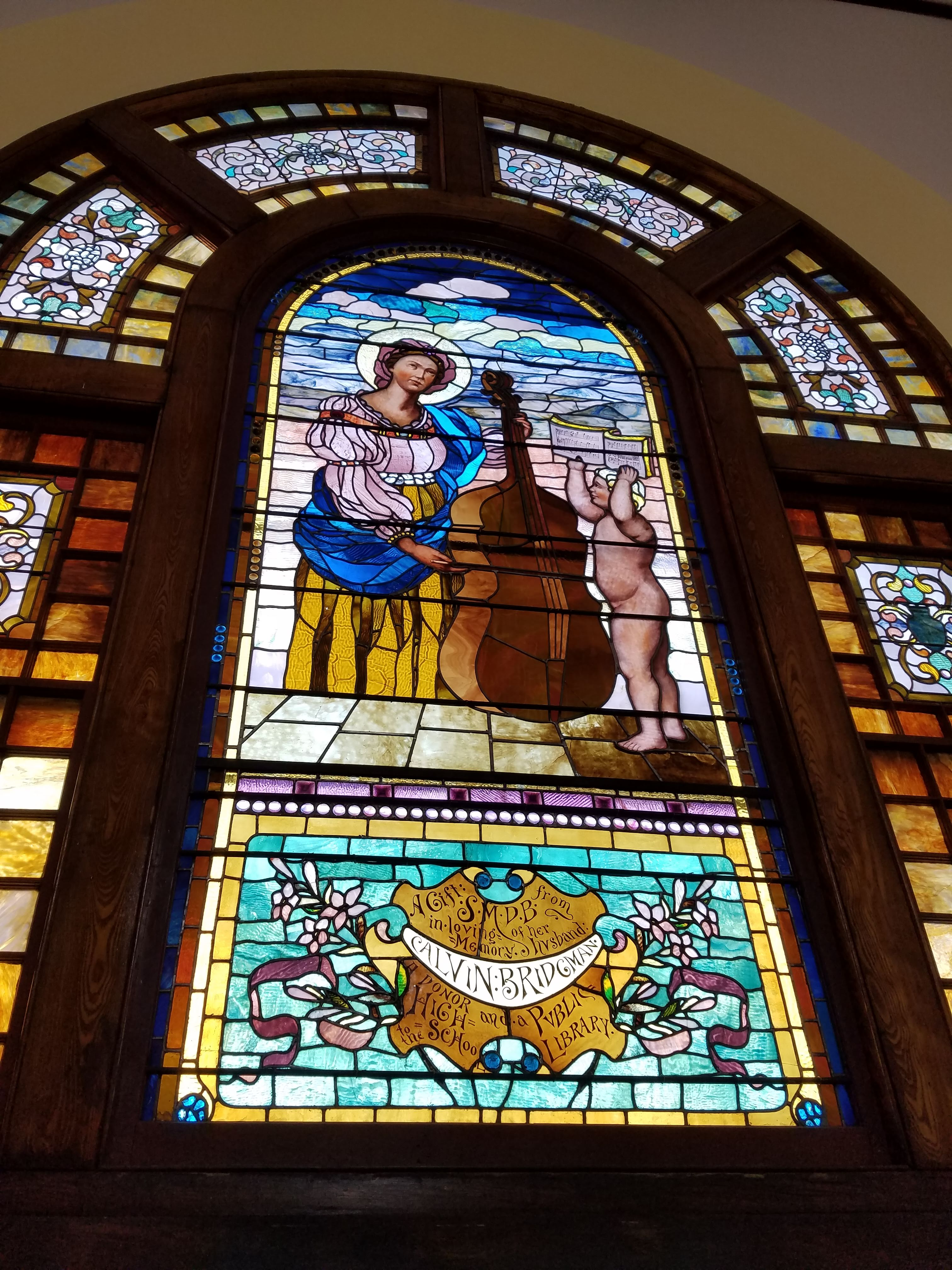
Clapp Memorial Library north window depicting Saint Cecilia, patroness of music. It is thought to have been fabricated by H.E. Hartwell, a New York decorator and designer, and was presented to the library by Susan Bridgman, one of the original library trustees.

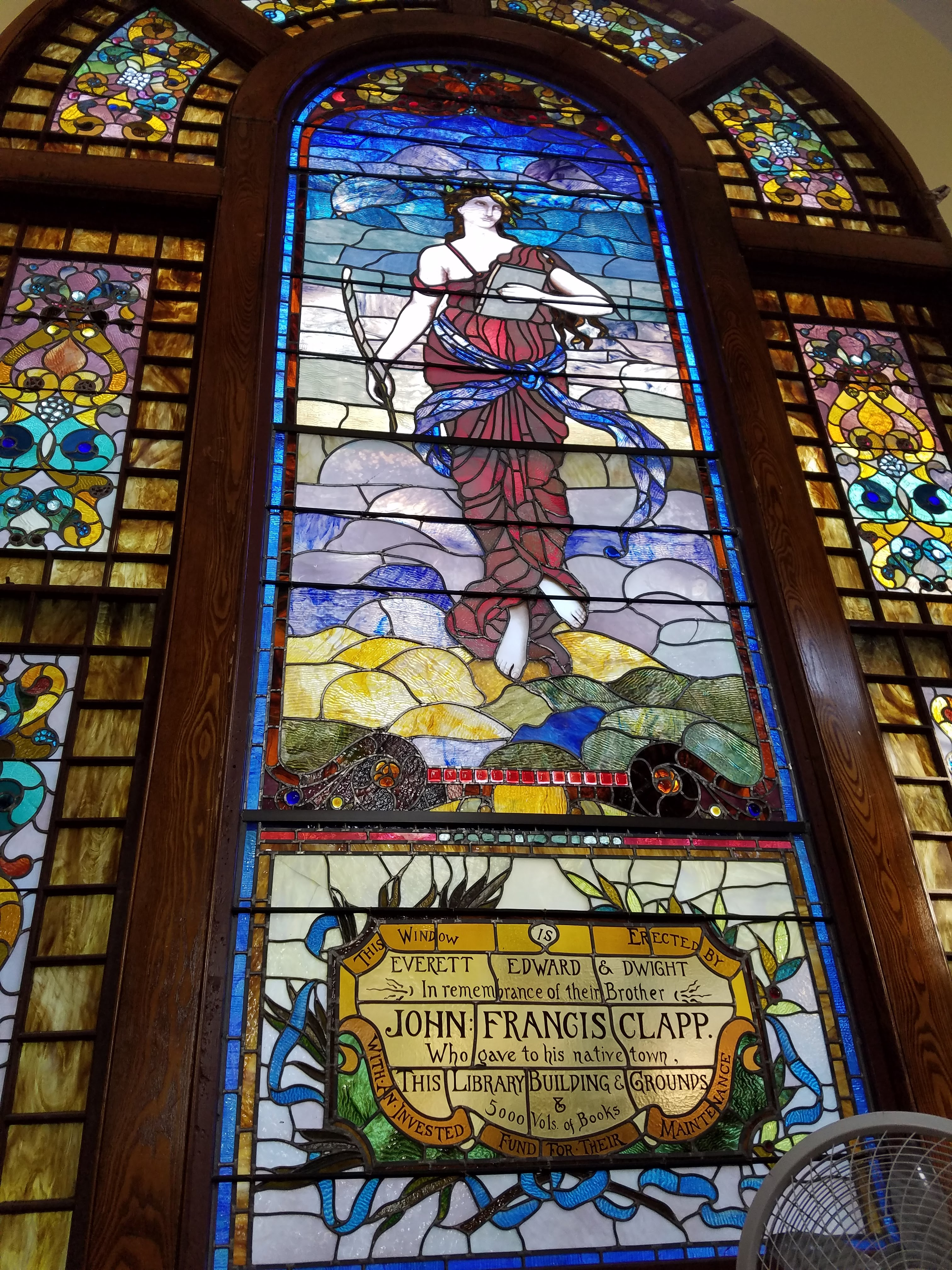
Clapp Memorial Library south window, depicting literature as a figure in thought and repose. This window is dedicated to the memory of John Francis Clapp and is thought to have been fabricated by H.E. Hartwell, a New York decorator and designer.

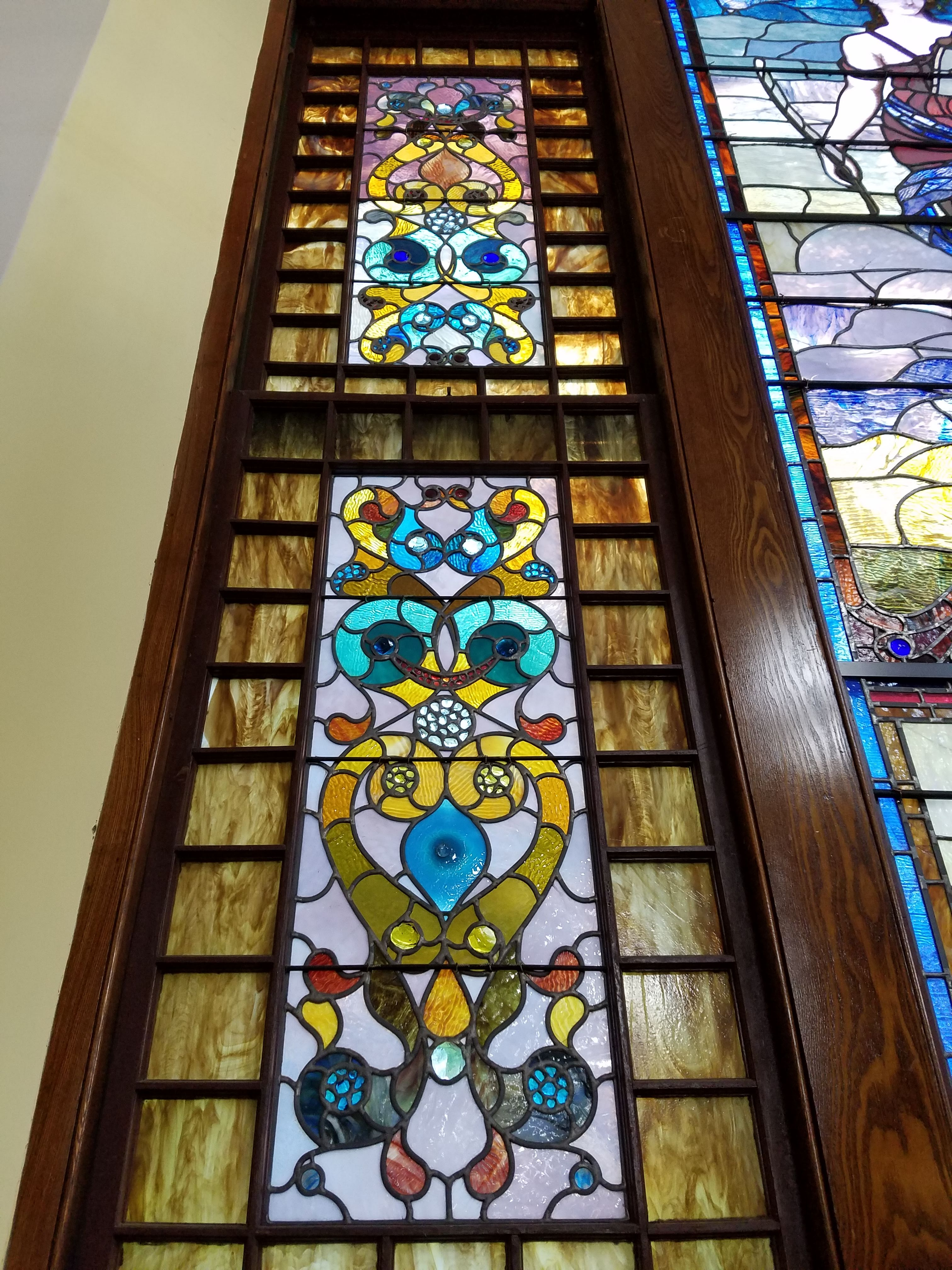

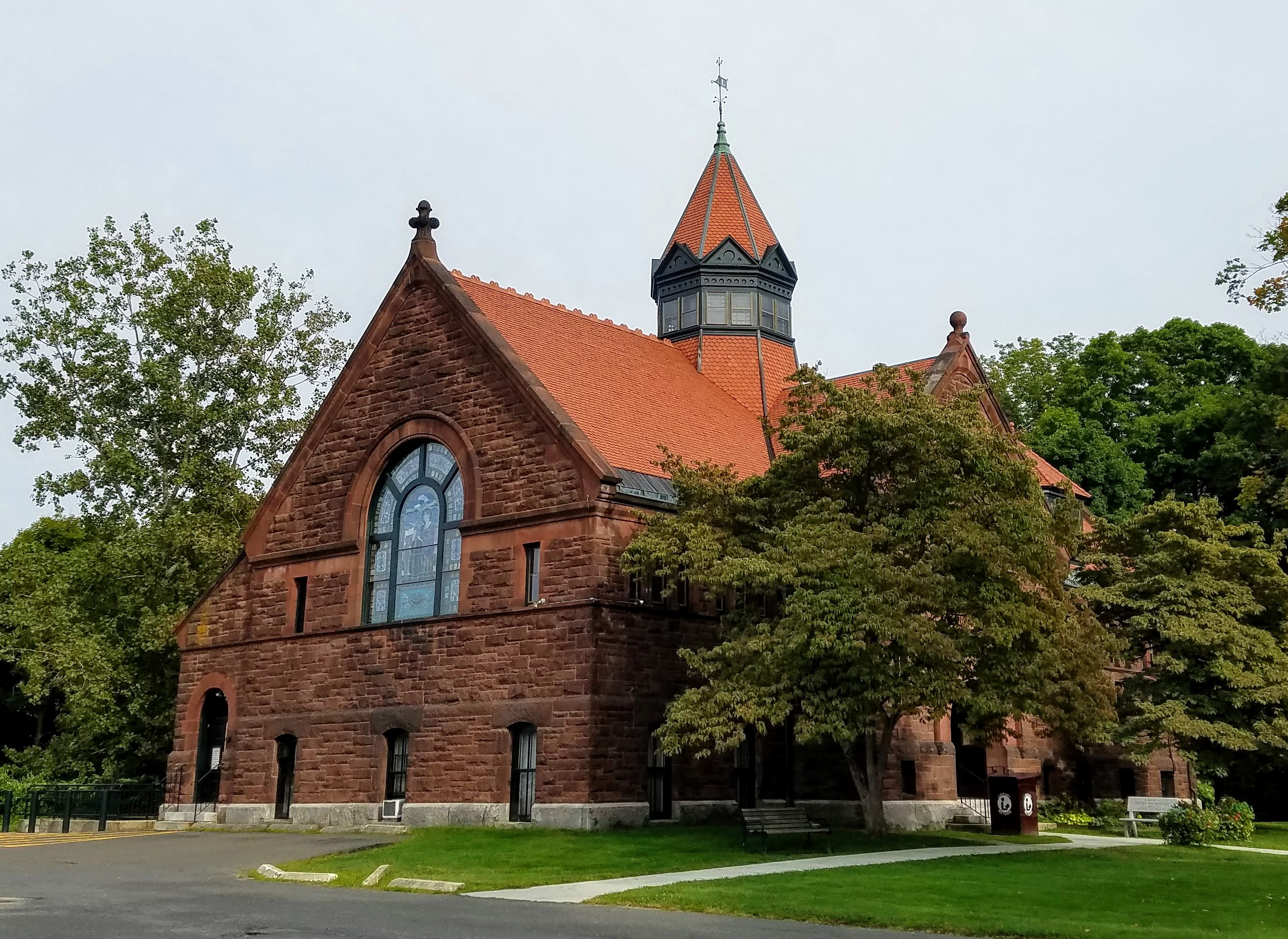
Clapp Memorial Library

Constructed by the Bartlett Brothers of Whately, MA, the building features primarily local materials, including the brownstone from Longmeadow, MA, the brick trim from Holyoke, MA, and the stained glass windows, made from sand and silica from Western Massachusetts.

James Clapp's brothers donated $8,000 for the construction with another $8,200 donated by Calvin Bridgman, Susan Bridgman, Amarilla Bascom and Harriette Dwight Longley. Much of Longley's estate went to the Belchertown Historical Association, which developed the Stone House Museum. In 1911, the library was said to have more books per capita than any other town in the state.

At the June 30, 1887, dedication, brother Dwight Clapp told the gathered townspeople and dignitaries to "do what little we can in our day to make life in this old hill town of New England richer and broader, higher and nobler, sweeter and purer, to generations which come after us."

The first librarian was Lydia A. Barton, who served from 1887 until her death in 1911. The building is not owned or maintained by the town, but rather by the Trustees of the Library.

In 2014, the library was visited by the team behind the hit show, "Ghost Hunters" where the program dove into the history of Belchertown and the library itself. The episode can be viewed on SyFY's website.

Today, the library hosts an array of clubs, book sales, classes, lectures, local school programs and community events.
