= Enfield, Massachusetts =

- Town
- "The end of Enfield", a photograph of downtown Enfield, after 1938

- Seal
- Interactive map of Enfield, Massachusetts
- Coordinates: 42°19′0″N 72°19′58″W
- Country: United States
- State: Massachusetts
- County: Hampshire
- Incorporated: February 15, 1816
- Disincorporated: April 28, 1938
- Time zone: UTC-5 (Eastern)
  - Summer (DST): Eastern
- GNIS feature ID: 617477

Enfield was a town in Hampshire County, Massachusetts, United States. The town was lost as a result of the creation of the Quabbin Reservoir.

== History ==
Incorporated in 1816 from portions of Greenwich and Belchertown. It was named in honor of one of its early settlers, Robert Field. General Joseph Hooker, Union general during the American Civil War, was once a resident, and his grandfather was once a town leader. It was centered at the junction of the east and west branches of the Swift River, and the Athol Branch of the Boston and Albany Railroad ran through the town. The town bordered six other towns—Belchertown, Pelham, Greenwich, Prescott, Ware, and Hardwick.

Enfield was disincorporated on April 28, 1938, and portions of the town were annexed to the adjacent towns of Belchertown, New Salem, Pelham, and Ware. (Not all of the former town is now in Hampshire County: the portion ceded to New Salem is now in Franklin County.) At the town's final ball, the band played Auld Lang Syne. When the song ended, the town became a part of Belchertown.

The headquarters of the Metropolitan District Commission during the construction of the Quabbin Reservoir was located in the former town hall and was the last building razed in the Swift River Valley, in 1940. The majority of the town center now lies submerged beneath the reservoir, although the Quabbin Observatory and Enfield Lookout, located on scenic Quabbin Hill, as well as the main entrance and headquarters of Quabbin State Park, a popular tourist destination with an emphasis on state history and nature, are all within the former town's limits.

Enfield House, an on-campus living facility at Hampshire College in Amherst, Massachusetts, is named after the former town.

== Enfield in popular culture ==
- Much of the novel Infinite Jest takes place in a city called Enfield, Mass.; David Foster Wallace has confirmed that he took the name from the town, but geographic cues make clear that the town in the novel is not the actual Enfield and is instead a fictional stand-in for Brighton. The Enfield Tennis Academy and Ennet House, major locations in the novel, are located there.
- Mark Erelli's song "The Farewell Ball" (from the album Hillbilly Pilgrim) wistfully recalls the town's final ball from the perspective of a former resident of Enfield.
- Someday by Jackie French Koller is a children's book about the history of Enfield. It is about a girl who has to move from Enfield so they can flood the town to make a drinking water reservoir for Boston.

== Notable people ==
- George Eugene Eager (1859–1919), U.S. Consul

== Photos ==
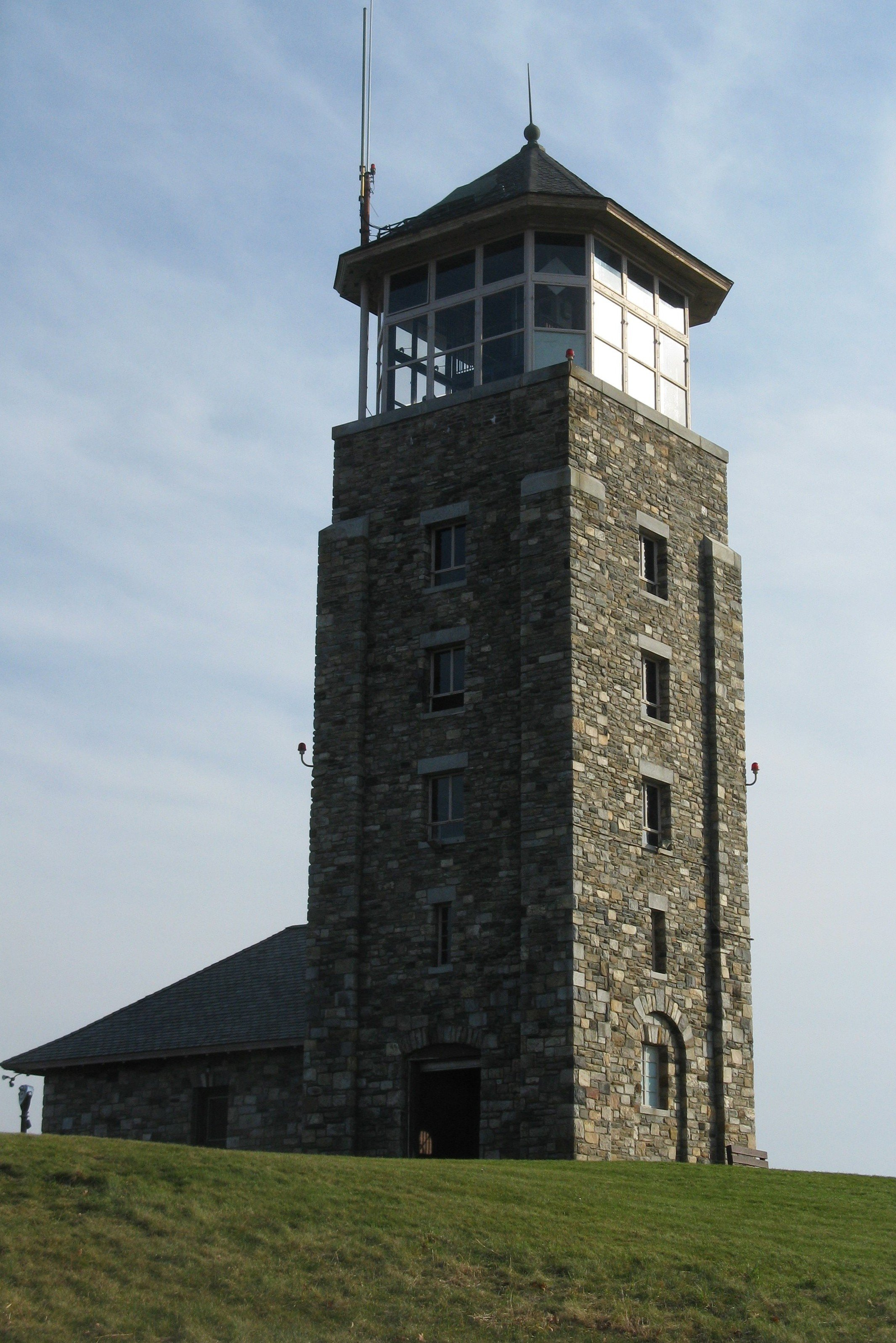
Quabbin Observatory

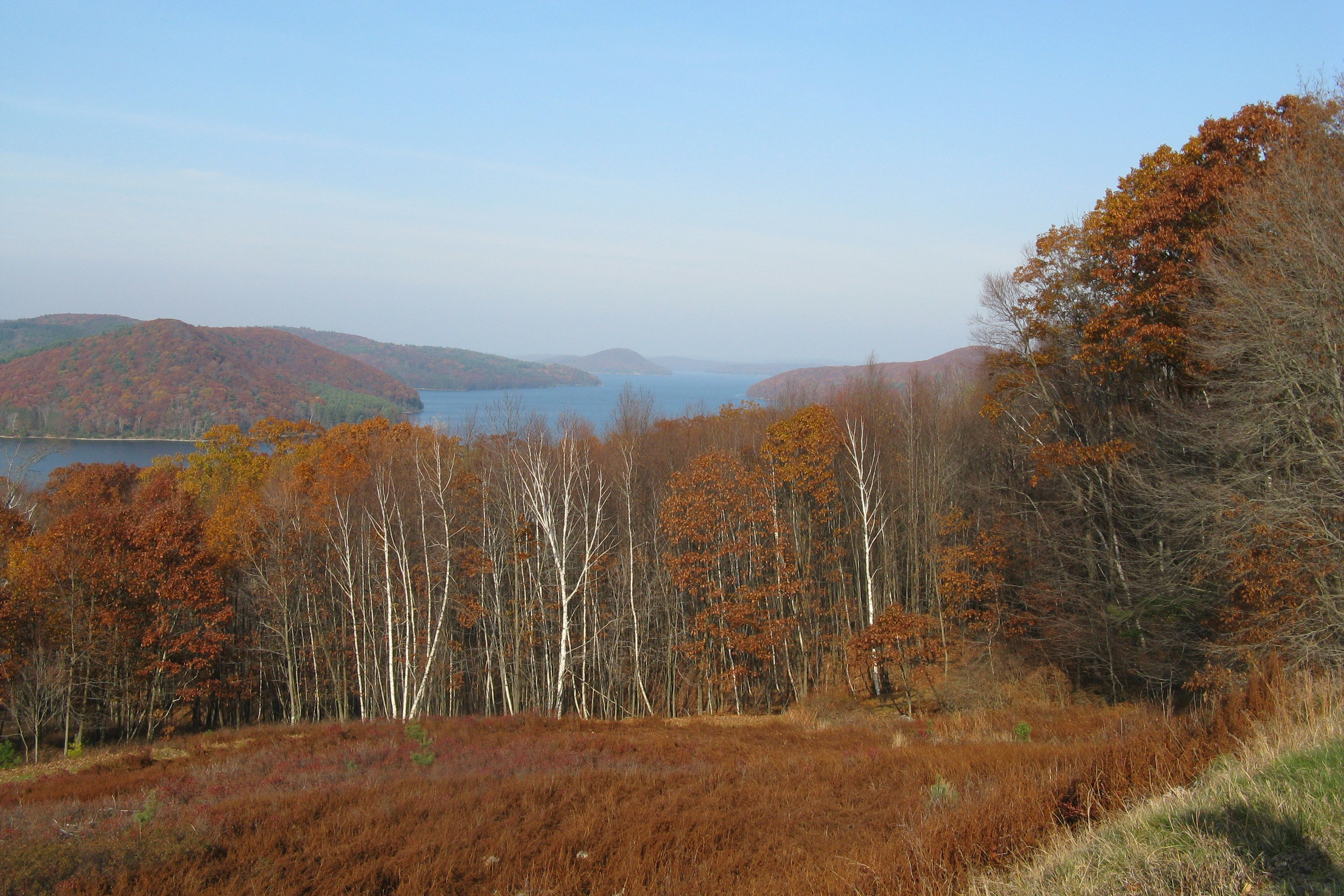
Overlooking Quabbin Reservoir from Quabbin Hill Road

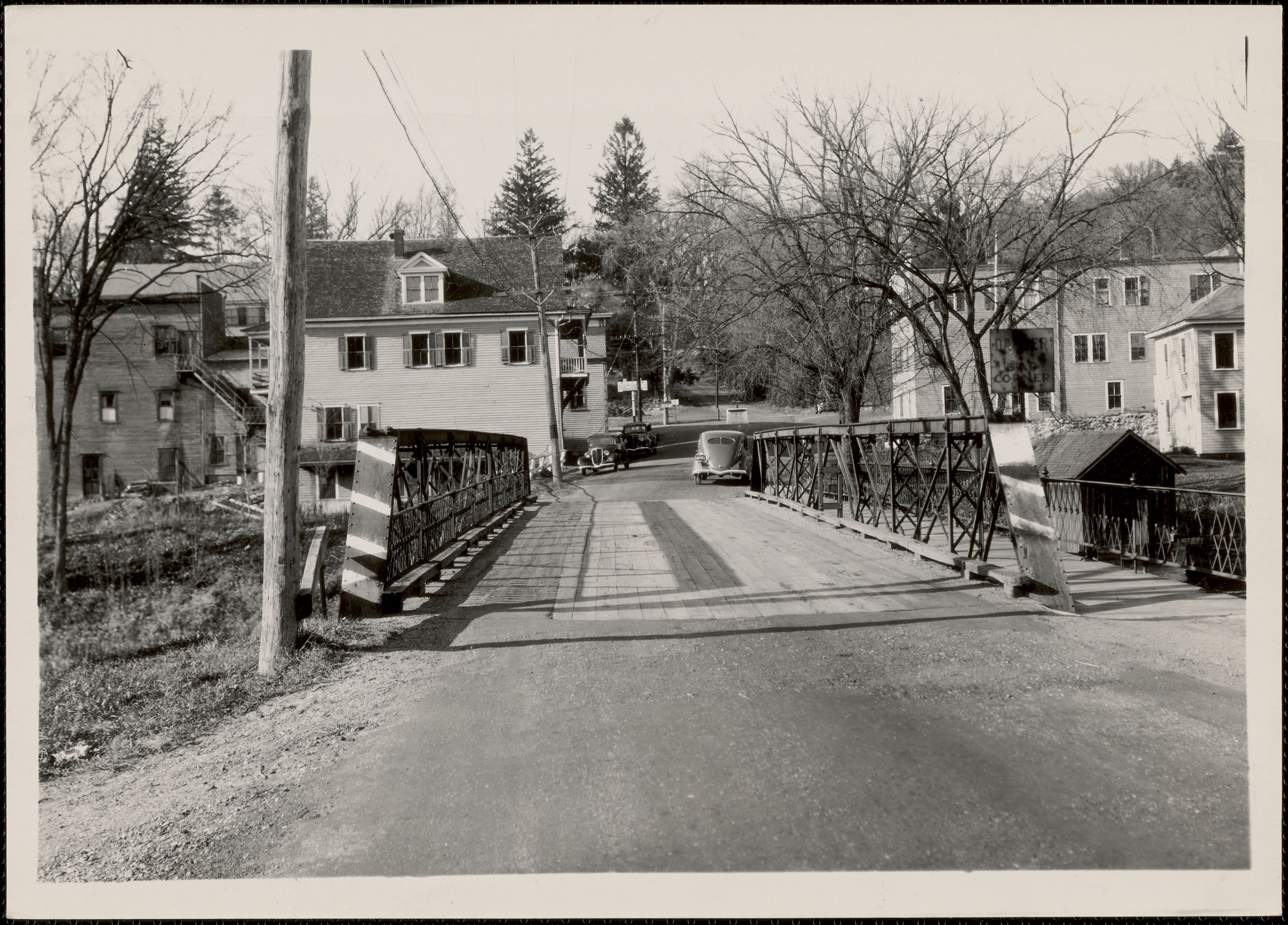
Enfield Bridge

== Other Quabbin towns that were disincorporated ==
- Dana
- Greenwich
- Prescott
