= Broad Brook Canal =

Canal in Massachusetts, United States

Coordinates: 42°12′40″N 72°24′53″W

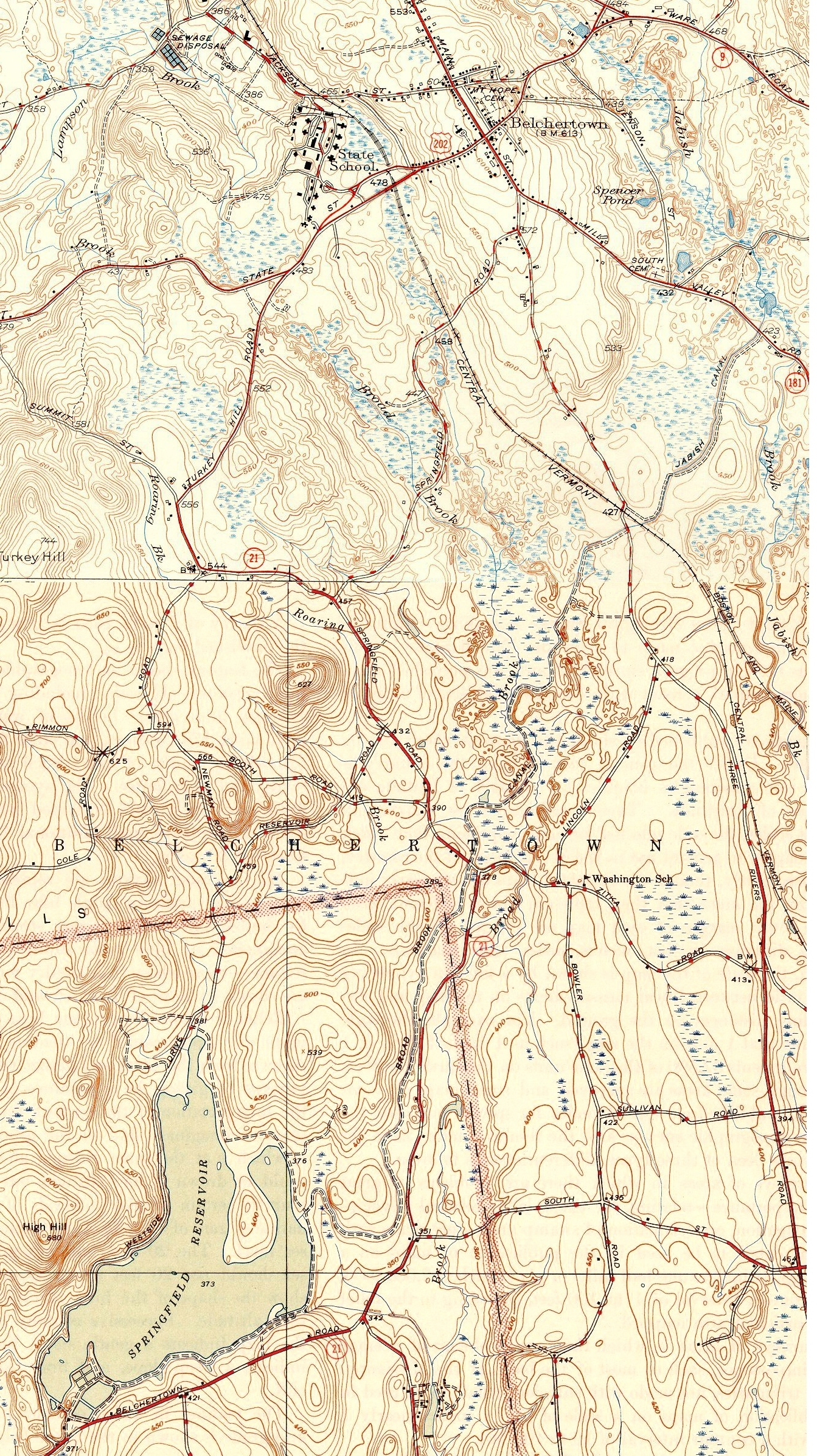
Broad Brook Canal

The Broad Brook Canal is a water-supply canal feeding the Springfield Reservoir (a.k.a. the Ludlow Reservoir) in Ludlow, Massachusetts, a public water supply for the city of Springfield, Massachusetts. Its northern segment is also known as the Jabish Canal.

The canal was first constructed circa 1875. It was 11,960 feet (3,650 m) in length, and fed the Springfield Reservoir at its eastern side with water collected in the Belchertown Reservoir and swamp. This water, however, was thought to be of poor quality, and thus in 1890–1891 the canal was extended north through the Belchertown Reservoir to Jabish Brook, east of Broad Brook. After this addition, the canal's total length was about 8 miles (13 km), of which 1,400 feet (430 m) ran through a cast-iron pipe (54 inches in diameter) across the Cherry Valley dam. The entire canal was worked to be 22 feet (6.7 m) wide at the surface, 8 feet (2.4 m) wide at the bottom, with a depth of 4.66 feet (1.42 m).
