= Charles Washburn Nichols =

American author (1883–1944)

Charles Washburn Nichols (June 20, 1883 – February 15, 1944) was a poet, writer and professor of English at the University of Minnesota.

He was born in Belchertown, Massachusetts, the son of an educator, textbook author and Amherst College graduate. He received three degrees from Yale, including a doctorate. He wrote articles about Henry Fielding as a dramatist and the editions of two of Shakespeare's plays: Macbeth (1930) and The Two Gentlemen of Verona (1931). He wrote essays and reviews as well as historical studies of the activities of his grandfather, Henry M. Nichols.

== Family ==
His grandfather, Henry M. Nichols, age 36, wife Nancy, age 35, and son Henry, age 12, drowned in Minnesota's largest lake, Bde Maka Ska, on July 5, 1860. Charles' father, Wilbur Fisk Nichols (1857-1926), orphaned at age 3, came to Springfield to be raised by an aunt. Wilbur graduated Wilbraham Academy in 1876 and Amherst College in 1880, from where he received a masters degree three years later.

Wilbur returned to Belchertown in 1912 and served as chairman of the school committee and as town treasurer. He was chairman of the school building committee that had charge of the erection of two schools in Belchertown in 1922 and 1923. He was twice chairman of the trustees of Clapp Memorial Library and had served as chairman of the board of trustees of the Congregational church.

== Yale prize ==
Charles Washburn Nichols received the Yale University Poetry Prize for his verse play, Roland and Aude.

In 1913, he read a poem he authored, Captains Three, at a dinner honoring former university presidents that was published in The Minneapolis Journal.

He married Ruby Hope Fletcher on September 1, 1909, in Minneapolis, Minnesota. They were the parents of a son and daughter.
