= Stone House Museum =

Historic home and museum complex in Massachusetts

Coordinates: 42°16′34″N 72°24′9″W

The Stone House Museum is a historic complex and home in Belchertown, Massachusetts, US, that houses the art, artifacts, carriages and archives of the Belchertown Historical Association.

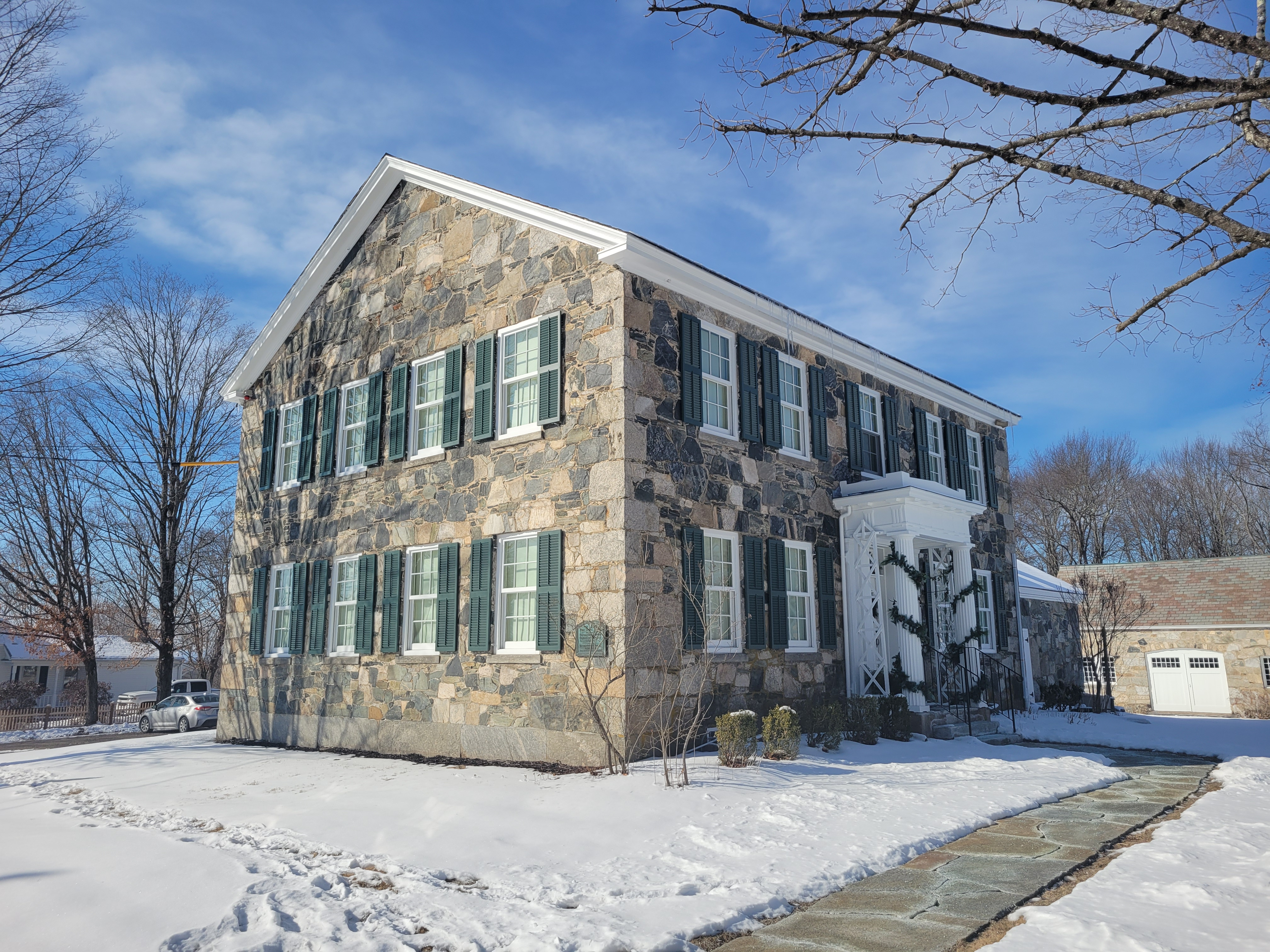
Stone House Museum, Belchertown, Massachusetts

The Museum site, a centerpiece of the Belchertown Center Historic District, includes a Federal-style home of local fieldstone, carriage house, printing press building and schoolhouse. It is located at 20 Maple Street (U.S. Route 202) near the southeastern corner of the Town Common.

It is a member of the Pioneer Valley History Network, a consortium of historical sites, museums and associations in Western Massachusetts.

The Stone House itself contains some 30,000 artifacts with examples of furniture, china, glass, plates, decorative accessories and children's toys made in the 1700s and 1800s. Its textile collection contains needlework, samplers, early crewelwork, linens, quilts and an extensive selection of period clothing. The Museum contains a collection of the finest work of sculptor John Rogers.

Its archives contain a collection of early government records, books authored by local authors, poets and professors, social and church documents, diaries, newspapers, manuscripts, ledgers, genealogical records, military records, family collections and correspondence, records of town organizations, early business establishments and a large collection of photographs.

The Belchertown Historical Association (BHA) "exists to preserve historical artifacts pertaining to the Town of Belchertown; to maintain the Stone House Museum; and to foster knowledge of and interest in the history of Belchertown by opening the Museum to the public and by offering educational programs, lectures and events."

The Museum is managed by a Board of Trustees, elected each spring at the Association's annual meeting. A non-profit organization, it is supported by memberships, event admissions, contributions and bequests.

The Association sponsors events such as history days with period reenactors, Dwight Day, ice cream socials, mystery dinners, Halloween 'n History cemetery tours, Yuletide, Victorian candlelight Christmas tours and regular guided tours of the Museum from May through October.

== History ==
The story of the Stone House Museum begins with the founding of the Belchertown Historical Association in 1903 in the living room of the home (and medical practice) of Dr. George F. Thomson (1833–1909) and his daughter Lucy Doolittle Thomson (1868–1943) on South Main Street, across the street from the Clapp Memorial Library.

The Association's first president was Nathaniel Edward Dwight (1820–1906), a member of the Dwight family and the great-grandson of Hannah Lyman (1708–1792) and Nathaniel Dwight (1712–1784), one of the earliest families to settle what was then known as Cold Spring.

The Dwights were considered so-called "river gods," a term scholars use to describe "a network of interrelated gentry families connected by birth and marriage" that "earned a deified moniker during their mortal lives because they monopolized religion, defense, law, politics, and culture in Connecticut River Valley society."

In the first years of the Historical Association, there were 39 members, according to one report. The group had begun collecting artifacts donated by the Dwights and local families that included furniture, dinnerware, portraits, clothing, and a piano, which were housed at the Library.

Around the corner from the Library and the former Thomson home is the extant unique two-story, 11-room "stone house," its exterior of multi-colored, locally-quarried fieldstone. Erected by the uncle of the Association's first president, Jonathan Dwight (1770–1834), it was a wedding gift for his daughter Julia D. Lyman (1809–1899). She lived here with her husband Theodore Dwight Lyman (1791–1845) but for a short time and moved to Philadelphia. The couple were third cousins: Lyman was a grandson of the early settlers of Cold Spring Aaron Lyman and Eunice Dwight, who was cousin of the first Nathaniel.

After the Lymans departed, Julia's paternal uncle, Nathaniel Dwight Sr. (1772–1860), acquired the property. He, his wife and seven children, including son Nathaniel E. (Association first president), lived here during the school year and then at his father's farm in the village of Dwight in the spring and summer months into the 1850s.

Family members and others, numbering more than fifty, lived in the home at one time or another across some nine decades. Dr. G. F. Thomson, the earlier mentioned Historical Association founder, was said to have been born in the house (while his father's home was under repair in 1833).

=== Harriette Dwight Longley ===
Among the last occupants of the home was Nathaniel Sr.'s granddaughter, Harriette Bartlett Dwight Longley (1853–1907). She was the only child of Harriette H. Bartlett (1819–1898) and Nathaniel E. Dwight (first Historic Association president). Known as Hattie, she married late in life to a childhood neighbor, George W. Longley, of a family of prominent Belchertown merchants. He died of heart disease, not two years after the marriage at age 39 in 1894. They had no children.

After her mother died four years later, Harriette took care of her father, who died in 1906, at age 86. In the event of his daughter's death, Nathaniel E. Dwight "so wished his money to be placed" with the Association. On the eleventh-month anniversary of his death, Harriette took her life. Planning to enter a sanitarium on August 4, 1907, she was found that day in shallow water in the Little River in Westfield and "still had on her glasses and in one hand was clenched her purse."

She bequeathed most of the estate in honor of her parents to furnish and maintain the "stone house" home as a museum. Part of the funds came from the estate of her maternal aunt, Charlotte Bartlett Dickinson (1814–1884).

The Historical Association acquired the house in 1912 and a few years later Lucy D. Thomson, an estate trustee, association founder and architect, designed its renovation. The former Dwight home opened to the public as the Stone House Museum in 1922.

Originally furnished to reflect life from the 1840s to the 1890s, it featured a large collection of antiques, china, laces, Revolutionary swords, dolls, pewter and four-poster beds.

== Carriage house ==
The carriage house, known as the Ford Annex, was a gift from Henry Ford, the automobile magnate who donated funds for its construction after visiting Belchertown and the Museum in 1923, the year following its opening.

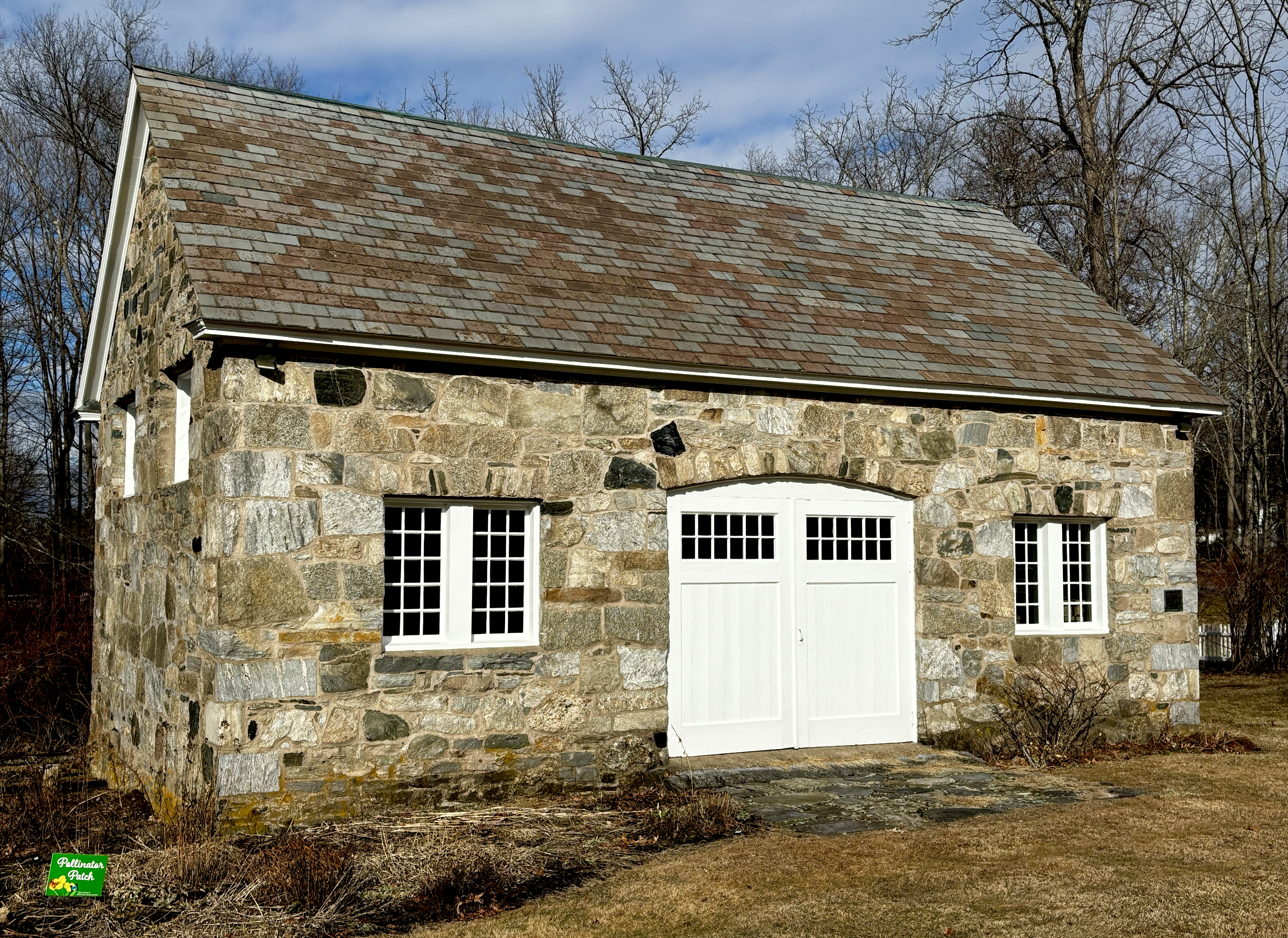
Henry Ford Annex

He came to Western Massachusetts with one of his top managers, Belchertown native Gaston Plantiff, after which the new Museum was brought to his attention. During a tour, he noted the need to preserve the carriages, wagons and sleighs that were products of the Town's once-renowned and thriving carriage trade, with attendant wheelwrights, blacksmiths, painters, upholsters, called "the Detroit of the carriage industry," and donated $5,000.

Lucy D. Thomson, the Town native and Association Trustee, drew plans for the carriage house, to be made of the same native fieldstone, preserving the integrity of the Museum and its grounds. She was among the first female graduates of an architecture school in the U.S.

The Ford Annex opened in 1924. Among its treasures are three buggies made by T. and S. D. Cowles, a Concord coach, the old Town Hearse, and a recently acquired sleigh.

== Printing press ==
The Museum complex features a historic printing press in the Blackmer Building, so named for Lewis H. Blackmer (1885–1966), owner, publisher and editor of The Belchertown Sentinel weekly newspaper, from its premier issue in 1915 for half a century. He retired in 1965, about a year before his death. The newspaper continues today.

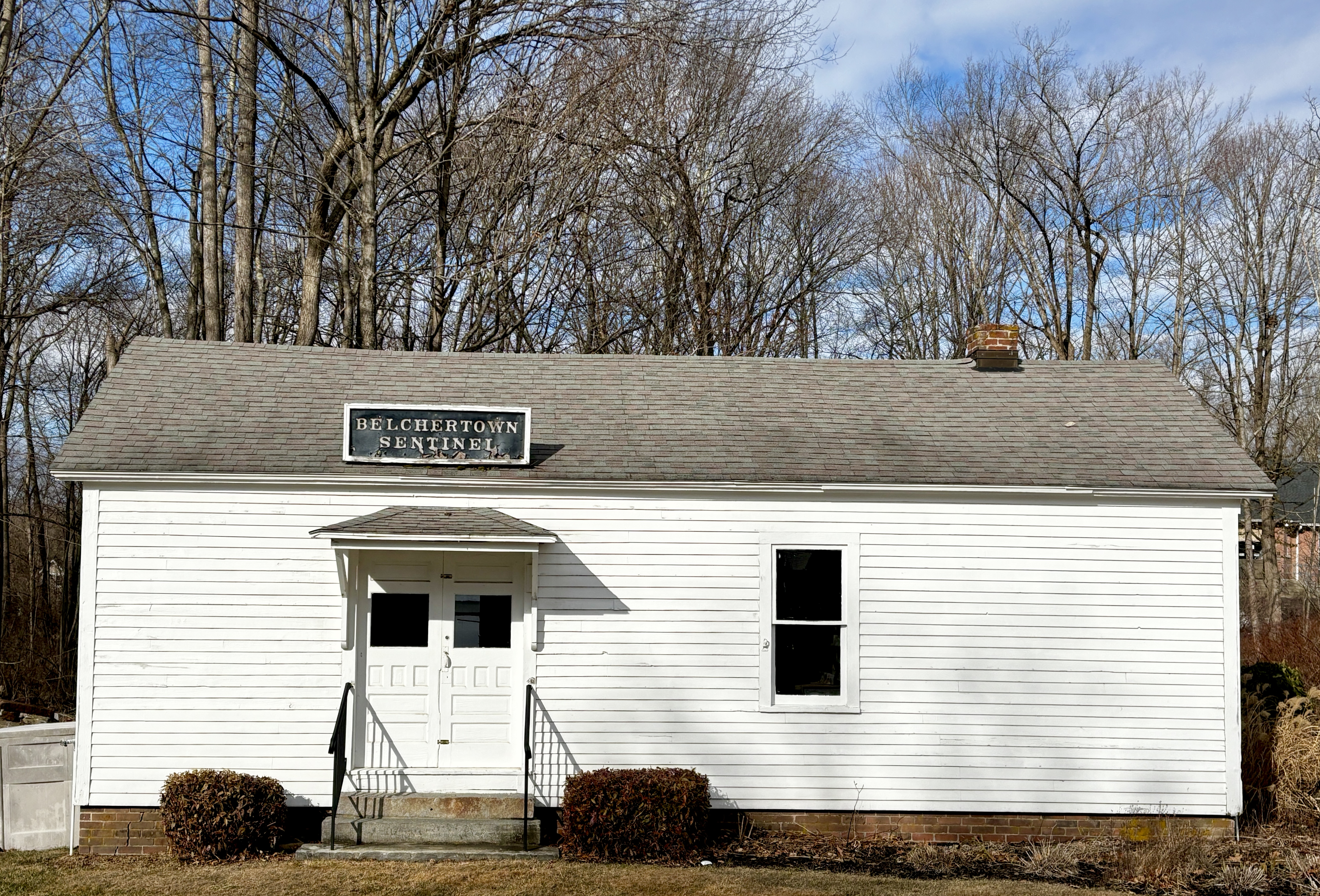
Blackmer Building & Printing Press

Blackmer was the great-great-grandson of Barnabas Blackmer, of Warren, who settled with Elizabeth Shaw near today's Munsell Street in North Belchertown by 1765. Lewis worked in his father's Belchertown wrapping-paper store and later began a printing business.

The Blackmer Building, his printing office and the original press, was purchased in 1968 at auction by Peter Dearness, the Sentinel's assistant editor, who donated them to the BHA.

Historical issues of the newspaper may be found at the online archives hosted by the Museum, the Clapp Memorial Library and at UMass-Amherst Special Collections.

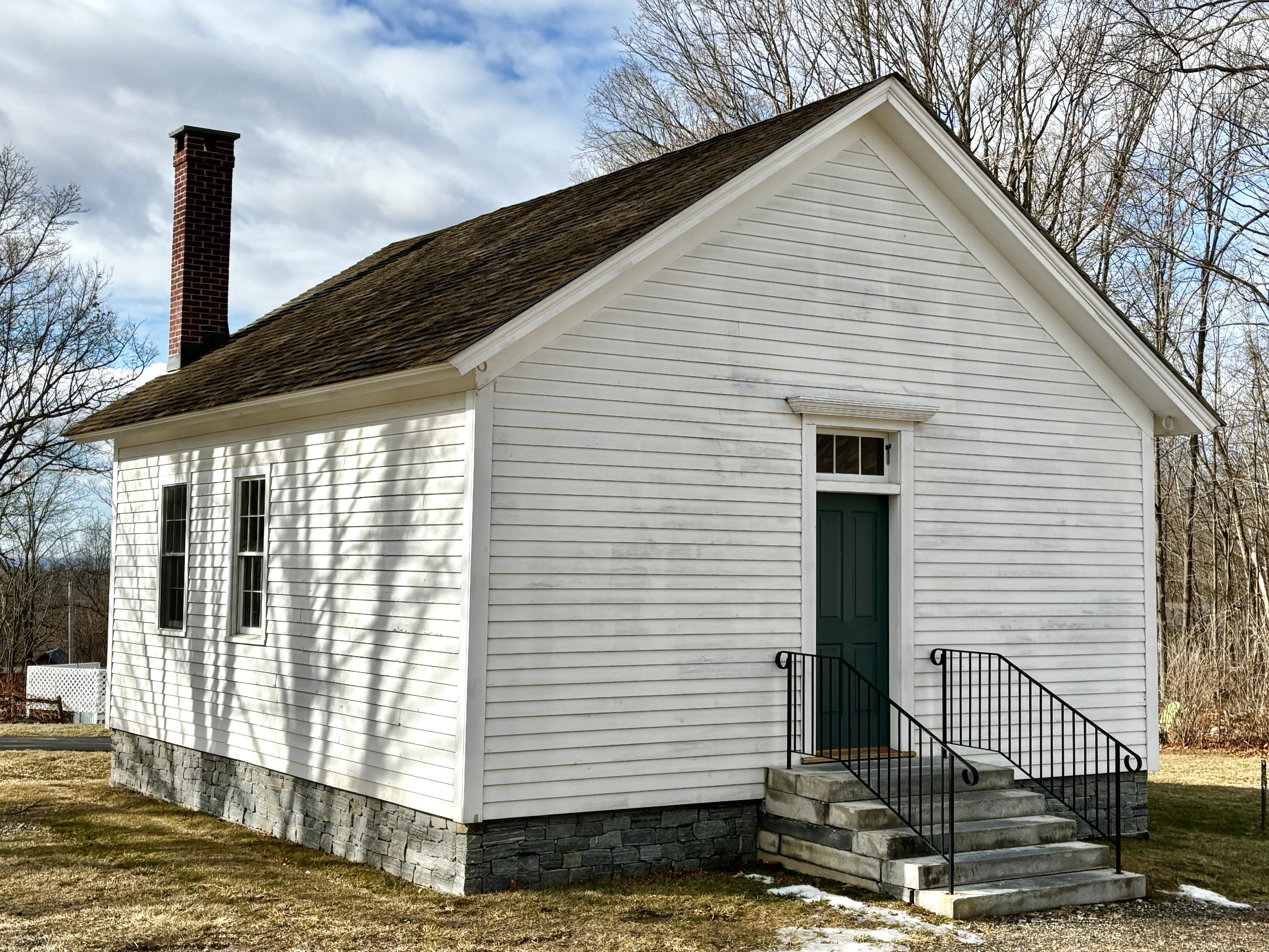
Washington District Schoolhouse

== Schoolhouse ==
The Museum grounds contain the historic, one-room Washington District Schoolhouse, the last of what were at one time 18 separate District structures across Town in the nineteenth century.

It was erected in 1880 and used until about 1930. Acquired by BHA and moved to the site in 2016, it is the subject of a $150,000 restoration campaign, to be used for education programs, lectures and tours. Ongoing work includes new foundations, chimneys and interior, aiming to recreate its original look with desks, blackboards and period items.

== Resources ==
The Stone House Museum Website

The Belchertown Sentinel at the Museum

The Belchertown Sentinel at UMass Special Collections

The Pioneer Valley History Network
