= List of inscriptions in the Minnesota State Capitol =

Chief Decorator Elmer Garnsey, as a part of the mural decoration, worked with Capitol Architect Cass Gilbert to create a list of quotes to be used in the Minnesota State Capitol. The list was submitted to the commission for examination and revision. Originally there were in all 51 inscriptions in different places about the building, from 39 different men.

== Inscriptions in Staircase Hall, Second Floor, Senate Side ==
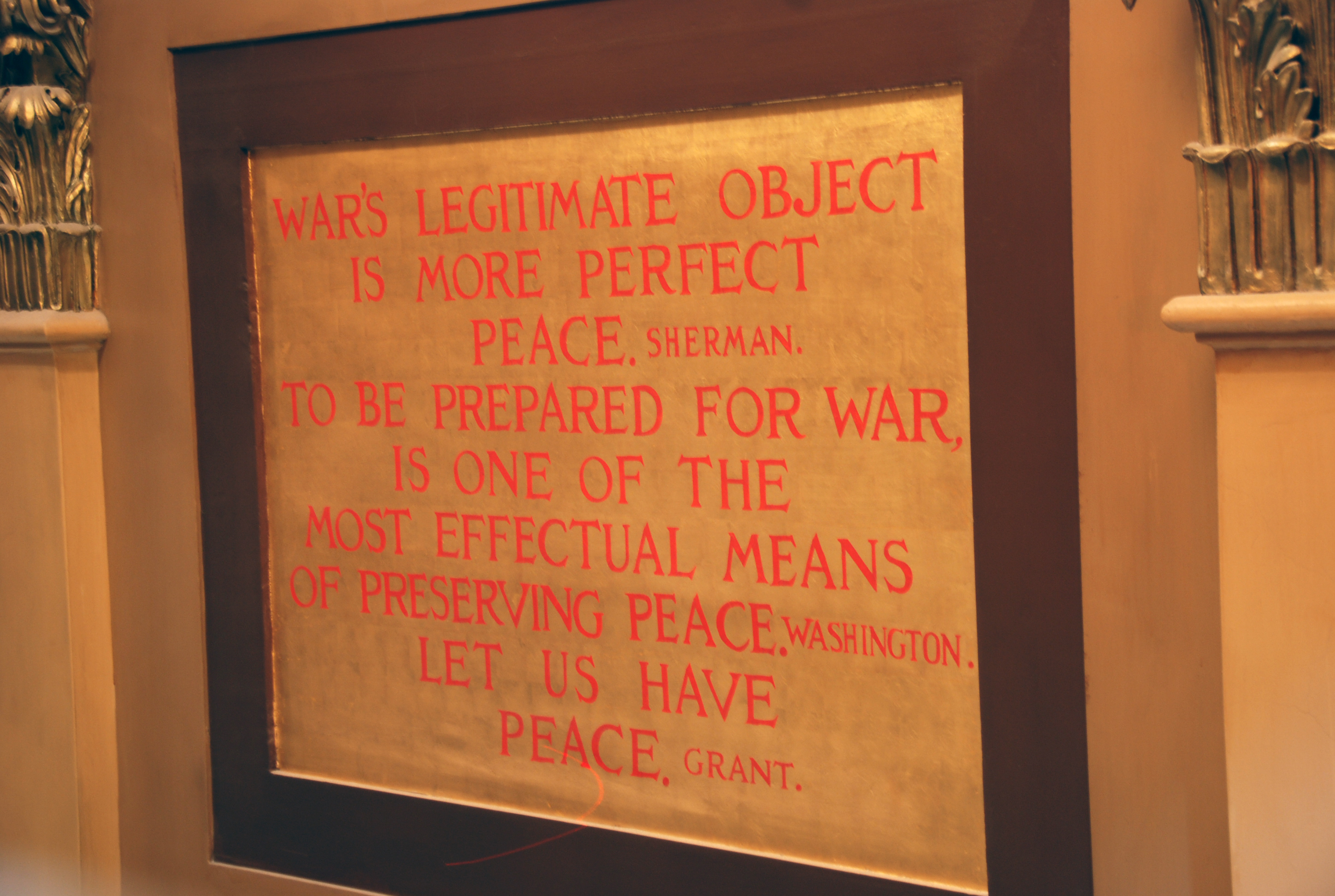
Quotes on War

- The true grandeur of nations is in those equalities which constitute the true greatness of the individual. ~Charles Sumner
- Labor to keep alive in your heart that little spark of celestial fire called Conscience. ~President George Washington
- The proper function of a government is to make it easy for the people to do good, and difficult for them to do evil. ~William Ewart Gladstone
- No government is respectable which is not just. ~Daniel Webster
- The liberty of a people consists in being governed by laws which they have made themselves. ~Abraham Cowley
- Education is a better safeguard of liberty than a standing army.~Edward Everett
- Eternal vigilance is the price of liberty. ~President Thomas Jefferson
- True liberty consists in the privilege of enjoying our own rights; not in the destruction of the rights of others. ~Charles C. Pinckney
- If we mean to support the liberty and independence which have cost us so much blood and treasure to establish, we must drive far away the demon of party spirit and local reproach. ~President George Washington
- Equal and exact justice to all men, of whatever state or persuasion, religious or political; peace, commerce and honest friendship with all nations, entangling alliances with none. ~President Thomas Jefferson
- Next in importance to freedom and justice is popular education, without which neither justice nor freedom can be permanently maintained. ~President James Garfield
- Education is our only political safety. ~Horace Mann
- Let us ever remember that our interest is in concord, not conflict, and that our real eminence rests in the victories of peace, not those of war. ~President William McKinley
- Nothing is politically right which is morally wrong. ~Daniel O'Connell
- Eternal good citizenship is the price of good government. ~Elihu Root
- Votes should be weighed, not counted. ~Friedrich Schiller
- War's legitimate object is more perfect peace. ~Gen. William T. Sherman
- To be prepared for war is one of the most effectual means of preserving peace. ~President George Washington.
- Let us have peace. ~Gen. Ulysses S. Grant

== Inscriptions in Staircase Hall, Second Floor, Supreme Court Side ==
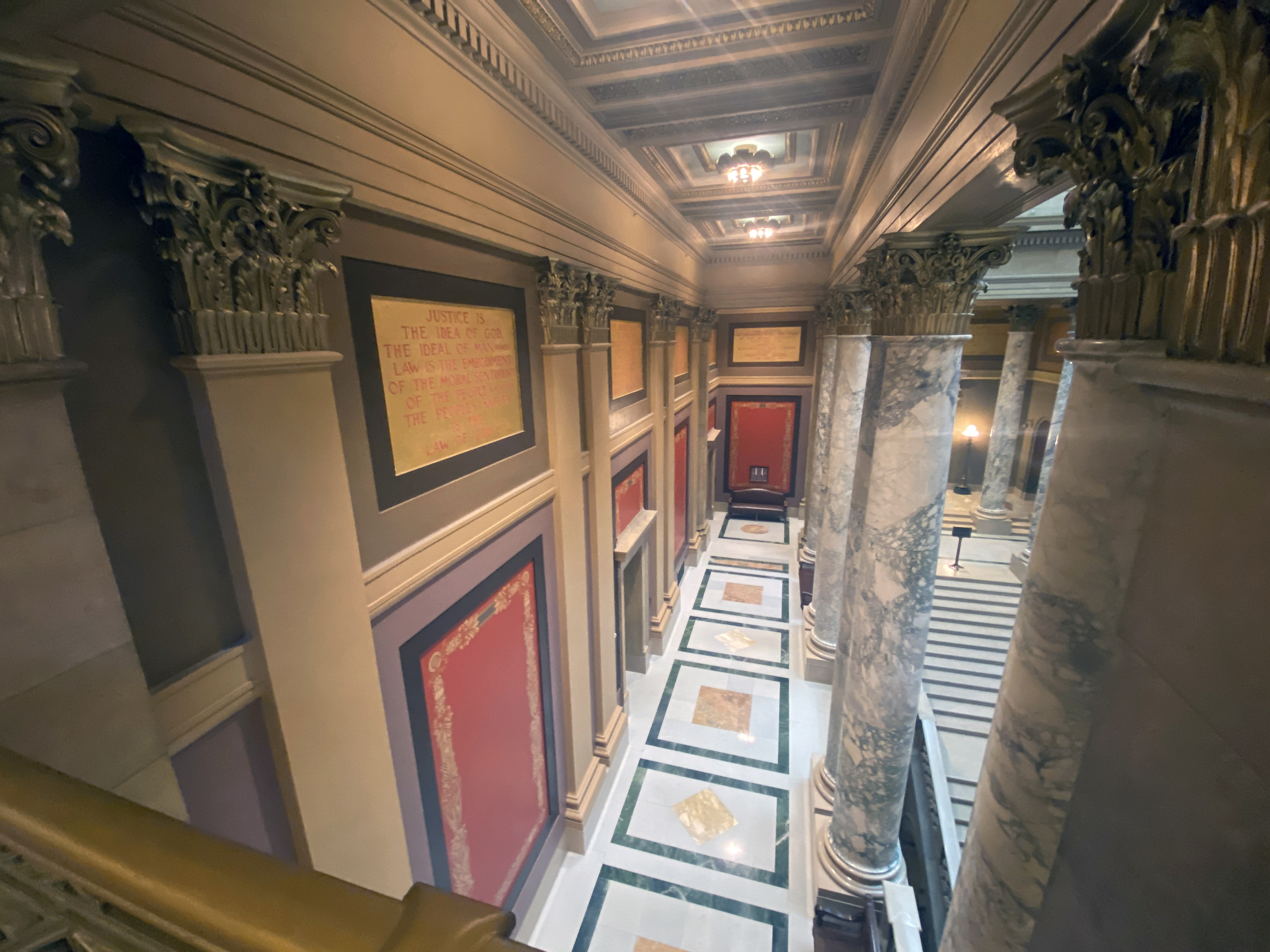

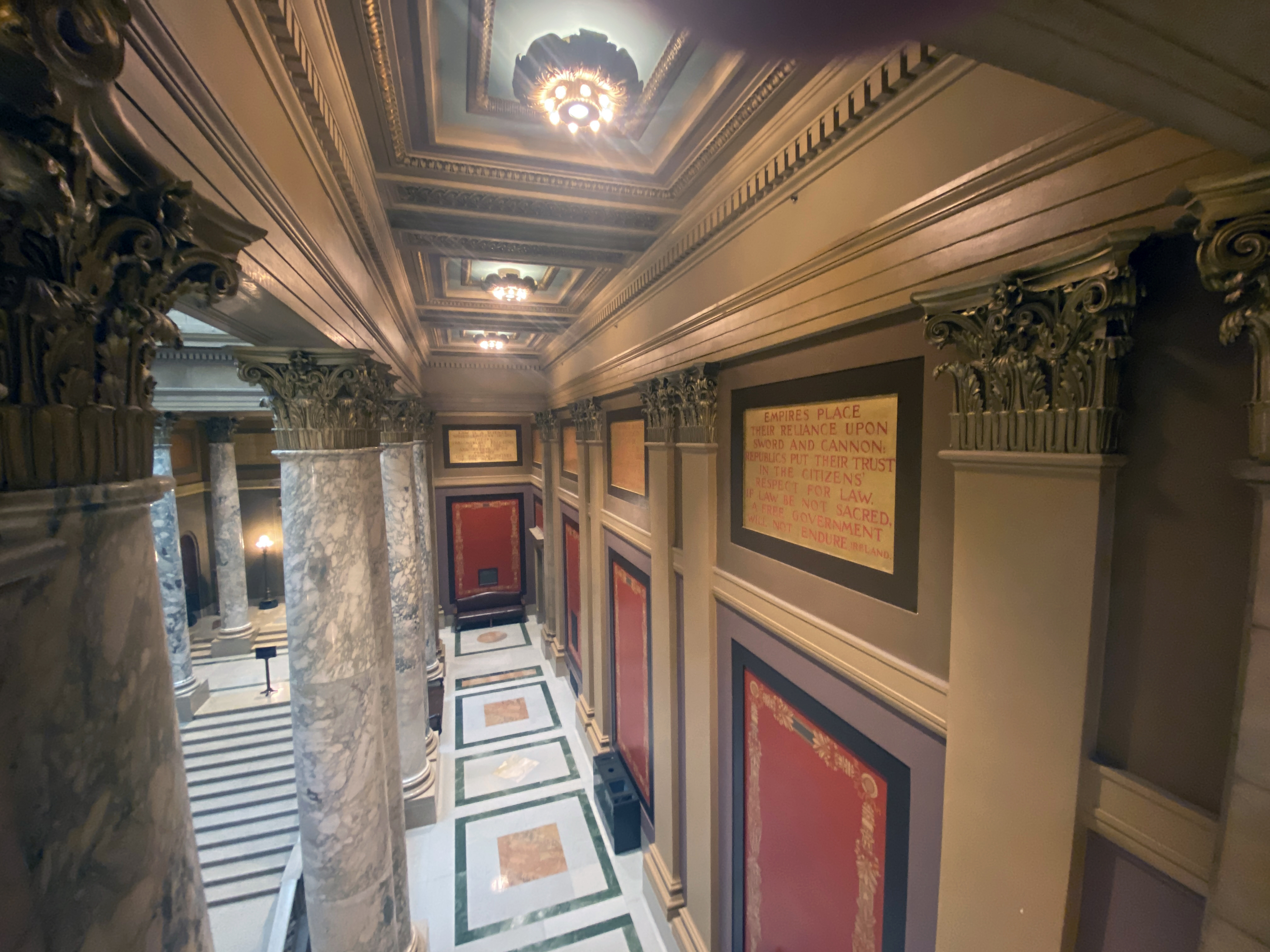

- Justice is the idea of God, the ideal of man. ~Theodore Parker
- Law is the embodiment of the moral sentiment of the people. ~William Blackstone
- The people's safety is the law of God. ~James Otis Jr.
- The absolute justice of the state, enlightened by the perfect reason of the state, that is law. ~Rufus Choate
- God's laws make it easier to do right, and harder to do wrong. ~William Ewart Gladstone
- Laws are the very bulwarks of liberty; they define every man's rights, and defend the individual liberties of all men. ~Josiah Gilbert Holland
- The science of jurisprudence, the pride of the human intellect, with all its defects, redundancies and errors, is the collected reason of ages. ~Edmund Burke
- Of law there can be no less acknowledged than that her seat is the bosom of God, her voice the harmony of the world. ~Richard Hooker
- Ignorance of the law excuses no man. ~John Selden
- The best way to get a bad law repealed is to enforce it strictly. ~Abraham Lincoln
- First make him obey the law, then remove the cause that in cites him to law-breaking. ~Wilson
- Law is a science which employs in its theory the noblest faculties of the soul, and exerts in its practice the cardinal virtues of the heart. ~William Blackstone
- Justice is the constant desire and effort to render to every man his due. ~Justinian
- Impartiality is the life of justice, as justice is of all good government. ~Justinian
- Reason is the life of law, nay, the common law itself is nothing else but reason. ~Edward Coke
- The law is made to protect the innocent by punishing the guilty. ~Daniel Webster
- To embarrass justice by a multiplicity of laws, or to hazard it by confidence in judges, are the opposite rocks on which all civil institutions have been wrecked. ~Samuel Johnson
- Empires place their reliance upon sword and cannon; republics put their trust in the citizens' respect for law. If law be not sacred, a free government will not endure. ~Archbishop John Ireland

== South Lunette, Opposite Dome, Third Floor ==
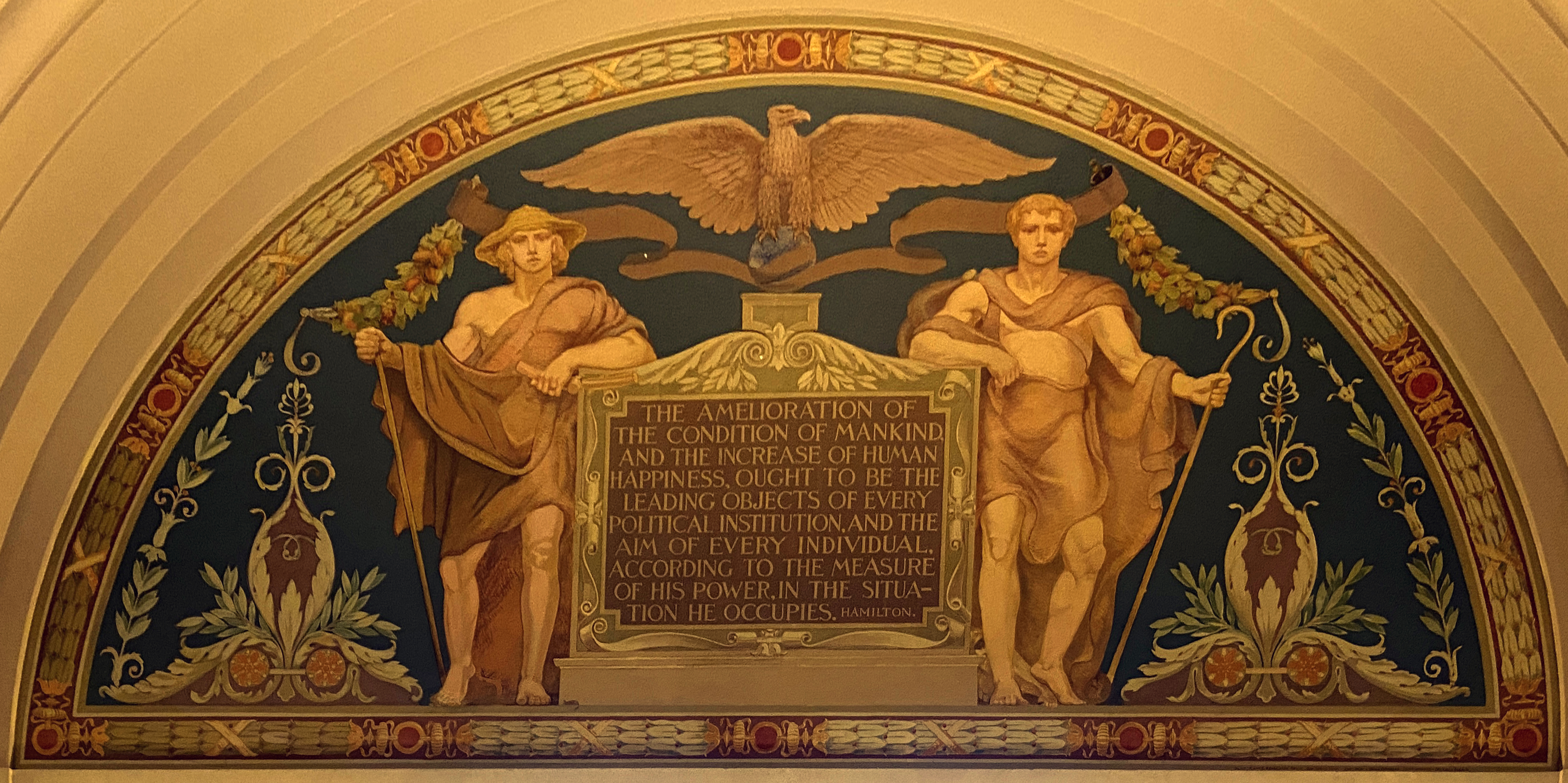
Hamilton quote

The amelioration of the condition of mankind, and the increase of human happiness, ought to be the leading objects of every political institution, and the aim of every individual, according to the measure of his power, in the situation he occupies. ~Alexander Hamilton.

== North Lunette, Opposite Dome, Third Floor ==
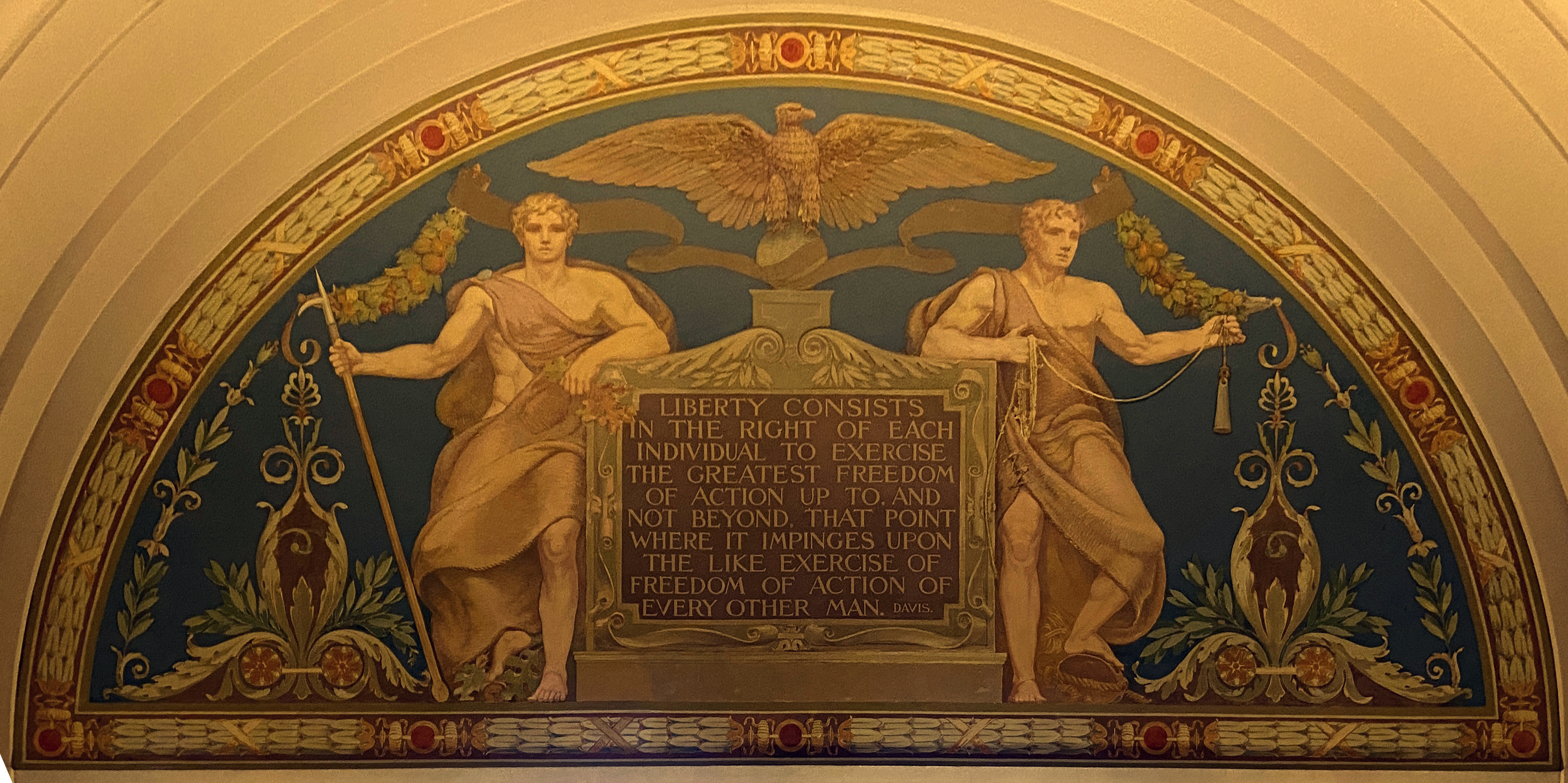
Davis quote

Liberty consists in the right of each individual to exercise the greatest freedom of action up to, and not beyond that point where it impinges upon the like exercise of freedom of action of every other man. ~Cushman K. Davis

== Above Entrance to Supreme Court, Second Floor ==
Justice is the great interest of man on earth. It is the ligament which holds civilized nations together. Wherever her temple stands so long as it is duly honored there is a foundation for social security, general happiness, and the improvement and progress of our race. ~Daniel Webster

== Senate Chamber ==
Let us develop the resources of our land, call forth its powers, build up its institutions, promote all its great interests, and see whether we also, in our day and generation, may not perform something worthy to be remembered. ~Daniel Webster

== House Chamber ==
We hold these truths to be self-evident, that all men are created equal. That they are endowed by their Creator with certain inalienable rights. That among them are life, liberty, and the pursuit of happiness. ~Thomas Jefferson.

No free government or the blessings of liberty can be preserved to any people but by a firm adherence to justice, moderation, temperance, frugality and virtue, and by a frequent recurrence to fundamental principles. ~Patrick Henry.

Inscriptions added later in 1930s

The Trail of the Pioneer bore the Footprints of Liberty.

Vox Populorum Est Vox Dei. (Latin, 'the voice of the people is the voice of God')

== Others ==
Aside from the above inscriptions painted on the walls, the following have been cut into the wood or marble, in their respective places:

=== Over Fireplace, in House Retiring Room ===
Free and fair discussion will ever be found the firmest friend of truth. ~George Campbell.

=== On Fireplace, in House Retiring Room ===
Measure not dispatch by the times of sitting, but by the advancement of business. ~Francis Bacon.

=== Inside Main Entrance to House ===
Reason is the life of law. ~Edward Coke.

=== Inside Senate, Over Door Casing ===
The noblest motive is the public good. ~Virgil.

=== Inside Supreme Court, Over Door Casing ===
Where law ends tyranny begins. ~John Locke.
