= Samuel Bowles =

Samuel Bowles may refer to:

- Samuel Bowles (journalist) (1826–1878), American journalist
- Samuel Bowles (economist) (born 1939), American economist
