= Fairview Hospital =

Fairview Hospital may refer to:

- M Health Fairview, a network of hospitals and clinics in Minnesota, including the University of Minnesota Medical Center
- Fairview Hospital (Cleveland), a part of the Cleveland Clinic in Cleveland, Ohio
- Fairview Hospital (Massachusetts), in Great Barrington, Massachusetts, part of Berkshire Health Systems
- Fairview Training Center, previously known as the Fairview Hospital and Training Center in Salem, Oregon
