= Hopkins Academy =

Coordinates: 42°20′30.32″N 72°35′28.32″W

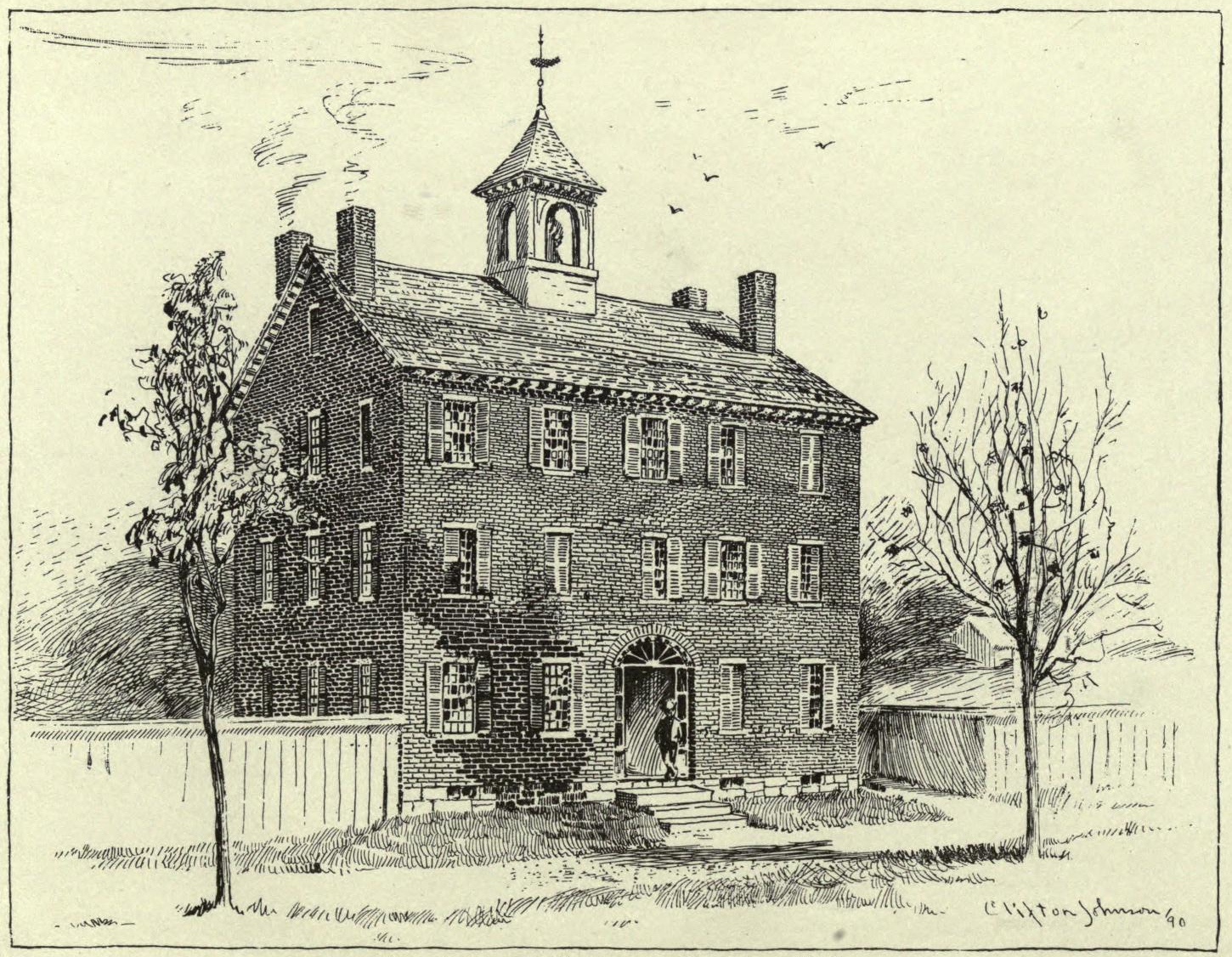
- Old Academy building, built in 1817

Location
- 131 Russell Street; Hadley, Massachusetts 01035; United States

Information
- Type: Public; High school Open enrollment
- Established: 1664
- Principal: April A. Camuso
- Enrollment: 250
- Colors: Gold and white
- Mascot: Golden Hawks
- Website: hadleyschools.org/hopkins-academy

Hopkins Academy is the public middle (7th and 8th grade) and senior (9th–12th grade) high school for the town of Hadley, Massachusetts, United States.

== Founding ==
The school was founded in 1664 with an endowment from Edward Hopkins, an English colonist who was Governor of the Connecticut Colony and a wealthy Connecticut merchant. Hopkins died in 1657 and in his will he set up a trust naming John Davenport, Theophilus Eaton, John Cullick and William Goodwin as trustees. Goodwin, who helped to settle Hadley, used part of Hopkins' trust to set up a fund for the then Hopkins Donation School. Three hundred pounds were to be disposed of from Mr. Hopkins' estate and ordered to Hadley for erecting and maintaining a school there. The management thereof for the said school was appointed for year end viz; the Rev Jonathan Russell, Mr. Samuel Smith, Mr. Peter Tilton and Capt Aaron Cooke and finding in the records at Springfield, September 24, 1674. The Hadley townspeople donated land to help build up the trust to pay for educational costs. The Hopkins Trust is the oldest charitable fund to be in continuous use in the United States. Edward Hopkins played a pivotal role in establishing and operating other prominent institutions within the United States, including Harvard University.

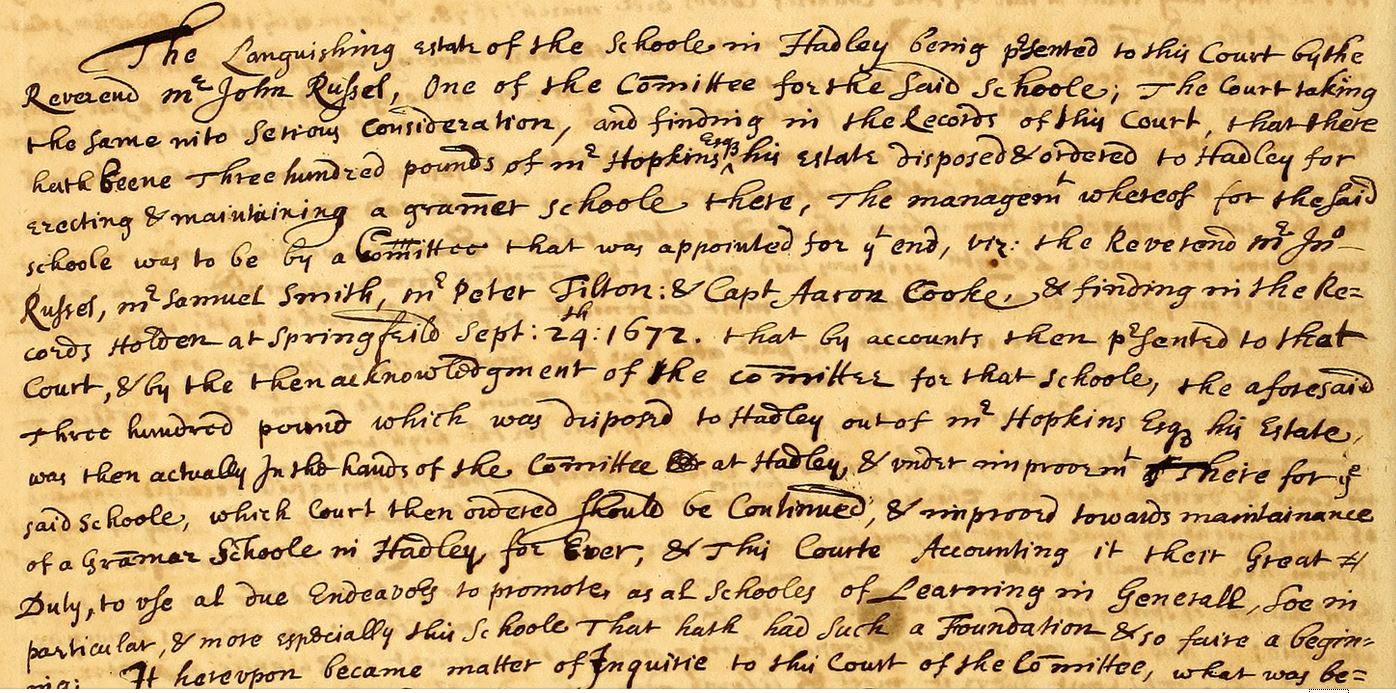
Original document of the founding of Hopkins School

The academy incorporated in 1816. For many years, Hopkins Academy was a private school, however, it has been the only public high school in Hadley for many decades. It is also the fourth oldest public high school in the United States that is still in operation.

== Academics ==
Since the inception of the Massachusetts Comprehensive Assessment System (MCAS), Hopkins Academy has consistently scored among the top schools in Massachusetts. In 2008, The Boston Globe ranked Hopkins' 10th graders (under the title "Hadley Public Schools") 2nd in mathematics and tied for 33rd in ELA in the state of Massachusetts. The school maintains a particular strength in mathematics, despite not having a specialized math program or an accelerated student population (such as the Massachusetts Academy of Math and Science at WPI). In fact, Hopkins' 10th graders have scored near-perfect MCAS composite performance index (CPI) ratings for math in the past (99.4 in 2007).

This success is generally attributed to small learning communities which yield a low student to teacher ratio. Many of Hopkins' graduates pursue 4-year degrees at prominent universities throughout the United States.

In January 2010, U.S. News & World Report gave Hopkins a Bronze Medal on its list of the Top High Schools in America. Thirty-seven Massachusetts high schools made the list, but Hopkins was one of only two (along with Greenfield High School) located geographically west of Worcester.

Despite above average MCAS scores, the school did not meet state mandated targets for equal education. The school met targets for the "White" and "Low Income" demographics, but failed to achieve the target in other areas.

== Athletics and extracurricular activities ==
The school offers many sports, such as baseball, basketball, booster club, cheerleading, cross country, golf, softball and equestrian teams; all of which compete in the MIAA Division IV Hampshire League. Hopkins' athletic rival is Smith Academy in nearby Hatfield, Massachusetts. Hopkins also has a music program comprising a marching band, pep band, and jazz band. There are also many clubs at Hopkins Academy, including Diversity Club, Drama Club, Game Club, and Ski Club.

== Notable alumni ==
- Harriette Merrick Plunkett, president, House of Mercy
