= Our New West =

Book by Samuel Bowles

Our New West. Records of Travel between the Mississippi River and the Pacific Ocean is a book by Samuel Bowles (1826-1878). It was published in Hartford, Connecticut by The Hartford Publishing Company; and in New York by J.D. Dennison in 1869, 524 pages including plates, with a map in front.

== Summary ==
Bowles, the editor of the Springfield Republican, was one of a party that traveled across the North American continent in the summers of 1865 and 1866 to explore the Western United States. Several books resulted from the trips. The detailed subtitle of Bowles's book shows clearly how at the time interests in natural and man-made wonders and in exploitable resources were combined. Bowles sees the railroads as the key that will unlock the region. In addition to his enthusiasm for the West, Bowles urges the preservation of Niagara Falls (probably influenced by Frederick Law Olmsted, whom he met in Yosemite Valley) and of regions of the Adirondacks and Maine (see pp. 384–85).
