= There's a Song in the Air =

Christmas carol

- by Josiah G. Holland
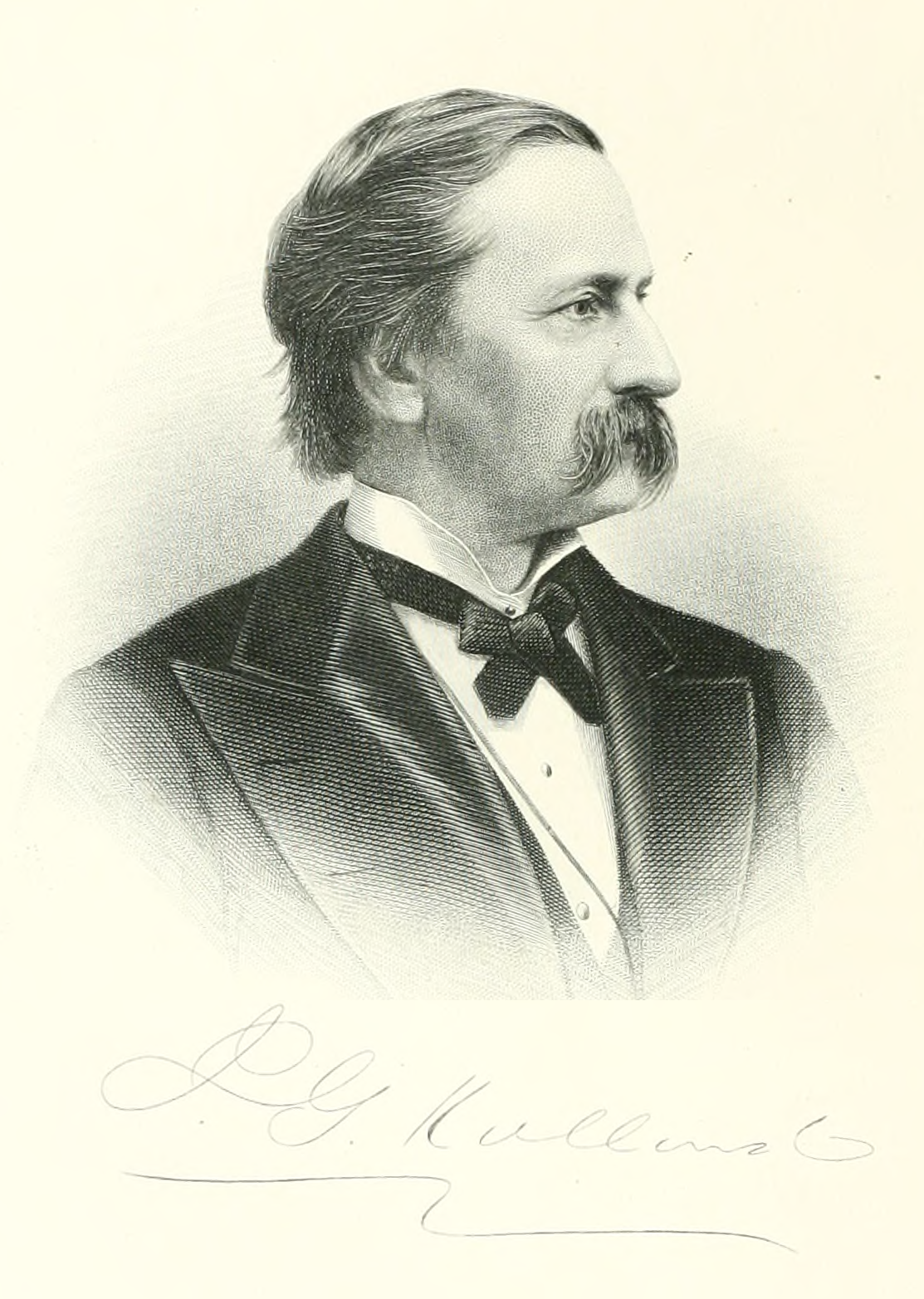
- Genre: Christmas carol
- Written: 1872
- Based on: Luke 2:7
- Meter: 6.6.6.6.12.12
- Melody: "Christmas Song" by Karl P. Harrington

"There's a Song in the Air" is a Christmas carol and United Methodist Church hymn.

== History ==
In the summer of 1904, Karl P. Harrington was assembling the new Methodist Hymnal. He went through hundreds of familiar hymns from a range of hymnals and songbooks. It was his job to comb through the offerings and select the songs that would line the pews. As Ace Collins says in Stories Behind the Best-Loved Songs of Christmas: "That meant he had to include music that could be sung by huge church choirs in places like Boston and by tiny congregations in places like Salem, Arkansas. Every pastor and song leader would be depending upon the songs included; other than the Bible itself, his project would be the most important tool found in most churches." He was up to the task. He was a skilled organist. He had studied music around the globe, written numerous hymns, and was a Wesleyan University music professor. Despite his gifts, it was still a daunting task. To relax, he would read the poetry of American poet and novelist Josiah Holland. Hollanad was the founder of Scribner''s Magazine. He wrote the poem for an 1874 Sunday school journal and it was reprinted that year in Complete Poetry Writings. This was the book that Harrington was flipping through in the midst of editing the new hymnal. He came across this Christmas poem and decided it should be set to music. Collins says, "Going over to the organ, Harrington again studied the words to 'There's a Song in the Air'. This time he read them aloud, forming a tune around each phrase. As his fingers touched the keyboard, a melody came to life." In 1905, in The Methodist Hymnal the words and music become one and were sent to churches around the globe.

== Lyrics ==
There's a song in the air! There's a star in the sky!
There's a mother's deep prayer and a baby's low cry!
And the star rains its fire while the beautiful sing,
For the manger of Bethlehem cradles a King!

There's a tumult of joy o'er the wonderful birth,
For the virgin's sweet Boy is the Lord of the earth.
Ay! the star rains its fire while the beautiful sing,
For the manger of Bethlehem cradles a King!

In the light of that star lie the ages impearled;
And that song from afar has swept over the world.
Every hearth is aflame, and the beautiful sing
In the homes of the nations that Jesus is King!

We rejoice in the light, and we echo the song
That comes down through the night from the heavenly throng.
Ay! we shout to the lovely evangel they bring,
And we greet in His cradle our Savior and King!
