= Berkshire Medical Center =

Hospital in Massachusetts

Coordinates: 42.4595°N 73.2492°W

- Berkshire Health Systems

Geography
- Location: Pittsfield, Berkshire County, Massachusetts, US

Organisation
- Care system: Private
- Type: Community/Teaching
- Affiliated university: University of Massachusetts Medical School

Services
- Standards: American College of Surgeons; The Joint Commission
- Emergency department: III
- Beds: 302

History
- Founded: 1875

Links
- Website: www.berkshirehealthsystems.org/location/berkshire-medical-center/

Berkshire Medical Center is a mid-sized non-profit community hospital located in Pittsfield, Massachusetts. The hospital is part of Berkshire Health Systems, a three-hospital healthcare system operating in Western Massachusetts. In 2022, the hospital reported 198 staffed beds, almost 12,000 discharges, and over 15,000 emergency department visits.

== History ==
The hospital's history goes back to the original House of Mercy, which opened in Pittsfield in 1875. Harriette Merrick Plunkett served as its president.

In 1949, the House of Mercy was renamed Pittsfield General Hospital, and moved into a new seven-level, 245-bed location in 1962. It merged with St. Luke's Hospital in 1968, becoming the Berkshire Medical Center. It merged with Hillcrest Hospital in 1996. It acquired the former North Adams Regional Hospital property from Bankruptcy Court on August 29, 2014.

== Certifications ==
Berkshire is certified by the American College of Surgeons as a Level III trauma center and by The Joint Commission.

== See also ==
- Fairview Hospital (Massachusetts)
