= North Adams Regional Hospital =

Hospital in Massachusetts, US

- North Berkshire Healthcare
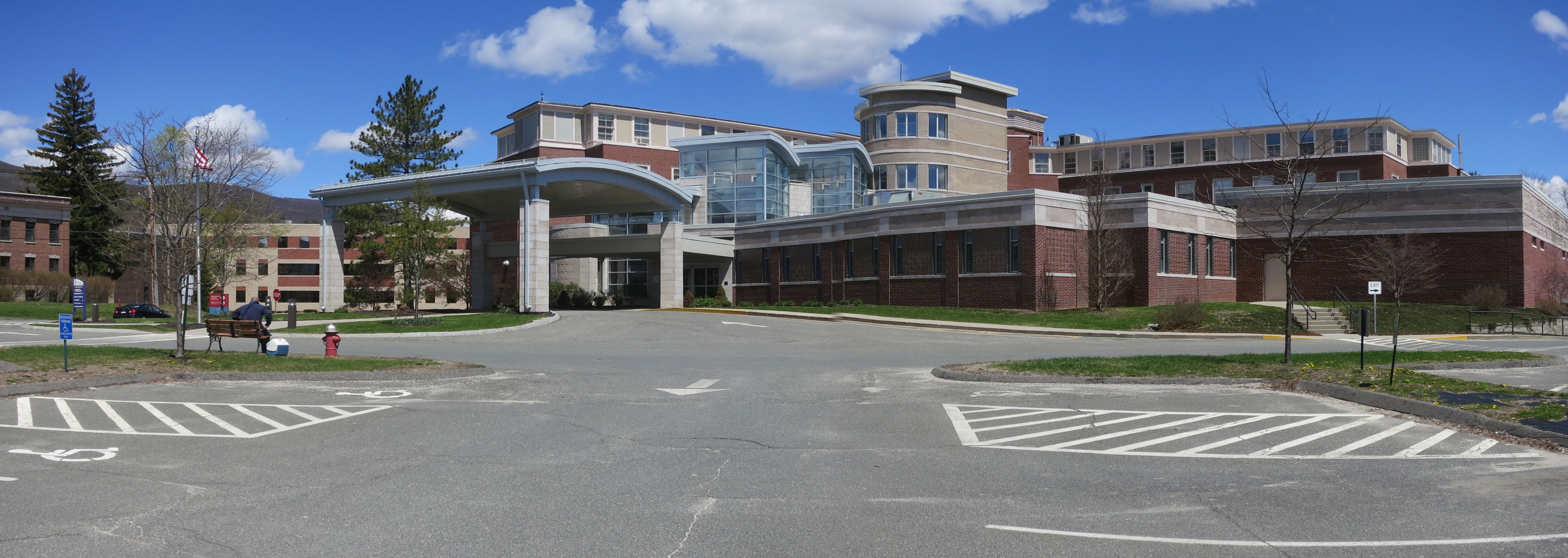
- North Adams Regional Hospital

Geography
- Location: North Adams, Massachusetts, United States
- Coordinates: 42.707497°N 73.109495°W

Organization
- Network: Berkshire Health Systems

Helipads
- Helipad: FAA LID: 32MA
Number	Length		Surface
Number	ft	m	Surface
H1	100	30	Concrete

History
- Opened: March 2, 1884; Reopened: March 28, 2024
- Closed: March 28, 2014

Links
- Website: www.berkshirehealthsystems.org/location/north-adams-regional-hospital/
- Lists: Hospitals in Massachusetts

North Adams Regional Hospital is a full-service community hospital in North Adams, Massachusetts. It serves the Northern Berkshire communities of Adams, Cheshire, Clarksburg, Florida, Lanesborough, North Adams, Savoy, Williamstown and communities in southern Vermont and in eastern New York state. The hospital is part of Northern Berkshire Healthcare (NBH), a not-for-profit organization. NBH originally closed it on March 28, 2014. Ten years to the day of its closing, on March 28, 2024, it reopened as a hospital after serving as a 24-hour emergency hospital and de facto urgent care facility.

The facility was re-opened as a part of Berkshire Health Systems under the name: Berkshire Health North, the facility includes 24 hour Emergency Care, Primary and Specialty Care, Labs and Imaging as well as Community Health programs.

== History ==
The hospital opened March 2, 1884 and the original building was expanded over time. A completely new hospital building on the same campus opened in 1955.

In the 1980s, the North Adams Hospital (now known as the North Adams Regional Hospital or NARH) was quite full. However, better medications and treatments for chronic illnesses such as heart disease, diabetes and asthma reduced the need for inpatient hospitalizations and many surgical procedures which had once occurred in the inpatient setting shifted to outpatient facilities.

Beset by chronically low inpatient censuses in recent years, declining reimbursement from Medicaid and Medicare, and facing rising costs, many rural hospitals, not just NARH, struggled to stay alive. Some turned to larger health systems for financial backing, partnership, or mergers.

NARH went through Chapter 11 bankruptcy reorganization in 2011 and built an affiliation with Berkshire Medical Center (BMC) in Pittsfield, MA. They did not merge however, due to NARH's bond debt and existing union contracts. After closing its doors in March 2014, NARH declared Chapter 7 bankruptcy on April 3, 2014, at which point BMC committed to purchase the facility through the bankruptcy process. During the interim BMC re-established emergency medical care and other medical services in northern Berkshire County.

BMC paid a total $3.4 million for the hospital campus and NBH's fixed assets, and $600,000 for the Northern Berkshire Family Practice. The purchase was finalized in bankruptcy court on August 29, 2014.

BHS announced a plan to reopen North Adams Regional Hospital in 2024, a decade after the sudden closure in 2014.
