= Harriette Merrick Plunkett =

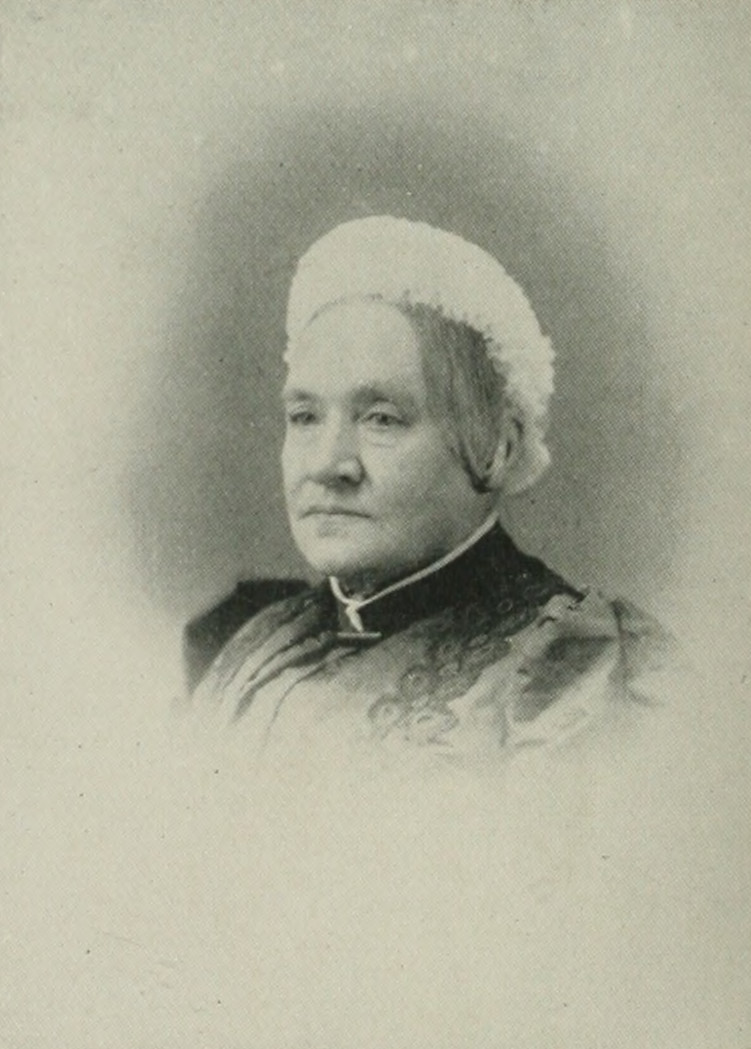
- Portrait photo from A Woman of the Century
- Born: Harriette Merrick Hodge; February 6, 1826; Hadley, Massachusetts, U.S.
- Died: December 26, 1906 (aged 80); Pittsfield, Massachusetts, U.S.
- Other name: Mrs. H. M. Plunkett
- Education: Hopkins Academy
- Occupations: President, House of Mercy
- Notable work: Women, Plumbers, and Doctors
- Spouse: Thomas Fitzpatrick Plunkett (m. 1847; died 1875)
- Relatives: Samuel Hopkins; Jonathan Edwards

Harriette Merrick Plunkett (née, Hodge; pen name, Mrs. H. M. Plunkett; 1826–1906) was a pioneer in the work of sanitary reform in the United States and a leader among women in literary and benevolent work. She served as president of the House of Mercy corporation (now, Berkshire Medical Center), for 30 years, was a leader in the establishment of the Massachusetts State Board of Health, and the author of numerous books.

Her great interest in sanitary matters did not develop until after she married Thomas F. Plunkett, who in 1869, had a very important role in the establishment of the Massachusetts State Board of Health, the first state board established in the U.S. Mrs. Plunkett became convinced that if the women of the country would inform themselves what sanitary reform was needed in housing and living, and see that it was put in practice, there would be a great saving and lengthening of lives. To promote that cause, she wrote many newspaper articles, and in 1885, published a valuable book, Women, Plumbers, and Doctors, containing practical directions for securing a healthful home. Though interrupted in her work by the necessity of helping her son, who had become totally blind, she at once resumed her writing and returned to subjects of sanitation, though at the same time producing other articles, educational, aesthetic, and political, for various magazines and journals.

Her great interest in the prevention and healing of diseases also brought her before the public, and she was probably most widely known in connection with the establishment and growth of a cottage hospital in Pittsfield, Massachusetts, called the House of Mercy, started in 1874, and of which she was the president. It was the first one of its class to be supported by contributions from all religious denominations in the country.

== Early life and education ==
Harriette Merrick Hodge was born in Hadley, Massachusetts, February 6, 1826. She was the daughter of Henry and Eliza Hodge. Harriette's siblings were Mary, Lester, Elizabeth, Lephe, and William.

She was a descendant of Rev. Samuel Hopkins of West Springfield, Rev. John Wareham of Windsor, Connecticut, and Rev. Jonathan Edwards of Northampton, Massachusetts.

Plunkett began her early education at Hopkins Academy, an endowed school, alternating her attendance in school with terms of teaching in the district schools in her own and adjoining towns. This continued until 1845 when she became a pupil of the Maplewood Young Ladies' Institute, Pittsfield, Massachusetts. She graduated in 1846, being one of the first class who received diplomas.

== Career ==
She taught in the Maplewood Young Ladies' Institute a year.

On October 7, 1847, she married Thomas Fitzpatrick Plunkett (1804–1875). He was prominent in politics and served first in the Massachusetts House of Representatives, then later in the Massachusetts Senate. The couple had five children: Harriet, Helen, Lyman, Edward, and Margaret.

Till widowhood in 1875, she was principally absorbed in domestic duties and the care of a large family. In 1869, Mr. Plunkett had a very important share in the establishment of the Massachusetts State Board of Health, the first State board established in the U.S. Mrs. Plunkett became greatly interested in sanitary matters through her husband's influence, and was especially anxious to develop in the women of the U.S. an interest in the theory and practice of household sanitation. She was convinced that, if the women of the country would learn what is needed, and put it into practice, it would improve lives.

To promote that cause, she wrote many newspaper articles, and in 1885, published Women, Plumbers and Doctors, containing practical directions for creating a healthy home. She would probably would have continued to fulfill what seemed a mission to her, had not her only son, Dr. Edward L. Plunkett, at the age of 21, while studying to become a mechanical engineer, became totally blind. After the first shock and grief passed, he resolved to study medicine and enrolled himself as a member of the College of Physicians and Surgeons of New York, his mother becoming his reader and constant assistant. Through the use of pictures and models, she became his assistant, and by taking a five-year course instead of the usual three, he was graduated with honor and at once set about the instruction of medical undergraduates in the capacity of "coach" or "quiz-master," till 1890, when, after a week's illness, he died.

The work to which Mrs. Plunkett had dedicated herself having ending, she at once resumed writing and returned to sanitary subjects, though at the same time producing other articles, political, educational and aesthetic, for various magazines and journals. One, on the increasing longevity of the human race, entitled "Our Grandfathers Died Too Young", in the Popular Science Monthly (1891), attracted wide attention. In essay form, it described the progress in sanitation.

She was probably most widely known in connection with the establishment and growth of a cottage hospital in Pittsfield, called "The House of Mercy" (now, Berkshire Medical Center) started in 1874, of which she was president. It was the first one of its class, to be supported by contributions from all religious denominations.

In her role as President of the House of Mercy, Plunkett was a member of the American Public Health Association from 1893.

== Death ==
Harriette Merrick Plunkett died at her home in Pittsfield, December 26, 1906.

== Selected works ==
=== Books ===
- Women, Plumbers, and Doctors; Or, Household Sanitation, 1885 (text)
- Fighting Parson Allen, 1897 (text)

=== Articles and essays ===
- "Our Grandfathers Died Too Young", Popular Science Monthly (June 1891)
- "Josiah Gilbert Holland", 1894 (text)
- "Unveiling of the Great Genius. / Melville and Hawthorne", Sunday Republican, July 1, 1900, p. 14
