= Fairview Hospital (Massachusetts) =

- Berkshire Health Systems

Geography
- Location: Great Barrington, Massachusetts, United States
- Coordinates: 42°11′27.06″N 73°22′17.73″W

Services
- Beds: 25

Links
- Website: www.berkshirehealthsystems.org
- Lists: Hospitals in Massachusetts

Fairview Hospital is a private, non-profit 25-bed health care facility in Great Barrington, Massachusetts, owned by Berkshire Health Systems.

== History ==
On January 16, 2025; BHS announced a $70 million overhaul for the hospital starting early next year, which will include the purchase of an MRI scanner.

== Accreditation ==
Fairview is a federally designated Critical Access Hospital, and is equipped with a Joint Commission-accredited Emergency Department.

== See also ==
- Berkshire Medical Center
