= Josiah Gilbert Holland =

American author (1819–1881)

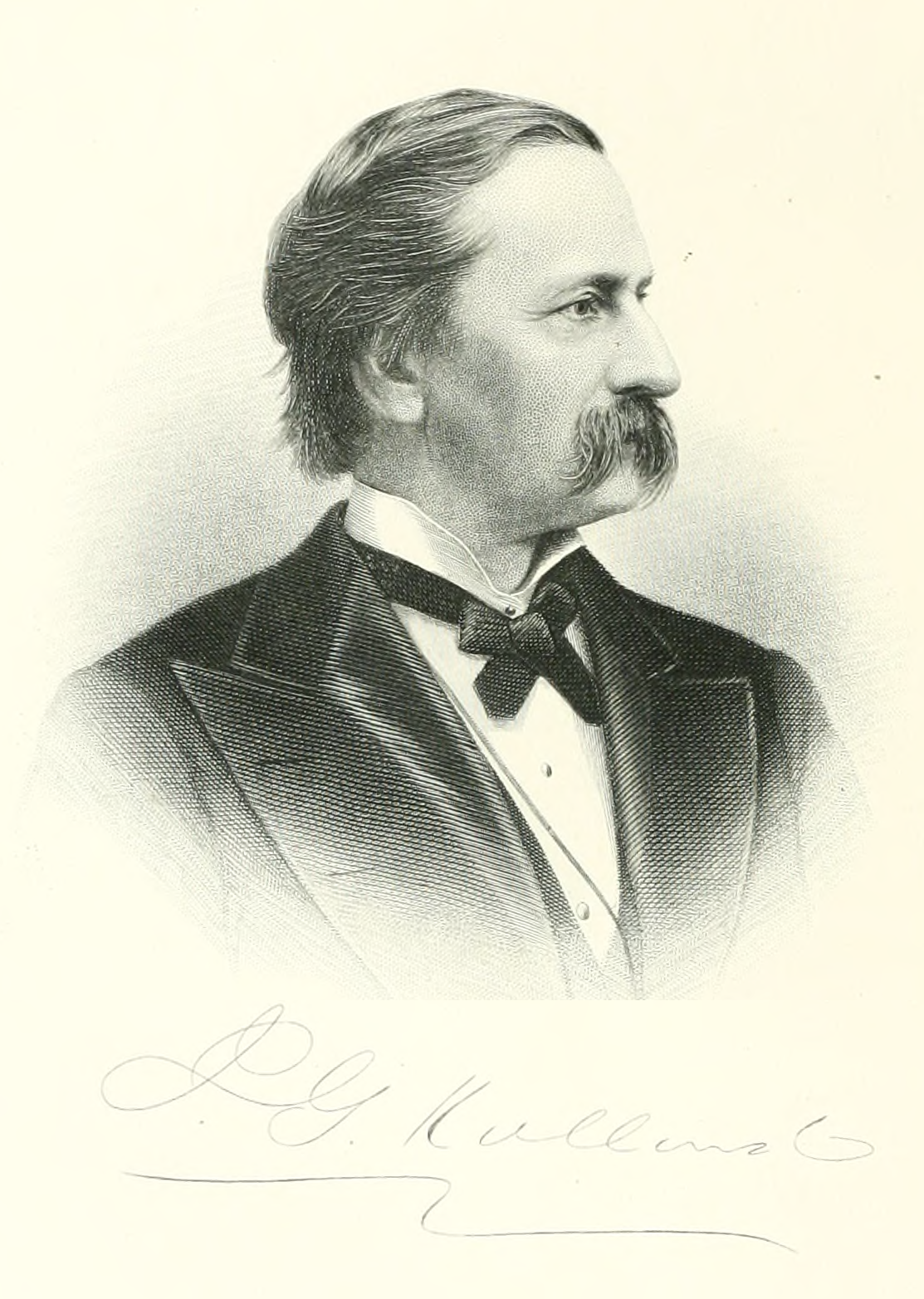
- Born: July 24, 1819; Dwight, Belchertown, Massachusetts, U.S.
- Died: October 12, 1881 (aged 62); Park Avenue, New York, New York, U.S.
- Resting place: Springfield Cemetery, Springfield, Massachusetts, U.S.
- Occupations: Writer; editor; poet; publisher; lecturer; physician; teacher; superintendent
- Employers: Springfield Republican; Scribner’s Monthly
- Spouse: Elizabeth Luna Chapin (m. 1845)
- Children: 5, including Arthur Gilbert, Annie Elizabeth H. Howe, Kate Melia H. Van Wagenen, Julia and Theodore
- Parent(s): Harrison Holland and Anna Gilbert
- Writing career
- Pen name: Timothy Titcomb; J.G. Holland
- Language: American English
- Years active: from 1844
- Period: Modern
- Genres: Romantic poetry; fiction; journalism; Fireside poets; travelogue; Self-help book; opinion journalism; literary criticism; polemic; essay; spiritual literature; advice column; autobiography; correspondence; oration
- Notable works: Life of Abraham Lincoln; Miss Gilbert’s Career; Bitter-sweet
- Movements: Romanticism, Transcendentalism and Literary realism

Signature
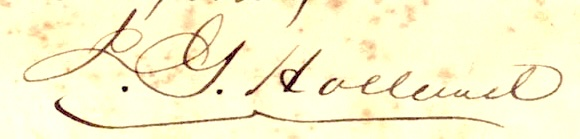

Josiah Gilbert Holland (July 24, 1819 – October 12, 1881) was an American novelist, essayist, poet and spiritual mentor to the country in the years following the Civil War.

Born in Western Massachusetts, he was "the most successful man of letters in the United States" in the latter half of the nineteenth century and sold more books in his lifetime than Mark Twain did in his.

Known by his initials "J.G.", Holland penned the first biography of Abraham Lincoln, just months after his assassination, which was a bestseller, and he published the first known poem written by an African American. One of Holland's novels was among the earliest examples of the genre that became literary realism and he published a few poems of Emily Dickinson's in The Republican, the newspaper he edited. Holland and his wife, Elizabeth Luna Chapin, were close friends with her.

Holland became a popular Lyceum lecturer and wrote advice essays under the pseudonym Timothy Titcomb. He composed lyrics to hymns, such as the beloved Methodist Christmas tune "There's a Song in the Air", which was published worldwide including translations into Tagalog and Belarusian. He helped establish, and was editor of, the middle-class flagship magazine Scribner's Monthly.

Though Holland was a contemporary of the canonical and more renowned poet and novelist Walt Whitman and Herman Melville, respectively, neither men "ever tasted the sweets of success as Holland did, perhaps, because neither wrote what the nation’s readers cared so much about". His writings are quoted by politicians and pastors alike though few today recognize Holland's name.

== Birth ==
He was born in a low-slung bungalow, built of logs, in a glade along the Hop Brook, near the intersection of Federal Street and Orchard Road, in the village of Dwight, in Belchertown, Massachusetts, on July 24, 1819.

His birthplace, once frequented by admirers, is to the immediate southwest of the Holland Glen Conservation Area, which was named for him in the early 20th century. Today it encompasses 290 acres, part of an old-growth forest, with steep hillsides, waterfalls, vistas and hiking trails.

His mother Anna's family, the Gilberts, from Hebron, Connecticut, arrived to North Belchertown by 1799 and operated an inn on the Bay Road not far from his birthplace (the home remains at 111 Old Bay Road). Josiah Gilbert Holland was likely named for his mother's younger brother, Josiah Gilbert, who died, at age 27, a few months after Holland's birth.

Holland grew up in a poor family struggling to make ends meet. Young Josiah spent only a few years at the farmhouse at Dwight and later quipped that he’d like to “burn it to the ground.” His wish came true, in fact, a few years before his own death, when someone intentionally set the old cottage on fire in 1876.

Josiah was the middle of seven children (a brother died at age 3) and his parents were deeply religious and evangelical, from pious Puritan stock. He was often called by his middle name, Gilbert, throughout his life by family members and intimates. His great-uncle Jonas Holland came to Belchertown from nearby Petersham in 1795 followed by his paternal uncles, Luther and Park, and his father. His uncle Luther manufactured, in Belchertown, the first horizontal pump fire engine made in the United States (his great-uncle Luther began building fire engines at Petersham).

Josiah's parents were married in 1810 by the "venerable" Belchertown pastor Justus Forward, of New England vampire panic notoriety and who assiduously cataloged the vital records of Belchertown inhabitants for half a century. His parents converted to Congregationalism in 1813, part of the evangelical furor brought on by the Second Great Awakening.

Josiah's father Harrison painted the first wagon manufactured in Belchertown, which became a center of the carriage trade in the United States. It was called "Warner's butterfly." Harrison Holland likely erected a small stone mill for a carding machine along a brook from Holland Pond, near the farm on which Josiah was born. There was little money to be earned: carding was transitioning to the larger factory mills at this time. The mill was later converted into a powder mill.

Harrison was what biographers called a "failed inventor;" his patented silk machine was used in China but he received little or no return. He moved the family every year or two: Heath, back to Belchertown, South Hadley, Granby and Northampton. "He was always inventing ingenious trifles," a biography states. "And sometimes made verses, and held the fatuously sanguine view that some other place and some distant morrow held a boon and blessing denied to the here and now." Josiah G. Holland later loosely based characters in several of his novels on his father.

Josiah worked in a factory to help the family. He then spent a short time studying at Northampton High School before withdrawing due to ill health. He tried daguerreotypy and taught penmanship from town to town, reciting "his own poems to his intimate friends." Between 1842 and 1843, three of Josiah's sisters died, Clarissa, Louisa and Lucretia, which had a profound impact upon him. He then saved enough money to study medicine at Berkshire Medical College, where he took a degree in 1843.

Hoping to become a successful physician, he began a medical practice with classmate Dr. Charles Bailey in Springfield, Massachusetts. He then opened a women’s hospital in Springfield with his former roommate from college, Charles Robinson, who would become the first governor of the State of Kansas, but it failed within six months.

In 1844, he wrote a city mystery (similar to the penny novel) called The Mysteries of Springfield under the pseudonym J. Wimpleton Wilkes. The cover states that it could be bought from dealers not only in Boston, New York, New Haven, and Hartford, but in Northampton and Cabotville (Chicopee) as well.

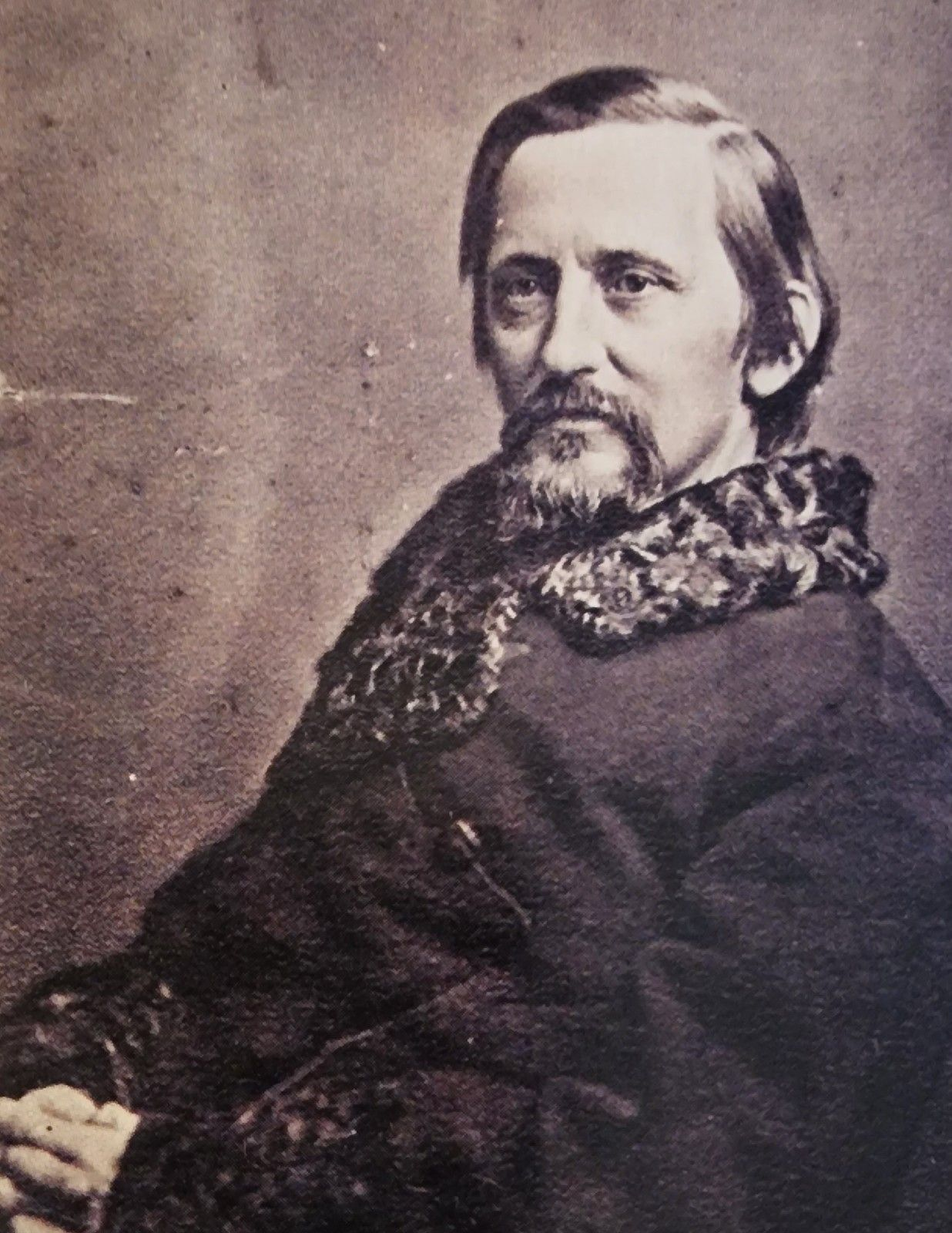
J.G. Holland in undated photograph

== Marriage and career ==
In 1845 he married Elizabeth Luna Chapin, “the scion of an old and substantial Springfield family.” The Puritan, an iconic statue of her ancestor Samuel Chapin, stands today in downtown Springfield. She would become a confidant and intimate friend of Emily Dickinson.

In early 1847, Holland begin publishing a newspaper, The Bay State Weekly Courier, but the attempt proved unsuccessful, as did his medical practice. He also published work in the Southern Literary Messenger.

He left New England that spring for the South, and took a teaching position in Richmond, Virginia, followed by one in Vicksburg, Mississippi, where he was named superintendent and implemented the ideas of fellow Massachusetts educator and reformer Horace Mann.

In fall 1848, he and his wife were invited to a large cotton plantation in northeastern Louisiana and Holland wrote down his observations. Here he received word that his poetry would be published in the Knickerbocker Magazine and The Home Journal.

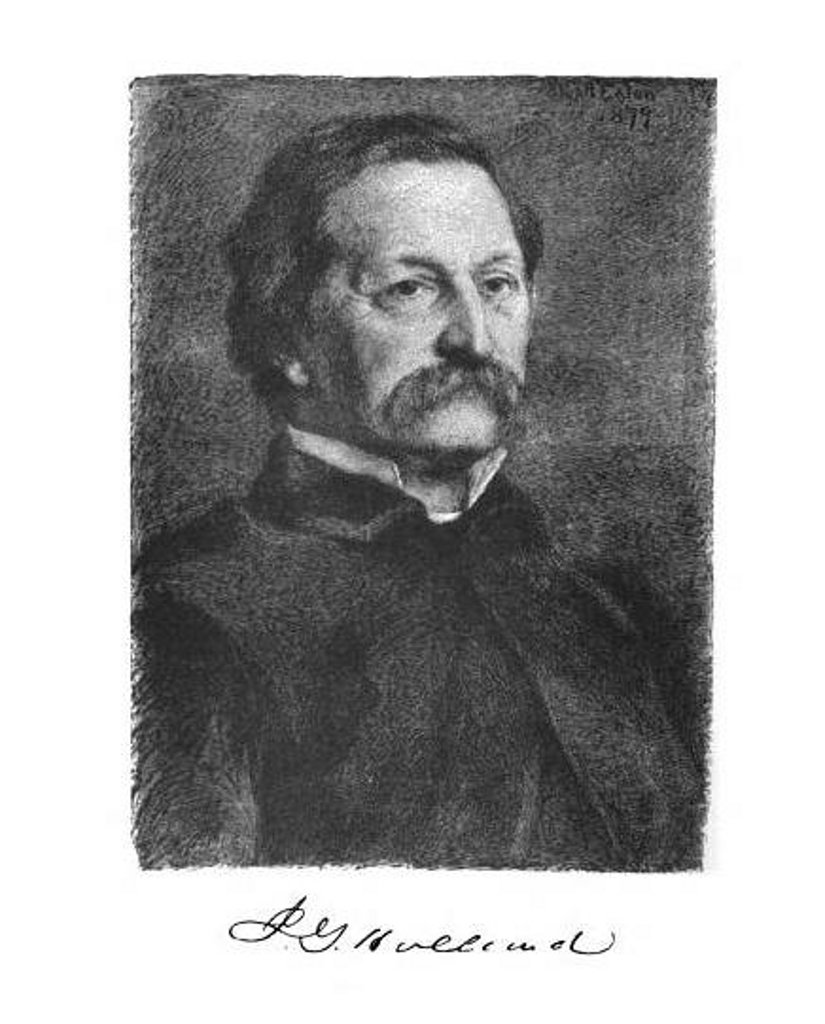
Josiah Gilbert Holland

=== Springfield ===
In April 1849, Holland and his wife returned to Western Massachusetts. His mother-in-law was dying and his wife went to care for her. The following month he was offered $40 a month as assistant editor of The Springfield Daily Republican, where he began working with the younger, formidable and charming owner—the journalist and editor Samuel Bowles.

On Wednesday, September 26, 1849, The Republican began publishing Holland's writing of plantation life in a seven-part series, though uncredited, titled, "Three Weeks on a Cotton Plantation." They were well-received by a curious public. He wrote local news and essays, many of which were collected and published in book form, helping establish his literary reputation. Bowles encouraged Holland to publish under the pseudonym Timothy Titcomb, which he did to great success. The writings were oftentimes formatted as letters, offering the public simple, personal, moral guidance and inspiration.

Under the editorial leadership of Bowles and Holland, The Republican became the most widely-read and respected small city daily in America. In 1851, Holland received an A.B. honorary doctorate degree from Amherst College, a few miles north from his birthplace, where Edward Dickinson (Emily Dickinson's father) was treasurer.

Holland's first book under his birth name was a two-volume History of Western Massachusetts (1855), the first book to feature a poem by a Black woman poet in the U.S. He followed in 1857 with an historical novel, The Bay-Path: A Tale of Colonial New England Life, and a collection of essays titled Titcomb's Letters to Young People, Single and Married in 1858. There were at least fifty editions of this book. He also published his narrative poem “Bitter-Sweet” that year. In 1857, he began touring on the Lyceum lecture circuit, soon mentioned with Oliver Wendell Holmes, Bayard Taylor and George William Curtis.

Gold-Foil: Hammered from Popular Proverbs under his Timothy Titcomb pen name came out in 1859. He published his second novel, Miss Gilbert‘s Career: An American Story, in 1860. It is considered one of the first novels of American Realism, anticipating “much abler and more penetrating realists” who would come later that century. The year following he released Lessons in Life: A Series of Familiar Essays (1861).

In 1862, he erected an opulent home in the Italianate villa style (also called a “Swiss-chalet style”). It was located on a bluff overlooking the Connecticut River in North Springfield near present day 110 Atwater Terrace. Holland named the mansion “Brightwood”; it was painted Venetian red. The neighborhood today retains the name Brightwood.

In August 1864, his poem, The Heart of the War, was published in the magazine,The Atlantic Monthly.

When Sam Bowles took an extended trip to Europe, Holland temporarily assumed the duties as editor-in-chief of The Springfield Republican. After the Civil War he reduced his editorial duties and wrote many of his most popular works, including the Life of Abraham Lincoln (1866), and Kathrina: Her Life and Mine, In a Poem (1867).

=== Lincoln ===
Holland wrote an eloquent eulogy of Abraham Lincoln within days of Lincoln's death, prompting a commission for a full biography of the late president. He quickly pulled together the lengthy Life of Abraham Lincoln, finished in February 1866. The 544-page bestseller portrayed Lincoln as an emancipator opposed to slavery and began many enduring myths about the slain President.

=== New York ===
He moved with his family to 46 Park Avenue in New York City in 1872. These years in New York were also productive for his own literary efforts. During the 1870s he published three novels: Arthur Bonnicastle (1873), Sevenoaks (1875), and Nicholas Minturn (1877), which first were serialized in Scribners (afterwards it became The Century Magazine). His poetry volumes included The Marble Prophecy (1872), The Mistress and the Manse (1874), and The Puritan's Guest (1881).

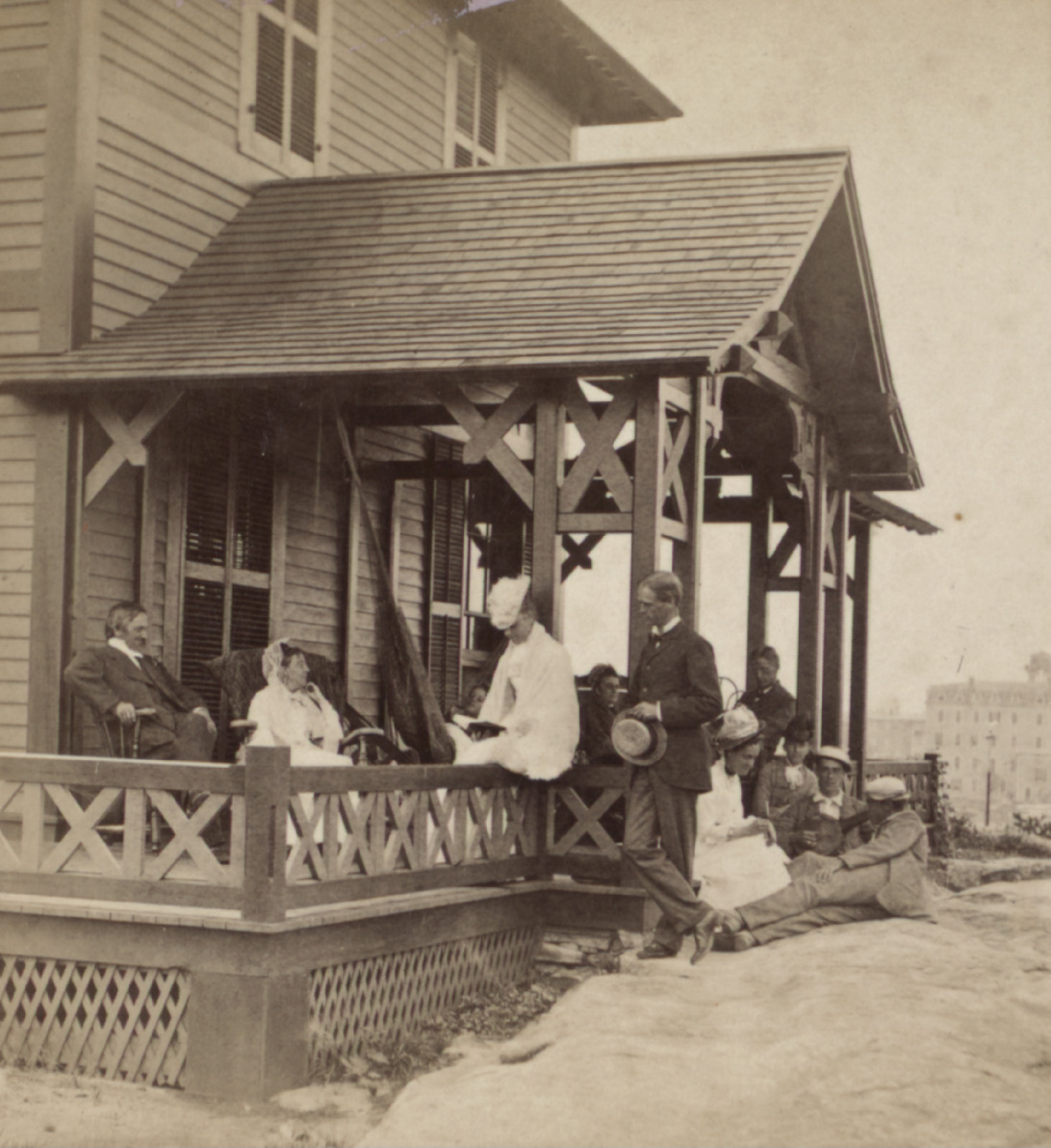
Josiah Gilbert Holland and others on the porch of Bonniecastle, Alexandria Bay, New York

In 1877, Holland erected a summer house on one of the Thousand Islands in upstate New York, in Alexandria Bay, where one of its streets is named for him. He gave the mansion itself the name “Bonniecastle” from the name of the titular hero of his novel, Arthur Bonnicastle (1873). It is known as the Bonnie Castle Resort & Marina today.

== Death ==
Josiah Gilbert Holland died on October 12, 1881, at the age of 62, in New York City of heart failure. The evening prior, he "remained late at the office to finish an editorial tribute to the martyred President James A. Garfield", who had been assassinated a few weeks before. Most small town newspapers and major metropolitan dailies published memorial tributes to Holland, including journals that had often spoken scornfully of his "literary mediocrity, his triteness, and his intellectual parochialism". John Greenleaf Whittier, the American Quaker poet and abolitionist, consistently praised Holland throughout his life and upon his death. The New York Times called Holland as "one of the most celebrated writers which this country has produced".

Holland is buried in Springfield Cemetery in Springfield, Massachusetts. His imposing monument includes a bas-relief portrait sculpted by the eminent American 19th-century sculptor, Augustus Saint-Gaudens, and includes the Latin inscription "Et vitam impendere vero" meaning "to devote life to truth".

== Works ==
- History of Western Massachusetts (1855)
- The Bay-Path: A Tale of Colonial New England Life (1857)
- Bitter-sweet; A Poem (1858)
- Letters to Young People, Single and Married (1858)
- Gold-Foil, Hammered from Popular Proverbs (1859)
- Miss Gilbert’s Career: An American Story (1860)
- Lessons in Life; A Series of Familiar Essays (1861)
- Letters to the Joneses (1863)
- The Life of Abraham Lincoln (1866)
- Kathrina: Her Life and Mine, in a poem, (1867)
- Christ And The Twelve: Or Scenes and Events in the Life of Our Saviour and His Apostles, as Painted by the Poets (1867)
- The Marble Prophecy, And Other Poems (1872)
- Garnered Sheaves: The Complete Poetical Works (1872)
- Illustrated Library of Favorite Song: Based upon folk songs, and comprising songs of the heart, songs of home, songs of life, and songs of nature (1872)
- Plain Talks On Familiar Subjects: A Series of Popular Lectures (1872)
- Arthur Bonnicastle: An American Novel (1873)
- The Mistress of the Manse: A Poem (1874)
- The Story of Sevenoaks: A Story of To-Day (1875)
- Nicholas Minturn: A Study in a Story (1876)
- Every-Day Topics: A Book of Briefs (1876) First series
- The Puritan’s Guest, And Other Poems (1881)
- Concerning the Jones Family (1881) (revised from the 1863 book)
- Every-Day Topics: A Book of Briefs (1882) Second series

== Legacy and influence ==
Although Josiah Gilbert Holland’s 23 books of fiction, nonfiction and poetry are rarely read today, during the late nineteenth century they were enormously popular and by 1894 more than 750,000 volumes were sold.

Holland was born at the beginning of the period of romanticism in American literature. He is considered one of the fireside poets such as contemporaries William Cullen Bryant and James Russell Lowell and his work appeared in anthologies, featuring domestic themes, messages of morality and focused on a historical romantic past. He is also categorized as among the ”minor” New England authors of the transcendental period.

In the History of American Literature by Leonidas Warren Payne, Jr., and published in 1919, Holland is “said to have reached a wider popular audience than most of the other minor poets.” Called "a poetic 'play' infused with the beauties of Christianity," Holland's first book-length poem Bitter-Sweet: A Poem (1858, 220 pp.) sold 90,000 copies by 1894 and remained in print four decades after his death. Thirty years after Holland's death, an "outstandingly authoritative commentator upon American literature" called Arthur Bonnicastle "the best" of Holland's five novels and another wrote that it was “undoubtedly Holland's masterpiece." The novel remained in print into the 1920s.

His critical legacy in other corners of academia quickly diminished at the turn of the century. In a textbook titled "American Literature" an influential scholar wrote, "For a time his works were immensely popular, and nothing better marks the swift change of literary tastes within a single generation then the comparative oblivion into which Holland's works have fallen."

In 1875, Holland wrote a letter to be read at the dedication of a monument to Edgar Allan Poe, the poet and writer, though Holland wrote that the man and his poetry were “without value.” Holland was against women's suffrage but donated funds to the New England Female Medical College in Boston. He was member of a Springfield church (North Congregationalist) that was frequented by abolitionists, freedmen and fugitive slaves though Josiah was not considered an abolitionist.

Literary clubs in Holland’s honor formed in towns and cities across the country, especially in the Midwest. Newspapers published memorials on the hundredth anniversary of his birth. Fans obtained wood from maple trees standing in the yard of his birthplace at Dwight, Mass., to fashion into memorabilia such as penholders. The doorstone of his birthplace, which burned to the ground in 1876, was recovered in 1932 and placed at the Stone House Museum, which also displays first editions of his works.

== On Emily Dickinson ==
J. G. Holland and his wife were frequent correspondents and intimate family friends of poet Emily Dickinson. She was a guest at their Springfield home on numerous occasions. Dickinson sent more than ninety letters to the Hollands between 1853 and 1886 in which she shares “the details of life that one would impart to a close family member: the status of the garden, the health and activities of members of the household, references to recently-read books.”

Emily was a poet “influenced by transcendentalism and dark romanticism"; her work bridged “the gap to Realism.” Of the ten poems published in Dickinson's lifetime, the Springfield Daily Republican, with Sam Bowles and Josiah Holland as editors, published five, all unsigned, between 1852 and 1866. Some scholars believe that Bowles promoted her the most; Dickinson wrote letters and sent her poems to both men. Later, as editor of Scribner’s Monthly beginning in 1870, Holland told Dickinson’s childhood friend Emily Fowler Ford that he had “some poems of [Dickinson’s] under consideration for publication [in Scribner’s Monthly]—but they really are not suitable—they are too ethereal.”

== Publishes oldest African American poem ==
Josiah Gilbert Holland published the oldest known work of literature written by an African American in North America. A 16-year-old named Lucy Terry (1733–1821) witnessed two White families attacked by Native Americans in 1746. The fight took place in Deerfield, Mass. Known as “Bars Fight,” her poem was told orally until it was published, thirty-three years after her death, first in The Springfield Daily Republican, on November 20, 1854, as an excerpt from Holland's History of Western Massachusetts, which was published as a book the following year.

== On Melville and Whitman ==
Holland, Herman Melville and Walt Whitman were born the same year.

Holland, as associate editor of The Republican, was critically favorable to canonical novelist Herman Melville and as co-founder and editor of Scribner's Monthly, Holland turned down publishing the more widely read canonical poet Walt Whitman.

Considered a writer and man of "Victorian virtue," J.G. Holland found Whitman's poetry “immoral.” Whitman later called Holland, “a man of his time, not possessed of the slightest forereach; ... the style of man ... who can tell the difference between a dime and a fifty-cent piece—but is useless for occasions of more serious moment.” The irony was that Holland wrote a bestseller after the “more serious moment” of President Lincoln’s assassination. All the same, even Springfield Republican publisher Samuel Bowles "thought Holland something of a prig.” A later biographer had this to say:

That Josiah Gilbert Holland remained priggish and prudish to the end of his days is all too abundantly attested. His provincial ethical standards; his subconscious Pharisaism; his incorrigible moralizing; his stubborn opposition to woman suffrage; his failure to distinguish between social drinking and debauchery, between light wine and strong whisky, between beer and rum, between the intelligent frankness of Walt Whitman and the vulgar pornography of The Black Crook—all these remained almost as irritatingly obtrusive at the end of his career as at the beginning.

== On the word "jazz" ==
Holland coined a term that later became the word "jazz." The earliest tracing in the Oxford English Dictionary finds that “jasm” first appears in Holland’s 1860 novel, Miss Gilbert's Career: “‘She's just like her mother... Oh! she’s just as full of jasm!’.. ‘Now tell me what jasm is.’.. ‘If you'll take thunder and lightening [sic], and a steamboat and a buzz-saw, and mix 'em up, and put 'em into a woman, that's jasm.’”

The word was used to describe the "inexpressible personal force of the Yankee" and morphed into the word “jazz” in the early twentieth century.

== Postbellum spiritual mentor ==
In the devastating wake of the American Civil War, Holland offered Americans spiritual guidance and ultimately, hope.

That there was a Dr. Holland, a man who brought hope, reassurance, continuity and order into a chaotic, threatening world was itself a fact of great spiritual significance for millions of Americans. Unlike Henry Ward Beecher, whom he steadfastly supported, nothing even remotely suspect ever came near him. Instead, in such essays as "The Reconstruction of National Morality," published in April 1876, and "Falling from High Places," published in April 1878, he offered acute analyses of why, in the post-war years, so many Americans, including prominent Christian leaders, had succumbed to the temptation of attempting to obtain great riches dishonestly. Such was the sanctity of Holland's own life that he seemed to offer a living, earthly warrant for the promise of eternity that he pictured in his writings.

Of poets and their mission, Holland wrote:

The poets of the world are the prophets of humanity. They forever reach after and foresee the ultimate good. They are evermore building the Paradise that it is to be, painting the Millennium that is to come. When the world shall reach the poet’s ideal, it will arrive at perfection; and much good will it do the world to measure itself by this ideal and struggle to lift the real to its lofty level.

He also wrote: "God never said it would be easy, He just said He would go with me." Holland’s narrative poem “Bitter-Sweet” would become one of his most popular, and was described in 1894, by biographer Harriette Merrick Plunkett, as,

Dr. Holland’s reflections on the mysteries of Life and Death, on the soul-wracking problems of Doubt and Faith, on the existence of Evil as one of the vital conditions of the universe, on the questions of Predestination, Original Sin, Free-will, and the whole haunting brood of Calvinistic theological metaphysics.

She declared it to be “truly an original poem,” and compared it to the works of Robert Burns or Sir Walter Scott. She cited the praise that it had earned from poet James Russell Lowell. Today, a Holland sentence or paragraph is still quoted by politicians, artists and spiritual leaders alike, including Martin Luther King, Jr., though few recognize his name.

== In film ==
In 1920, Holland’s novel Sevenoaks (1875) was adapted into the Goldwyn comedy-drama, Jes' Call Me Jim, starring Will Rogers.

In the 2016 film A Quiet Passion about the life of Emily Dickinson, Steve Dan Mills portrays Holland.

In the 2018 film Wild Nights with Emily, Josiah and Elizabeth Holland are portrayed by actor Michael Churven and actress Guinevere Turner, respectively.

The Osage Nation politician Arthur Bonnicastle—named for the titular character in Holland’s 1873 novel—appears as a character in the 2023 film Killers of the Flower Moon.
