= House of Mercy (cottage hospital) =

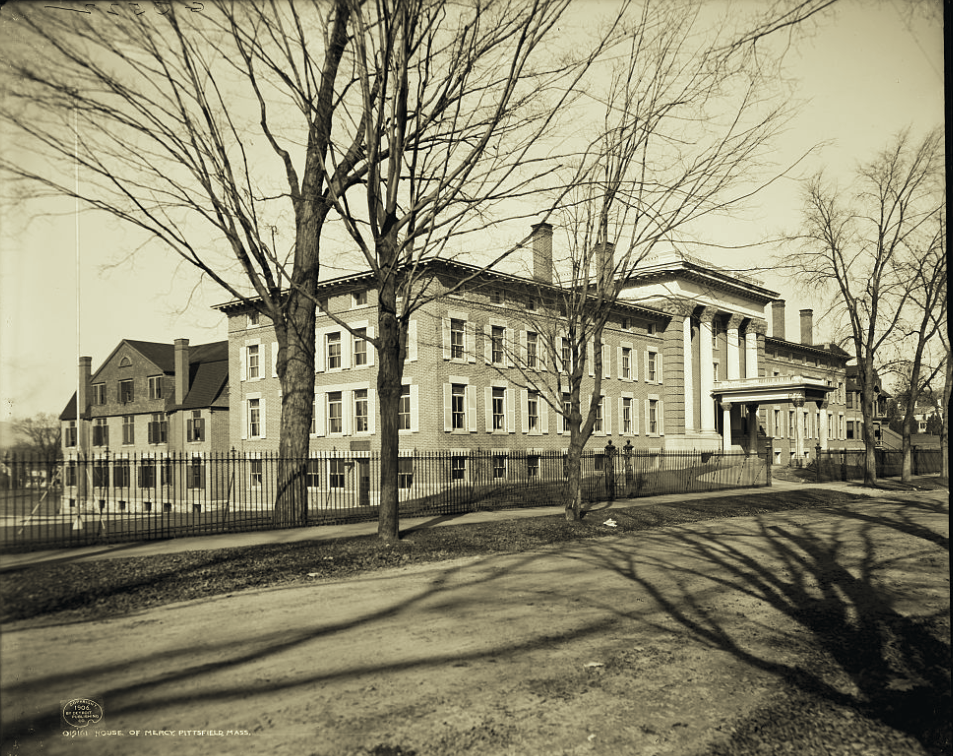
- House of Mercy (ca. 1906)

Geography
- Location: Pittsfield, Massachusetts, U.S.
- Coordinates: 42.4592°N 73.2490°W

Organisation
- Type: cottage hospital

History
- Opened: January 1, 1875
- Closed: Moved in 1949 and renamed Pittsfield General Hospital.; In 1968, it became the Berkshire Medical Center.

House of Mercy (later known as, Pittsfield General Hospital and Berkshire Medical Center) was an American cottage hospital incorporated in 1874 and located in Pittsfield, Massachusetts. It was designed especially for the treatment of surgical and acute cases from Pittsfield and neighboring towns, and was managed by women of the several religious societies in Pittsfield. The physicians in attendance rendered their services gratuitously. Pittsfield's House of Mercy was the first American cottage hospital, and in its early days, it served as the model cottage hospital of Massachusetts. Nonetheless, some of the arrangements in this hospital and some of the hygienic precautions were open to criticism.

== Establishment ==
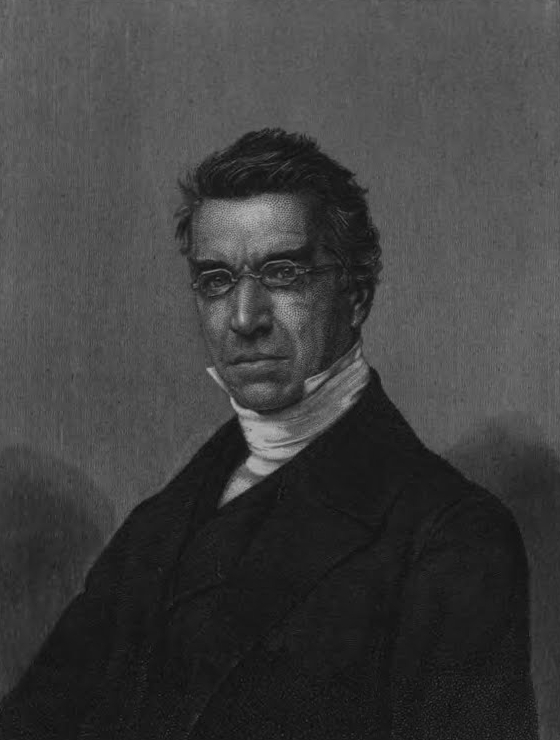
Rev. Dr. John Todd

The "House of Mercy" at Pittsfield was first located on Francis Street. It was established in 1874, Rev. Dr. John Todd having originated the charity. The hospital opened on January 1, 1875, as a result of the united efforts of the charitable women of the town. These women held, in September 1874, a "hospital bazaar", from which, together with sundry donations, was realized a sum of approximately US$6,000, which was sufficient to enable them to furnish a building, and to invest the remainder, the interest of which was reserved for rent. They then effected an organization, obtained a charter, rented a pleasantly situated two-storey dwelling house, furnished it appropriately, obtained the services of an experienced nurse who was made the matron, and invited the physicians of the town to give their services to the institution.

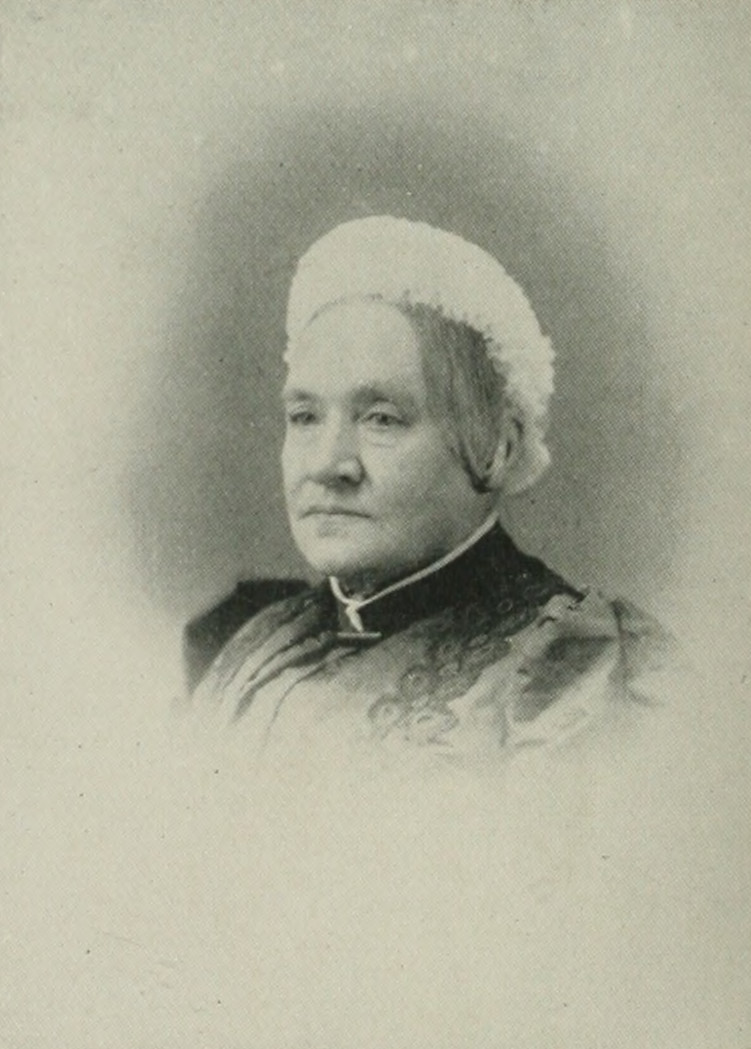
Harriette Merrick Plunkett

The corporation consisted entirely of women from the following churches: First Congregational, Methodist, South Congregational, St. Joseph's Roman Catholic, German Lutheran, Baptist, and St. Stephen's Episcopal. The officers were a president, namely Harriette Merrick Plunkett, four vice-presidents, clerk, treasurer, corresponding secretary, recording secretary, and 21 directors, three from each of the seven churches working for the hospital. These officers constituted a Board of Control, in which Board were vested the property and affairs of the corporation.

== 1874-1877 ==
The building rented for the hospital was a neatly furnished two story frame dwelling house which had recently been enlarged, so that the front part was quite new. It was a pleasantly situated house, of ten rooms, which were used as follows:-On the ground floor, a reception or committee room, matron's room, kitchen, and two rooms for patients, each containing two beds; on the second floor, two rooms for private patients, each with one bed, one room with two beds, and two rooms for assistants. The hospital had, therefore, a capacity of eight beds.

As no sewer had been laid in the street in which the hospital was situated, it was necessary to remedy certain sanitary imperfections which the house had in common with the majority of village dwellings; and this was accomplished at small expense.

For three years, this building was used for hospital purposes. Its working force consisted of the matron, and a woman in the kitchen, such help as was requisite having been obtained from convalescents, and additional nurses having been provided by the ladies' committee when necessary. The benefits of the institution, unlike most of the English cottage hospitals, were not limited to acute cases and accidents; but chronic and incurable cases were also received, several patients having literally been carried there to die. Persons able to pay were expected to do so in proportion to their means, and those unable to pay were taken free. Nearly all were charity patients.

To obtain admission to the House of Mercy, it was necessary to obtain a certificate signed by a member of the women's "Committee on Admission," and by one of the two medical men designated as “Admitting Physicians," accidents being admitted without any certificate.

The physicians of the town acted as attending physicians in rotation, but pay patients were at liberty to select their own physicians.

Sixty patients were admitted during the first three years. Out of these, there were nine deaths. To prevent the house becoming too much of a home for chronic invalids, the women made a rule that no patient shall remain more than three months, unless by a vote of the Board of Control.

No specified dietary was used, "full diet" being understood to mean an abundance of good food. Extra diet was prescribed as required. The house had no dispensary, but an arrangement has been made with the druggists, by which medicines were provided at a reduction from their usual charges, and prescriptions were sent to each, in rotation, for two months at a time. The women proved to the liberal providers, furnishing everything which the physicians thought needful for the sick.

The income of the institution was derived, in part, from the interest on the fund, which was just enough to pay the rent of the house, while the remainder was raised by the persistent efforts of the women. The sources of income, apart from the fund, were life memberships, annual subscriptions, donations, "Hospital Sunday," various entertainments, and patients' payments. Besides donations of money, much was contributed in the way of provisions, such as clothing, and several families agree each to send a "basket" once a year, this to contain such provisions as were most needed. The total expenses of the house, including rent, averaged somewhat less than £24 (equivalent to £2,854 in 2023) a month.

== 1877-1885 ==
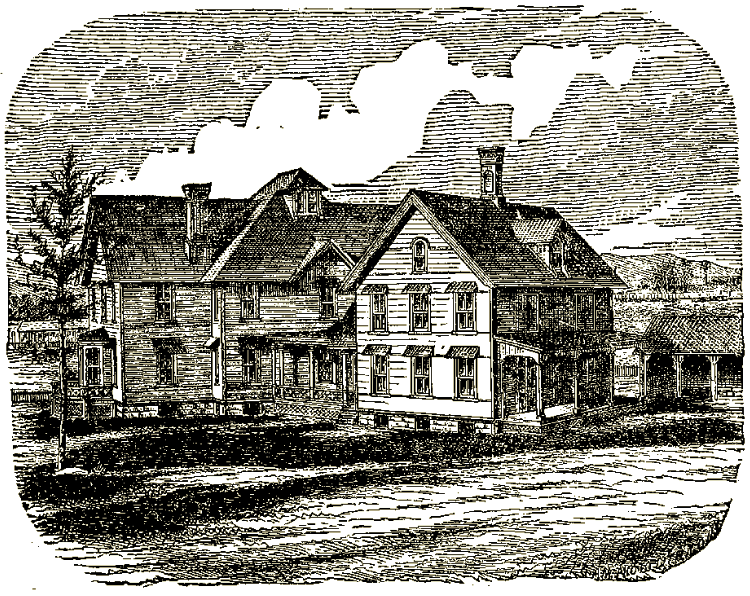
(1877)

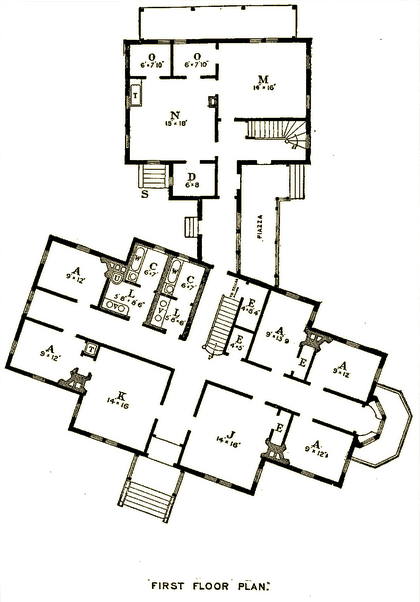
First floor plan

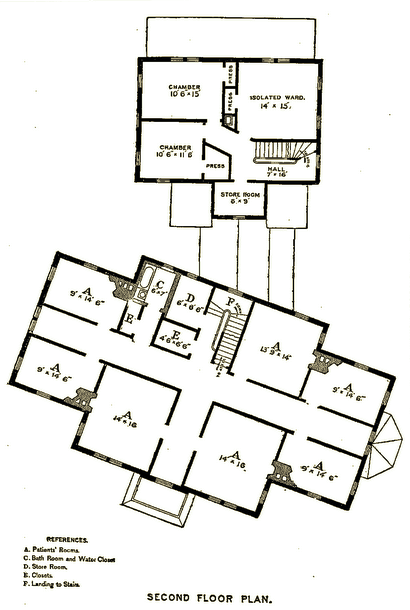
Second floor plan

Early in 1877, the women became convinced that the house they rented was unsuitable for their purpose, being on clay soil, which rendered the cellar damp in spite of attempted drainage, having imperfect ventilation, and being without many essential conveniences. They therefore decided to build a suitable structure, and took the first step by purchasing a triangular piece of land, at the intersection of three streets at the northern limit of the town, at the intersection of North and Tyler streets. The area was .75 acres (0.30 ha), and the soil a coarse dry gravel. Upon this, they erected a hospital for 13 beds, capable of holding more if necessary. The directors of the charity laid out about US$12,000 in land, building, and some furniture. Charles T. Rathbun was the architect.

It was a two-story frame building, or, more precisely, two separate buildings connected by a short corridor. On account of the triangular shape of the site, these two buildings were placed obliquely to each other, so as to make them parallel with the two streets upon which they respectively fronted.

The principal building contained the reception or committee room, matron's room, and twelve rooms for patients. There were no general wards, it having been decided to have single-bedded rooms only. This building also contained the bathrooms and water-closets, which were so centrated in the two stories as to be surrounded with a brick wall, forming a square tower within the building, lighted by windows to the east. Every room in this building had an open fireplace, connected with a large flue in one of the four massive chimneys. This building fronted to the north-west; the other, or smaller one, is connected with it by a covered corridor, which, running east and west, had its south side composed entirely of windows looking out upon a south piazza, sheltered by the two buildings from both east and west winds. The lesser building contained, on the lower floor, kitchen and dining-room; on the upper floor, servants' rooms, and an isolated ward for contagious or infectious cases. The dining room, which was also a convalescents' room, was at the south-east corner of the building, and had glass doors opening upon a piazza, which occupied the length of the east side of the building. The main entrance was placed at the middle of the front of the main building, and was sheltered by a large porch. There was a second entrance from the south piazza, and a back door to the north. On entering the front door the matron's room being on the right hand, and the reception room on the left. A passageway ran across the building, continuous with the corridor beyond, this passageway being intersected with another running through the center of the building, from north to south, terminating in a bay window at the southern end. Outside of the bay window was an enclosed balcony. The stairs were placed at the longitudinal passage in the center of the building. The length of the building was 66 feet 6 inches; its width was 37 feet 9 inches at the center and 26 feet at the ends. The reception and matron's rooms measured each 14 by 16 feet. There were five rooms for patients on the lower floor, of which four measure 9 by 12 feet, and one 9 feet by 13 feet 9 inches. On the second floor there were two rooms measuring 14 by 16 feet, one 14 feet by 13 feet 9 inches, and four 9 feet by 14 feet 6 inches. The height of the lower story was 9 feet 6 inches, and of the upper story 9 feet. The floor of the upper story was deadened with brick and mortar.

The walls of the whole building were back plastered to add to their warmth, and were further protected by builder's paper placed beneath the clapboards; the most exposed parts having, in place of the paper, large sheets of heavy pasteboard, similar to binder's board. All the windows were large and high, and hung with weights. The fireplaces were made with pressed brick, surmounted with wooden mantles, and were provided with flat iron grates for burning wood. There were two bathrooms on the lower floor, each containing a water-closet, one for men and one for women. Each was reached from the passageway through a lavatory containing set washing basins, thus placing two doors between each water-closet and the passageway. A slop sink was placed in one of the lavatories. One of the bath tubs was placed on India-rubber rollers, so as to be wheeled into the patients' room if desired. On the upper floor there was but one bathroom, though space was provided for another should it be required.

All the soil-pipes were ventilated by means of a vertical six-inch iron pipe, which entered one of the chimneys just below the roof. The bathrooms had ventilators. The walls were plastered throughout the building, the plaster being treated with three coats of oil paint, which allowed them to be thoroughly cleansed. A variety of tints was employed, adding to the attractiveness of the interior. The building was thoroughly heated throughout by steam. The high roof afforded a large, light, and well-ventilated attic, which, having a good floor, could easily be utilized as a ward if necessary. The smaller building also had a roomy, well-lighted attic, likewise capable of being used as a ward. The cellar was high, light, and dry, and extended under the whole of both buildings and the connecting corridor. The building was supplied with the public water supply, and was lit with gas.

One of the rooms opening from the reception room was intended as an operating room, and was provided with hot and cold water. As no sewer passed sufficiently near the hospital to be connected with it, two large stoned cesspools were placed about 80 feet north of the building, one connecting with the main building, the other with the kitchen. The soil, being a coarse bibulous gravel, was well-adapted for cesspools.

The exterior walls were painted gray with buff trimmings, and the shingled roof and window caps were of slate color.

The corner stone was laid with appropriate ceremonies on September 1, 1877, and the building was first occupied on the January 15, 1878, just three years from the opening of the temporary house. The cost of the building, including steam apparatus and all other extras, was about £1,700 (equivalent to £208,414 in 2023), and the cost of the site £200 (equivalent to £23,781 in 2023). The women raised the money through donations and entertainments, so that the hospital was free from debt.

By 1885, the directors had a fund of about US$6,000. The money used every year came from annual subscriptions and other donations, from bequests, and entertainments given in benefit, conducted by the officers of the institution. The late gift of a fine mortuary chapel to the hospital was a notable act of charity by Rebecca F. Coffing, of Van Deusenville, Massachusetts. The chapel was erected in memory of her husband, John H. Coffing. It cost about US$1,400, and was located adjoining the House of Mercy. In the rear part of the building was the autopsy room; in the front part, the audience room, having large double windows on three sides and capable of seating 50 to 60 people. It was provided with chairs and reading desk, and was heated from a fire-place. On the chimney, above the fireplace, was a tablet of polished black marble, with a memorial inscription.

== 1890s ==
In 1890, there was built a small brick isolated ward, for the treatment of contagious and infectious diseases. In 1892, an addition was made to the original hospital building, increasing the number of beds to 50. In 1893, the Laflin operating-room was built, and was adapted to the aseptic treatment of surgical cases. In 1894, 291 patients were treated. A modern ambulance was added to the hospital equipment by 1895.

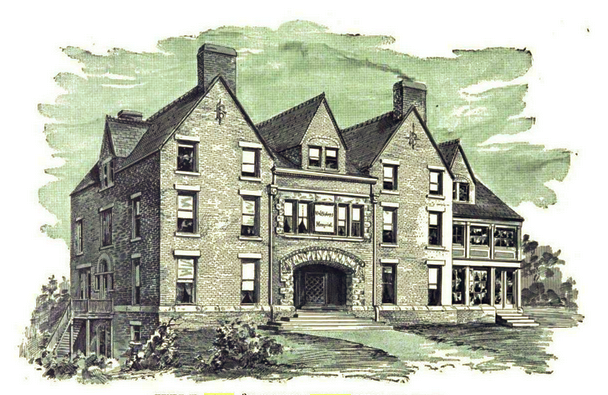
Henry W. Bishop, 3d, Memorial Training School for Nurses

The Henry W. Bishop, 3rd, Memorial Training School for Nurses was constructed in 1889, as an adjunct of the House of Mercy. By 1894, the school had graduated 72 nurses.

== 20th-century ==
In 1912, it was reported that the House of Mercy had 99 paid officers or employees. In that year, there had been 1,880 patients, of which 802 were paying, 497 were party paying, and 581 were free. The value of real estate owned and occupied for corporate purposes was US$250,000; and the value of investments was US$339,313.

In 1902 the hospital treated patients form a tram crash involving president Theodore Roosevelt.

When the House of Mercy moved to a new, larger location in 1949, it was renamed Pittsfield General Hospital. After a merger with St. Luke's Hospital in 1968, it became the Berkshire Medical Center.
