= Samuel Bowles (journalist) =

American newspaper editor (1826–1878)

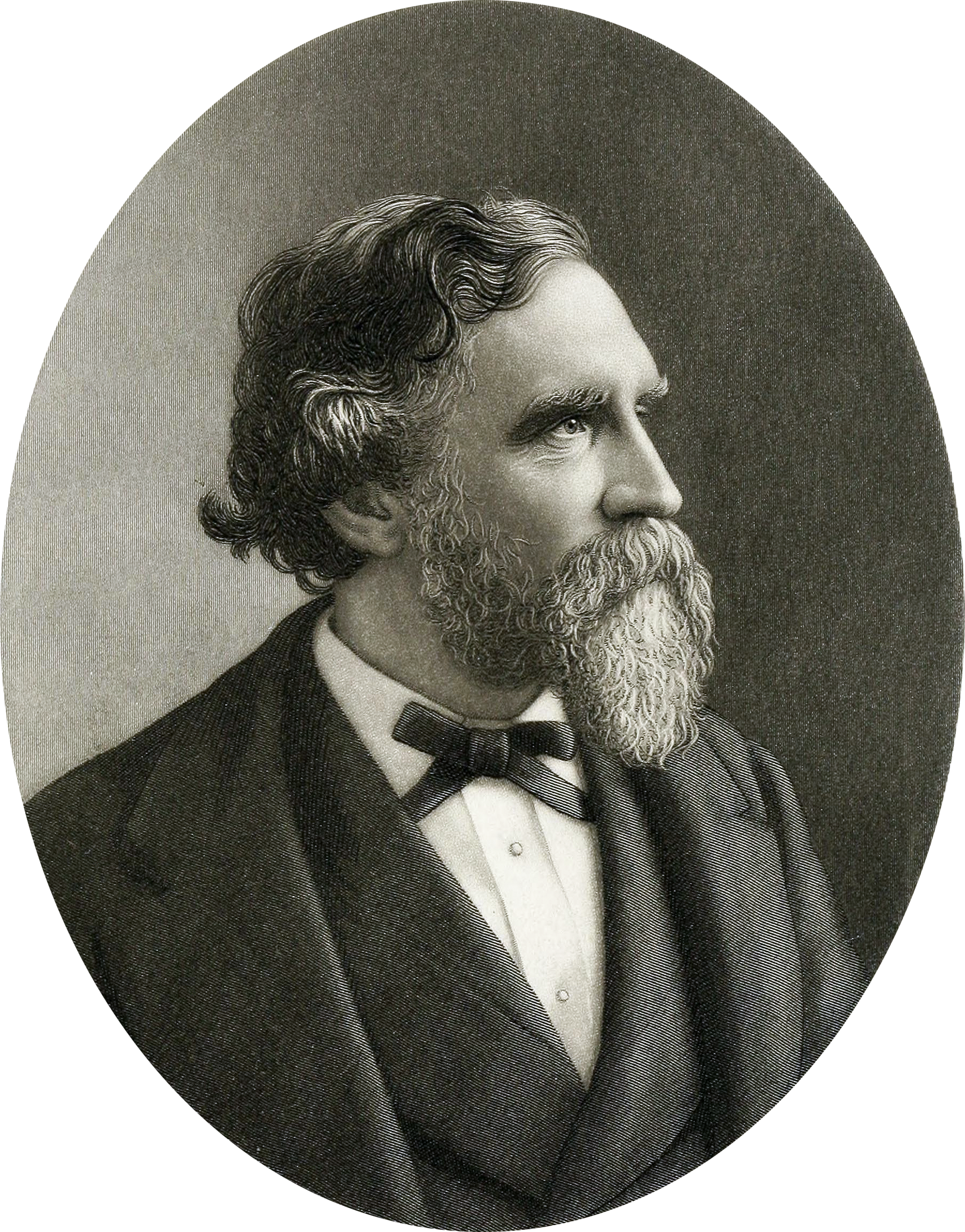
- Born: Samuel Bowles III; February 9, 1826; Springfield, Massachusetts, U.S.
- Died: January 16, 1878 (aged 51); Springfield, Massachusetts, U.S.
- Occupations: Journalist; newspaper editor; publisher; travel writer
- Spouse: Mary Schermerhorn
- Writing career
- Language: English
- Period: 1844–1878
- Genres: Journalism and travel writing

Samuel Bowles III (February 9, 1826 – January 16, 1878) was an American journalist and newspaper publisher. From 1844 to 1878, he was the publisher and editor of the Springfield Republican, which became a national model for regional newspapers. He was "a pioneer in the establishment of independent journalism".

== Early life ==
Bowles was born in Springfield, Massachusetts, to Huldah (née Deming) and Samuel Bowles Jr. His father established the Springfield Weekly Republican newspaper in 1824. Growing up, Bowles shared a room with three of his father's apprentices and delivered newspapers to his father's subscribers. One biographer characterizes his childhood household as "frugal".

Bowles was educated in public schools, but was sent to Master George Eaton's private school in Springfield when he was thirteen. He wanted to attend college, but his father found college was unnecessary to train as a printer. It is also possible that the cost of college was a factor in his decision. At the age of seventeen, Bowles began work in the printing office of the Republican. For the first year, he was a general helper who did mechanical jobs, ran errands, and wrote articles on local topics.

== Career ==
In 1844, Bowles convinced father to expand the newspaper to include a daily edition. At the time, "daily journalism ... was pioneering work, calling for an exhausting expenditure of personal energy." The first issue of the Daily Evening Republican was published on March 27, 1844. Bowles took on general management of the daily newspaper, while his father continued to publish the weekly edition. The daily paper started with no advertisers and no subscribers. It lost $200 its first year, and only had 200 subscribers after two years. By comparison, the Weekly Republican started with a circulation of 350 copies. Not giving up, Bowles pivoted.

The Republican became a morning paper in December 1845. That change required its editors to work through the night. His father devoted more attention to the business office and finances, while Baldwin took on expanded editorial duties for both the daily and weekly Republican. He was assisted by writer and poet Dr. Josiah Gilbert Holland as editor. After two years, Holland purchased a 25% interest in the newspaper for $3,500. In addition to news, the Republican covered art, charity, farming, literature, local life, religious news, and social affairs, along with poetry, short fiction, political editorials, and sermons. By the fourth year, the morning edition of the Republican had 800 subscribers—giving it the largest circulation of any daily newspaper in New England, outside of Boston. Bowles reinvested profits into equipment and larger facilities.

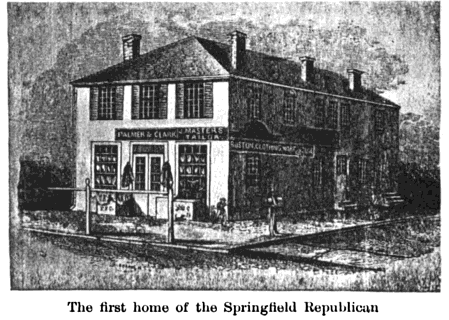
First Home of the Springfield Republican

In 1851 his father died, and the entire management of the newspaper went to the 25-year-old Bowles. He was involved in all aspects of the paper's operations and retained primary editorial control for most of his career. He gained a reputation "as an industrious, bold, and fearless journalist". In 1855, he expanded the paper from a single sheet to a double sheet. The paper gained a national reputation even though it remained mostly regional, focusing on Springfield and surrounding towns. Circulation grew to more than 5,000 for the daily edition and more than 10,000 for the weekly edition. The New York Tribune called it "the best and ablest country journal published on the continent".

After receiving offers for various jobs and newspaper partnerships, in early 1857 Bowles entered into a partnership to publish a new daily paper out of Boston Massachusetts, the Boston Traveller. This project lacked the credibility of other offers, but "was to be Republican, independent, and progressive". He invested $10,000 in the venture and resigned as editor of the Republican so he could be the editor of the Traveller for a salary of $3,000 a year. Unfortunately, the Traveller's owners were not united on policy, and there was a lack of capital needed for a successful launch. For four months, Bowles struggled, feeling "thwarted and misunderstood". He resigned and took a trip out West before returning home to his wife and children in Springfield. Josiah Holland generously stepped down as editor-in-chief of the Republican, allowing Bowles to return to his prior role.

In 1857, Bowles decided to gain full editorial control by buying Holland's share of the business. However, Holland continued to contribute articles for the Republican until 1864. In 1872, Bowles used his majority ownership of the newspaper's parent company, Samuel Bowles & Co., to split the organization. He retained the newspaper, giving the other investors, Bryan and Tapley, the binding and miscellaneous printing concerns. However, Bowles' approach alienated minor shareholder and twenty-year business partner Clark W. Bryan. Bryan, along with Tapley, purchased the Republican's competition—the Springfield Union and vastly expanded its production. William M. Pomeroy, managing editor of the Republican, became editor of the Union. Another Republican staffer, Joseph Shipley, also joined the Union; he eventually replaced Pomeroy as editor of the Union in 1881. Bryan would go on to found Good Housekeeping.

The long-running success of Bowles's newspaper was attributed not only to its content and local relevancy, but also to its "lively, concise, and professionally written style". Biographer George S. Merriam wrote, "His style was admirable—simple, direct, pure, forcible without being passionate, pungent without being vulgar, often delicately sarcastic and deliciously humorous, never egotistical, never suggesting the writer, always representing the journal, and this as the voice of the people—he was by nature, by culture, by experience the model modern working journalist. He saw the world without, partly through others, but chiefly through its own words, interpreted to him by his own divine instincts."

As his health declined in later years, Bowles turned over the operation of the newspaper to a team of men. During his lifetime, the Republican served as a school of sorts for young journalists, "especially in the matter of pungency and conciseness of style". His trainees, Charles R. Miller and Robert G. Fitch, went on to become editor of the New York Times and Boston Post, respectively.

== Politics ==
Bowles believed in taking a strong moral and political stance through his newspaper, regardless of public sentiment. Once his father died, Bowles had editorial control of the Republican; his influence was felt immediately, not only through heated discussions about President James Buchanan's administration, but also during the Civil War itself. He "announced that the Springfield Republican was still devotedly Whig." When the Whig Party fell apart, he condemned "Know-Nothing" party and exposed its fallacies.

In the early 1850s Bowles's position on slavery was conservative. He wrote against the abolitionists and supported the Fugitive Slave Act. However, during the debate over the Kansas-Nebraska Act, he had a change of heart. Moving forward, the Republican had an anti-slavery agenda. He wrote about the need for a "new party of freedom" and headed efforts to create a Republican Party in Massachusetts in 1855. He was one of the first editors to support abolitionist John C. Frémont for president of 1856. He also denounced the execution of John Brown. In 1860, Bowles was a delegate for the Republican party's convention in Chicago where Abraham Lincoln was affirmed as a presidential candidate. Bowles told his readers, "Lincoln is a man of the most incorruptible integrity—firm as a rock against duplicity, dishonesty, and all dishonorable conduct, public and private." While he did support Abraham Lincoln's presidency and emancipation, Bowles also criticized the president's infringement upon civil rights.

After the war, Bowles attacked carpetbaggers and supported Lincoln's recommendations for a "mild and magnanimous policies of reconstruction". Rather naively, Bowles' "Yankee faith in human behavior convinced him that enlightened self-interest would compel Southerners to renounce the ideas and institutions for which they had fought." In contrast to Frederick Douglas and William Lloyd Garrison, Bowles believed freed slaves needed protection from potential exploitation from their former masters. He strongly supported the efforts of the Freedman's Bureau and other organizations providing education and guidance, with military backing if needed. He also suggested that confiscated plantations should be divided into small farms for sale to former slaves. Although Bowles acknowledged that free land was fair compensation for years of enslavement, he saw greater value in encouraging the emancipated to work for wages, as this would develop a middle class with "bargaining power". However such position was not needed to vote, according to Bowles. On March 8, 1865, the Republican favored giving anyone who could read and write the right to vote. Clearly, Bowles was also an advocate for women's suffrage. However, he was against universal suffrage, wanting to limit voting to those who were literate.

During Reconstruction and Grant's presidency, Bowles expressed Liberal Republican opinions. Once he decided on amnesty and equality were the right path, he grew increasingly impatient with Congress failing to implement either. In the Republican he wrote, "This indifference of public men to their public character and their public duties, and in the interests of the people is a sign of poison at the root." To Bowles there was only one solution—changing the leadership of the Republican party and the nation. Bowles played a major role in shaping what became Liberal Republican policies, along with identifying strategies and gaining support for a third party. With three other newspaper editors—Murat Halstead of the Cincinnati Commercial, Horace White of the Chicago Tribune, and Henry Watterson of the Louisville Courier-Journal—Bowles was part of the "Quadralateral" that tried unsuccessfully to secure Charles Francis Adams the nomination for president rather than Ulysses Grant. Although cautioned that his anti-Grant position could hurt the Republican's circulation, Bowles was undeterred, remaining anti-administration once Grant was president. In 1872, the Republican supported Horace Greeley for president. In the disputed election of 1876, the paper favored the claims of Samuel J. Tilden, the reform candidate who won the popular vote but lost the Electoral College.

When "partisan fanaticism" slowed national progress, Bowles declared his paper independent of political parties. He stuck to these policies moving forward, pioneering today's independent journalism. He also advocated for "honest money" in government and public office, and tried to expose corruption. He wrote a scathing editorial about robber baron and Erie Railroad director James Fisk. Almost proving Bowles' word, Fisk used his "Tammany Hall henchmen" to arrest Bowles on trumped-up charges when he was visiting New York City. Bowles spent time in jail, and when he returned home to Springfield, he wrote about Fisk again. Later on, the Republican accused railroad builder and politician Willis Phelps of being a "public robber and corrupter", as well as the "Boss Tweed of Springfield". In 1875, Phelps filed a libel suit against the Republican, asking for $200,000 in damages. Fortunately for Bowles, the juryless trial was adjudicated by Judge Endicott who essentially agreed with Bowles; he assessed damages of just $100. Bowles "became a hero to most of America's newspaper editors as a champion of a free press."

Bowles wrote, "American journalism is not content to be just mere journalism, a mere historian of the day. It intrudes into other spheres; it preaches, it teaches, it legislates, it reforms. It is not content with reporting what the public mind is thinking about; it insists that the public mind shall think about the right things." Thus, Bowles considered the editorial to be as important as the news to the Republican. However, Bowles also revealed his limitations through his editorials. One modern critic notes, "Profound analysis was beyond him, he was incapable of elaborate or subtle thinking upon abstract topics. and his knowledge showed the deficiencies of a man who had never studied systematically and had read few books. He wrote for the crowd, not for the cultured few."

== Travel writings ==
During the winter of 1844 and 1845, Bowles's health declined, and he went to the warmth of the South to recover. He extended his stay in New Orleans where he wrote a series of fifteen letters describing his travel experiences. These were published in the Republican and were very popular.

In 1865, Bowles made a journey from Kansas City to the Pacific coast and again sent letters describing his travels to Springfield. These were published in the Republican and were also edited into a nationally bestselling book, Across the Continent: A Summer 's Journey to the Rocky Mountains, the Mormons, and the Pacific States with Speaker Colfax (1865). As the title suggests, Bowles's traveling companion was Schyler Colfax, Speaker of the House of Representatives. Other members of their party included journalists from the Chicago Tribune and the New York Tribune. Although his series suggests that Bowles was following the popular trend for newspapers to "educate and entertain their readers with scenes of adventure in the West", Bowles had something else in mind. He later explained that this group wanted to use their respective platforms "to generate informed public interest in the West, to encourage economic development and investment, and to address escalating public issues such as national policies toward Mormons, Native Americans, and the transcontinental railroad." To do this, Bowles did not submit the usual articles from a corresponding journalist, but rather used the more personal approach of a letter or an epistolary, addressing his readership with purposeful intent. One reviewer said, the book includes "keen observation and graphic, incisive style". But from another perspective, Bowles also reflected prejudices toward Chinese, Native Americans, and Mormons that were common in his time.

In 1869, Bowles traveled to Colorado, resulting in another book, The Switzerland of America: A Summer Vacation in the Parks and Mountains of Colorado (1869). Beginning in 1869, the publisher Harford condensed and serialized the two books into Our New West: Records of the Travel Between the Mississippi River and the Pacific Ocean, which was sold by subscription. In 1869, Bowles' book The Pacific Railroad Open, How to Go, What to See collected his articles that had previously appeared in the Atlantic Monthly. When his health declined in his later years, Bowles traveled to Europe in for seven months in 1862, returning in 1870, 1871, and 1874; the result was more travel articles for the Republican.

== Emily Dickinson ==
Bowles had a strong friendship with Susan and Austin Dickinson and frequently visited The Evergreens, their home in Amherst, Massachusetts. Apparently, Bowles found The Evergreens a refuge during his bouts of illness and when he was attending trustee meetings for Amherst College. Of Bowles, Susan Dickinson wrote, "His range of topics was unlimited, now some plot of local politics, rousing his honest rage, now some rare effusion of fine sentiment over an unpublished poem which he would draw from his pocket, having received it in advance from the fascinated editor." Poet Emily Dickinson met Bowles at her brother's home. They shared common interests as reformers, both supporting ending slavery and suffrage for women. Subsequently, Dickinson wrote Bowles at least fifty letters, mostly between 1861 and 1862. Dickinson also sent some forty poems to Bowles, making him one of the most important recipients of her work. Bowles did publish some of Dickinson's poems in the Republican, but never any that she sent to him through these private correspondences.

Some scholars believe Bowles was Dickinson's infamous secret love interest; others consider him a confidant and publisher of her poetry. Richard Sewall, a Dickinson biographer wrote, "She was in deeply in love with him for several years and never ceased loving him at a distance for the rest of her life." However, John McDermott says Dickinson's letters to Bowles "do not suggest intimacy at all. Instead, they reveal a pattern that might be expected between friends (equals), but also a more formal, advisory nature". Regardless, the relationship between Bowles and Dickinson was complex; the two had a falling out in 1863 that lasted eleven years, despite the fact that he still visited her brother next door. Their conflict finally ended when her father, Edward, died in 1874. Other than family members, Bowles was the only person Dickinson spoke to at her father's funeral. She then broke the gap in their correspondence, sending a letter to thank Bowles for his kindness at the time of her father's death.

In 1875, Dickinson wrote Bowles again, saying, "We miss your vivid Face and the besetting Accents, you bring from Numidian Haunts." With her reference to Africa (Numidia), Dickinson is referencing Bowles' recent trip to the South—Washington, D.C. to be exact—where Bowles had gone to follow contentious Congressional discussions about the Force Bill which allowed the government to use force to protect African American politicians and voters from violence and intimidation. Bowles also liked to visit the warmer climate of Washington during the winters of Massachusetts. Therefore, this comment is an inside joke and also an indication that the two enjoyed political discourse.

Annually, Bowles sent flowers to the Dickinson family on the anniversary of Edward Dickinson's death.

== Personal ==
On September 6, 1848, Bowles married Mary Sandford Dwight Schermerhorn of Geneva, New York. Her grandfather, James S. Dwight, was a leading merchant in Springfield in the early 19th century. They had seven children. Bowles always regretted not attending college and, therefore, educated his children. His son Samuel Bowles IV attended Yale University and the University of Berlin, after traveling abroad for two years. Bowles' daughter Ruth Standish Bowles married William Henry Baldwin Jr., president of the Long Island Rail Road.

Bowles was driven but was described as intense, combative, and erratic. He was a perfectionist who could alienate people with his tactlessness and "unreserved criticism;" yet he "rarely admitted error" and was considered thin-skinned when it came to criticism about the Republican or himself. However, he could also be charming—Henry L Dawes wrote, "I never knew a man who knew him, who wouldn't rather have him at his table than any other man in the world." Susan Dickinson noted that Bowles' presence at her home "seemed to enrich and widen all life for us, a creator of endless perspectives".

Although he typically worked twelve to sixteen hours a day, Bowles also demonstrated a "nervousness" and was prone to periods of illness. He had a "nervous breakdown" in 1844 after putting too much energy into his daily newspaper start-up. Going on what he called a "tour for health", was a pattern throughout his adult life. In addition to his 1844–45 trip to the South, he took a six-month tour in 1862 to "restore his nervous system". One-time co-owner and editor of the Springfield Republication, Josiah Holland wrote, "The sparkle, the vivacity, the drive, the power of the Republican, cost life." Bowles was in poor health for the last twenty years of his life, suffering from dyspepsia, headaches, insomnia, neuralgia; he continued to seek the curative benefits of travel. He had a major stroke in December 1877, resulting in some paralysis.

Late in life, Bowles' commitment to being independent of outside influences impacted his family relationships. In 1874, he opposed his brother-in-law Henry Alexander Jr.'s run for the United States Congress because he did not think Alexander's health could take the stress. This resulted in "permanent family estrangement". In 1875, he wrote a letter firing his younger brother, Benjamin Franklin Bowles who managed the newspaper's counting room well but not to Bowles exacting standard. Benjamin was deeply hurt and moved to Paris where he died the next year. In 1878, Bowles died from a stroke in Springfield without reconciling with either sibling. Emily Dickinson was one of the numerous mourners at his funeral.

After his death, Bowles' son, Samuel IV became publisher and editor-in-chief of the Republican. In 1884, Bowles IV married Elizabeth Hoar. They had two sons: Samuel Bowles V, who became a journalist in Boston, and Sherman Bowles, who joined a newspaper in Philadelphia and took over the Republican when his father died.
