= Robert Strong Woodward House and Studio =

Historic house in Massachusetts, United States

- U.S. National Register of Historic Places
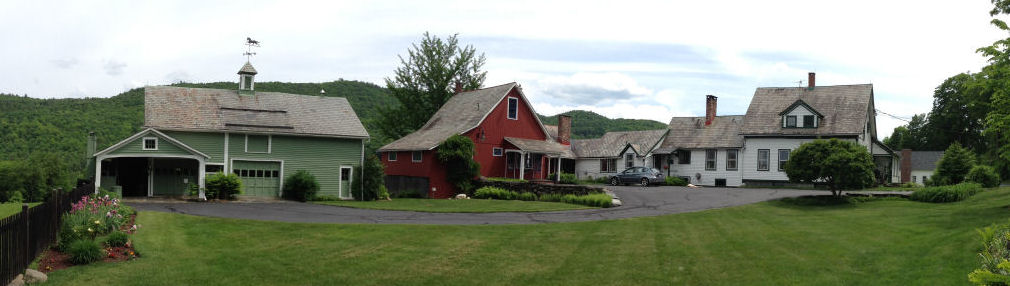

- Location within Massachusetts Location within the United States
- Location: 43 Upper St. Buckland, Massachusetts
- Coordinates: 42°35′21.7″N 72°47′40″W
- Area: 16 acres (6.5 ha)
- Built: 1850
- Architect: Taylor, Joseph
- Architectural style: Gothic Revival
- NRHP reference No.: 100001961
- Added to NRHP: January 11, 2018

The Robert Strong Woodward House and Studio is a historic property at 43 Upper Street in Buckland, Massachusetts. Built about 1850, it was the home and studio of prominent New England landscape artist Robert Strong Woodward from 1936 until his death in 1957. The property has been maintained virtually intact except for maintenance and minor alterations since his death. It was listed on the National Register of Historic Places in 2018.

== Description and history ==
The Robert Strong Woodward property is located on the southern fringe of the village center of Buckland, on the east side of Upper Street, roughly opposite the Maj. Joseph Griswold House. The property is 16 acres (6.5 ha) in size, offering views across the local valley to the nearby hills. The property's built infrastructure includes a house, barn, and a number of once independent outbuildings which have been joined to the house. The outbuildings include a former blacksmith shop, chicken coop, and carriage house. Woodward's studio, located in the former blacksmith shop, is sited at the eastern end of the complex, where its southeast orientation affords good views.

The house was built about 1850 by Joseph Taylor, and is adorned with modest elements of Victorian Gothic trim. The property was purchased in 1883 by Henry Southwick, the town blacksmith. It was here that he (and afterward his son) carried on that business. In 1934 Robert Strong Woodward purchased the property. Woodward, a paraplegic due to an accident with a revolver when he was 21 years old. He made significant changes to the property to accommodate his wheelchair, moving the chicken coop to close a gap between the house and the blacksmith shop. The blacksmith shop and carriage house were moved a short distance to be directly next to each other, and the barn was moved from the south side of the house to the north, in order to provide an unobstructed view down the valley. In fact, moving the barn and chicken coop gave the entire south side of the house, from his bedroom to studio balcony a vantage point from which to paint. The studio has been maintained in virtually the same condition since Woodward's death in 1957 by the recipient of his estate.

== See also ==
- National Register of Historic Places listings in Franklin County, Massachusetts
