= South School =

South School may refer to:

in the United States

- South School (Torrington, Connecticut), listed on the National Register of Historic Places (NRHP)
- South School (Shutesbury, Massachusetts), listed on the NRHP
- South School (Stoneham, Massachusetts), listed on the NRHP
- South School (Yellow Springs, Ohio), listed on the NRHP
- South School (Reedsburg, Wisconsin), listed on the Wisconsin Register of Historic Places
- South School (Stoughton, Wisconsin), listed on the NRHP
