= North Leverett, Massachusetts =

- North Leverett Historic District
- U.S. National Register of Historic Places
- U.S. Historic district
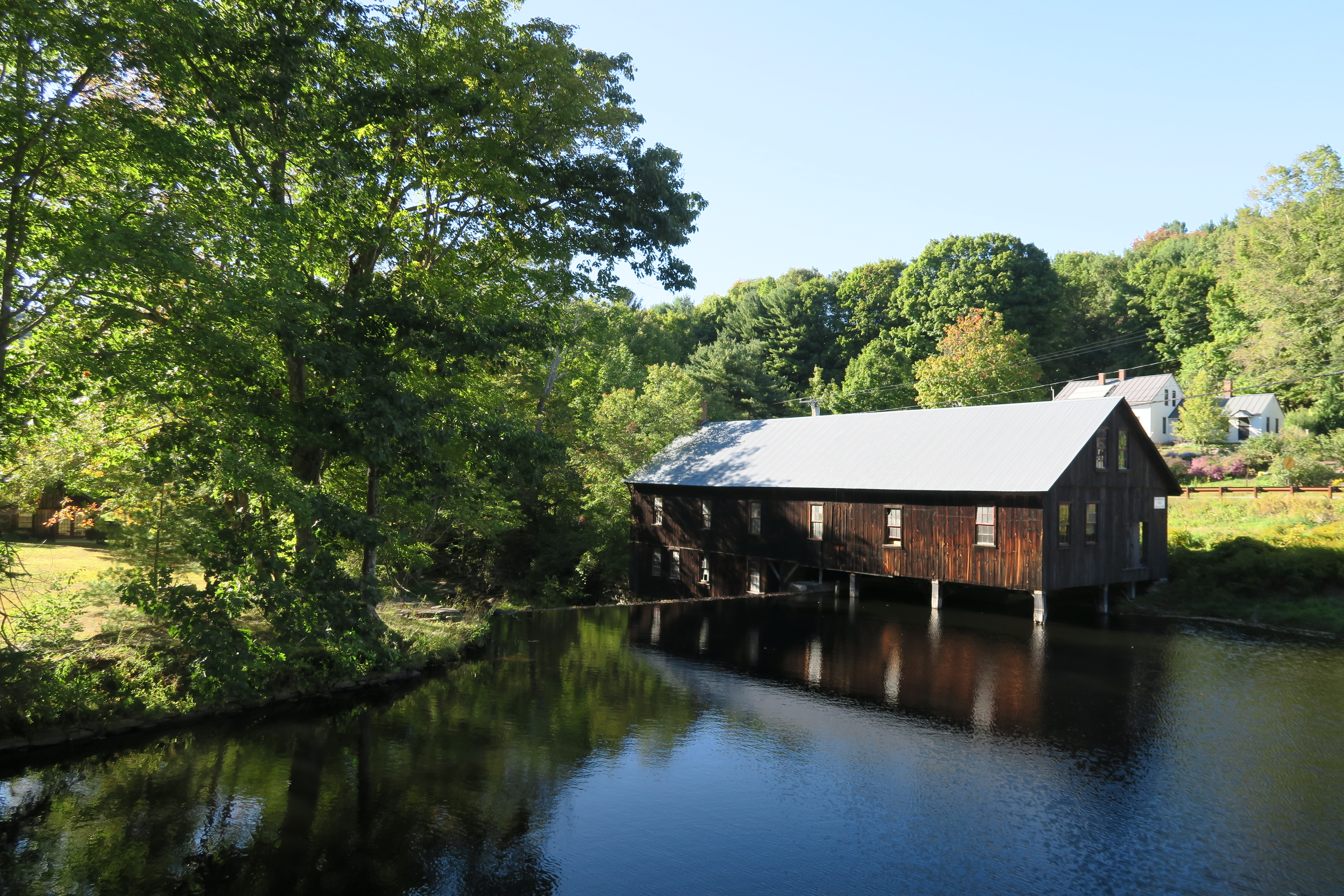
- Slarrow's Mill

- Location within Massachusetts Location within the United States
- Location: North Leverett, Chestnut Hill, Cave Hill, Jackson Hill, Hemenway & Dickinson Rds., Leverett, Massachusetts
- Coordinates: 42.5079°N 72.492°W
- Area: 245 acres (99 ha)
- NRHP reference No.: 14000326
- Added to NRHP: June 13, 2014

North Leverett is a historic mill village of Leverett, Massachusetts. Centered on the intersection of North Leverett Road with Chestnut Hill Road and Cave Hill Road it includes predominantly residential buildings that were built during the height of the area's industrial activity between the 1770s and mid-19th century. The architecture is mainly Federal and Greek Revival in style, including the 1832 North Leverett Baptist Church. The Slarrow Mill is the only remaining component of the village's industrial past. The village was listed as a historic district on the National Register of Historic Places in 2014.

The town of Leverett was first settled in the mid-18th century, and was incorporated (by separation from Sunderland) in 1774. North Leverett was the site of an early inn (no longer standing) operated by Richard Montague, one of the first settlers. The soil in Leverett was too poor to support market-based agriculture, and the Sawmill River was seen as a good source of water power for industrial use. Joseph Slarrow, another early settler, purchased land on the river in North Leverett, and established the sawmill that still stands today. By the mid-19th century, the village was the most substantial industrial center in the entire town, producing lumber, shingles, and scythes. Industry declined in the early 20th century, and now only archaeological remains and the Slarrow mill survive as a reminder of that activity.

== See also ==
- Leverett Center Historic District
- East Leverett Historic District
- Moore's Corner Historic District
- National Register of Historic Places listings in Franklin County, Massachusetts
