= National Register of Historic Places listings in Franklin County, Massachusetts =

Location of Franklin County in Massachusetts

This is a list of the National Register of Historic Places listings in Franklin County, Massachusetts.

This is intended to be a complete list of the properties and districts on the National Register of Historic Places in Franklin County, Massachusetts, United States. Latitude and longitude coordinates are provided for many National Register properties and districts; these locations may be seen together in a map.

There are 61 properties and districts listed on the National Register in the county, including 1 National Historic Landmark.

Contents: Counties in Massachusetts

Barnstable | Berkshire | Bristol | Dukes | Essex | Franklin | Hampden | Hampshire | Middlesex | Nantucket | Norfolk | Plymouth | Suffolk | Worcester

This National Park Service list is complete through NPS recent listings posted January 30, 2026.

== Current listings ==
	Name on the Register	Image	Date listed	Location	City or town	Description
1	Simeon Alexander Jr. House	Simeon Alexander Jr. House	May 28, 1991 (#91000598)	496 Millers Falls Rd. 42°38′19″N 72°27′55″W	Northfield	
2	Alvah Stone Mill	Alvah Stone Mill	June 30, 1997 (#97000562)	440 Greenfield Rd. 42°32′16″N 72°32′20″W	Montague	Now the Bookmill.
3	Ashfield Plain Historic District	Ashfield Plain Historic District	September 20, 1991 (#91001373)	Roughly along Main and South Sts. and adjacent parts of Buckland and Norton Hill Rds. 42°31′37″N 72°47′17″W	Ashfield	
4	Bardwell's Ferry Bridge	Bardwell's Ferry Bridge	February 10, 2000 (#00000076)	Bardwell's Ferry Rd. over the Deerfield River; 42°33′20″N 72°40′41″W	Conway	
5	Benson's New Block and the Mohawk Chambers	Benson's New Block and the Mohawk Chambers	March 11, 2014 (#14000046)	136-138 & 130-134 Main St. & 11 Wells St. 42°35′17″N 72°36′14″W	Greenfield	
6	Bernardston Congregational Unitarian Church	Bernardston Congregational Unitarian Church	March 18, 1993 (#93000128)	Junction of Church and Depot Sts. 42°40′14″N 72°33′00″W	Bernardston	
7	Bissell Bridge	Bissell Bridge	February 26, 2004 (#04000083)	Heath Rd., MA 8A over Mill Brook; 42°37′57″N 72°52′10″W	Charlemont	
8	Burkeville Covered Bridge	Burkeville Covered Bridge	September 9, 1988 (#88001456)	Main Poland Rd. over the South River; 42°30′28″N 72°42′40″W	Conway	
9	Charlemont Village Historic District	Charlemont Village Historic District	February 10, 1988 (#87001880)	MA 2 (Main St.) between South and Harmont Sts. 42°37′40″N 72°52′27″W	Charlemont	
10	Colrain Center Historic District	Colrain Center Historic District	November 15, 2006 (#06001057)	Main, Greenfield, and Jacksonville Rds., Streeter Ln., and River and Coburn Sts. 42°40′24″N 72°41′52″W	Colrain	
11	Conway Center Historic District	Conway Center Historic District	September 10, 1999 (#99001043)	5-38 Academy Hill Rd., 1-59 Elm St., and 8-98 Main St. 42°30′31″N 72°41′50″W	Conway	
12	Dedic Site	Dedic Site	July 16, 1980 (#80000504)	Address Restricted	Deerfield	Clovis-era paleo-indian site
13	Deerfield Valley Agricultural Society Fairgrounds	Deerfield Valley Agricultural Society Fairgrounds	May 11, 2011 (#11000267)	Park St. 42°37′51″N 72°52′03″W	Charlemont	
14	East Charlemont District School	East Charlemont District School	March 7, 2017 (#100000721)	1811 MA 2; 42°37′25″N 72°47′12″W	Charlemont	
15	East Hawley Center Historic District	East Hawley Center Historic District	July 24, 1992 (#92000951)	East Hawley, Plainfield, Buckland, and Ashfield Rds. 42°33′48″N 72°52′43″W	Hawley	
16	East Leverett Historic District	East Leverett Historic District	January 29, 2014 (#13001131)	Shutesbury, January Hills, Still Corner & Cushman Rds. 42°26′18″N 72°28′58″W	Leverett	
17	East Main-High Street Historic District	East Main-High Street Historic District	March 16, 1989 (#88002011)	Roughly bounded by Church, High, E. Main, and Franklin Sts. 42°35′20″N 72°35′49″W	Greenfield	
18	Franklin County Fairgrounds	Franklin County Fairgrounds	June 15, 2011 (#11000359)	89 Wisdom Way; 42°34′44″N 72°36′42″W	Greenfield	
19	Garden Theater Block	Garden Theater Block	September 1, 1983 (#83000591)	353-367 Main St. 42°35′15″N 72°36′01″W	Greenfield	
20	Gill Center Historic District	Gill Center Historic District	November 5, 2018 (#100003068)	Center, Main, Cross, Boyle, River, & Lyons Hill Rds. 42°38′28″N 72°29′58″W	Gill	
21	Maj. Joseph Griswold House	Maj. Joseph Griswold House	February 23, 1972 (#72000130)	Upper St. 42°35′26″N 72°47′39″W	Buckland	
22	Heath Center Historic District	Heath Center Historic District	October 25, 2007 (#07001103)	E. and W. Main Sts., 12 and 23 Avery Brook, 8 Taylor Brook, 1-51 Bray, Colrain Stage, 3-16 Ledges, and 15-48 South Rds. 42°40′25″N 72°49′19″W	Heath	
23	Hill Cemetery and Parson Hubbard House Historic District	Hill Cemetery and Parson Hubbard House Historic District	August 23, 2006 (#06000716)	Old Village Rd., 72 Old Village Rd. 42°35′54″N 72°41′16″W	Shelburne	
24	King Philip's Hill	King Philip's Hill	December 16, 1981 (#81000106)	Old Bernardston Road; 42°41′02″N 72°28′35″W	Northfield	
25	Leavitt-Hovey House	Leavitt-Hovey House	December 22, 1983 (#83003977)	402 Main St. 42°35′17″N 72°35′58″W	Greenfield	
26	Leverett Center Historic District	Leverett Center Historic District	December 5, 2008 (#08001127)	Amherst, Montague, Depot, and Shutesbury Rds. 42°27′05″N 72°30′06″W	Leverett	
27	Long Plain Cemetery	Long Plain Cemetery	June 29, 2020 (#100005304)	19 Depot Rd. 42°27′04″N 72°31′30″W	Leverett	Long Plain Cemetery is also known as Hillsboro Cemetery.
28	Main Street Historic District	Main Street Historic District	October 13, 1988 (#88001908)	Main St. between Chapman and Hope Sts., also along Bank Row; 42°35′13″N 72°36′05″W	Greenfield	
29	Millers Falls Village Historic District	Millers Falls Village Historic District	November 22, 2021 (#100007171)	Roughly bounded by Bridge, Church, Crescent, East Main, and West Main Sts. 42°34′43″N 72°29′41″W	Montague	
30	Mohawk Trail	Mohawk Trail	April 3, 1973 (#73000283)	Along the bank of the Cold River; 42°38′15″N 72°57′13″W	Charlemont	Extends into Florida and Savoy in Berkshire County
31	Montague Center Historic District	Montague Center Historic District	November 16, 2001 (#01001236)	Center, Main, North, School, and Union Sts. 42°32′06″N 72°32′05″W	Montague	
32	Moore's Corner Historic District	Moore's Corner Historic District	May 19, 2014 (#14000215)	North Leverett, Dudleyville, Rattlesnake Gutter & Church Hill Rds. 42°29′40″N 72°28′06″W	Leverett	
33	New Salem Common Historic District	New Salem Common Historic District	April 12, 1978 (#78000443)	S. Main St. 42°29′55″N 72°19′54″W	New Salem	
34	Newton Street School	Newton Street School	October 27, 1988 (#88001907)	70 Shelburne Rd. 42°35′08″N 72°36′52″W	Greenfield	
35	North Cemetery	North Cemetery	July 1, 2020 (#100005276)	114 Montague Rd. 42°28′03″N 72°29′54″W	Leverett	
36	North Leverett Historic District	North Leverett Historic District	June 13, 2014 (#14000326)	North Leverett, Chestnut Hill, Cave Hill, Jackson Hill, Hemenway & Dickinson Rds. 42°30′28″N 72°29′31″W	Leverett	
37	Northfield Center Cemetery	Northfield Center Cemetery	November 13, 2004 (#04001220)	Western terminus of Parker Ave. 42°41′41″N 72°27′40″W	Northfield	
38	Northfield Main Street Historic District	Northfield Main Street Historic District	July 8, 1982 (#82004965)	Full length of Main St. from Millers Brook to Pauchaug Brook; 42°41′50″N 72°27′16″W	Northfield	
39	Odd Fellows' Hall	Odd Fellows' Hall	May 10, 1979 (#79000345)	1-5 State St. 42°36′13″N 72°44′29″W	Buckland	In Shelburne Falls village of Buckland.
40	Old Deerfield Village Historic District	Old Deerfield Village Historic District	October 15, 1966 (#66000774)	West of U.S. Route 5, bounded by Mill Village Rd., "The Street", Broughton's Pond Rd., and Pogues Hole Rd. 42°33′04″N 72°36′30″W	Deerfield	
41	Orange Armory	Orange Armory	August 27, 2020 (#100005477)	135 East Main St. 42°35′24″N 72°18′13″W	Orange	
42	Orange Center Historic District	Orange Center Historic District	April 27, 1989 (#89000057)	Roughly N. and S. Main St. from Prospect St. to River St. 42°35′24″N 72°18′39″W	Orange	
43	Pine Street School	Pine Street School	March 13, 2002 (#02000156)	13 Pine St. 42°42′32″N 72°26′50″W	Northfield	
44	Powers Institute Historic District	Powers Institute Historic District	March 18, 1994 (#93000127)	Church St. between South and Library Sts. 42°40′16″N 72°33′12″W	Bernardston	
45	Riverside Archeological District	Riverside Archeological District	July 9, 1975 (#75000256)	Address Restricted	Greenfield and Gill	
46	Riverside Village Historic District	Riverside Village Historic District	September 18, 2017 (#100001617)	0-77 French King Hwy., 0-61 Riverview Dr., 1-9 Grove, 2-9 Myrtle, 8 Meadow, 2-23 Oak, 1-4 Pine & 3-32 Walnut Sts. 42°36′41″N 72°32′52″W	Gill	
47	Shelburne Falls Historic District	Shelburne Falls Historic District	January 28, 1988 (#87002548)	Bridge and State Sts. 42°36′11″N 72°44′25″W	Buckland and Shelburne	Boundary increase 2010 approved April 7, 2010): Roughly bounded by Deerfield River, Bridge St., Massachusetts Route 2 and Arms Cemetery
48	Shelburne Free Public Library	Shelburne Free Public Library	July 18, 2016 (#16000453)	233 Shelburne Center Rd. 42°35′20″N 72°41′19″W	Shelburne	
49	Arthur A. Smith Covered Bridge	Arthur A. Smith Covered Bridge	February 3, 1983 (#83000592)	West of Colrain on Lyonsville Rd. 42°40′12″N 72°43′09″W	Colrain	
50	South School	South School	December 26, 2007 (#07001312)	6 Schoolhouse Rd. 42°25′11″N 72°26′00″W	Shutesbury	
51	Sunderland Center Historic District	Sunderland Center Historic District	March 15, 2002 (#02000157)	Roughly along S. Main St.from Old Amherst Rd. to French's Ferry Rd. 42°27′59″N 72°34′47″W	Sunderland	
52	Old Tavern Farm	Old Tavern Farm	March 10, 2005 (#05000120)	817 Colrain Rd. 42°37′20″N 72°38′09″W	Greenfield	
53	Turners Falls Historic District	Turners Falls Historic District	May 2, 1982 (#82004966)	Roughly bounded by the Connecticut River, Power Canal, and 9th and L Sts. 42°36′30″N 72°33′23″W	Montague	Listed as Turner Falls Historic District
54	US Post Office-Greenfield Main	US Post Office-Greenfield Main	December 20, 1985 (#85003224)	442 Main St. 42°35′15″N 72°35′53″W	Greenfield	
55	Weldon Hotel	Weldon Hotel	August 6, 1980 (#80000503)	54 High St. 42°35′26″N 72°35′44″W	Greenfield	
56	Wendell Town Common Historic District	Wendell Town Common Historic District	May 21, 1992 (#92000580)	Junction of Depot, Lock's Village, Montague and Morse Village Rds. 42°32′55″N 72°23′51″W	Wendell	
57	West Whately Historic District	West Whately Historic District	October 10, 2003 (#03001018)	Address Restricted; 42°26′18″N 72°40′55″W	Whately	
58	Whately Center Historic District	Whately Center Historic District	September 11, 2003 (#03000920)	155-215 Chestnut Plain Rd. and 330-348 Haydenville Rd. 42°26′18″N 72°38′09″W	Whately	
59	Whitaker-Clary House	Whitaker-Clary House	June 18, 1975 (#75000257)	Elm St. 42°32′26″N 72°18′58″W	New Salem	Home of the Swift River Historical Society
60	The Wilder Homestead	The Wilder Homestead	January 24, 2011 (#10001178)	Ashfield Rd. 42°35′59″N 72°46′44″W	Buckland	About 1/4 mile south of the Upper Road/Ashfield Road junction.
61	Robert Strong Woodward House and Studio	Robert Strong Woodward House and Studio	January 11, 2018 (#100001961)	43 Upper St. 42°35′16″N 72°47′44″W	Buckland	

== See also ==
- List of National Historic Landmarks in Massachusetts
- National Register of Historic Places listings in Massachusetts
