= Deerfield Valley Agricultural Society Fairgrounds =

- U.S. National Register of Historic Places
- U.S. Historic district
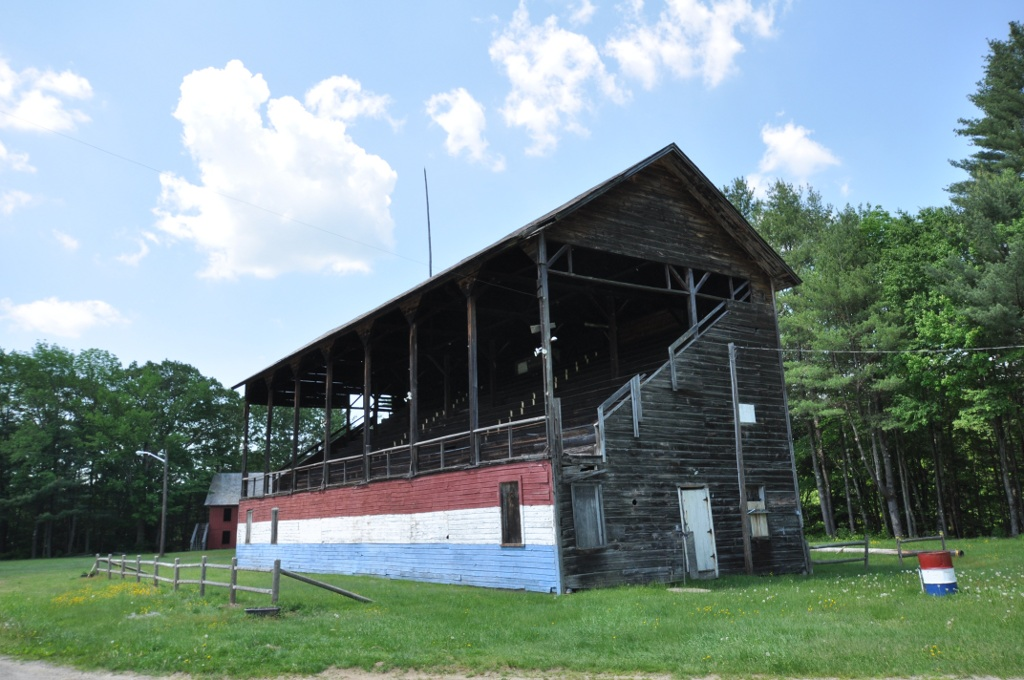
- Grandstand at the fairgrounds

- Location within Massachusetts Location within the United States
- Location: Park Road, Charlemont, Massachusetts
- Coordinates: 42°37′51″N 72°52′3″W
- Area: 24 acres (9.7 ha)
- Built: c. 1890
- NRHP reference No.: 11000267
- Added to NRHP: May 11, 2011

The former Deerfield Valley Agricultural Society Fairgrounds or Charlemont Fairgrounds, now known as Memorial Park, is a public park in Charlemont, Massachusetts, United States. The 24-acre (9.7 ha) property occupies a plateau above the town, and is reached via an access road (Park Road) from Massachusetts Route 8A near the Bissell Bridge. Now a passive recreation facility managed by the town, it is one of the least-altered 19th-century fairgrounds in the state, with a grandstand, exhibition building, and racetrack built in the late 19th century. The property was listed on the National Register of Historic Places in 2011.

== Description and history ==
Charlemont's Memorial Park is located a short way north of the village center, on an elevated plateau above Massachusetts Route 8A. It is a basically rectangular area, whose dominant feature is a racing oval that is about 1,000 feet (300 m) long and 400 feet (120 m) wide. The track is made of packed earth and is about 15 feet (4.6 m) wide. On the western side of the oval is the park's largest building, a wooden grandstand. The grandstand has fourteen rows of bleacher-style seating, set above an enclosed ground level that functioned originally as an exhibition space and dining hall. A period two-story exhibition building is located southwest of the track. Inside the oval stands a modern picnic pavilion.

The fairground was opened in 1871, and the fairs staged there were a vehicle by which agricultural practices and techniques could be shared within the regional farming community. The open areas of the grounds would have been packed with temporary structures housing all types of exhibitions, displays, and amusements. The exhibition hall was built about 1885, and the grandstand in 1892. The racing oval was enlarged twice; that in 1911 gave the track a length of 0.5 miles (0.80 km). The last fair was held on the grounds in 1934. It was occasionally used for a variety of large-scale public events thereafter, and the track was at one point used as a venue for demolition derbies. The town took ownership of the property in 1940, and has most recently adapted for use as a passive recreational facility.

== See also ==
- National Register of Historic Places listings in Franklin County, Massachusetts
