= New Salem Common Historic District =

Historic district in Massachusetts, United States

- U.S. National Register of Historic Places
- U.S. Historic district
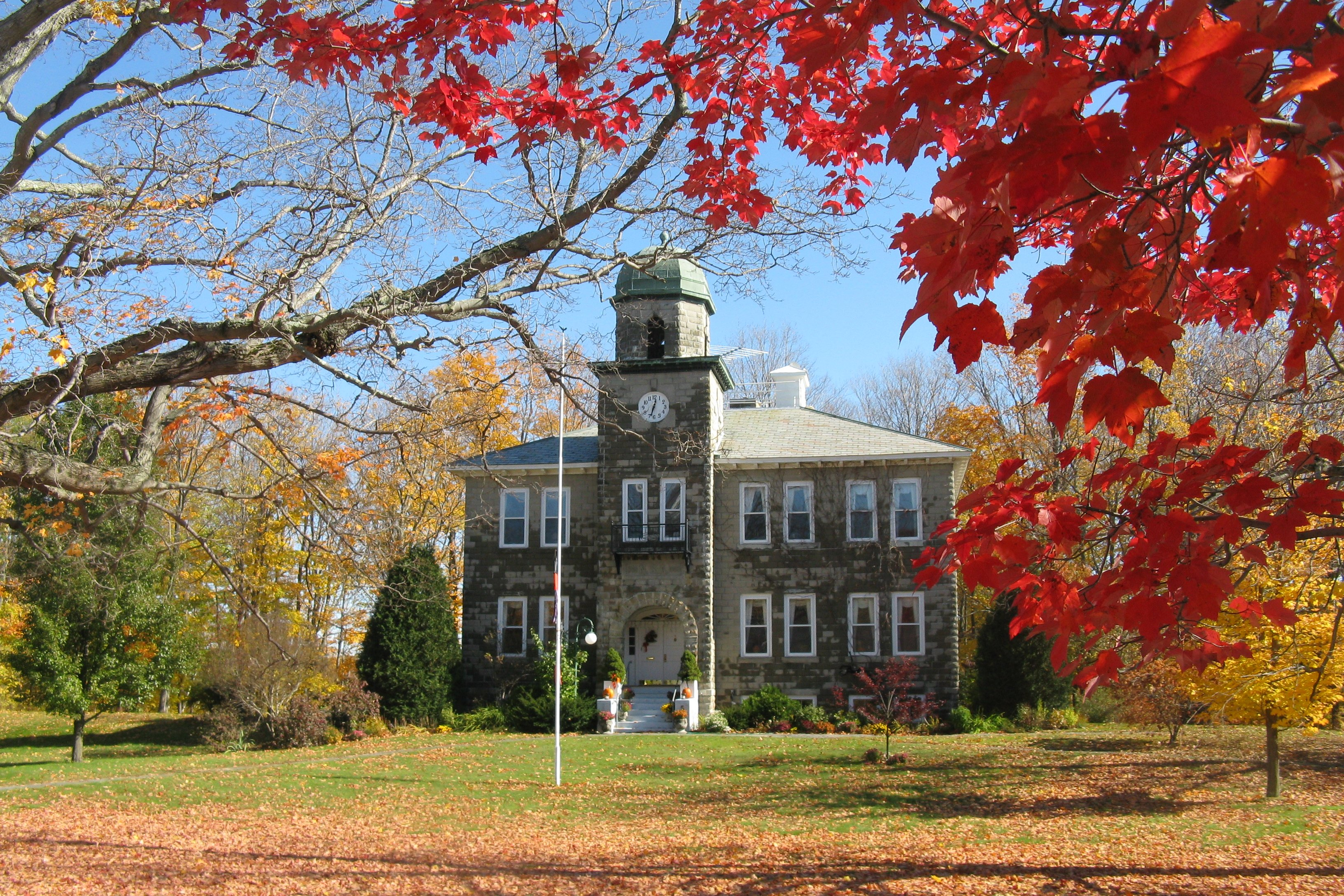
- New Salem Academy

- Location within Massachusetts Location within the United States
- Location: S. Main St., New Salem, Massachusetts
- Coordinates: 42°29′55″N 72°19′54″W
- Area: 35 acres (14 ha)
- Built: 1734
- NRHP reference No.: 78000443
- Added to NRHP: April 12, 1978

The New Salem Common Historic District encompasses the historic town center of New Salem, Massachusetts. Located on South Main Street, it includes the town common and most of its civic and institutional buildings. Most buildings in the district date to the 18th and 19th centuries. The district was listed on the National Register of Historic Places in 1978.

== Description and history ==
The land that now makes up New Salem was granted in 1734 to citizens of Salem, Massachusetts, and was settled in 1737. It flourished as a rural community based on lumber and agriculture, with the town center benefiting economically as a stagecoach stop on the route between Worcester and Brattleboro, Vermont. The town center was originally laid out in 1737, including a large common, of which the present two-acre common is a surviving remnant. Other early elements of the center include the town pound, a stone enclosure built to house stray livestock, and the cemetery. The town center was bypassed by the railroads in the 19th century, and the town subsequently stagnated economically and declined in population.

The historic district extends along South Main Street, from East and West Main Street in the north to Lovers Lane in the south. It is about 35 acres (14 ha) in size, with 43 historic buildings. Prominent among these are the First Congregational Church (1794), its 1838 and 1909 town halls, and the buildings of New Salem Academy, some of which date to the early 19th century. The common, in addition to several war memorials, includes a memorial to early settler William Stacy, who served in the American Revolutionary War and was an early settler of the Ohio Country.

== See also ==
- National Register of Historic Places listings in Franklin County, Massachusetts
- Whitaker-Clary House
