= Long Plain Cemetery =

Historic cemetery in Massachusetts, United States

- U.S. National Register of Historic Places
- Location within Massachusetts Location within the United States
- Location: 19 Depot Rd., Leverett, Massachusetts
- Coordinates: 42°27′4″N 72°31′30″W
- Area: 1 acre (0.40 ha)
- Built: c. 1781
- NRHP reference No.: 100005276
- Added to NRHP: July 1, 2020

Long Plain Cemetery is a historic cemetery at 19 Depot Road in Leverett, Massachusetts. The 1-acre (0.40 ha) cemetery is located on the south side of the street about 1.5 miles (2.4 km) west of Leverett center. The cemetery, whose oldest documented burials date to 1781, was listed on the National Register of Historic Places in 2020. Its burials include some of the town's early residents, and it remains in active use.

== Description and history ==
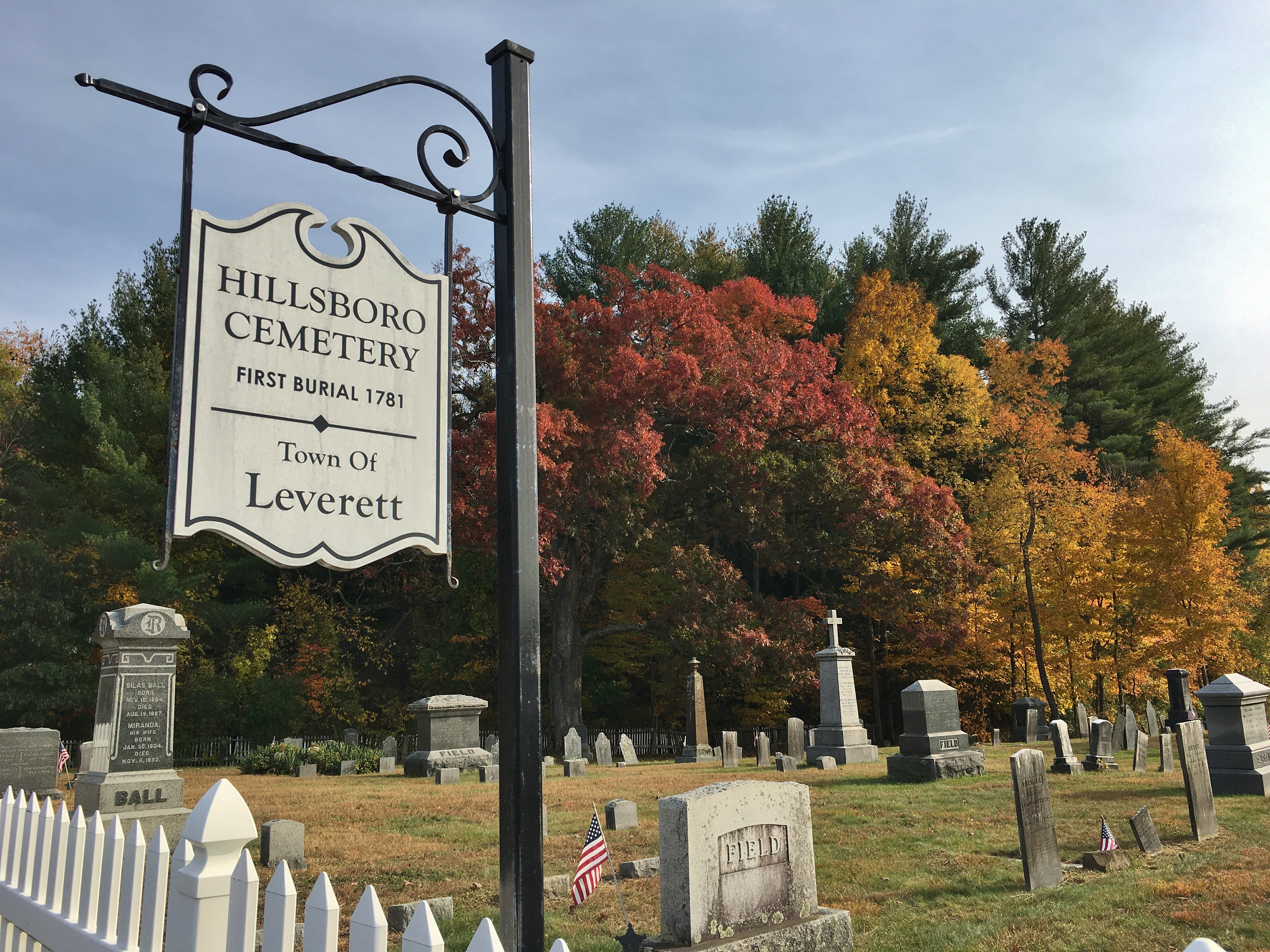

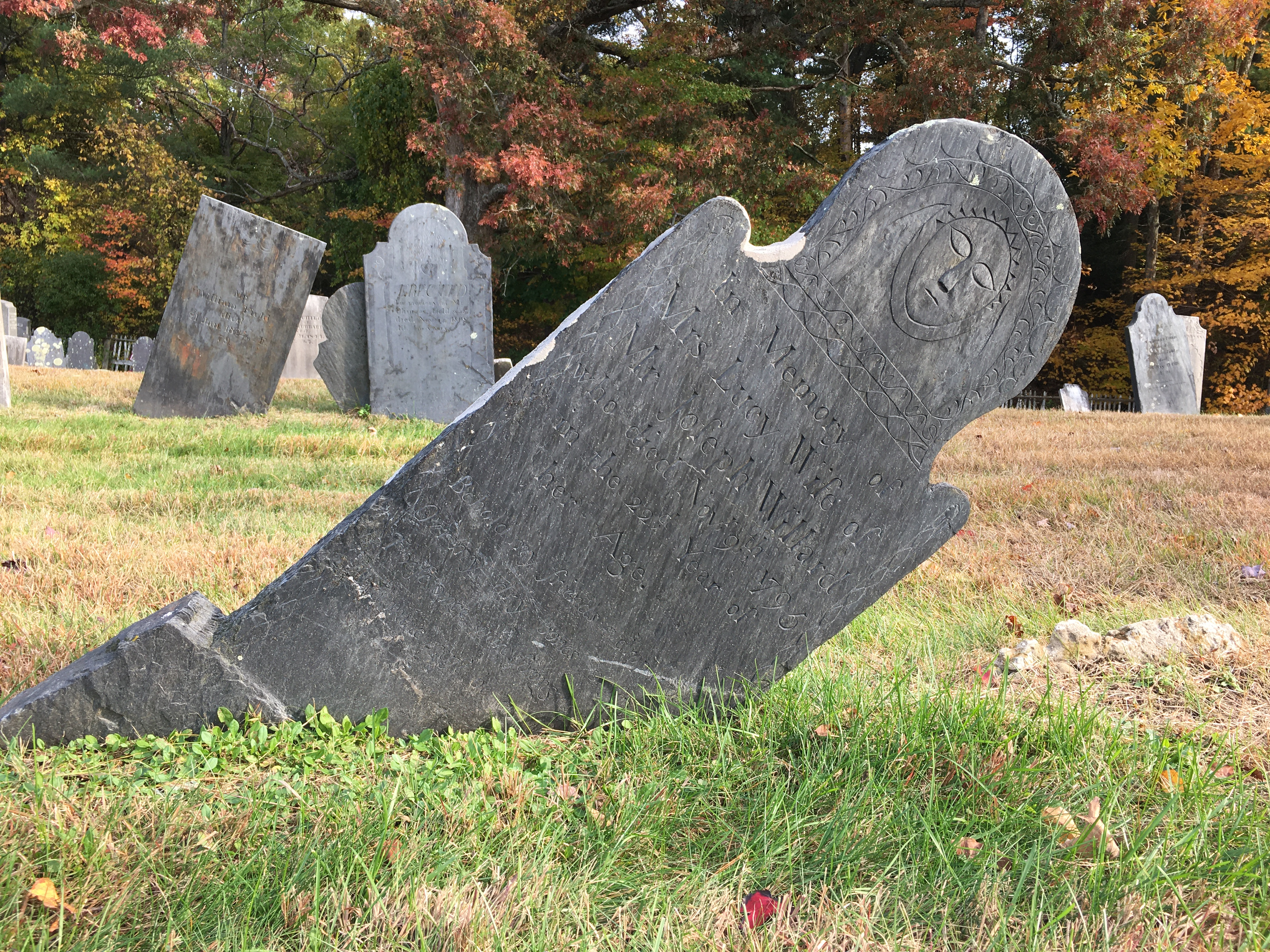

Long Plain Cemetery (also known as Hillsboro Cemetery) is located about 1.5 miles (2.4 km) west of the Leverett Center, the town's main village center, on the south side of Depot Road east of its junction with Long Plain Road. The 1-acre (0.40 ha) cemetery is roughly rectangular, with a picket fence around it. There is a vehicle gate near the western end of the cemetery, with a single lane providing access into its interior. Gravestones are generally set in rows, with the stones facing west. There are larger family plots near the cemetery's edges, and its oldest marked graves are on the eastern side.

Marked graves date from 1781 to the 2010s, and the cemetery continues in active use. Leverett was separated from Sunderland in 1774, and its establishment appears to date from that period. The oldest marked grave is that of Jonathan Field, one of the area's early settlers; it is possible that there are older unmarked graves as well. Significant burials, in addition to those of other early area settlers, include those of six of the town's Congregational ministers, and veterans of numerous military conflicts. The cemetery is presently owned and managed by the Leverett Cemetery Association, founded in 1910 to manage several of the town's older cemeteries.

== See also ==
- National Register of Historic Places listings in Franklin County, Massachusetts
