= Ashfield Plain Historic District =

Historic district in Massachusetts, United States

- U.S. National Register of Historic Places
- U.S. Historic district
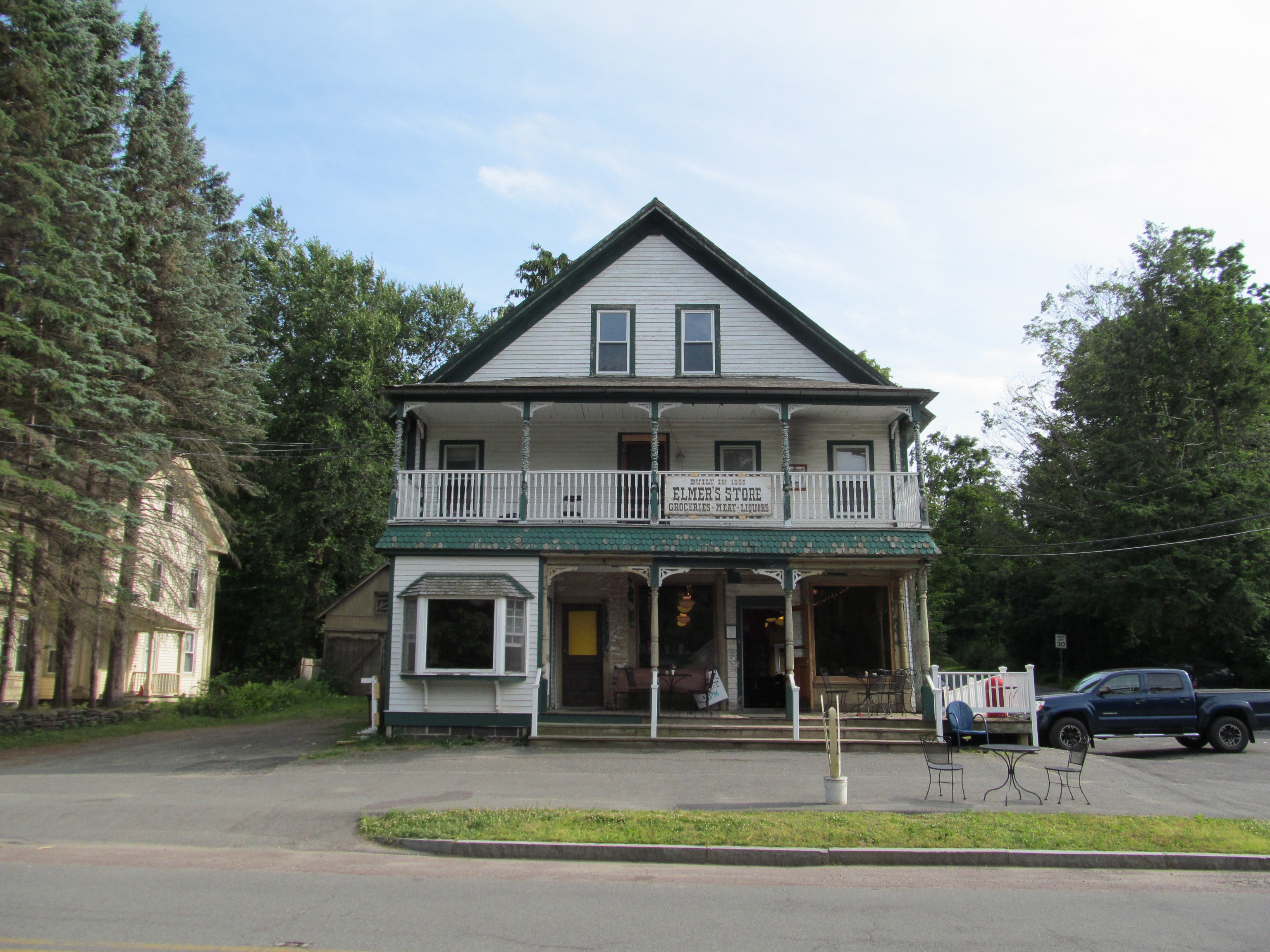
- Elmers Store on Main Street

- Location within Massachusetts Location within the United States
- Location: Roughly along Main and South Sts. and adjacent parts of Buckland and Norton Hill Rds., Ashfield, Massachusetts
- Coordinates: 42°31′37″N 72°47′17″W
- Area: 133 acres (54 ha)
- Built: 1812
- Architect: Lilly, Jonathan; Et al.
- Architectural style: Greek Revival, Late Victorian, Federal
- NRHP reference No.: 91001373
- Added to NRHP: September 20, 1991

The Ashfield Plain Historic District is a historic district roughly, along Main and South Streets and adjacent parts of Buckland and Norton Hill Roads in Ashfield, Massachusetts. It encompasses the village center of the town, which has acted as a civic and commercial center since the late 18th century. Its architectural heritage dates back to that time, but is now dominated by buildings from the late 19th and early 20th centuries. The district was listed on the National Register of Historic Places in 1991.

== Description and history ==
The town of Ashfield was settled in 1736 and incorporated in 1765. Its early town center was located at the northeast fringe of the present town center, but migrated toward "The Plain" where it is now later in the 18th century. This area, set on a relatively large level area (in otherwise hilly terrain) along the main road leading east toward the Connecticut River valley, was a natural place for taverns and other businesses to congregate. The town was economically dominated by agriculture, but small water-powered industries developed along the South River, which runs to the north of Main Street and was impounded by a dam in the early 19th century (forming Ashfield Great Pond) to facilitate those uses.

The historic district is essentially linear in character, extending along Main Street (Massachusetts Route 116) between Ashfield Lake in the west and Baptist Corner Road in the east, and then northward along Baptist Corner Road. It extends for short distances along some side roads, and along those two roads beyond their intersection to the east and south. It is 133 acres (54 ha) in size, and is composed mainly of one and two-story wood frame residences. The central core of the village includes a number of commercial buildings, all also of wood-frame construction, as well as most of the town's civic buildings. Among the buildings included in the district is Ashfield's Town Hall, which was built in the 1810s to house the First Congregational Church. While still in use by the congregation the building was moved 0.5 miles (0.80 km) down a steep hill to its present location. In 1870 the building was sold to the town, and adapted for use as town hall.

== See also ==
- National Register of Historic Places listings in Franklin County, Massachusetts
