= Sunderland Center Historic District =

Historic district in Massachusetts, United States

- U.S. National Register of Historic Places
- U.S. Historic district
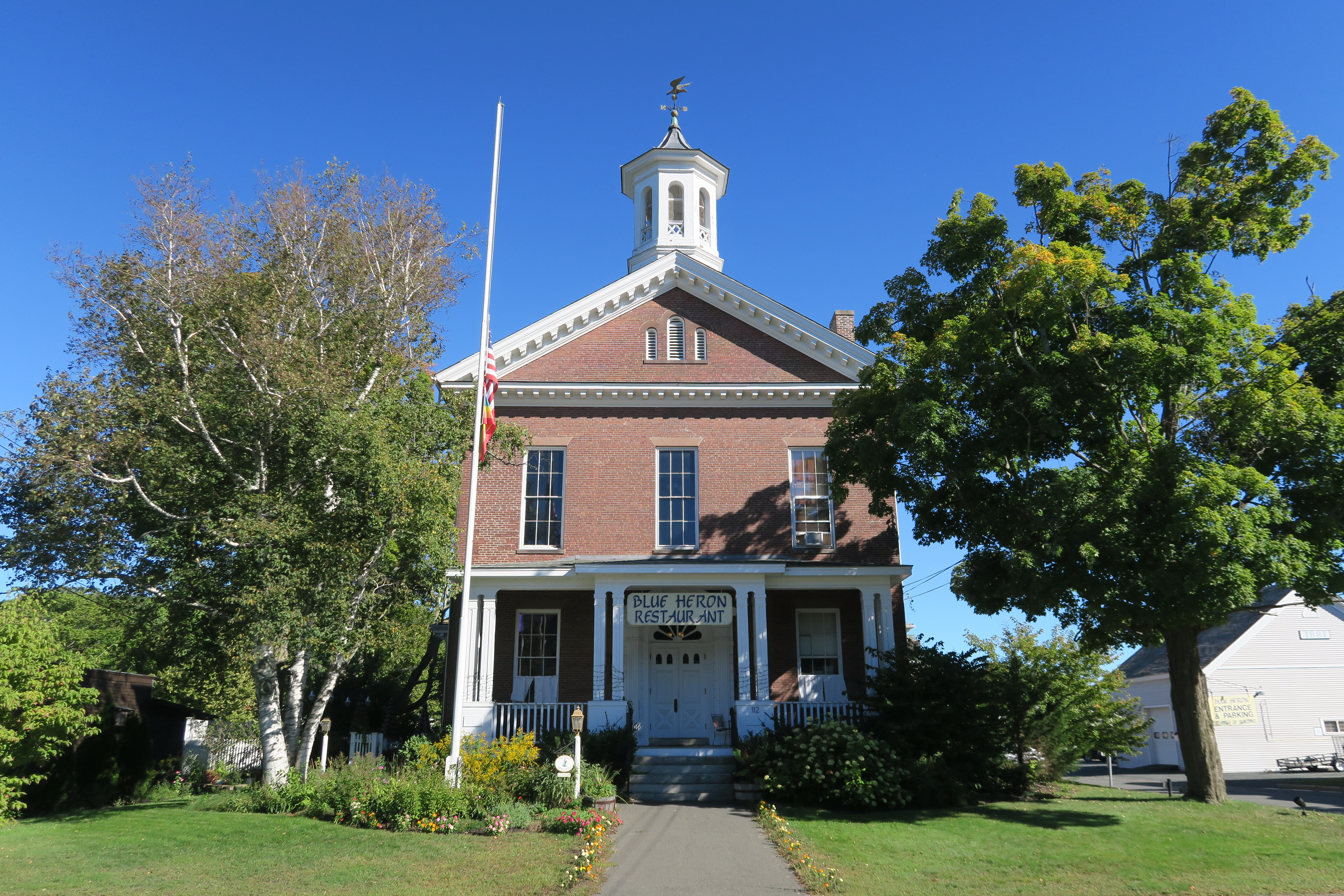
- Old Town Hall

- Location within Massachusetts Location within the United States
- Location: Roughly along S. Main St.from Old Amherst Rd. to French's Ferry Rd., Sunderland, Massachusetts
- Coordinates: 42.4675°N 72.5850°W
- Area: 108 acres (44 ha)
- Architect: Putnam, Karl Scott; Allen Bros.
- Architectural style: Georgian, Federal
- NRHP reference No.: 02000157
- Added to NRHP: March 15, 2002

The Sunderland Center Historic District encompasses the historic center of the farming town of Sunderland, Massachusetts, on the plains of the Connecticut River. The multi-acre district runs along North and South Main Street (Massachusetts Route 47), roughly from Old Amherst Road to North Silver Lane, and includes Bridge Street and the Sunderland Bridge across the river. The properties in the district largely still follow the plan of the town when it was first laid out in 1714. The predominant architectural style in the district is Greek Revival, but there are fine examples of Georgian and Federalist architecture, as well as a number of late 19th and early 20th century architectural styles. The district was listed on the National Register of Historic Places in 2002.

The area that became Sunderland was occupied by Native Americans until the 1670s, when it was purchased from them by English settlers; the single largest purchased traded much of the land for 80 fathoms of wampum. The settlement, known as Swampfield, was abandoned during King Philip's War (1675–78), and was not reestablished until 1714. At that time, Main Street was laid out along what had been a Native American trail, with a width of eight rods, and land parcels with frontage of fourteen rods were allotted to settlers. Land for the town cemetery was set aside, as was common land and a parcel for a minister. This basic plan is still visible in the lot divisions of the town center, although most of the lots have been divided, halving their frontage.

== See also ==
- National Register of Historic Places listings in Franklin County, Massachusetts
