= Benson's New Block and the Mohawk Chambers =

- U.S. National Register of Historic Places
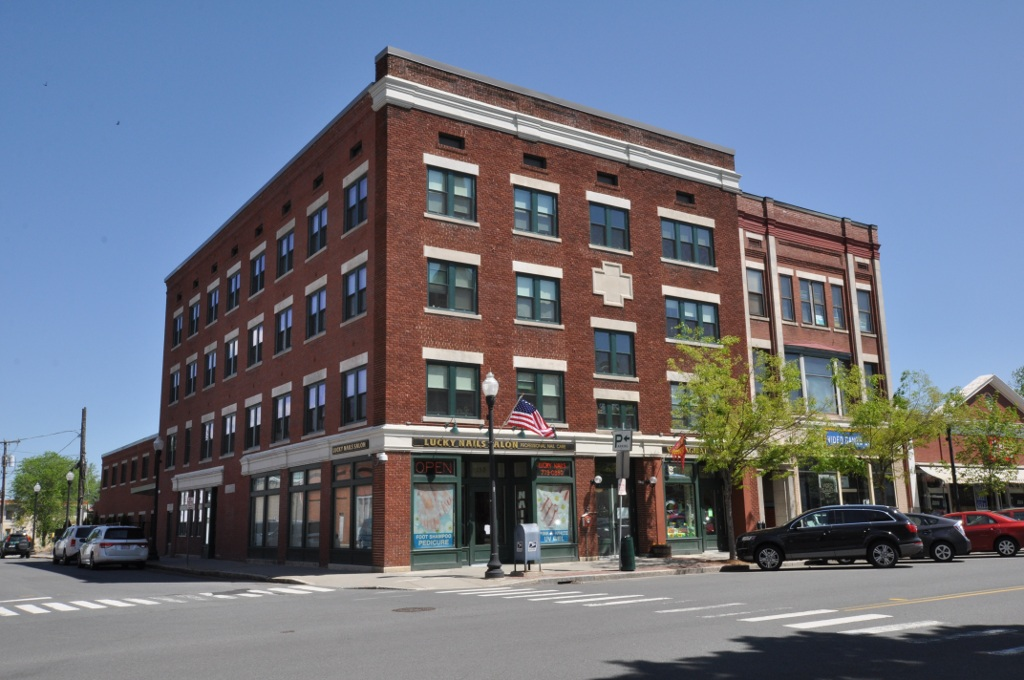

- Location within Massachusetts Location within the United States
- Location: 130-138 Main Street, 11 Wells Street, Greenfield, Massachusetts
- Coordinates: 42°35′17″N 72°36′14″W
- Built: 1913
- Built by: Thomas J. Gass
- Architectural style: Classical Revival
- NRHP reference No.: 14000046
- Added to NRHP: March 11, 2014

Benson's New Block and the Mohawk Chambers are a pair of mixed commercial and residential buildings at Main and Wells Streets in downtown Greenfield, Massachusetts. Built in 1913 and 1916, they are well-preserved and little-altered examples of period Neo-Classical commercial architecture. The buildings were listed on the National Register of Historic Places in 2014.

== Description and history ==
Benson's New Block and the Mohawk Chambers are located in downtown Greenfield. They stand side by side at the corner of Main and Wells Streets, facing Main Street. The righthand building, Benson's, is a three-story brick building built in 1916, and the left one is four stories, built in 1913. Both are built using steel frame construction, and are finished with Neoclassical brick and stone finishes. The Main Street facades have retail office spaces on the ground floor, with a cornice line separating that floor from the upper floors. The roofline of the Mohawk Chambers features a projecting cornice facing Main Street, which extends a short distance along the secondary Wells Street facade.

Both buildings were built by Thomas J. Gass, and originally housed commercial businesses on the first floor and residential apartments and rooming house space above. Gass was a noted local builder who also participated in the restoration of nearby Historic Deerfield. The Mohawk Chambers building housed the offices of W. Edward Benson, one of the city's major real estate developers and land speculators of the period. His activities included the construction of a number of new commercial buildings (including the adjacent Benson's New Block) in downtown Greenfield.

== See also ==
- National Register of Historic Places listings in Franklin County, Massachusetts
