= Simeon Alexander Jr. House =

Historic house in Massachusetts, United States

- U.S. National Register of Historic Places
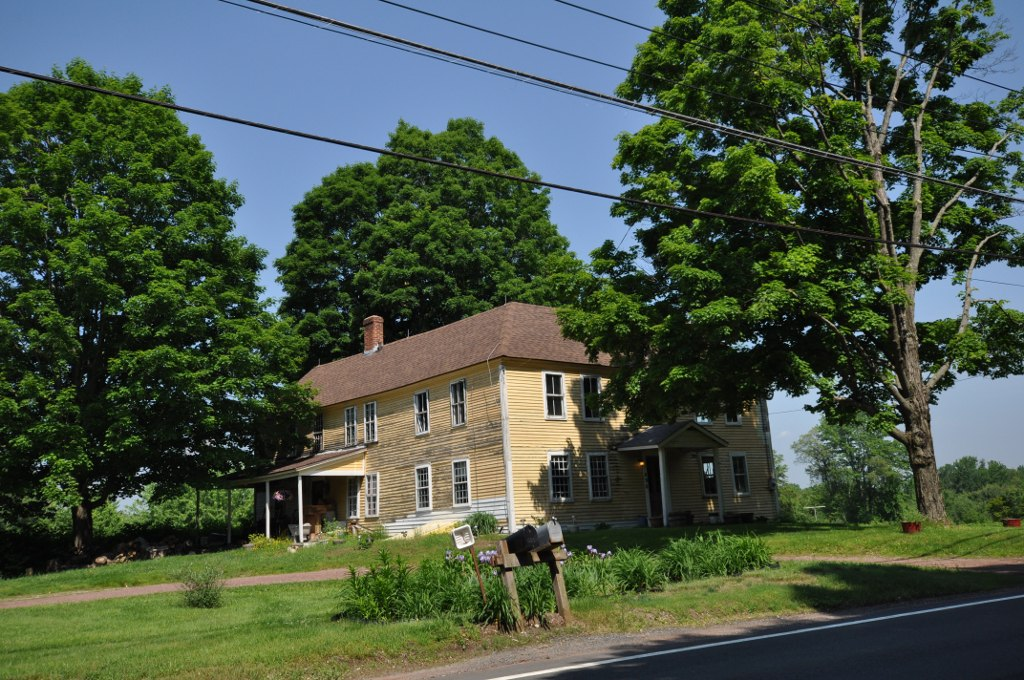

- Location within Massachusetts Location within the United States
- Location: 496 Millers Falls Rd., Northfield, Massachusetts
- Coordinates: 42°38′19″N 72°27′56″W
- Area: 29 acres (12 ha)
- Architectural style: Federal
- NRHP reference No.: 91000598
- Added to NRHP: May 28, 1991

The Simeon Alexander Jr. House (or Alexander–Kiablick House) is an historic house on Millers Falls Road south of Pine Meadow Road in Northfield, Massachusetts. Built about 1780, it is one of the town's best surviving examples of an early Federal period farmhouse, built by a prosperous local farmer. The house was listed on the National Register of Historic Places in 1991.

== Description and history ==
The Simeon Alexander Jr. House is located in a rural setting south of the town center of Northfield, on the west side of Millers Falls Road (Massachusetts Route 63) about 0.75 miles (1.21 km) south of Pine Meadow Road. It is a rambling 2 1/2-story wood-frame structure, with an east-facing main block and a series of ells extending to the west. The main block is five bays wide, with a center entrance sheltered by a Victorian-era gabled portico. Joined to the main block and extending west is another 2 1/2-story section, with a south-facing entrance sheltered by a shed-roof portico. The interior of the main block has largely original finishes, including paintings executed on the walls of the north parlor. Although its central chimney has been removed, its base survives in the basement.

The house, which has both Georgian and Federal features, is said to have been built in 1744 by Simeon Alexander, a military officer, but is more likely to have been built c. 1774 by his son, Simeon Alexander Jr. The younger man was an American Revolutionary War soldier; the property remained in the Alexander family until 1941. The Alexanders were among the town's first settlers, with George Alexander, their progenitor, arriving in 1673. The artwork on the parlor walls has tentatively been attributed to Noah Graves, an itinerant painter from nearby Sunderland, whose definitely attributed works in other buildings of the region it resembles.

== See also ==
- National Register of Historic Places listings in Franklin County, Massachusetts
