= Charlemont Village Historic District =

Historic district in Massachusetts, United States

- U.S. National Register of Historic Places
- U.S. Historic district
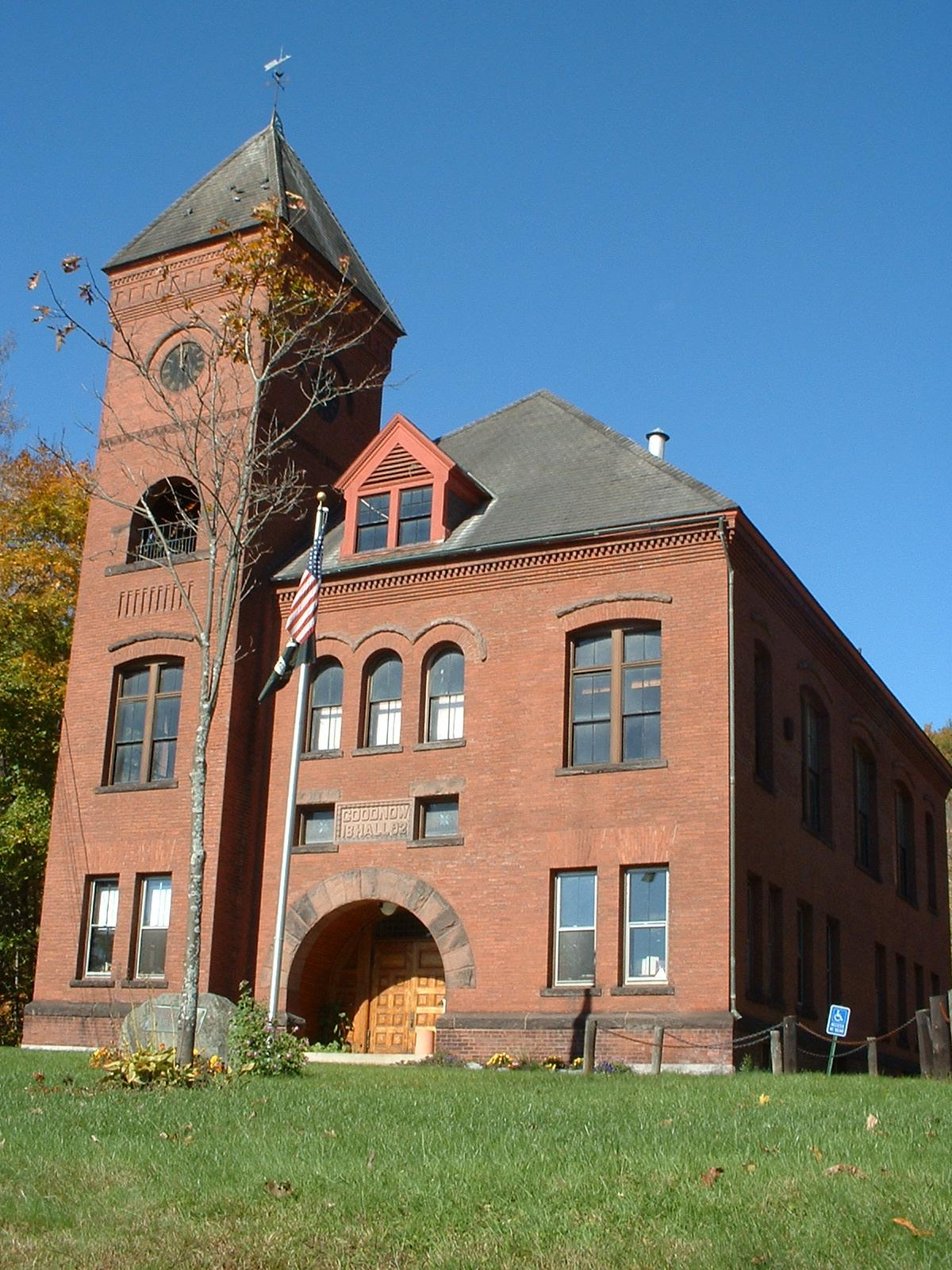
- Charlemont Town Hall

- Location within Massachusetts Location within the United States
- Location: Main St., Charlemont, Massachusetts
- Coordinates: 42°37′40″N 72°52′27″W
- Area: 50 acres (20 ha)
- Architectural style: Greek Revival, Late Victorian, Federal
- NRHP reference No.: 87001880
- Added to NRHP: February 10, 1988

The Charlemont Village Historic District is a historic district on Massachusetts Route 2 between South Street and Harmony Lane, encompassing much of the village center of Charlemont, Massachusetts, United States. The district's properties represent the growth of the village center from its rural origin through a period of 19th century industrialization, including 18th and 19th century farmsteads, Greek Revival buildings of the mid 19th century, and later 19th century Victorian architectural styles. The district was added to the National Register of Historic Places in 1988.

== Description and history ==
The area that is now the town of Charlemont was surveyed by colonists in 1736, with settlement following in the early 1740s. It was abandoned during King George's War in the late 1740s, and resettled soon after that war ended. The village center was the principal nexus of this early settlement, even including a grist mill on Mill Brook. Significant population growth did not take place until the 1760s, and the town incorporated in 1765. The village was the site of an early tavern, where the 1787 Charlemont Inn now stands; it is said that Benedict Arnold stayed there in the early days of the American Revolutionary War. The town's economy was based on agriculture, taking advantage of the fertile floodplain of the Deerfield River. The village experienced a growth spurt in the third quarter of the 19th century, when the Hoosac Tunnel construction brought workers to the town, and continued through the end of the 19th century. Its economic fortunes waned in the early 20th century, with the advent of the automobile and a decline in its small industries.

The historic district is basically linear in shape, extending for about 1 mile (1.6 km) along Massachusetts Route 2, the principal east-west route through the town. Its western boundary is roughly Harmony Lane, and its eastern end is at South Street. Prominent buildings in the district, in addition to the inn, include the 1803 Baptist church (built elsewhere and moved here in the 19th century), an 1831 two-story schoolhouse, Greek Revival church buildings for Congregationalist and Methodist congregations, and the town hall, a high-style Romanesque brick building constructed in 1892.

== See also ==
- National Register of Historic Places listings in Franklin County, Massachusetts
