= North Cemetery (Leverett, Massachusetts) =

Historic cemetery in Massachusetts, United States

- U.S. National Register of Historic Places
- Location within Massachusetts Location within the United States
- Location: 114 Montague St., Leverett, Massachusetts
- Coordinates: 42°28′3″N 72°29′54″W
- Area: 1 acre (0.40 ha)
- Built: c. 1776
- NRHP reference No.: 100005276
- Added to NRHP: July 1, 2020

North Cemetery is a historic cemetery at 114 Montague Street in Leverett, Massachusetts, United States. The 1-acre (0.40 ha) municipal cemetery is located on the west side of the street about 1 mile (1.6 km) north of Leverett center. The cemetery, whose oldest documented burials date to 1776, was listed on the National Register of Historic Places in 2020. Its burials include some of the town's early residents.

== Description and history ==
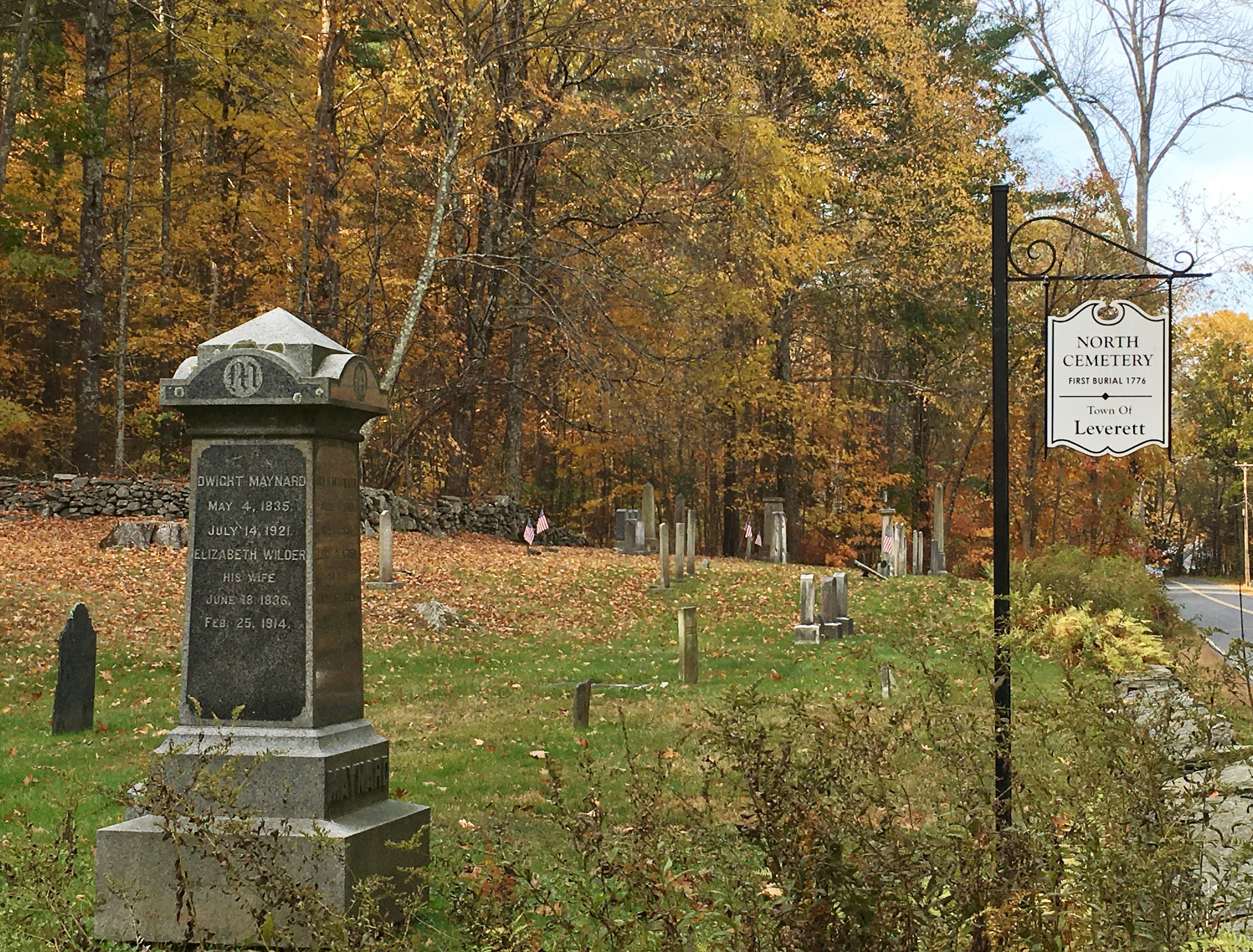

North Cemetery is located about 1 mile (1.6 km) north of the Leverett Center, the town's main village center, on the west side of Montague Street. The 1-acre (0.40 ha) cemetery is roughly rectangular, with a low fieldstone wall ringing it. There are two pedestrian entrances in the wall facing the street, and there is no formal circulation pattern. Prominent markers in the cemetery include a large boulder that serves as a marker for the Fishel family site, and a series of 19th-century marble obelisks in its northern section.

The cemetery's earliest documented burial is the grave of Abraham Kellogg, who is said to have died in 1776 fighting in the American Revolutionary War. Also buried here is Joseph Clary (d. 1780), an early resident of the area who signed the petition for the separation of Leverett from Sunderland, and served as the new town's first town clerk and selectman. The cemetery includes burials of people who lived far away but trace their ancestry to Leverett's early families. Burials have continued into the 21st century; there are 78 marked sites.

== See also ==
- National Register of Historic Places listings in Franklin County, Massachusetts
