= East Charlemont District School =

- U.S. National Register of Historic Places
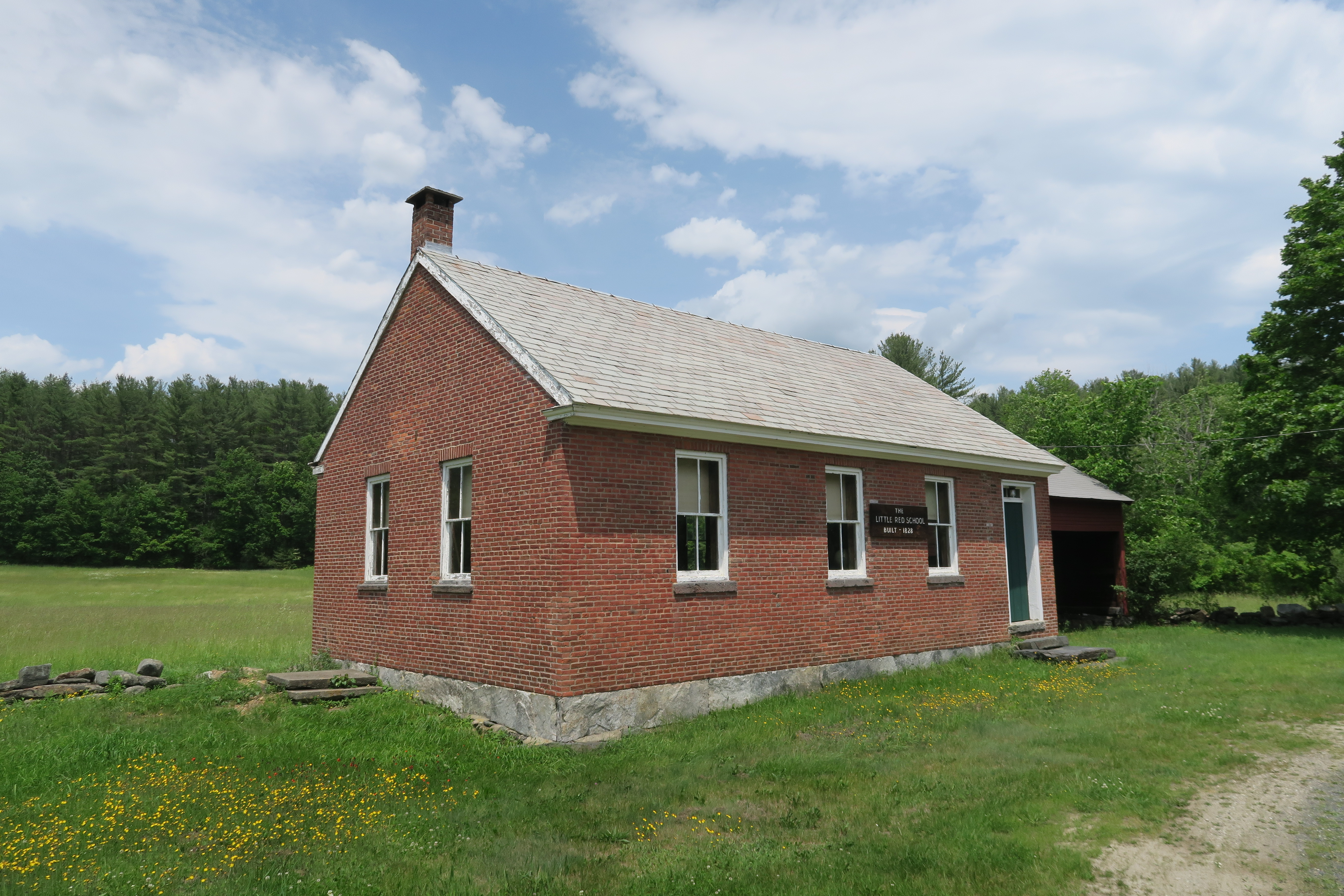
- East Charlemont District School

- Location within Massachusetts Location within the United States
- Location: 1811 MA 2, Charlemont, Massachusetts
- Coordinates: 42°37′24″N 72°47′13″W
- Area: Less than one acre
- Built: 1828
- Architectural style: Vernacular Federal
- NRHP reference No.: 100000721
- Added to NRHP: March 7, 2017

The East Charlemont District School is a historic district school building at 1811 Massachusetts Route 2 in Charlemont, Massachusetts, United States. Built in 1828, it is one of a small number of surviving brick district schoolhouses in the state of Massachusetts. The building was listed on the National Register of Historic Places in 2017.

== Description and history ==
The East Charlemont District School stands in a rural setting in eastern Charlemont, on the north side of MA 2 west of its junction with East Oxbow Road and crossing of Oxbow Brook. It is a single-story brick structure, with a gabled slate roof. A wood-frame ell extends to one side. The main facade is four bays wide, with the main entrance in the rightmost bay, topped by a four-light transom window. The other bays are unevenly spaced sash windows set in rectangular openings. There is a chimney at the left of the structure.

The school was built in 1828, at a time when there was a small village surrounding the property. It was built largely by the efforts of East Charlemont villagers, its bricks manufactured at a nearby brickyard. The school remained in active use as a school until 1944, by which time a significant number of the village buildings had been demolished, and it served only a small number of students. Its interior has remained remarkably unchanged since its closure, in part due to a decision by the town to preserve the building, using it only for local meetings and educational tours for children.

== See also ==
- National Register of Historic Places listings in Franklin County, Massachusetts
