= Old Tavern Farm =

- U.S. National Register of Historic Places
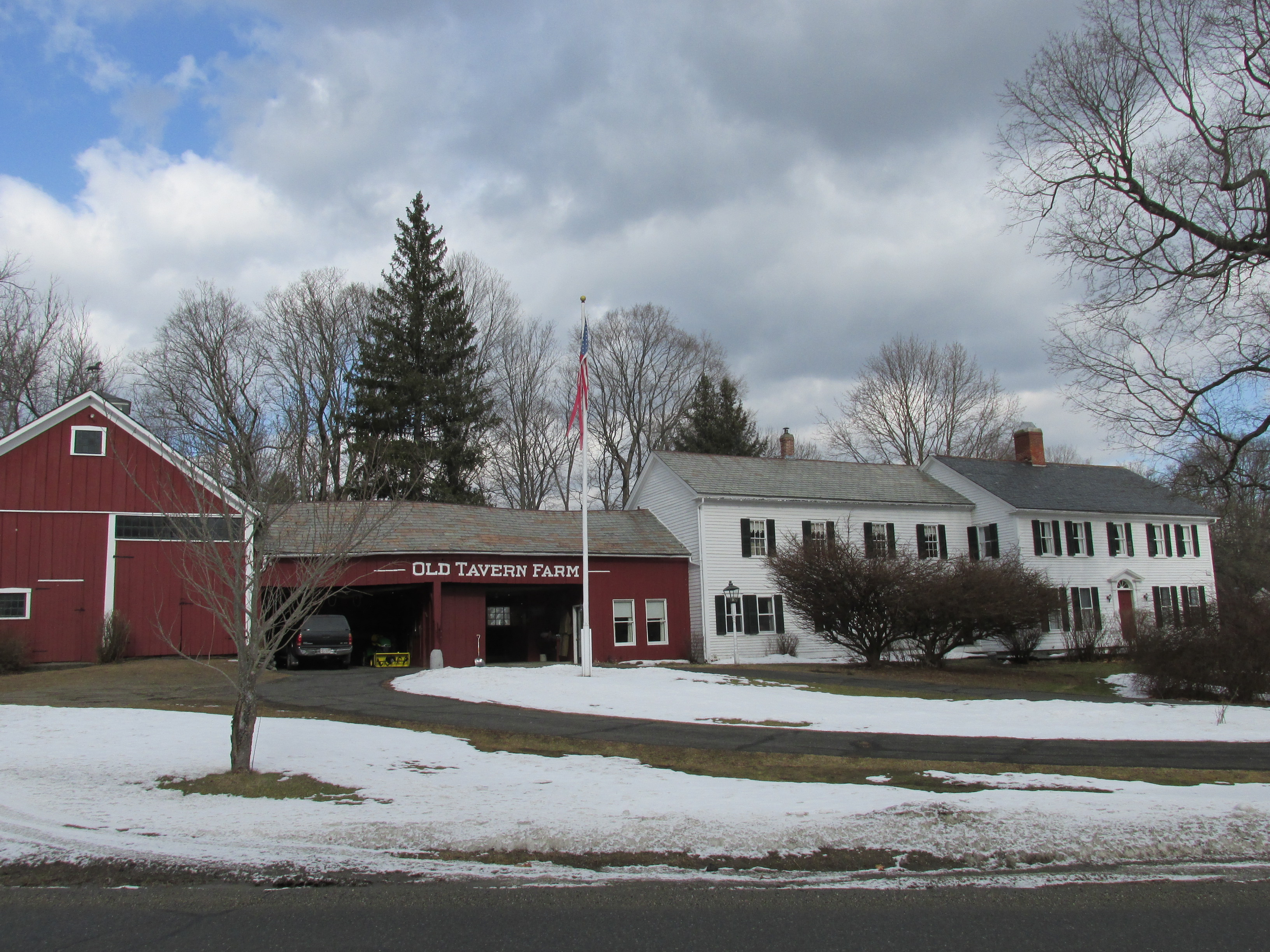

- Location within Massachusetts Location within the United States
- Location: Greenfield, Massachusetts
- Coordinates: 42°37′20″N 72°38′9″W
- Area: 1.6 acres (0.65 ha)
- Built: 1740
- Architectural style: Federal
- NRHP reference No.: 05000120
- Added to NRHP: March 10, 2005

The Old Tavern Farm is a historic farmstead at 817 Colrain Road in Greenfield, Massachusetts. The main structure exemplifies the organic growth of a farm complex from colonial days into the 19th century. The main block of the house is a Federal style 2-1/2 story center chimney structure, built c. 1820. A 42-foot (13 m) wing added onto the main block's west side is built in part on a foundation dating to 1740; this section of the house was apparently built in 1794, tearing down the earlier 1740 construction. This wing is attached at its other end to a 19th-century barn.

The origins of this farmstead lie in the movements of Samuel Hinsdale (1708–86), whose father Mehuman, a tavern owner, was taken captive by Native Americans in the 1704 Raid on Deerfield. The elder Hinsdale died in 1736, willing this land, then still part of Deerfield to his son, who apparently built here around 1740, the year before his son was born. Not long afterward, Hinsdale was known to operating a tavern, for which he was formally licensed in 1747, although it is unclear if the license was for this location. Hinsdale was elected to the first board of selectmen when the Greenfield was separated from Deerfield in 1753. By 1787, when his estate was inventoried, Hinsdale had unambiguously been operating a tavern here, as well as a cooper's shop. The tavern continued to be operated by his sons. After 1836 the tavern was operated by others, and was closed in 1860, apparently due to the temperance movement.

In the later part of the 19th century the property, then 160 acres (65 ha), was used primarily for agricultural purposes by the Smith family, whose descendants occupied the property until 1997. Now much reduced in size, the property is operated as a bed and breakfast inn, reviving its earlier use as a service to travelers.

The farmstead was listed on the National Register of Historic Places in 2005.

== See also ==
- National Register of Historic Places listings in Franklin County, Massachusetts
