= Orange Armory =

- U.S. National Register of Historic Places
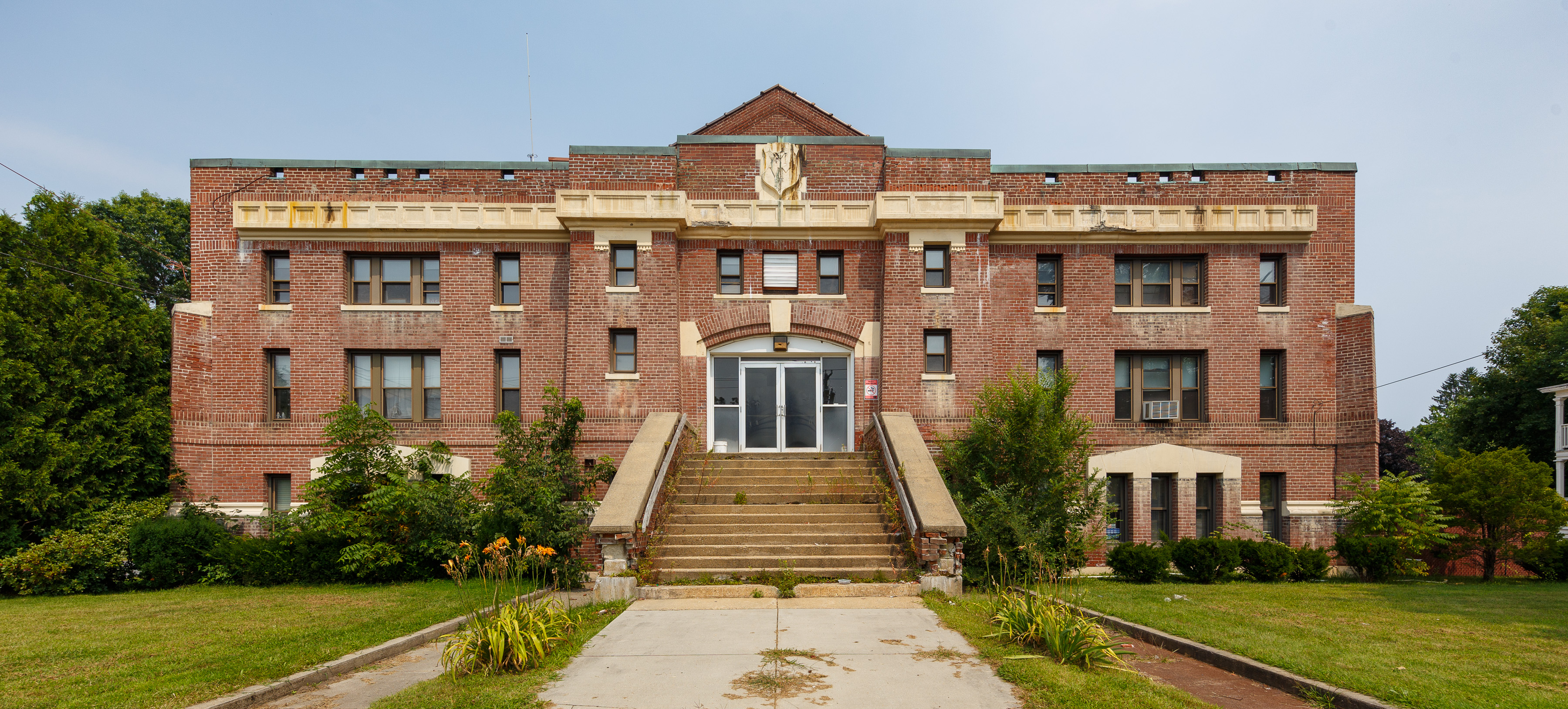

- Location within Massachusetts Location within the United States
- Location: 135 E. Main St., Orange, Massachusetts
- Coordinates: 42°35′24″N 72°18′13″W
- Built: 1913
- NRHP reference No.: 100005477
- Added to NRHP: August 27, 2020

The Orange Armory is a historic armory building at 135 East Main Street in Orange, Massachusetts, United States. Built in 1913, it served as an organizing and station point for volunteer forces in World War I, and for state militia units into the 1960s. It was listed on the National Register of Historic Places in 2020.

== Description and history ==
The Orange Armory is located east of the town's central business district, on the north side of East Main Street opposite Mill Street. It is a large brick building, with a two-story headhouse in front, and a large drill shed behind. The headhouse is a basically rectangular block, with a slightly elevated basement level separated from the upper floors by a cast concrete water table. A broad stair rises to the main entrance in the center of its street-facing facade, with the arched entrance flanked by projecting elements. The drill shed is covered by a gabled roof. The interior of the building is utilitarian, with few decorative elements; much of this finish appears to be original to the building's 1913 construction period.

The armory was built in 1912-1913 for $60,000. It was occupied by Company E of the 2nd Massachusetts Volunteer Militia, a unit which served on the Pancho Villa Expedition of 1913, and as part of the American Expeditionary Forces sent to Europe in World War I. The building was turned over to the town in 1975, by which time it had ceased its original function. The town now uses the building as a multifunction space.

== See also ==
- National Register of Historic Places listings in Franklin County, Massachusetts
- Orange Center Historic District (Massachusetts)
