= Heath Center Historic District =

Historic district in Massachusetts, United States

- U.S. National Register of Historic Places
- U.S. Historic district
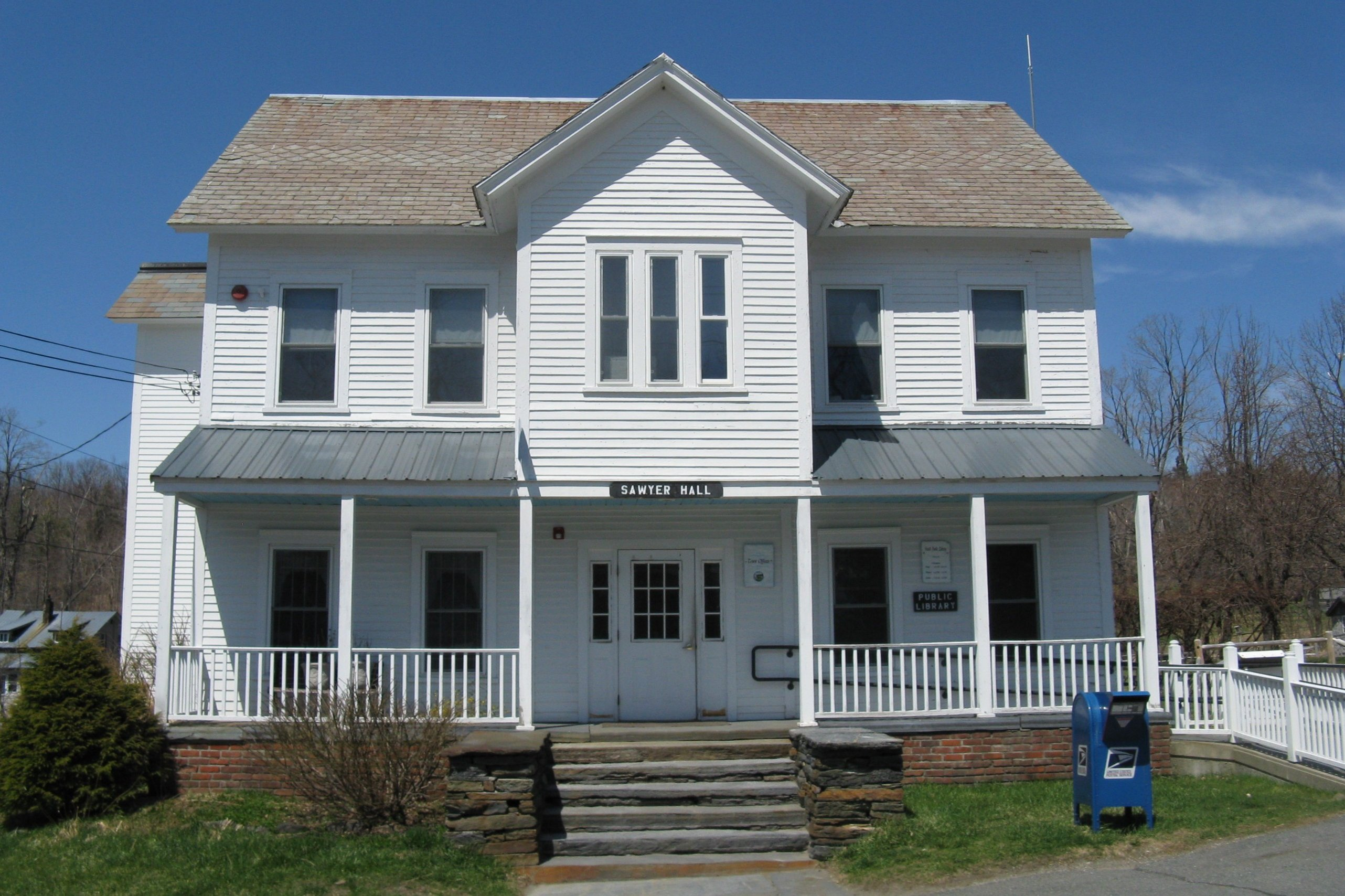
- Sawyer Hall

- Location within Massachusetts
- Location: Heath, Massachusetts
- Coordinates: 42°40′24.4″N 72°49′18.5″W
- Area: 84.5 acres (34.2 ha)
- Architect: Snow, Col. David; et al.
- Architectural style: Mid-19th-century Revival, Late Victorian
- NRHP reference No.: 07001103 (original); 100001503 (increase)

Significant dates
- Added to NRHP: October 25, 2007
- Boundary increase: August 24, 2017

The Heath Center Historic District encompasses a rural village with predominantly 18th- and 19th-century structures in Heath, a small agricultural town in hills of northwestern Franklin County, Massachusetts, United States. The district is centered on the junction of several roads, around which the center of the town grew. South Road arrives from the south, East Main Street and Bray Road from the east, Ledge Road from the north, and West Main Street from the west.

The first European settlement in what is now Heath was Fort Shirley, built in 1744 to defend the frontier of Massachusetts against French and Native American attacks. Permanent residents began to settle the area in the 1750s, and what is now Heath Center began to organize in 1765, when the area was still part of Charlemont. Originally known as Charlemont Hill, Heath was incorporated in 1785. In 1789 the nucleus of its civic center was determined by the placement of the meetinghouse and common on land of Benjamin Maxwell.

The center includes a cluster of well-preserved late colonial (Georgian) and early Federal style homes, and a number of institutional buildings that date from the 19th century. The only major Greek Revival building is the Old Town Hall, built in 1835. All of the village's churches date to later periods: the Union Evangelical Church is a Gothic Revival structure built in 1835, and the Methodist Church was built in 1872 in the Italianate style. The dominant style of the district's houses is Federal, although there are a few examples of later 19th-century and early 20th-century styles also to be seen. The district was listed on the National Register of Historic Places in 2007, and was increased in size in 2017.

== See also ==
- National Register of Historic Places listings in Franklin County, Massachusetts
