= Shelburne Free Public Library =

- U.S. National Register of Historic Places
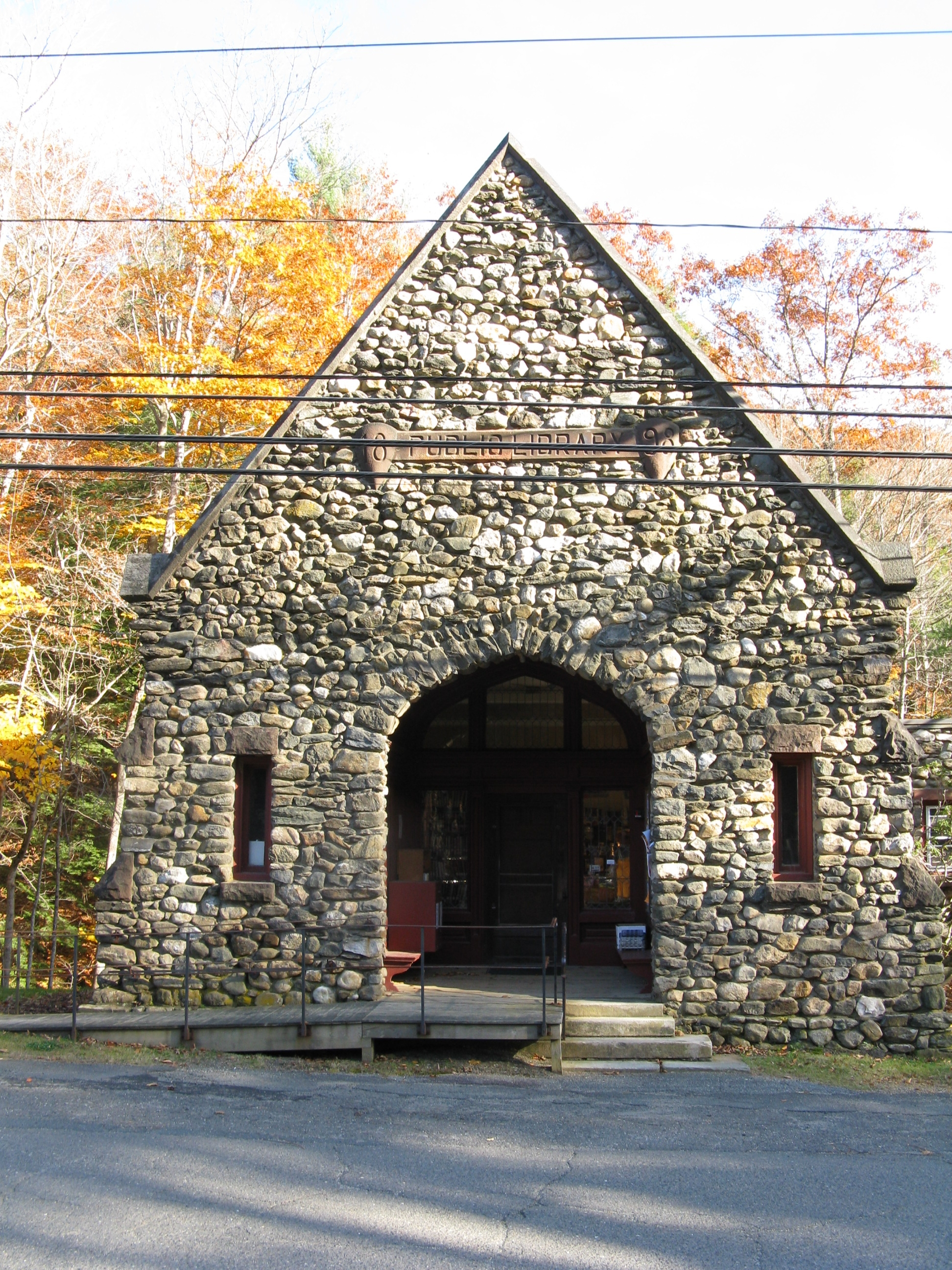

- Location within Massachusetts Location within the United States
- Location: 233 Shelburne Center Rd., Shelburne, Massachusetts
- Coordinates: 42°35′20″N 72°41′19″W
- Built: 1898
- Built by: George Burnham
- Architectural style: Gothic Revival
- NRHP reference No.: 16000453
- Added to NRHP: July 18, 2016

The Shelburne Free Public Library is one of two public libraries in Shelburne, Massachusetts. It is located at 233 Shelburne Center Road, in an architecturally distinctive 1898 Gothic Revival stone structure built out of local riverstone. The building was listed on the National Register of Historic Places in 2016.

== Architecture and history ==
The Shelburne Free Library stands in the small village of Shelburne Center, just south of Massachusetts Route 2 on the east side of Shelburne Center Road. It is a roughly square 1 1/2-story gable-roofed stone structure, built of local stone laid in an uncourse mortared manner. Its main facade is symmetrical, with the main entrance set in a segmented-arch recess whose side and end walls are paneled. Flanking this recess on either side are narrow rectangular windows. The gable rises to a level slightly above that of the main roof, and has small buttresses at the ends. The side walls each have three windows. A single-story addition, built out of similar materials, projects southward from the rear corner.

The library was founded in 1854 by William and Walter Wells, who established a lending library in one of their homes, and charged an annual fee of $3 for its use. The Wellses amassed a collection of 2,000 books that rivaled that of the Arms Library, a free library established in Shelburne Falls a few years earlier. The library was formally organized in 1895, and the present building's main block was built in 1898. The stones used in its construction were reportedly gathered from all over the rural community and brought to the site, stockpiled over years until a sufficient quantity were accumulated. The addition, built in 1952–53, was also built out of local stone, carefully chosen and laid to match the original.

== See also ==
- National Register of Historic Places listings in Franklin County, Massachusetts
