= Franklin County Fairgrounds =

- U.S. National Register of Historic Places
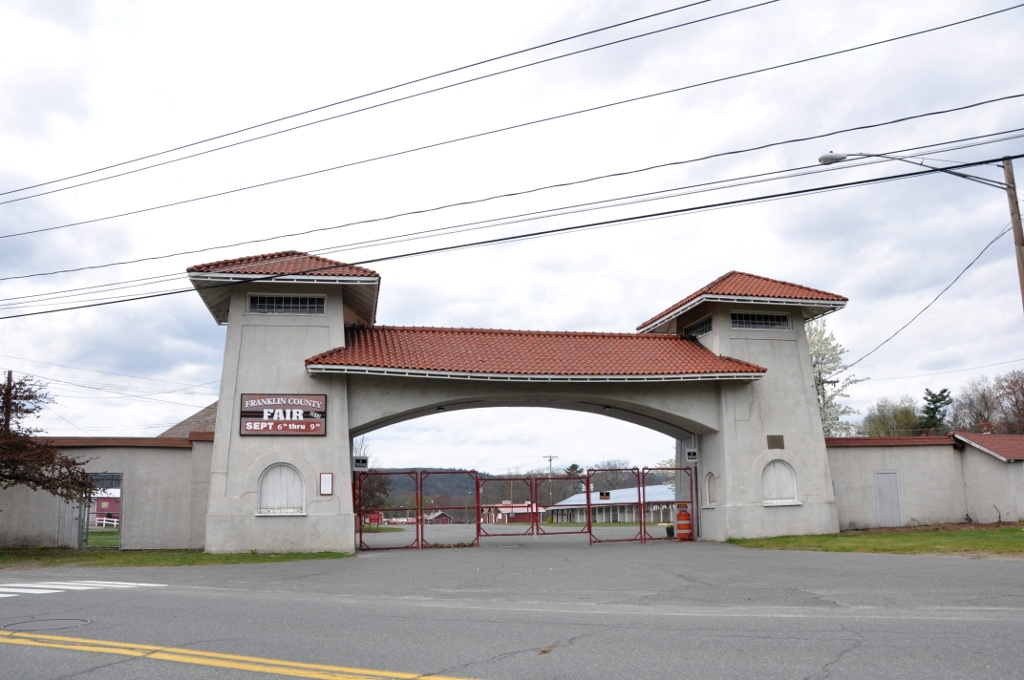
- Entrance gate

- Location within Massachusetts Location within the United States
- Location: 89 Wisdom Way, Greenfield, Massachusetts
- Coordinates: 42°34′44″N 72°36′42″W
- Area: 27.75 acres (11.23 ha)
- Built: 1865
- NRHP reference No.: 11000359
- Added to NRHP: June 15, 2011

The Franklin County Fairgrounds are located at 85 Wisdom Way in Greenfield, Massachusetts. Established in 1865 (for a fair begun in 1848), they are among the oldest and best-preserved fairgrounds in the state, featuring an oval racetrack and a variety of exhibition and midway buildings. The grounds were listed on the National Register of Historic Places on June 15, 2011.

== Description and history ==
The Franklin County Fairgrounds are located southwest of downtown Greenfield, across the Green River on a high plateau. The property is over 27 acres (11 ha) in size, ringed by public roadways that are relatively sparsely developed. Its largest feature is an oval racetrack occupying the southern portion of the grounds; the midway is located adjacent to the northern part of the track, while the permanent exhibition halls are in the northeast part of the property. The oldest building in the complex is called The Roundhouse; it is a two-story circular structure that is 72 feet (22 m) in diameter. It features a conical roof and novelty siding. The entrance gates were built in a Mission style in 1917. The exhibition halls are long rectangular single story buildings. Most of the buildings on the fairgrounds were built before 1955.

The Franklin County Fair was established in 1848, and originally took place near the Greenfield town center. It was eventually crowded off that land by expansion of the town and the routing of the railroad across part of the grounds, and it moved further out in 1860. The present fairgrounds were established in 1865. The property originally included a racetrack, although in a different configuration; the present arrangement of that feature was made in 1895.

== See also ==
- National Register of Historic Places listings in Franklin County, Massachusetts
