= Conway Center Historic District =

Historic district in Massachusetts, United States

- U.S. National Register of Historic Places
- U.S. Historic district
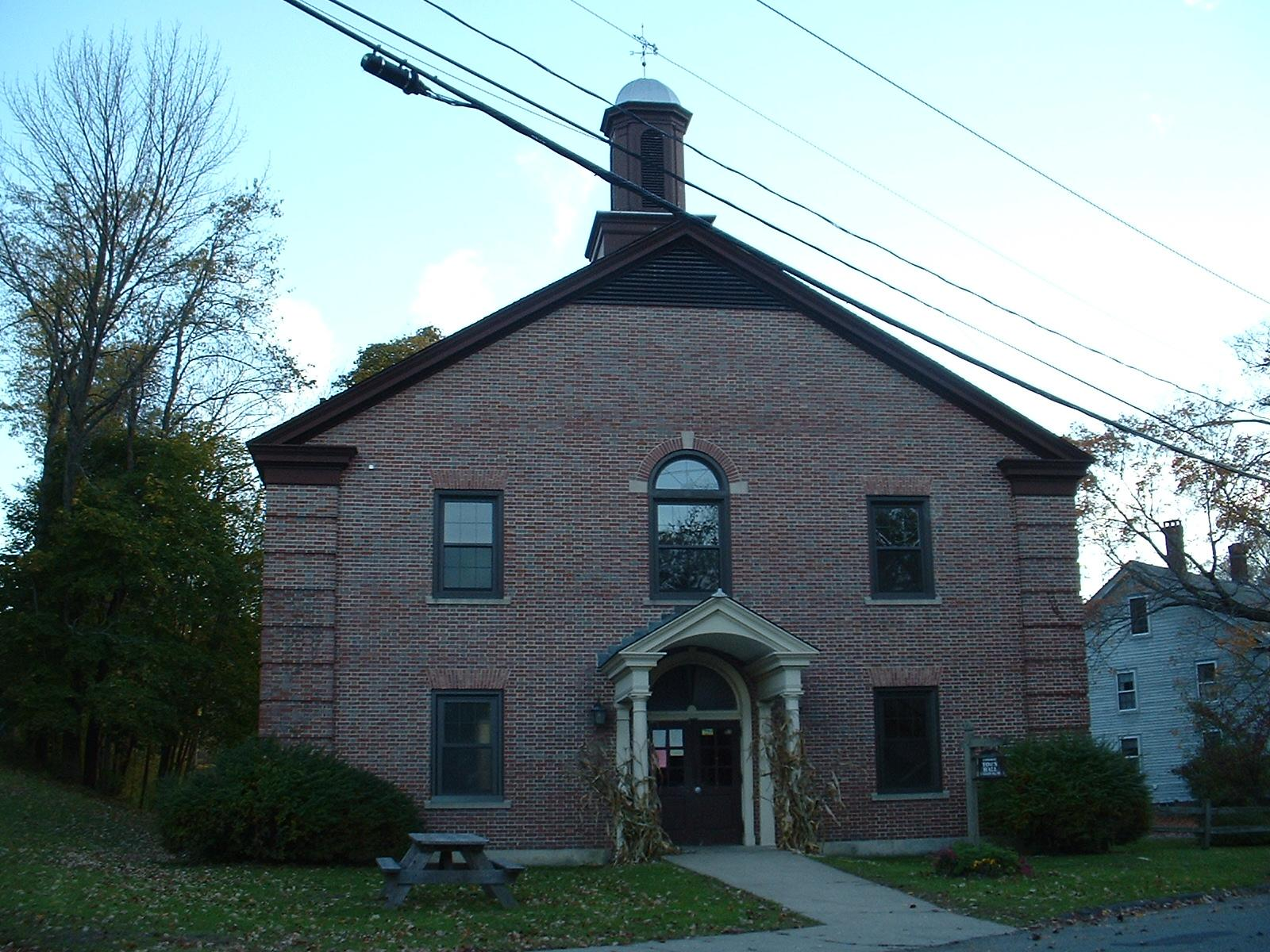
- Conway Town Hall

- Location within Massachusetts Location within the United States
- Location: Conway, Massachusetts
- Coordinates: 42°30′31″N 72°41′50″W
- Area: 24 acres (9.7 ha)
- Built: 1830
- Architectural style: Federal, Greek Revival
- NRHP reference No.: 99001043
- Added to NRHP: September 10, 1999

The Conway Center Historic District encompasses the historic village center of Conway, Massachusetts. The district is focused on Main Street, a section of Massachusetts Route 116 that connects two major road intersections on either side of the South River. It includes properties on Main Street, Elm Street, and Academy Hill Road, and is generally representative of the growth of the community between about 1830 and 1930. The district was listed on the National Register of Historic Places in 1999.

== Description and history ==
The town of Conway was settled in the 1760s and incorporated in 1767. The town's meetinghouse and early taverns were located in the area of the South River, along the main east-west road (which ran north of present Massachusetts Route 116). The area saw increased economic activity with the advent of industrialization in the 19th century, which took place in Conway primarily a short way to the west of the center in Burkeville. The main road was relocated southward in 1832, from which time the present town center began to take shape. The lack of railroad access to the area hurt the town's textile mills in the later 19th century, whose decline a belated introduction of a streetcar rail failed to stem.

Many of the structures in Conway Center are houses, which are predominantly of 19th century wood frame construction, although there are a number of Colonial Revival structures from the early 20th century. Forty percent of the building stock was built during the boom years of the 1840s and 1850s, and is mainly Greek Revival in character. Prominent buildings include the 1895-6 Queen Anne style Masonic Hall, and the 1901 Classical Revival Field Memorial Library. The district also includes the bridge carrying Main Street over the river (built 1925, concrete), and a traffic island at the western end of the district (where Main Street meets River Street, Baptist Hill Road, and Shelburne Hill Road) which contains a water fountain erected by the Woman's Christian Temperance Union in 1905.

== See also ==
- National Register of Historic Places listings in Franklin County, Massachusetts
- Burkeville Covered Bridge
- Bardwell's Ferry Bridge
