= Gill Center Historic District =

Historic district in Massachusetts, United States

- U.S. National Register of Historic Places
- U.S. Historic district
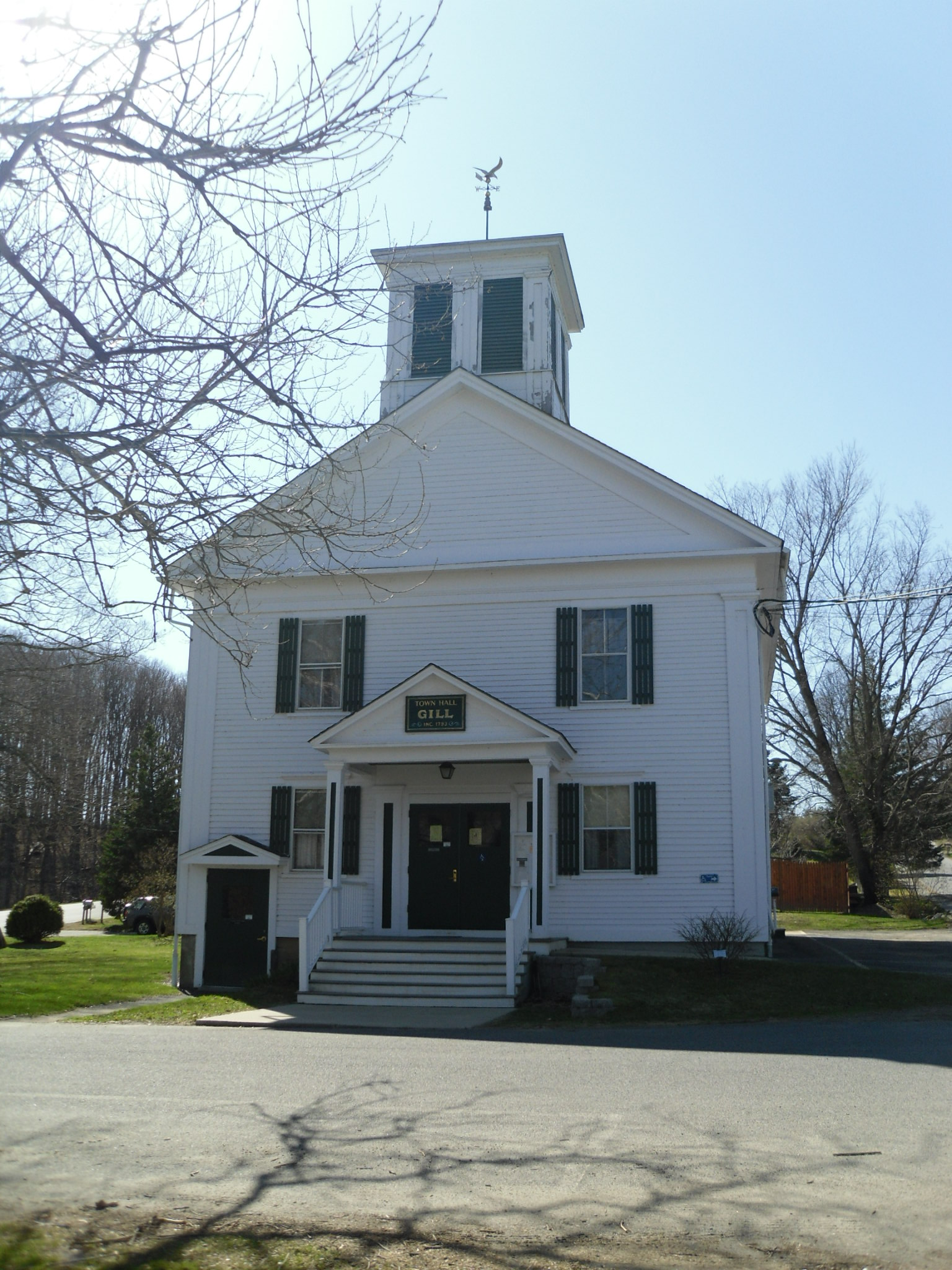
- Gill Town Hall

- Location within Massachusetts Location within the United States
- Location: Center, Main, Cross, Boyle, River, & Lyons Hill Rds., Gill, Massachusetts
- Coordinates: 42°38′28″N 72°29′58″W
- Area: Over 100 acres (40 ha)
- Architectural style: Federal, Greek Revival
- NRHP reference No.: 100003068
- Added to NRHP: November 5, 2018

The Gill Center Historic District encompasses the historic 19th-century village center of Gill, Massachusetts. The district is focused on Main Road near its junction with River Road, in the central northern part of the town, and has served as the community's center since its incorporation in 1793. The district was listed on the National Register of Historic Places in 1999; it features a variety of mainly Greek Revival and later Victorian architecture, as well as some 20th-century Colonial Revival buildings.

== Description and history ==
Gill was originally a part of Deerfield and was first settled as part of that jurisdiction in the early 18th century. It was set off as part of Greenfield in 1753 and was separately incorporated in 1793. At that time, the town's citizenry decided to erect the Congregational church near the town's geographic center, and it became the nucleus of the new town's center, standing on the north side of Center Street. The church was completed in 1796 and given a Greek Revival makeover in 1846. The center's first institutional building was a schoolhouse built in 1793; it was replaced in 1824 by one that is still standing.

The district is more than 100 acres (40 ha) in size, and is anchored by the triangular town green, which is bounded by Center, River, and Main Roads. In addition to the Congregational church and school, the district is home to Gill's Greek Revival town hall, a late 19th-century commercial building, and the Colonial Revival public library. Residential architecture is predominantly Greek Revival in character, with a few examples of older Federal style and later Italianate architecture. One unusual building is the former Methodist church, built in 1827 and converted into a residence.

== See also ==
- National Register of Historic Places listings in Franklin County, Massachusetts
