= Weldon Hotel =

- U.S. National Register of Historic Places
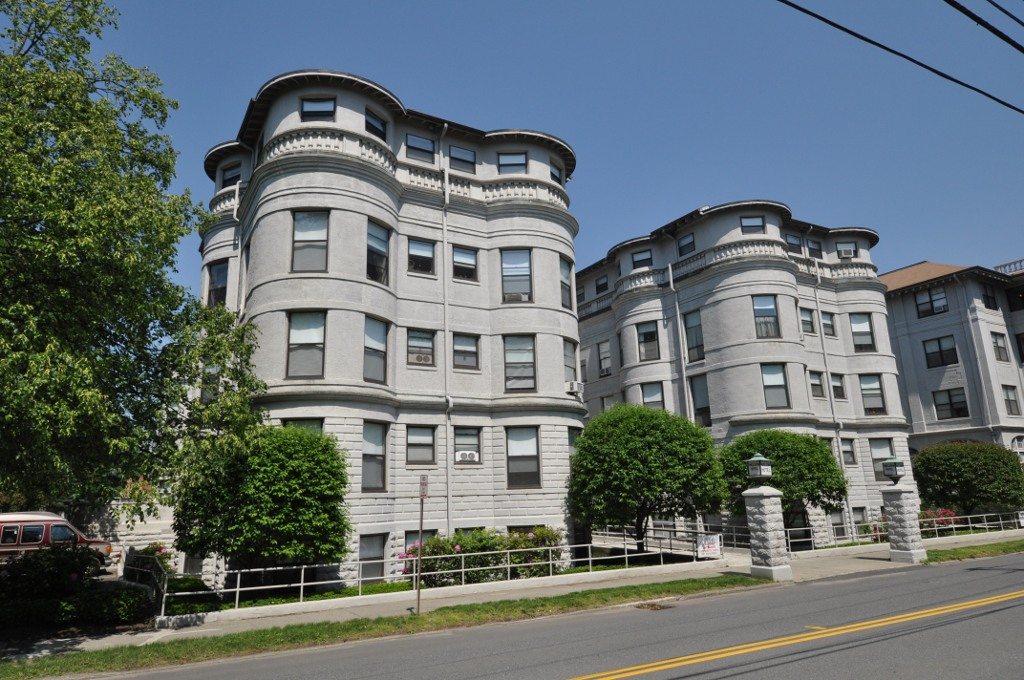

- Location within Massachusetts Location within the United States
- Location: 54 High St., Greenfield, Massachusetts
- Coordinates: 42°35′26″N 72°35′44″W
- Area: 1.8 acres (0.73 ha)
- Built: 1905
- Architect: William B. Reid
- Architectural style: Beaux Arts
- NRHP reference No.: 80000503
- Added to NRHP: August 6, 1980

The Weldon Hotel is a historic former hotel at 54 High Street in Greenfield, Massachusetts. Built in 1905 and enlarged several times, it was one of the first poured concrete buildings in the United States, and was one of Greenfield's grandest hotels of the early 20th century. It was listed on the National Register of Historic Places in 1980.

== Description and history ==
The former Weldon Hotel stands in what is a mainly residential area northeast of downtown Greenfield, on the west side of High Street. It is a five-story structure, built out of poured and block concrete on a raised basement. It is framed in iron, with floors and walls of poured concrete finished in blocks of varying texture. The lower levels have rusticated finish, and the upper levels have a smooth finish. Bowed window bays project at the building corners, and there are balconies in some side-facing units.

The hotel was designed by William B. Reid, an architect from Holyoke. The first part of the building was built in 1905 as an apartment house, but was converted into a hotel in 1907. F. O. Wells, the proprietor, was thought to be overly ambitious in operating such a large hotel, but his business eventually improved in the 1910s with the opening of the Mohawk Trail. It is said the name "Weldon" comes as a contraction of "Well Done". In 1914 Wells added a dining room on the north side of the building, and in 1927 added sixty rooms above that addition. When traffic on the Mohawk Trail went into decline, the hotel also declined, and closed in 1977. The building has since been converted into a senior living facility.

== See also ==
- National Register of Historic Places listings in Franklin County, Massachusetts
- East Main-High Street Historic District, just south of the hotel
