= Turners Falls Historic District =

Historic district in Massachusetts, United States

- U.S. National Register of Historic Places
- U.S. Historic district
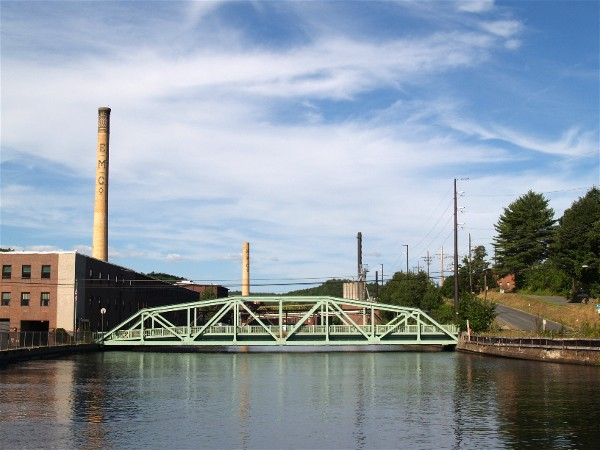
- The power canal at Turners Falls

- Location within Massachusetts Location within the United States
- Location: Roughly bounded by Connecticut River, Power Canal, 9th and L St., Turners Falls, Massachusetts
- Coordinates: 42°36′30″N 72°33′23″W
- Area: 130 acres (53 ha)
- Built: 1867
- Architect: William P. Crocker; C.W. Hazelton
- NRHP reference No.: 82004966
- Added to NRHP: May 2, 1982

Turners Falls Historic District is a historic district encompassing much of the historic center of the village of Turners Falls in the town of Montague, Massachusetts. The village is a well-preserved example of an 1870s planned industrial community. It is roughly bounded by the Connecticut River, Power Canal, 9th and L Street. The district was listed on the National Register of Historic Places in 1982.

== History ==
The village of Turners Falls was founded in the 1790s, when a canal was dug around the falls of the Connecticut River as part of a water-based transportation network. The canal remained in operation until the 1840s, when more reliable railroad transport rendered it obsolete. In 1867, Alvah Crocker, a businessman from Fitchburg, sought to harness the river's power for industrial use, and purchased the rights of the defunct transport canal. Crocker and his partners replaced the transport canal with a larger power canal, where the water power could be sold to adjacent businesses. Adjacent to the power canal, Crocker laid out a grid of streets (numbered in one orientation, lettered in the other), with Avenue A as its principal thoroughfare.

The first major business to locate there was the Russell Manufacturing Company, a Greenfield-based manufacturer of cutlery. Its plant, which has not survived, was the largest cutlery factory in the world at its greatest extent. The most prominent surviving industrial works are those of the Keith Paper Company, which was founded in 1871 but whose oldest buildings date to 1877. The village street grid encompassed worker housing (for various classes of labor and management), as well as the commercial district located mainly on Avenue A.

== See also ==
- National Register of Historic Places listings in Franklin County, Massachusetts
