= East Hawley Center Historic District =

Historic district in Massachusetts, United States

- U.S. National Register of Historic Places
- U.S. Historic district
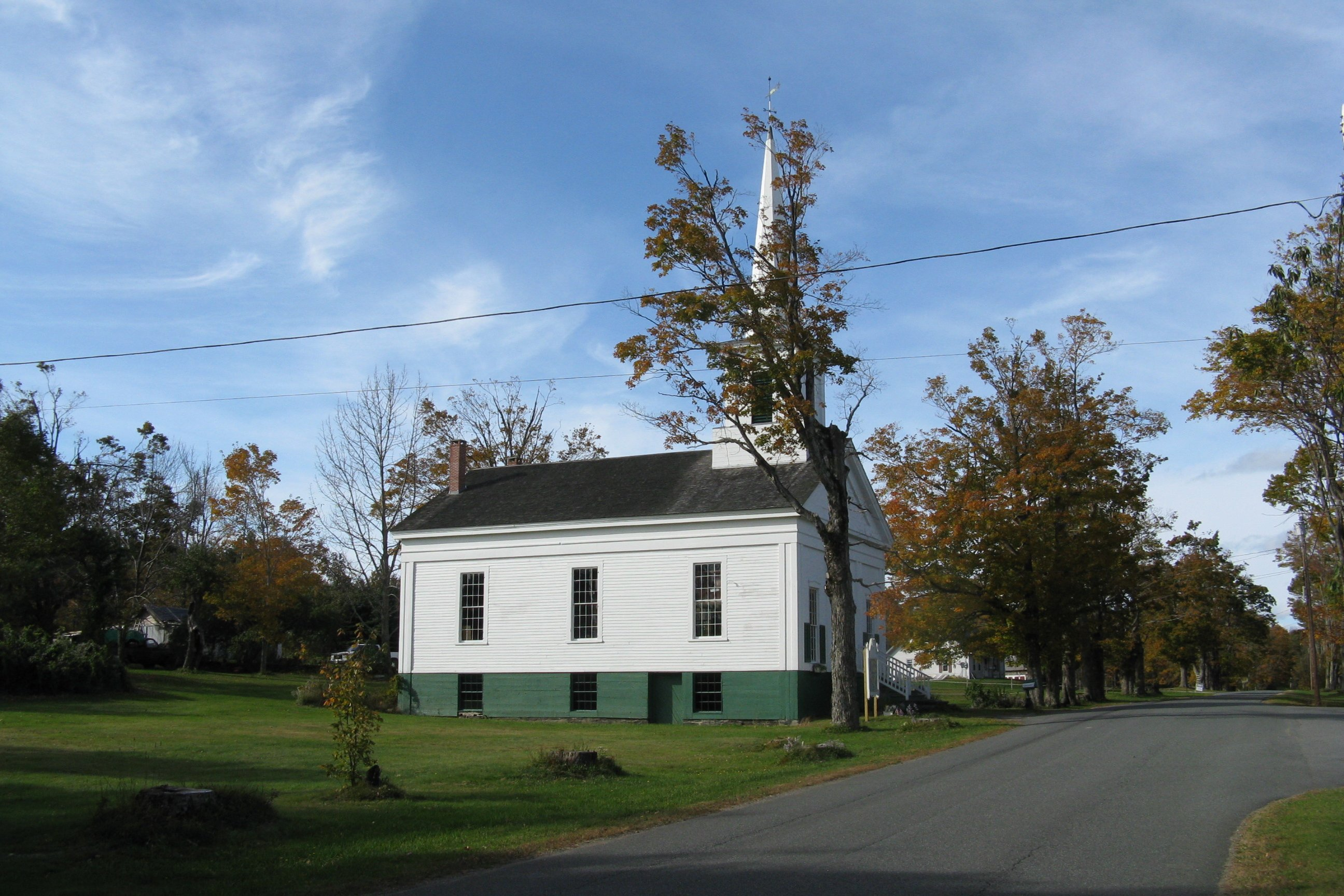
- Congregational Church

- Location within Massachusetts Location within the United States
- Location: East Hawley, Plainfield, Buckland, and Ashfield Rds., Hawley, Massachusetts
- Coordinates: 42°33′48″N 72°52′43″W
- Area: 23 acres (9.3 ha)
- Built: 1810
- Architectural style: Greek Revival, Italianate, Federal
- NRHP reference No.: 92000951
- Added to NRHP: July 24, 1992

The East Hawley Center Historic District encompasses the principal institutional center of the town of Hawley, Massachusetts, United States, with a history dating to the 1780s. Although it was settled in the late 18th century, issues with Hawley's boundaries meant that the development of a central village did not take place until later. East Hawley was developing as a local transportation hub by the mid-1820s, with several roads (mainly East Hawley Road, Plainfield Road, Ashfield Road, and Buckland Road, the latter three leading to eponymous neighboring towns) converging in the area. The establishment of a store and post office, and the relocation of the Congregational Church into the area cemented its importance in the town's civic life. There was some industrial mill activity in the area during the 19th century, but this came to an end near the end of the century, and only a mill pond remains. The district was listed on the National Register of Historic Places in 1992.

The historic district occupies a small plateau in the eastern part of the hilly town, extending along Plainfield Road between Buckland Road and Ashfield Road. The northern junction is the focal point of the village, where the town's small common (laid out in 1848) and church are located. The architecture in the district is largely vernacular in character, with modest stylistic elements from late 18th to late 19th century architectural styles. The church is probably the most architecturally sophisticated building; it is Greek Revival in character and dates to the late 1840s. One unusual feature of the district is a rare 19th-century charcoal-making kiln, which is set in the woods at the western edge of the district; it is one of the reminder's of the village's modest industrial history.

== See also ==
- National Register of Historic Places listings in Franklin County, Massachusetts
