= The Wilder Homestead =

- U.S. National Register of Historic Places
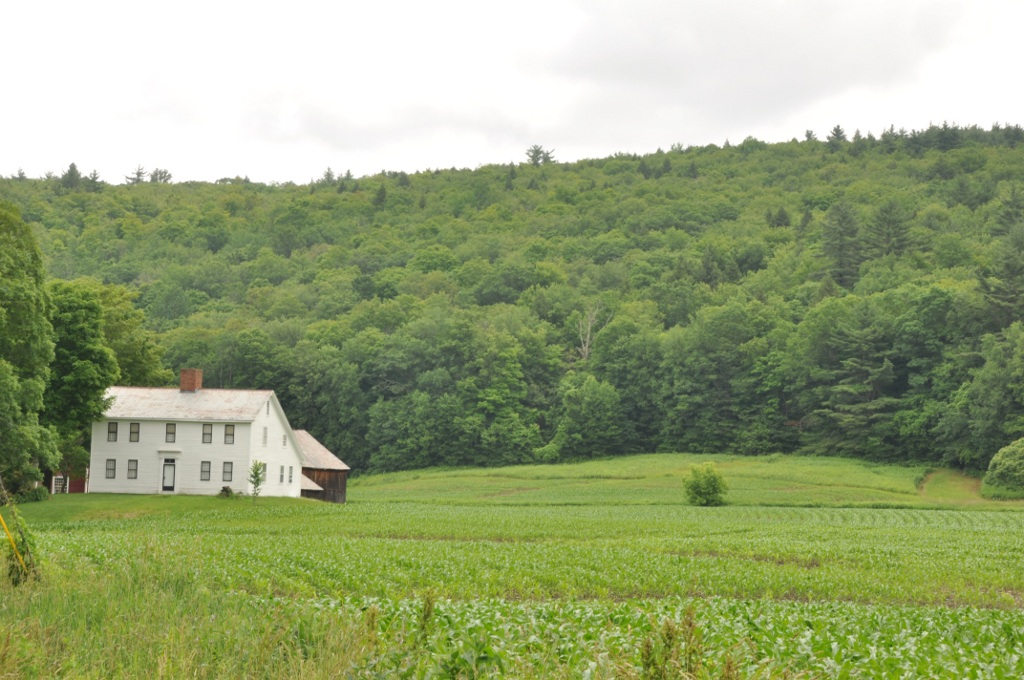

- Location within Massachusetts
- Location: Buckland, Massachusetts
- Coordinates: 42°35′59″N 72°46′44″W
- NRHP reference No.: 10001178
- Added to NRHP: January 24, 2011

The Wilder Homestead is located on Ashfield Road (Massachusetts Route 112), 0.25 miles (0.40 km) south of the Upper Road/Ashfield Road junction, in Buckland, Massachusetts. The property includes three buildings, two of which contribute to its significance. The house was built c. 1775, and is a fairly typical Georgian colonial two story house, in which the rear roof extends down to the first floor in saltbox fashion. A 19th century ell extends from the east side of the house. The house was built for Gardner Wilder, who had recently moved to the area, and had purchased 200 acres (81 ha) to farm.

The second contributing structure is a barn, whose construction was also begun by Gardner Wilder c. 1775. It was significantly enlarged with a full-height full-width extension in 1840, and a second extension, a 1 1/2-story equipment shed, was added in the 20th century. The oldest portion shows typical English colonial post and beam construction techniques, and its beams were axe-hewn, unlike those of the first addition, which show saw marks. The equipment shed was built using modern balloon framing methods.

The property remained in the hands of Gardner Wilder's descendants until 1981, when the homestead and a 58-acre (23 ha) parcel of land were donated to the Buckland Historical Society. The Society moved a 19th-century shoe shop to the property in 1991, and operates the site as a historic house museum. The property was listed on the National Register of Historic Places in 2011.

== See also ==
- National Register of Historic Places listings in Franklin County, Massachusetts
