= South School (Shutesbury, Massachusetts) =

- U.S. National Register of Historic Places
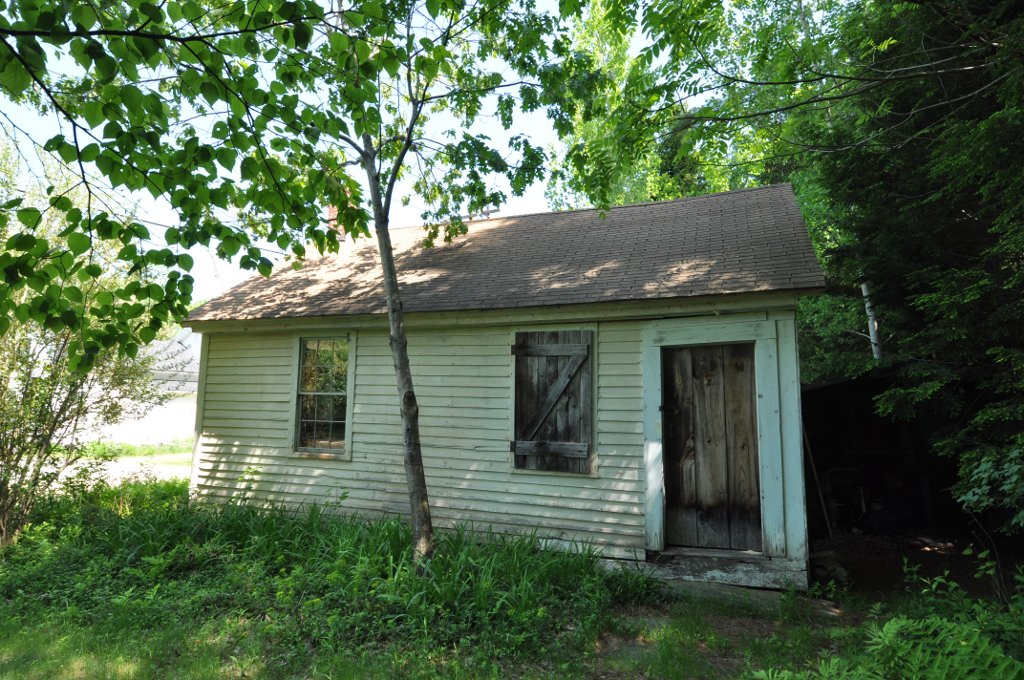

- Location within Massachusetts Location within the United States
- Location: Shutesbury, Massachusetts
- Coordinates: 42°25′11″N 72°26′0″W
- Architectural style: Federal
- NRHP reference No.: 07001312
- Added to NRHP: December 26, 2007

The South School is a historic one-room schoolhouse at 6 Schoolhouse Rd. in Shutesbury, Massachusetts. It is one of two such schoolhouses remaining in Shutesbury, and is a rare example of a side-gable construction. Its date of construction is uncertain, but is estimated to be about 1830. Because of the simplicity of the building, the presence of both Federal and Greek Revival elements in its design, and the comparatively late adoption of Greek Revival styles in the rural community, the school may have been built at a later date.

The schoolhouse sits about 15 feet off Schoolhouse Road and 50 feet from Baker Road, with its gable end facing the street. The 1 1/2-story building sits on a granite slab foundation, and has a chimney on its western wall. It measures about 25.5 feet by 18 feet, and there is a shed structure attached to the east wall. The main entrance is set in the right side of the south wall. The entry leads into a vestibule area, from which there is then entry into the schoolroom. There is a closet in the northeast corner, from which a hatch provides access to the attic area. The walls of the interior have a bead-board wainscoting, with horizontal tongue-and-groove boards rising to the ceiling. The classroom floor is wide pine, while that of the entry is narrow fir strips.

From its construction until 1928 the building served as a school, and was known as the District 8 School or the Moses S. Bartlett School, after a nearby resident. Its use declined after 1881, when the town abolished its districts, but was occasionally used due to fluctuating enrollments. The district schools were permanently closed in 1928, and elementary classes were centralized. The town sold the school for $200 in 1939, and it was converted to residential use. In 1993 the property was given to the Sirius Community, a nearby spiritual and educational organization, which has since undertaken the building's rehabilitation. The property was listed on the National Register of Historic Places in 2007.

== See also ==
- National Register of Historic Places listings in Franklin County, Massachusetts
