= Whitaker-Clary House =

Historic building New Salem, Massachusetts

- U.S. National Register of Historic Places
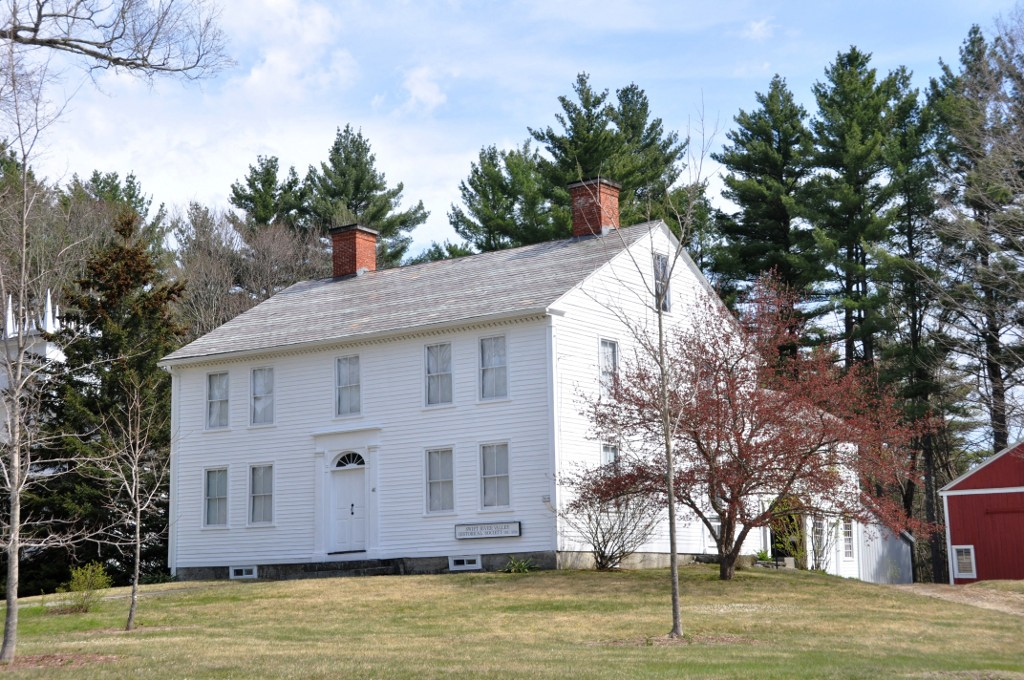

- Location within Massachusetts Location within the United States
- Location: 40 Elm St., New Salem, Massachusetts
- Coordinates: 42°32′26″N 72°18′58″W
- Area: 6 acres (2.4 ha)
- Built: c. 1816
- Architectural style: Federal
- NRHP reference No.: 75000257
- Added to NRHP: June 18, 1975

The Whitaker-Clary House is a historic house in New Salem, Massachusetts, United States. It currently houses the museum of the Swift River Historical Society. Built about 1816, it is a fine local example of Federal period architecture, and was listed on the National Register of Historic Places in 1975.

== Description and history ==
The Whitaker-Clary House is located in the village of North New Salem, on the east side of Elm Street north of United States Route 202. It is a 2 1/2-story wood-frame structure, with a gabled roof, two interior chimneys, and clapboarded exterior. Its main facade is five bays wide, with sash windows arranged symmetrically around the center entrance. The entrance has a fine Federal period surround, with flanking pilasters and a half-round transom topped by a corniced entablature. The interior follows a central hall plan, and retains many fine finishes, including woodwork finished to resemble marble. A two-story ell extends to one side.

The house was built in about 1816 by William Whitaker, was a lawyer, shopkeeper, and member of the local militia during the War of 1812. This house served as his home and law office. It was purchased form the Whitakers by Mr and Mrs Edward Clary, and it remained in the Clary family until it was taken by the Massachusetts Metropolitan District Commission (MDC) because it was in the watershed of the nearby Quabbin Reservoir. It was slated for demolition, but the MDC later changed its mind, and instead gave the house to the historical society for $1 in 1961. The house now contains artifacts and memorabilia of the towns which were inundated by the creation of the reservoir.

== See also ==
- National Register of Historic Places listings in Franklin County, Massachusetts
