= East Leverett Historic District =

Historic district in Massachusetts, United States

- U.S. National Register of Historic Places
- U.S. Historic district
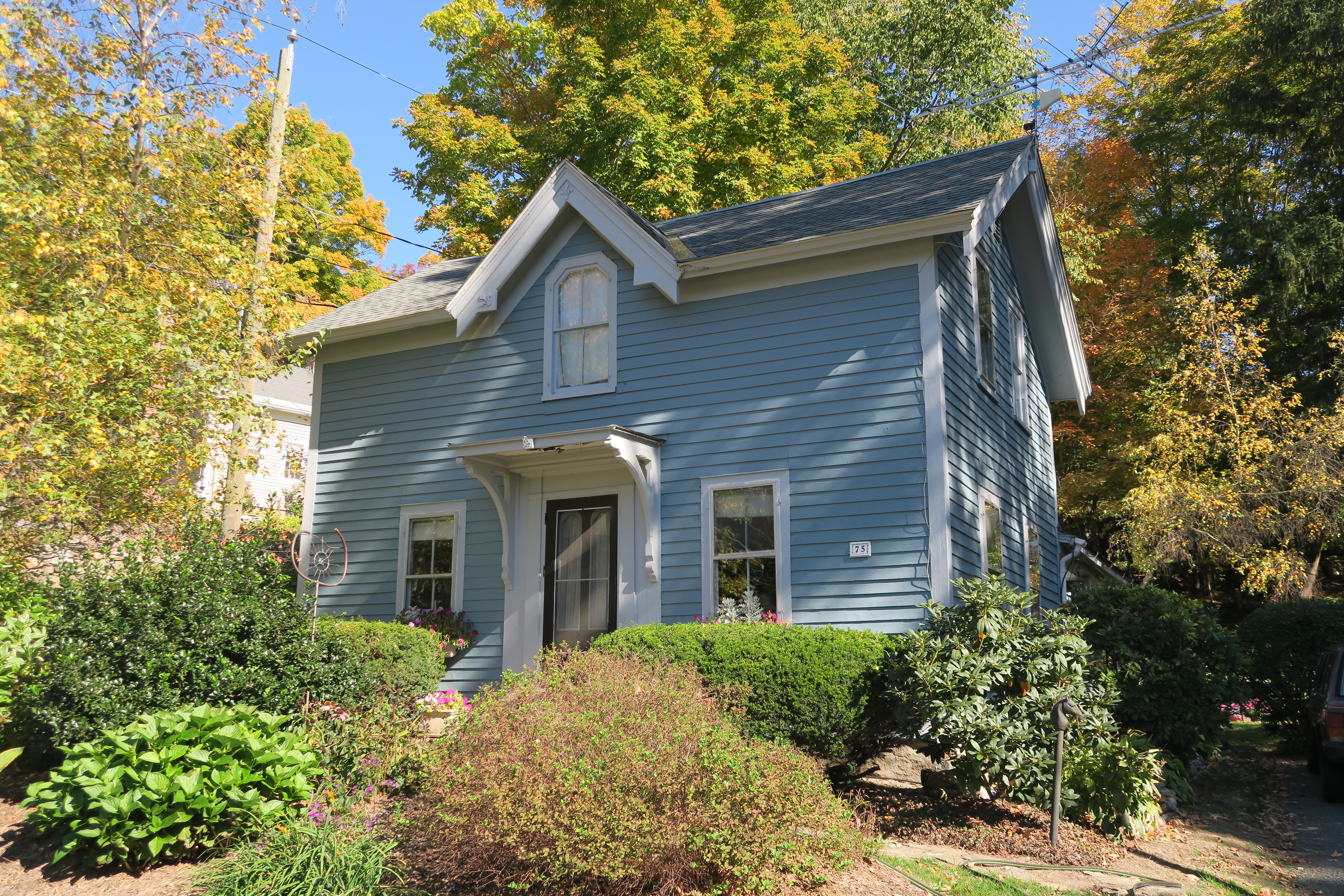
- Jervis Gilbert House

- Location within Massachusetts Location within the United States
- Location: Leverett, Massachusetts
- Coordinates: 42.438°N 72.483°W
- Built: 1790-1910
- NRHP reference No.: 13001131
- Added to NRHP: January 29, 2014

The East Leverett Historic District of Leverett, Massachusetts, encompasses the historic mill village of East Leverett. Centered on the intersection of Cushman Road and Shutesbury Road in the southeastern portion of the rural town, it includes predominantly residential buildings that were built during the height of the area's industrial activity in the first four decades of the 19th century. The architecture is mainly Federal and Greek Revival in style. The district was listed on the National Register of Historic Places in 2014.

== Description and history ==
The town of Leverett was separated from neighboring Sunderland in 1774. The area that is now East Leverett was acquired by Sunderland in 1729 as a "Two-Mile Addition" to increase the area of its arable land. The village of East Leverett is located in the southeastern part of Leverett, at a point that has had a bridge across Roaring Brook since at least 1794. Cushman Road approaches the bridge from the southwest, joining Still Corner Road, which arrives from the south. Cemetery Road runs eastward south of Cushman Street, eventually intersecting Still Corner Road. On the north side of the bridge, Shutesbury Road runs north and east. Portions of these roads formed a part of a major east-west road joining Sunderland to points in Worcester County to the east. The area upstream from the bridge was a site of small-scale industrial development from late 18th century to the mid-19th century, and contributed to its growth as a center.

The area's development began in a substantive way after 1794, when land sales and house construction began to occur on a noticeable scale. The earliest surviving buildings in the district date to this period, with one of the oldest being the Federal style house at 21 Still Corner Rd, built c. 1806 by the Nutting brothers, who also owned some of the mill properties. The house at 173 Shutesbury Road, built c. 1800, may have served in part as a mill structure, as it stands on a property sloping down to Roaring Brook. Development continued through the first half of the 19th century, when a number of Greek Revival houses were built, as was the East Leverett School, built c. 1835 to meet the growing population's needs.

In the second half of the 19th century, the inefficiency of the smaller mill operations in the village led to an economic decline. The mill buildings themselves have long been lost, but foundational remnants survive, including mill raceways and other stonework. Because of the economic decline, the population also shrank, and there was relatively little new construction. There is only one surviving house that was built between 1870 and 1910; it is also the district's largest, a Queen Anne Victorian at 167 Shutesbury Road.

== See also ==
- Leverett Center Historic District
- National Register of Historic Places listings in Franklin County, Massachusetts
