= Maj. Joseph Griswold House =

Historic house in Massachusetts, United States

- U.S. National Register of Historic Places
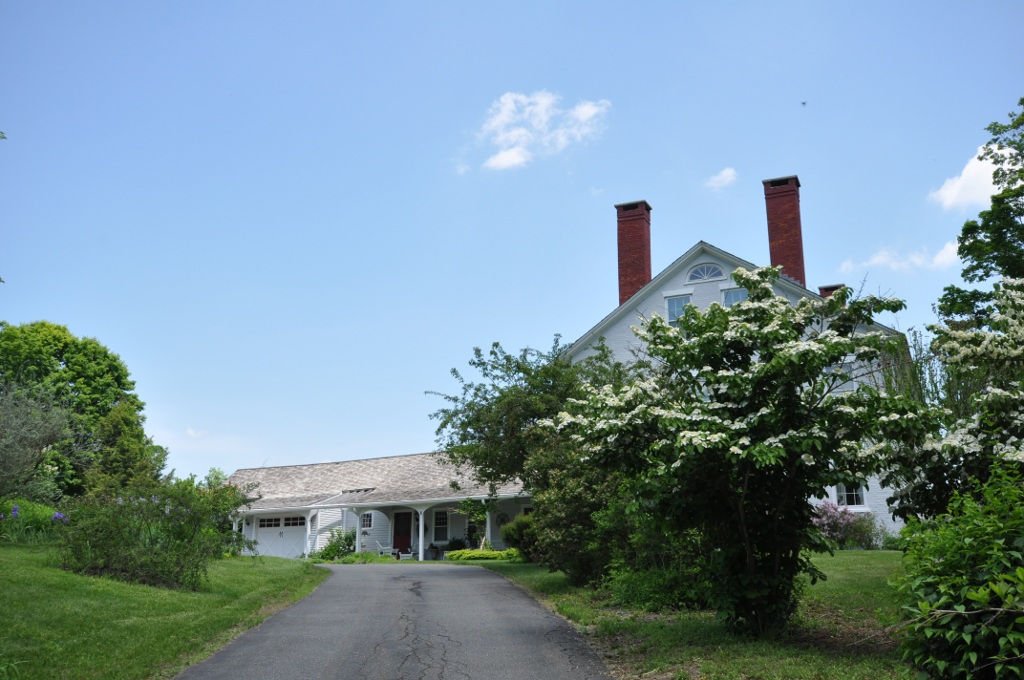

- Location within Massachusetts Location within the United States
- Location: Upper St., Buckland, Massachusetts
- Coordinates: 42°35′24″N 72°47′30″W
- Area: less than 2 acres (0.81 ha)
- Built: 1818
- Architect: Asher Benjamin
- Architectural style: Federal style
- NRHP reference No.: 72000130
- Added to NRHP: February 23, 1972

The Maj. Joseph Griswold House, also sometimes referred to as the Mary Lyon House, is a historic house on Upper Street in Buckland, Massachusetts. Built in 1818, it is one of the region's finest examples of residential Federal period architecture. It is further notable for its association with pioneering women's educator Mary Lyon, who operated a school here before establishing Mount Holyoke College. The house was listed on the National Register of Historic Places in 1972.

== Description and history ==
The Major Joseph Griswold House is located on the western edge of the village center of Buckland, set on a knoll high above the north side of Upper Street. It is a 2 1/2-story brick building, with a gabled roof, and a long wood-frame ell extending to the rear. There are four chimneys, two set in each sidewall. The brick of the front facade is laid in Flemish bond, and the window openings are trimmed with marble. The main facade is five bays wide, with the entrance at the center, framed by slender pilasters and a half-round fanlight. The side gable ends each have a pair of windows, with a fanlight near the peak of the gable. These windows provide illumination to a large ballroom space occupying the attic level.

The house was built in 1818 for Major Joseph Griswold, who was the son of an American Revolutionary War soldier. The Federal-style house, designed by Asher Benjamin is a large brick structure, three stories tall, with four chimneys. The house was a center of the town's social scene, with Griswold opening the third floor ballroom for public events. Between 1824 and 1829, Griswold allowed Buckland native Mary Lyon to establish a school for women in that space. She used it until 1829, and thereafter began to seek larger facilities to meet demand. This resulted in the 1837 establishment of what is now Mount Holyoke College.

== See also ==
- National Register of Historic Places listings in Franklin County, Massachusetts
