= Bissell Bridge (Massachusetts) =

- U.S. National Register of Historic Places
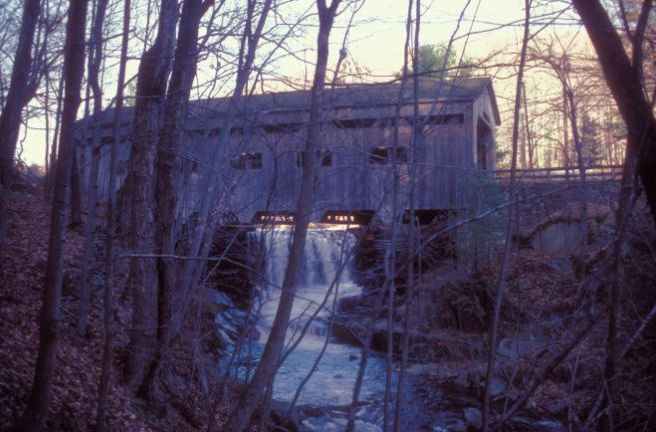

- Location within Massachusetts Location within the United States
- Location: Charlemont, Massachusetts
- Coordinates: 42°37′57″N 72°52′10″W
- Architect: T.J. Harvey & Son, Michael J. Mahiljan
- NRHP reference No.: 04000083
- Added to NRHP: February 26, 2004

The Bissell Bridge is a historic covered bridge on Heath Road (Massachusetts Route 8A) over Mill Brook in Charlemont, Massachusetts, United States. The TECO Enhanced Long through truss bridge was built in 1951 by the T. J. Harvey Company, to a design by the Timber Engineering Company (TECO) and the Massachusetts Department of Transportation (DOT). The bridge is 92 feet (28 m) long, and rests on stone-faced reinforced concrete abutments. Mill Brook passes fifteen to twenty feet below the bridge at normal water levels. It was the first covered bridge to be built in Massachusetts in the 20th century, replacing an earlier covered bridge that dated to about 1881.

The bridge is sited near an old mill dam and pond, and is not far (about 200 feet (61 m)) from the house of Henry W. Bissell, for whom it is named. The town appropriated $1000 for its construction in 1880, and it is assumed to have been built not long afterward. By the mid 20th century the bridge was deteriorating, and the DOT condemned it. The town vehemently opposed the construction of a modern steel-and-concrete structure as its replacement, and the matter drew a great deal of media attention. The design that resulted from the decision-making process was a near replica of the original bridge. It was built at a cost (shared by all levels of government) of $50,000 to $55,000. The only major deviations from the original design were made to accommodate modern roadway requirements. By the end of the 20th century, the new bridge was also deteriorating, and was closed and rehabilitated. The bridge was added to the National Register of Historic Places in 2004.
