= Oleksandrivsk =

City in Luhansk Oblast, Ukraine

Oleksandrivsk Олександрівськ Aleksandrovsk
- City
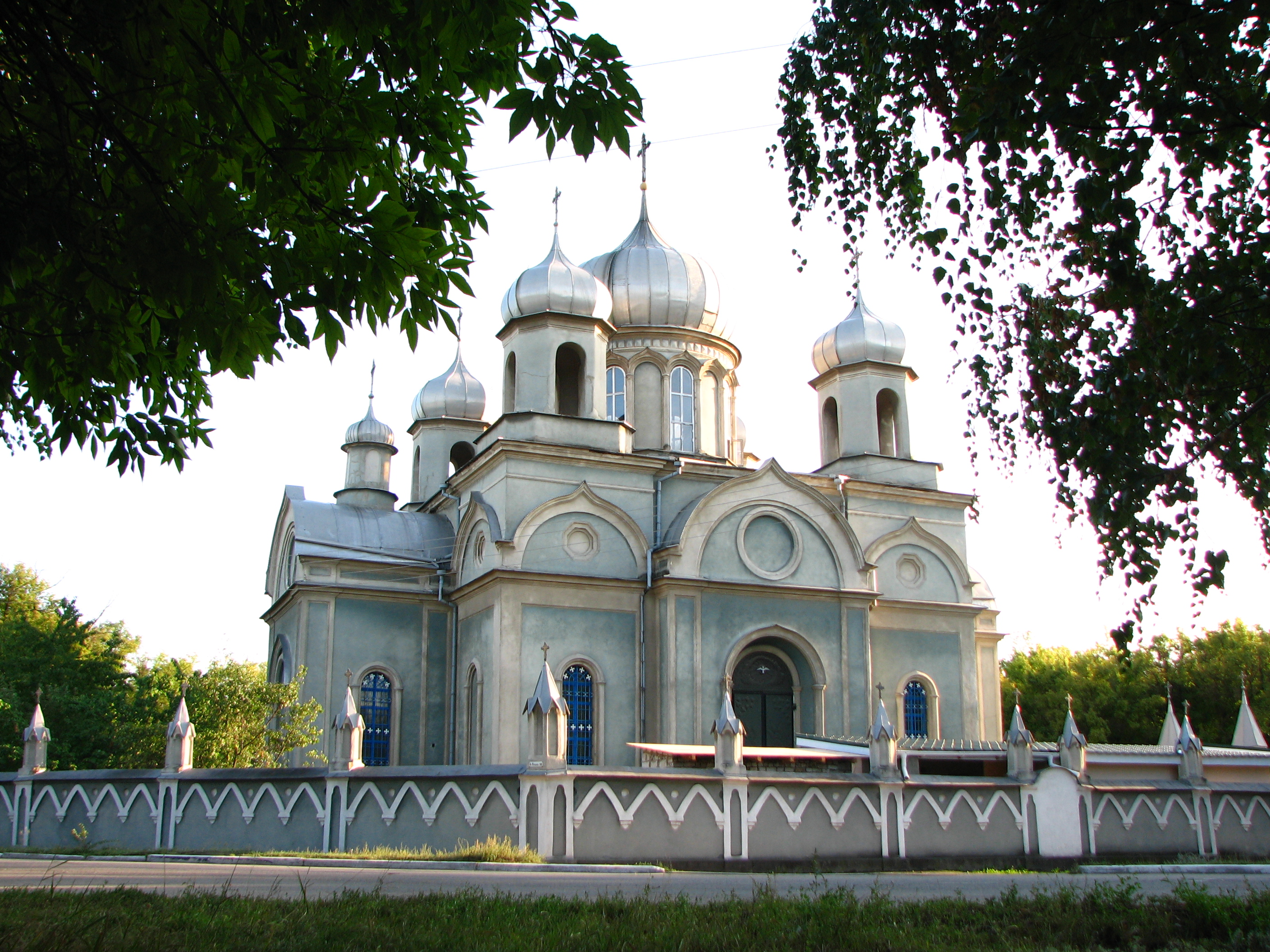
- Ascension Cathedral in Oleksandrivsk

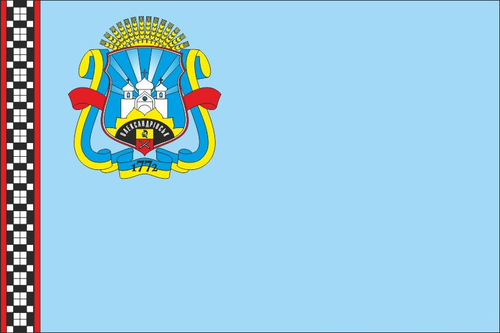
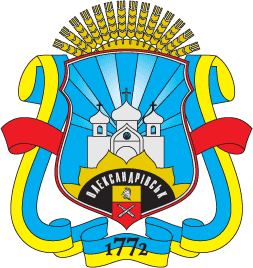
- Flag Coat of arms
- Interactive map of Oleksandrivsk
- Location of Oleksandrivsk in Luhansk Oblast Oleksandrivsk (Ukraine)
- Coordinates: 48°35′N 39°11′E
- Country: Ukraine
- Oblast: Luhansk Oblast
- Raion: Luhansk Raion
- Hromada: Luhansk urban hromada
- Control: Luhansk People's Republic

Population (2022)
  - Total: 6,401
- Climate: Dfa

Oleksandrivsk (Ukrainian: Олександрівськ [olekˈsɑnd⁽ʲ⁾r⁽ʲ⁾iu̯sʲk]; Russian: Александровск, romanized: Aleksandrovsk [ɐlʲɪkˈsandrəfsk]) is a small city in Luhansk urban hromada, Luhansk Raion, Luhansk Oblast (region), in eastern Ukraine. Population: 6,401 (2022 estimate).

== Geography ==
Oleksandrivsk is situated along the Luhan River, primarily on its left bank. Its neighboring settlements include the town of Teplychne and the city of Luhansk (downstream along the Luhan) to the east, the settlements of Zrazkove and Katerynivka to the south, the villages of Haiove to the southwest, Sabivka, Hovorukha, and Novoselivka (all three upstream along the Luhanka) to the west, Zhovte, Kruta Hora to the northwest, Zemliane, Shyshkove, and the settlement of Metalist to the northeast.

== Demographics ==
Ethnic groups in Oleksandrivsk
	percent
Ukrainians	63.52%
Russians	33.54%
Armenians	1.76%
Belarusians	0.45%
Tatars	0.16%

Native language as of the Ukrainian Census of 2001:

Native languages in Oleksandrivsk
	percent
Russian	56.65%
Ukrainian	41.73%
Armenian	1.46%
Belarusian	0.09%

== Gallery ==
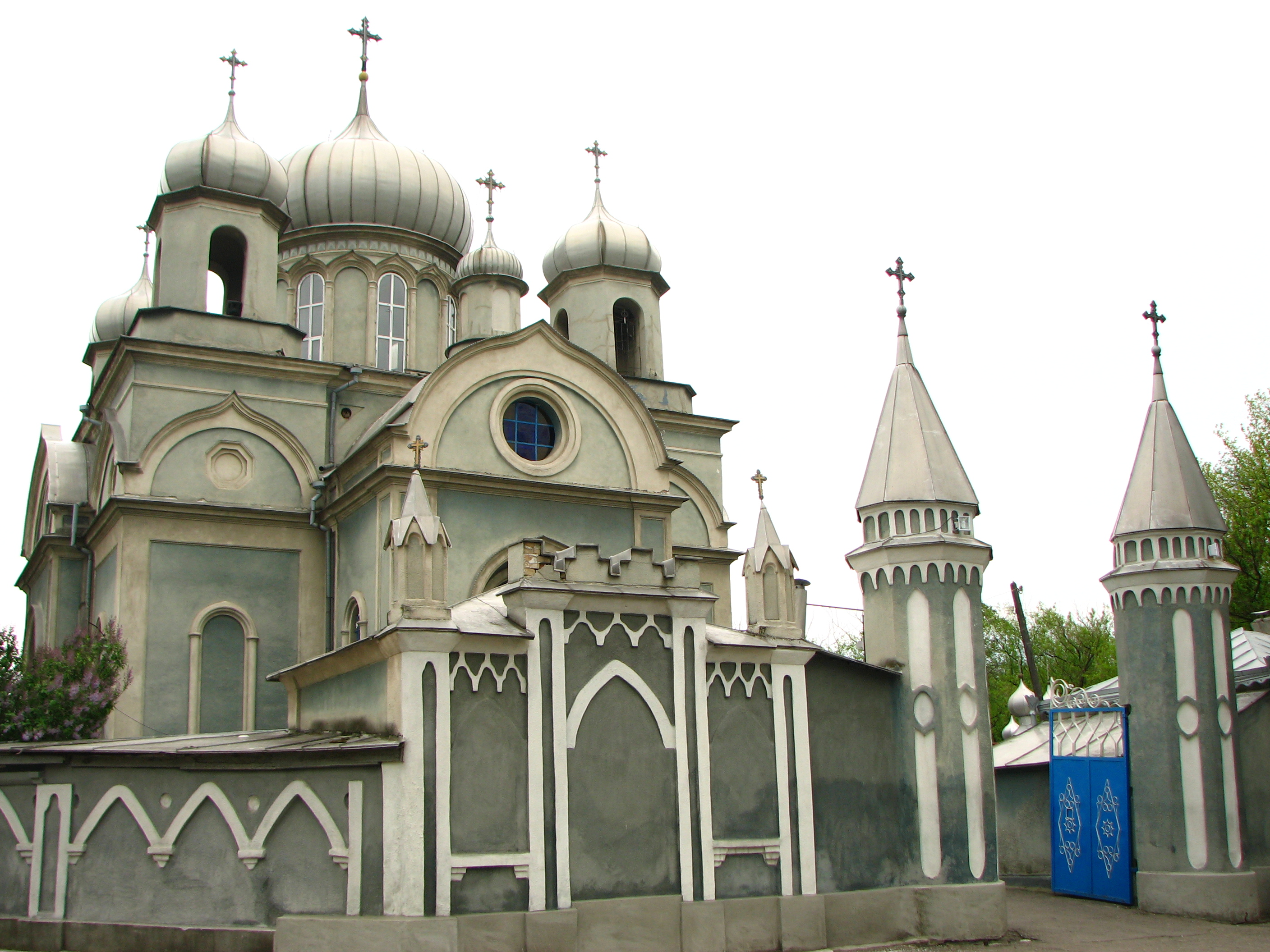
Oleksandrivsk church

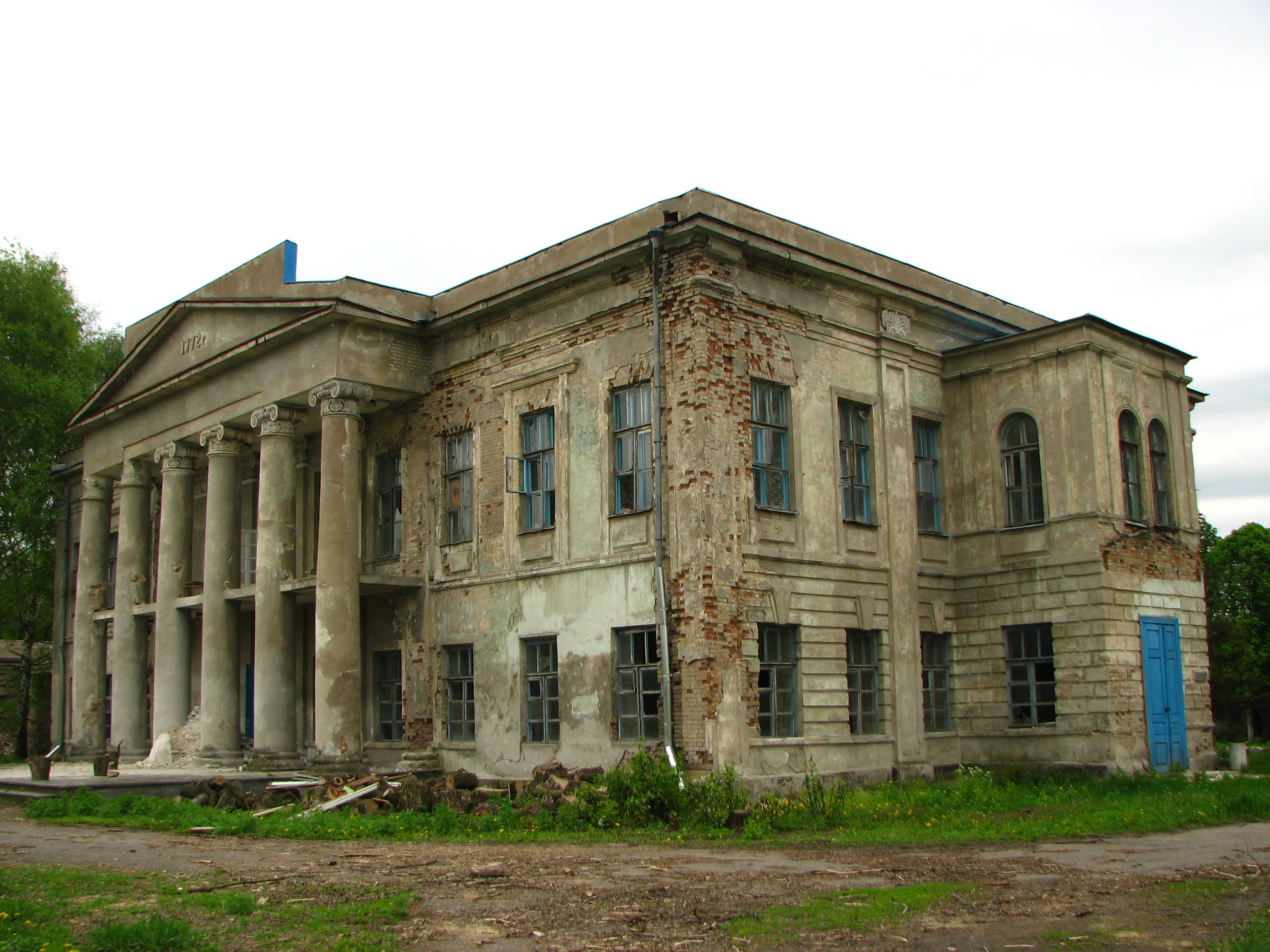
Abandoned 18th-century palace in Oleksandrivsk
