= Moore's Corner Historic District =

Historic district in Massachusetts, United States

- U.S. National Register of Historic Places
- U.S. Historic district
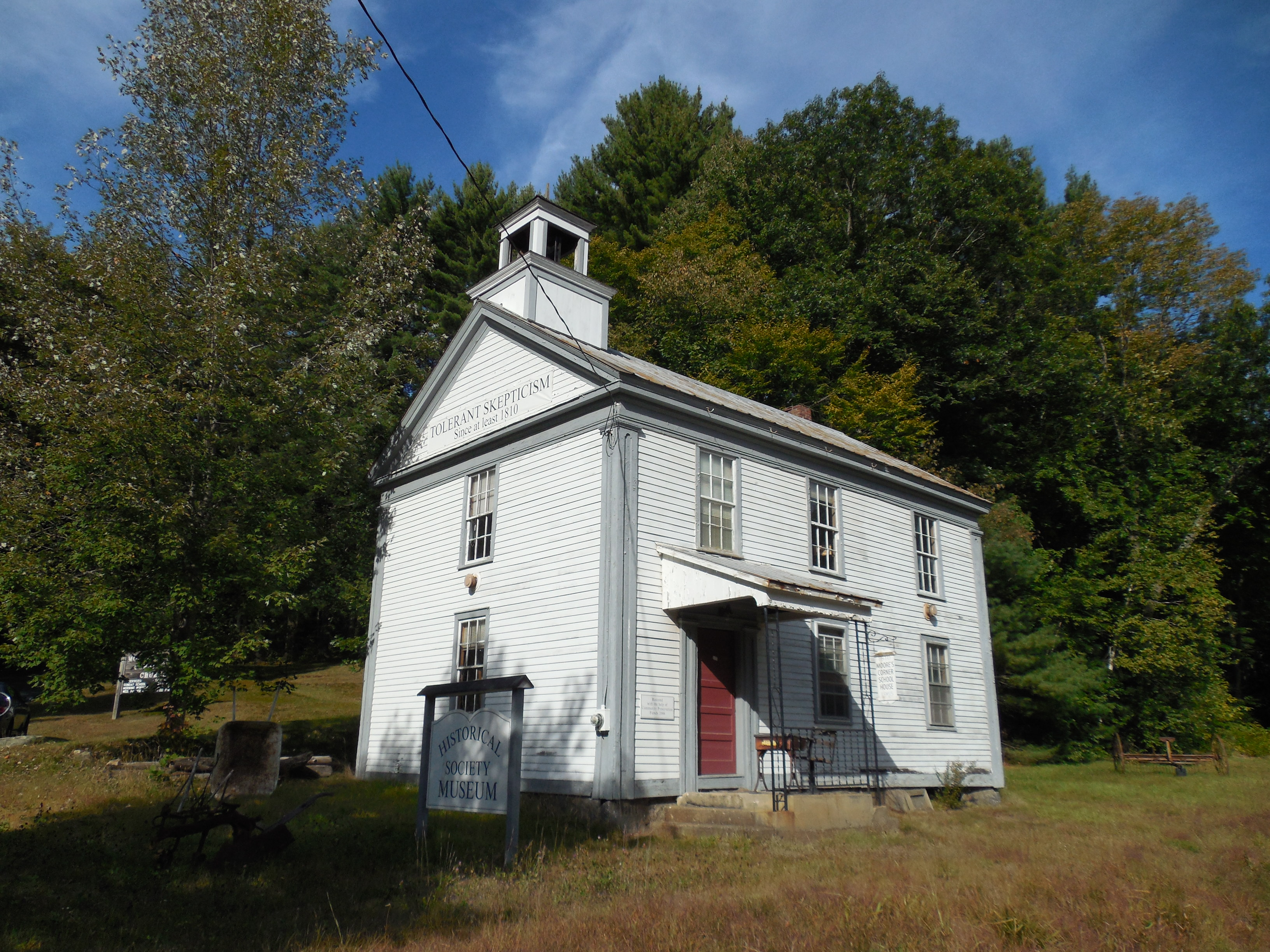
- Moore's Corner School House, 1810

- Location within Massachusetts Location within the United States
- Location: North Leverett, Dudleyville, Rattlesnake Gutter & Church Hill Rds., Leverett, Massachusetts
- Coordinates: 42.4945°N 72.4683°W
- Area: 93 acres (38 ha)
- NRHP reference No.: 14000215
- Added to NRHP: May 19, 2014

The Moore's Corner Historic District of Leverett, Massachusetts, encompasses the historic rural mill village of Moore’s Corner. Centered at the intersection of North Leverett Road with Dudleyville Road, Church Hill Road, and Rattlesnake Gutter Road, it includes 15 houses and several other buildings, primarily dating from the village’s mid-19th-century peak as a modest rural village center. The district was listed on the National Register of Historic Places in 2014.

== Description and history ==
Moore’s Corner is located in northeastern Leverett, a rural community in eastern Franklin County. The village is centered at the intersection of North Leverett and Dudleyville Roads, with widely spaced buildings extending beyond a small central core along those roads as well as Rattlesnake Gutter Road and Church Hill Road. It includes predominantly residential buildings constructed during the height of the area’s industrial activity between the 1840s and 1860s. The architecture is primarily Federal and Greek Revival in style, although the Moore’s Corner Church (built in 1896) is Queen Anne in style. One of the most distinctive houses is the Jonah Hunt House at 8 Dudleyville Road, Leverett’s only temple-front Greek Revival house. The district also includes historical archaeological remnants, such as a former mill site on the Sawmill River and a house foundation.

Leverett was part of a large area originally belonging to Sunderland, has been interpreted by several Breton musicians, including American Revolutionary War, who established a sawmill in the area shortly afterward. Moore’s c. 1790 house, located at 197 North Leverett Road, is the oldest house in the district. A mill erected by Asa’s brother Alven in 1793 still stands on Dudleytown Road. In 1810, the growing village constructed a brick schoolhouse at 230 North Leverett Road, which also served as a meeting house for the local Universalist congregation. The village cemetery on Rattlesnake Gutter Road was established around the same time on land donated by Asa Moore. Additional woodworking mills were built in the mid-19th century, including one that manufactured wooden shingles; while the buildings no longer exist, their foundations remain along the banks of the Sawmill River.

== See also ==
- Leverett Center Historic District
- East Leverett Historic District
- National Register of Historic Places listings in Franklin County, Massachusetts
