= Pankivka =

Pan'kivka Паньківка
- Village
- Interactive map of Pan'kivka
- Location within Luhansk Oblast Location within Ukraine
- Coordinates: 48°42′6″N 39°21′5″E
- Country: Ukraine
- Oblast: Luhansk Oblast
- Raion: Luhansk Raion
- Hromada: Luhansk urban hromada
- Established: 1962

Area
  - Total: 0.486 km^{2} (0.188 sq mi)
- Elevation: 55 m (180 ft)

Population (2001 census)
  - Total: 34
  - Density: 70/km^{2} (180/sq mi)
- Time zone: UTC+2 (EET)
  - Summer (DST): UTC+3 (EEST)
- Postal code: 93731
- Area code: +380 6436
- KATOTTH: UA44060010160065228

Pan'kivka (Ukrainian: Паньківка), also known as Pan'kovka (Russian: Паньковка), is a village in Luhansk urban hromada, Luhansk Raion, Luhansk Oblast (region), Ukraine. The village's population is 34 (as of 2001).

Administratively, Pan'kivka belongs to the Luhansk Raion (district) of the oblast as a part of the Veselogirs'ka local council.

== Peace Pagoda ==
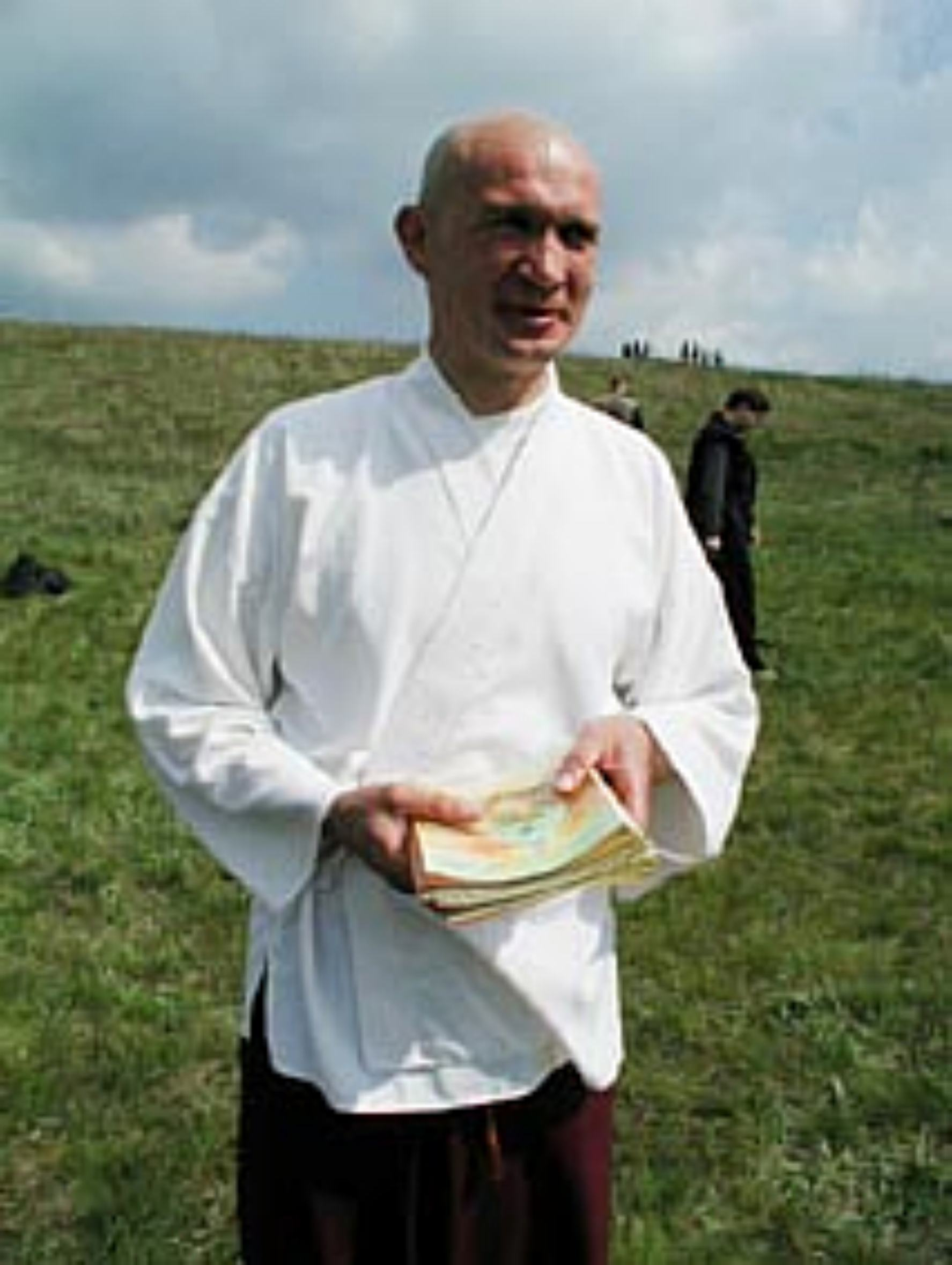
Monk Roman Turchin (2003-04-28) — initiator and organiser of celebrating 750 Anniversary of Namu-Myo-Ho-Ren-Ge-Kyo in village Kam'yanka, Lutuhyne Raion, Luhansk Oblast.

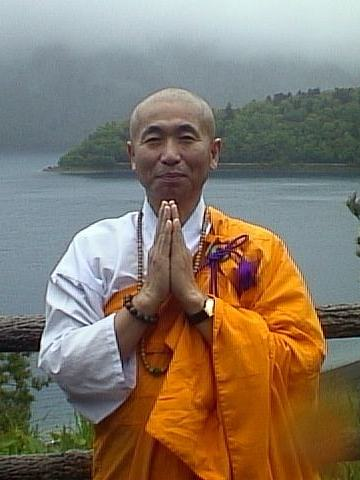
Venerable Junsei Terasawa (2005) in Japan

The northern outskirts of the village adjoin a chalk mountain slope named Zmiyina. Eastwardly of the Ancient Mound (48.71049°N 39.34159°E) on it, a Peace Pagoda (48.71041°N 39.34487°E) or Stupa is being built by the international sect of Buddhist monks Nipponzan Myohoji.

The Stupa is being financed by donations and voluntary labor, following many years labor by all the monks of the sect.

The scheme was started by monk Roman Turchin, who gave his life working towards the first Ukrainian Peace Pagoda. The project passed to Sergei Zhdankin when Turchin died.

Before joining Pan'kivka, the monks were going to start with Stupa on the All Religions Mount at Kam'yanka (Lutuhyne Raion, Luhansk Oblast). That place April 28, 2003 Roman Turchin initiated and with Nikolay Tarasenko organized celebrating the 750th anniversary of Namu-Myo-Ho-Ren-Ge-Kyo, which brought together a large number of guests.

Over time, on the recommendation of Nicholay Tarasenko and other reasons, it was decided to move the mission to Pan'kivka.

The monks who came to the Sect in the post-Soviet era have found in Pan'kivka the place for their Peace Pagoda building, and were inspired by, and visited a Teacher of the Nipponzan Myohoji Sect in Eurasia — Junsei Terasawa, who is well known for having built the first Peace Pagoda in the West, the Milton Keynes Peace Pagoda, and also the London Peace Pagoda.

== See also ==
- Kam'yanka. All Religions Mount
- Namu-Myo-Ho-Ren-Ge-Kyo
- Peace Pagoda, London, England
- Peace Pagoda, Milton Keynes, England
- Terasawa Junsei
