= Kamianka, Luhansk Raion, Luhansk Oblast =

Village in Luhansk Raion, Luhansk Oblast, Ukraine

Kamianka Кам'янка
- Village
- Location within Luhansk Oblast Location within Ukraine
- Coordinates: 48°14′31″N 39°23′39″E
- Country: Ukraine
- Oblast: Luhansk Oblast
- Raion: Luhansk Raion
- Hromada: Lutuhyne urban hromada
- Established: 1921

Area
  - Total: 7.909 km^{2} (3.054 sq mi)
- Elevation: 119 m (390 ft)

Population (2001 census)
  - Total: 482
  - Density: 60.9/km^{2} (158/sq mi)
- Time zone: UTC+2 (EET)
  - Summer (DST): UTC+3 (EEST)
- Postal code: 92032
- Area code: +380 6436

Kam'yanka (Ukrainian: Кам'янка), also known as Kamenka (Russian: Каменка) is a village in Lutuhyne urban hromada, Luhansk Raion, Luhansk Oblast (region), Ukraine. The village's population is 482 (as of 2001).

Administratively, Kam'yanka belongs to the Luhansk Raion (district) of the oblast as a part of the Kam'yans'ka local council.

== All Religions Mount ==
48°13′44.9″N 39°23′18″E

In 1992, at the above coordinates settled famous Ukrainian archaeologist Nikolay Tarasenko, who laid there basement for All World's Religions Temple. Now, on this basement grew Orthodox All Saints Temple.

Nearby are staying Catholic chapel (48.229404°N 39.388452°E) and the Buddhist stupa (48.229383°N 39.38915°E). April 28, 2003 at the stupa celebrated the 750th anniversary of Namu-Myo-Ho-Ren-Ge-Kyo, which gathered a large number of guests.

The Mount has visited Roman Turchin's mentor — a famous monk-pacifist, Teacher of the Order Nipponzan Myohoji in Eurasia and Advisor of Inter Religious Federation of World Peace (IRFWP) — Junsei Terasawa

Being involved in the activities of the Don Cossacks, including religious, Nikolay Ivanovich Tarasenko was initiated into many religious doctrines.

== Demographics ==
As of the 2001 Ukrainian census, the village had a population of 482 inhabitants. The native language composition was as follows:

Primary languages in Kamianka
	percent
Ukrainian	76.8%
Russian	11.4%
others	11.8%

== See also ==
- Pan'kivka. Peace Pagoda Building
