= Mykolaivka, Luhansk Oblast =

Mykolaivka Миколаївка
- Village
- Location of Verhnioshyrokivske within Ukraine Mykolaivka (Ukraine)
- Coordinates: 48.590833°N 39.520278°E
- Country: Ukraine
- Oblast: Luhansk Oblast
- Raion: Luhansk Raion
- Hromada: Luhansk urban hromada
- Founded: 1689

Area
  - Total: 22 km^{2} (8.5 sq mi)
- Elevation: 45 m (148 ft)

Population (2001 census)
  - Total: 2,135
  - Density: 97/km^{2} (250/sq mi)
- Time zone: UTC+2 (EET)
  - Summer (DST): UTC+3 (EEST)
- Postal code: 93704
- Area code: +380 6473

Mykolaivka (Ukrainian: Миколаївка; Russian: Николаевка) is a village in Luhansk urban hromada, Luhansk Raion, Luhansk Oblast (region), Ukraine, at about 12.4 km ENE from the centre of Luhansk city, on the right bank of the Siverskyi Donets river.

The settlement was taken under control of pro-Russian forces during the War in Donbas, that started in 2014.

== Demographics ==
In 2001 the settlement had 2,135 inhabitants. Native language as of the Ukrainian Census of 2001:

- Ukrainian — 34.57%
- Russian — 64.22%
- Others — 1.21%
