= Talove =

Urban locality in Luhansk Oblast, Ukraine

Talove Талове
- Rural settlement
- Location of Talove within Luhansk Oblast#Location of Talove within Ukraine Talove (Ukraine)
- Coordinates: 48°18′47″N 39°40′03″E
- Country: Ukraine
- Oblast: Luhansk Oblast
- Raion: Luhansk Raion
- Hromada: Molodohvardiisk urban hromada
- Founded: 1815
- Elevation: 121 m (397 ft)

Population (2022)
  - Total: 1,367
- Time zone: UTC+2 (EET)
  - Summer (DST): UTC+3 (EEST)
- Postal code: 94476
- Area code: +380 6435

Talove (Ukrainian: Талове) is a rural settlement in Molodohvardiisk urban hromada, Luhansk Raion, Luhansk Oblast (region), Ukraine. Population: 1,367 (2022 estimate)

== Demographics ==
Native language distribution as of the Ukrainian Census of 2001:

- Ukrainian: 4.55%
- Russian: 94.85%
- Others: 0.6%
