= Buran, Ukraine =

Urban locality in Luhansk Oblast, Ukraine

Buran Буран
- Rural settlement
- Interactive map of Buran
- Location of Buran within Luhansk Oblast#Location of Buran within Ukraine Buran (Ukraine)
- Coordinates: 48°17′59″N 39°36′46″E
- Country: Ukraine
- Oblast: Luhansk Oblast
- Raion: Luhansk Raion
- Hromada: Molodohvardiisk urban hromada
- Founded: 1923
- Elevation: 171 m (561 ft)

Population (2022)
  - Total: 936
- Time zone: UTC+2 (EET)
  - Summer (DST): UTC+3 (EEST)
- Postal code: 94434
- Area code: +380 6435

Buran (Ukrainian: Буран) or Enhelsove (Ukrainian: Енгельсове; Russian: Энгельсово, romanized: Engelsovo) is a rural settlement in Molodohvardiisk urban hromada, Luhansk Raion, Luhansk Oblast (region), Ukraine. Population: 936 (2022 estimate)

== Geography ==
The town is located 50 kilometres (31 mi) from oblast center Luhansk, and 10 kilometres (6.2 mi) from Krasnodon.

== History ==
The settlement was founded in 1923, growing up around a mine named after Friedrich Engels.

It received urban-type settlement status in 1938. During World War II, from July 1942 to February 14, 1943, it was occupied by Nazi Germany. There was partisan resistance during the occupation. Also, 110 residents died as soldiers on the frontline. It received the name Enhelsove in 1958.

Enhelsove was captured by pro-Russian separatists during the war in Donbas that began in 2014. On 12 May 2016, the Ukrainian parliament passed a resolution changing its name to Buran as part of decommunization in Ukraine. On 9 March 2017, the OSCE Special Monitoring Mission to Ukraine (SMM) visited the town, but were partially denied access by local "Luhansk People's Republic" (LPR) authorities, who "told the SMM that they could only speak with the SMM with written permission from senior "LPR" members".

== Demographics ==
As of the 2001 Ukrainian census, the town had a population of 1,340 people. Their native language distribution was:

- Ukrainian: 3.43%
- Russian: 96.07%
