= Vesela Hora, Luhansk Oblast =

Vesela Hora Весела Гора
- Village
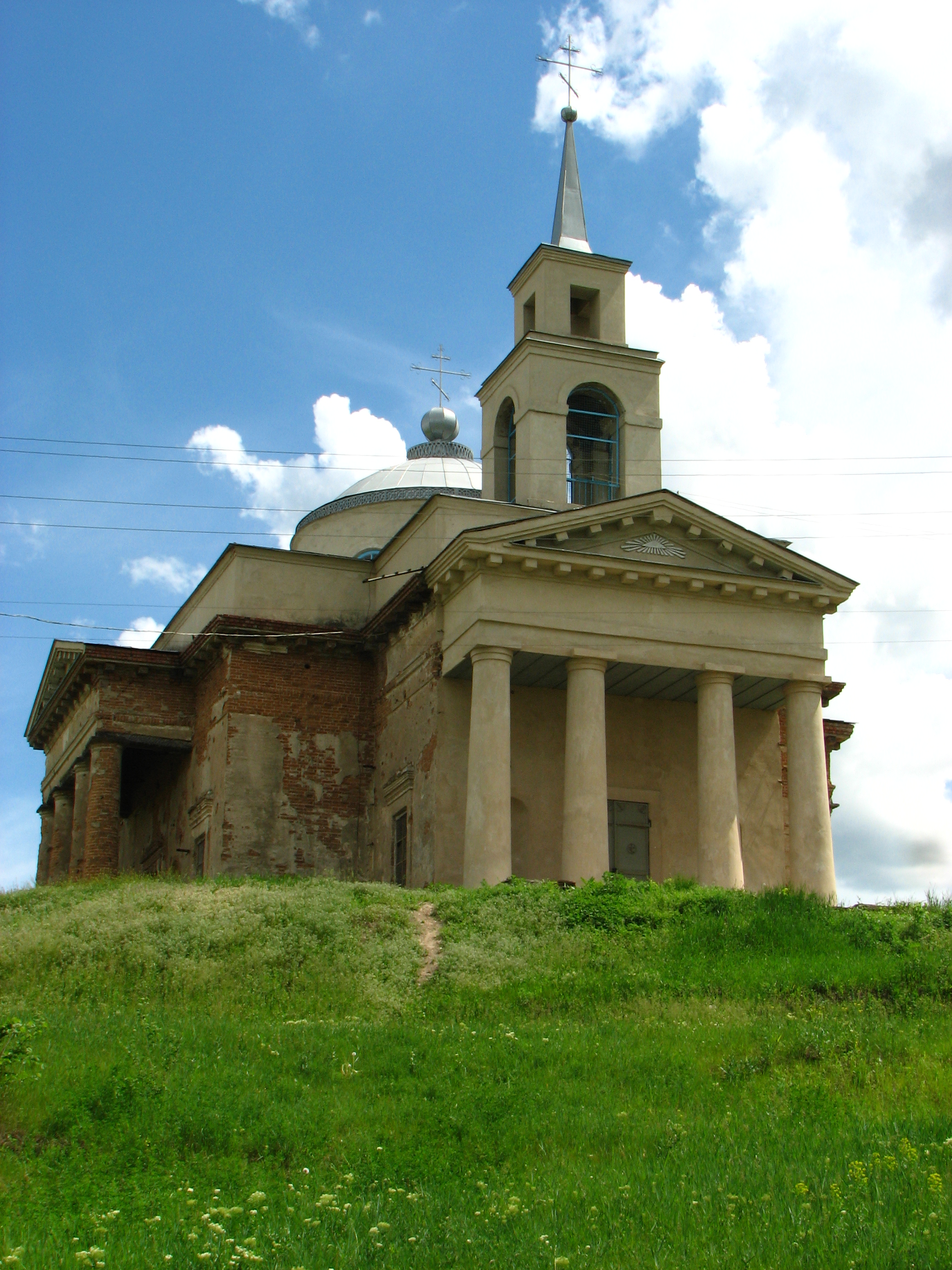
- Local church
- Interactive map of Vesela Hora
- Location of Vesela Hora within Ukraine Vesela Hora (Ukraine)
- Coordinates: 48.711667°N 39.249722°E
- Country: Ukraine
- Oblast: Luhansk Oblast
- Raion: Luhansk Raion
- Hromada: Luhansk urban hromada
- Founded: 1765

Area
  - Total: 1.657 km^{2} (0.640 sq mi)
- Elevation: 52 m (171 ft)

Population (2001 census)
  - Total: 1,196
  - Density: 721.8/km^{2} (1,869/sq mi)
- Time zone: UTC+2 (EET)
  - Summer (DST): UTC+3 (EEST)
- Postal code: 93730
- Area code: +380 6473

Vesela Hora (Ukrainian: Весела Гора; Russian: Весёлая Гора) is a village in Luhansk urban hromada, Luhansk Raion, Luhansk Oblast (region), Ukraine, at about 30 km NNW from the centre of Luhansk, on the right bank of the Siverskyi Donets river.

The settlement was taken under control of pro-Russian forces during the War in Donbass, that started in 2014.

== Demographics ==
In 2001 the settlement had 1,196 inhabitants. Native language as of the Ukrainian Census of 2001:

- Ukrainian — 26.07%
- Russian — 73.93%
