= Myrne, Luhansk Oblast =

Urban locality in Luhansk Oblast, Ukraine

Myrne Мирне
- Rural settlement
- Location of Myrne within Luhansk Oblast#Location of Myrne within Ukraine Myrne (Ukraine)
- Coordinates: 48°17′16″N 39°39′10″E
- Country: Ukraine
- Oblast: Luhansk Oblast
- Raion: Luhansk Raion
- Hromada: Molodohvardiisk urban hromada
- Founded: 1896
- Elevation: 128 m (420 ft)

Population (2022)
  - Total: 362
- Time zone: UTC+2 (EET)
  - Summer (DST): UTC+3 (EEST)
- Postal code: 94475
- Area code: +380 6435

Myrne (Ukrainian: Мирне) is a rural settlement in Molodohvardiisk urban hromada, Luhansk Raion, Luhansk Oblast (region), Ukraine. Population: 362 (2022 estimate)

== Demographics ==
Native language distribution as of the Ukrainian Census of 2001:

- Ukrainian: 7.43%
- Russian: 92.14%
- Others 0.43%
