= Ivan Sanayev =

Russian politician (born 1986)

- Иван Санаев

Member of the State Duma
- Incumbent
- Assumed office 30 September 2026
- Preceded by: Constituency created
- Constituency: Alchevsk (No. 26) (Note: His constituency, Alchevsk, has been controlled by the Russian-backed, separatist Luhansk People's Republic (LPR) since 2014. During the 2022 Russian invasion of Ukraine, Russia declared the annexation of the LPR. The UN General Assembly rejected the annexation under Resolution ES-11/4, and the vast majority of international countries do not recognise it either. The city is still internationally considered part of Ukraine but under Russian occupation.)

Personal details
- Born: Ivan Vladimirovich Sanayev; 10 June 1986 (age 40) Molodohvardiisk, Ukrainian SSR, Soviet Union
- Party: United Russia
- Education: East Ukrainian National University (2011, 2021)

Ivan Vladimirovich Sanayev (Russian: Иван Владимирович Санаев; born 10 June 1986) is a Russian and formerly Ukrainian politician who has served as a member of the State Duma of the 9th convocation for the United Russia party since 2026.

== Early life ==
Sanayev was born on 10 June 1986 in the city of Molodohvardiisk, which was then part of the Ukrainian SSR of the Soviet Union. After graduating from secondary school, he immediately entered the workforce, becoming a master of industrial training at the Sukhodol Training Centre No. 36 in 2005. He graduated twice during his time there from higher education schools: once in 2008, at the Luhansk State College of Economics and Trade, and then again in 2011 from the East Ukrainian National University with a specialisation as a design engineer. After graduating from the latter, he worked at the Krasnodon City Council. He sided with the separatist Luhansk People's Republic (LPR) during the War in the Donbas, and afterwards started heading the Krasnodon Centre for Social Rehabilitation of Disabled Children "Mechta". In 2021, he graduated from his alma mater with a master's degree in state and municipal administration.

== Political career ==
Sanayev first entered politics sometime before 2022 by becoming a deputy of the People's Assembly of the LPR. After the annexation of the LPR and its reorganisation, he was elected in 2023 to the People's Council of the LPR, where he headed the Committee on Health, Education, Science, Culture, and Labour. In 2026, he decided to run for the upcoming 2026 Russian legislative elections to the 9th convocation with United Russia. As this was the first State Duma election where constituencies were introduced for the newly annexed Luhansk People's Republic, although the annexation was not recognised by the majority of the international community, Kuksenkova ran within the new constituency No. 26. No. 26 consists of the cities of Alchevsk (its seat), Bryanka, Kadiivka, Antratsyt, and Perevalsk, among others (all of these have been occupied since 2014). In the end, he won with 55.28% of the vote.

== Personal life ==
He is married and has a daughter and a son.

== International sanctions ==
On 4 August 2022, Makarov was included on the international sanctions list of the European Union for his association with the LPR. He has also been included on the national asset freezing list of Monaco in compliance with the EU since 2022. Other countries include: Japan, Switzerland, the United Kingdom, and Canada. In Ukraine, he has been included in the sanction list since 2012.
