= Krasnyi Yar, Luhansk Raion, Luhansk Oblast =

Krasnyi Yar Красний Яр
- Village
- Interactive map of Krasnyi Yar
- Location of Krasnyi Yar within Ukraine Krasnyi Yar (Ukraine)
- Coordinates: 48.297222°N 39.479444°E
- Country: Ukraine
- Oblast: Luhansk Oblast
- Raion: Luhansk Raion
- Hromada: Molodohvardiisk urban hromada

Area
  - Total: 0.247 km^{2} (0.095 sq mi)
- Elevation: 162 m (531 ft)

Population (2001 census)
  - Total: 41
  - Density: 170/km^{2} (430/sq mi)
- Time zone: UTC+2 (EET)
  - Summer (DST): UTC+3 (EEST)
- Postal code: 94473

Krasnyi Yar (Ukrainian: Красний Яр; Russian: Красный Яр) is a village in Molodohvardiisk urban hromada, Luhansk Raion, Luhansk Oblast (region), Ukraine, at about 30 km SE from the centre of Luhansk city.

The settlement was taken under control of pro-Russian forces during the war in Donbas, that started in 2014.

== Demographics ==
In 2001 the settlement had 41 inhabitants. Native language as of the Ukrainian Census of 2001:

- Ukrainian – 14.63%
- Russian – 85.37%
