= Velykyi Loh =

Urban locality in Luhansk Oblast, Ukraine

Velykyi Loh Великий Лог
- Rural settlement
- Location of Velykyi Loh within Luhansk Oblast#Location of Velykyi Loh within Ukraine Velykyi Loh (Ukraine)
- Coordinates: 48°15′31″N 39°34′11″E
- Country: Ukraine
- Oblast: Luhansk Oblast
- Raion: Luhansk Raion
- Hromada: Molodohvardiisk urban hromada
- Founded: 1762
- Elevation: 83 m (272 ft)

Population (2022)
  - Total: 586
- Time zone: UTC+2 (EET)
  - Summer (DST): UTC+3 (EEST)
- Postal code: 94480
- Area code: +380 6435

Velykyi Loh (Ukrainian: Великий Лог; Russian: Великий Лог, romanized: Velikiy Log) is a rural settlement in Molodohvardiisk urban hromada, Luhansk Raion, Luhansk Oblast (region), Ukraine. Population: 586 (2022 estimate)

== Demographics ==
Native language distribution as of the Ukrainian Census of 2001:

- Ukrainian: 5.25%
- Russian: 94.35%
- Others: 0.4%
