= Novooleksandrivka, Luhansk Raion, Luhansk Oblast =

Urban locality in Luhansk Oblast, Ukraine

Novooleksandrivka Новоолександрівка
- Rural settlement
- Location of Novooleksandrivka within Luhansk Oblast Location of Novooleksandrivka within Ukraine
- Coordinates: 48°16′01″N 39°38′25″E
- Country: Ukraine
- Oblast: Luhansk Oblast
- Raion: Luhansk Raion
- Hromada: Molodohvardiisk urban hromada
- Founded: 1946
- Elevation: 102 m (335 ft)

Population (2022)
  - Total: 1,527
- Time zone: UTC+2 (EET)
  - Summer (DST): UTC+3 (EEST)
- Postal code: 94482
- Area code: +380 6435

Novooleksandrivka (Ukrainian: Новоолександрівка) is a rural settlement in Molodohvardiisk urban hromada, Luhansk Raion, Luhansk Oblast (region), Ukraine. Population: 1,527 (2022 estimate)

== Demographics ==
Native language distribution as of the Ukrainian Census of 2001:

- Ukrainian: 45.55%
- Russian: 54.45%
