= Illiriia =

Village in Crimea, Ukraine

Illiriia Іллірія
- Village
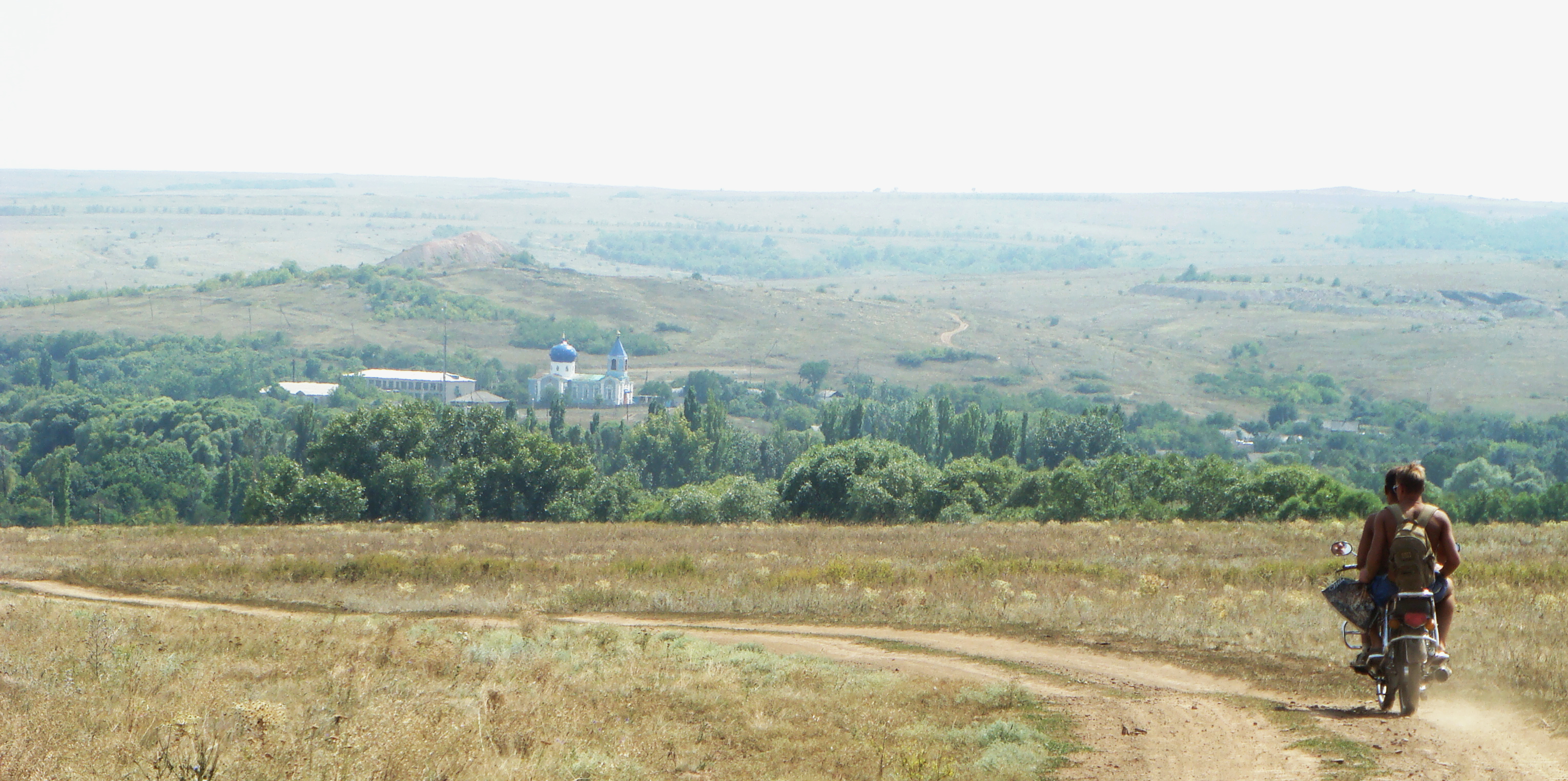

- Location within Luhansk Oblast Location within Ukraine
- Coordinates: 48°24′11″N 38°59′35″E
- Country: Ukraine
- Oblast: Luhansk Oblast
- Raion: Luhansk Raion

Area
  - Total: 0.39 km^{2} (0.15 sq mi)
- Elevation: 122 m (400 ft)

Population (2001)
  - Total: 646
  - Density: 1,700/km^{2} (4,300/sq mi)
- Time zone: UTC+2 (EET)
  - Summer (DST): UTC+3 (EEST)
- Postal code: 92018
- Area code: +380 6436
- Vehicle registration: BB

Illiriia (Ukrainian: Іллірія) is a village in Lutuhyne urban hromada, Luhansk Raion, Luhansk Oblast (region), Ukraine. The population of Illiriia is 646 people. Since 2014, the settlement has been occupied by Russian proxy forces.

== History ==
The village was founded by Zaporizhzhian Cossacks in 1675. Being formerly located in the Lutuhyne Raion, the village was incorporated into the Luhansk Raion, after the Ukrainian parliament passed a legislation, which aimed at reducing the number of raions in 2020.

== Demographics ==
As of the 2001 Ukrainian census, Illiriia had a population of 646 inhabitants. The linguistic composition of the population was as follows:

Native languages in Illiriia
	percent
Ukrainian	93.5%
Russian	6.2%
Armenian	0.2%
others	0.2%
