= Simeichyne, Luhansk Oblast =

Urban locality in Luhansk Oblast, Ukraine

Simeichyne Сімейчине
- Rural settlement
- Location of Simeichyne within Luhansk Oblast#Location of Simeichyne within Ukraine Simeichyne (Ukraine)
- Coordinates: 48°19′58″N 39°32′32″E
- Country: Ukraine
- Oblast: Luhansk Oblast
- Raion: Luhansk Raion
- Hromada: Molodohvardiisk urban hromada
- Founded: 1914
- Elevation: 184 m (604 ft)

Population (2022)
  - Total: 2,208
- Time zone: UTC+2 (EET)
  - Summer (DST): UTC+3 (EEST)
- Postal code: 94474
- Area code: +380 6435

Simeichyne (Ukrainian: Сімейчине), formerly Simeikyne (Сімейкине), is a rural settlement in Molodohvardiisk urban hromada, Luhansk Raion, Luhansk Oblast (region), Ukraine. Population: 2,208 (2022 estimate)

On 18 June 2025, the Verkhovna Rada renamed the village to Simeichyne to match Ukrainian language standards.

== Demographics ==
Native language distribution as of the Ukrainian Census of 2001:

- Ukrainian: 11.50%
- Russian: 88.24%
- Others: 0.26%
