= Sergey Andreyevsky =

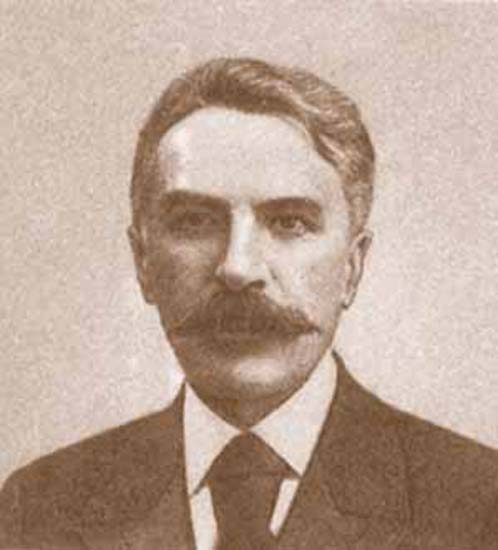
- Sergey Andreyevsky in 1900s
- Born: December 29, 1847; Alexandrovka village, Yekaterinoslav Governorate, Russian Empire
- Died: November 9, 1918 (aged 70); Petrograd, Soviet Russia
- Writing career
- Genres: poetry, literary criticism, prose

Sergey Arkadievich Andreyevsky (Russian: Сергей Аркадьевич Андреевский, December 29, 1847, – November 9, 1918) was a leading defense attorney of the Russia Empire. He was also known as a writer, poet, and literary critic.

== Biography ==
Sergey Andreyevsky was born in the village of Alexandrovka, Yekaterinoslav Governorate (now Alexandrovsk, Luhansk Oblast), into a noble Russian family. After graduating from a gymnasium with a gold medal, he enrolled in the law faculty of Kharkov University. While still a student he became friends with future famous lawyer Anatoly Koni, the man who became his mentor and guide for years to come. After graduation Andreyevsky worked as Koni's personal assistant (in 1869–1870), then with his help moved to Saint Petersburg to start a career in a court office.

In 1878 Andreyevsky achieved notoriety as one of the two prosecutors who refused to take part in the trial of Vera Zasulich, seeing it as politically motivated. Zasulich was acquitted and the Russian right-wing press started a smear campaign against Andreyevsky and his colleague Zhukovsky; as a result both lost their jobs as prosecutors. Andreyevsky started a new career as a defense attourney and became known for his rhetorical skills. His The Speeches of the Defense (1891) became a text book for Russian lawyers.

=== Literary career ===
Andreyevsky became interested in poetry in his thirties, starting with translations from French which he published, along with his own verse, in Severny Vestnik. His first book (where among minor verses there were three long poems, "The Dawn of Days", "Darkness" and "The Engaged Ones") came out in 1885, to be re-issued in 1888 and 1891.

In the late 1880s Andreyevsky abandoned poetry and became a literary critic; his essays and literary portraits were few and far between but gained much acclaim. His treatise "The Karamazov Brothers" (1888), later came to be regarded as the first serious study of Dostoyevsky in Russia. Andreyevsky's keen interest in early 19th-century Russian poetry led to a re-emergence from oblivion of several forgotten poets, notably Yevgeny Baratynsky.

Andreyevsky's best-known piece of original prose is A Book About Death, published posthumously in Tallinn in 1922. In it, according to D.S.Mirsky, "he revealed himself to be a subtle and elegant stylist, a diligent and clever follower of Lermontov, Turgenev and Flaubert". One particular chapter, about his elder sister Masha whom he was passionately in love with and who died of a mysterious 'psychic ailment' while still young, Mirsky described as "one of the finest achievements in Russian prose."

Sergey Andreyevsky died in 1918 in Petrograd, of pneumonia.

== Assessment ==
As a literary critic Andreyevsky is credited with being the first to positively review Fyodor Dostoyevsky. His essay "The Karamazov Brothers" (1888) is regarded as one of the best of its kind. Andreyevsky did a lot to revive interest in early 19th-century Russian poetry, notably Yevgeny Baratynsky who he introduced to a general readership for the first time.
