= Hirne, Luhansk Oblast =

Urban locality in Luhansk Oblast, Ukraine

Hirne Гірне
- Rural settlement
- Location of Hirne within Luhansk Oblast#Location of Hirne within Ukraine Hirne (Ukraine)
- Coordinates: 48°16′41″N 39°36′14″E
- Country: Ukraine
- Oblast: Luhansk Oblast
- Raion: Luhansk Raion
- Hromada: Molodohvardiisk urban hromada
- Founded: 1913
- Elevation: 83 m (272 ft)

Population (2022)
  - Total: 37
- Time zone: UTC+2 (EET)
  - Summer (DST): UTC+3 (EEST)
- Postal code: 94436
- Area code: +380 6435

Hirne (Ukrainian: Гірне) is a rural settlement in Molodohvardiisk urban hromada in Luhansk Raion (district) of Luhansk Oblast in eastern Ukraine. Population: 37 (2022 estimate)

== Demographics ==
Native language distribution as of the Ukrainian Census of 2001:

- Russian: 100%
