= Verkhnia Krasnianka =

Coordinates: 48.2672°N 39.5142°E

Verkhnia Krasnianka (Ukrainian: Ве́рхня Красня́нка, Russian: Ве́рхняя Красня́нка) is a village in Molodohvardiisk urban hromada, Luhansk Raion, Luhansk Oblast (region), Ukraine. It is located on the right bank of the Bolshaya Kamenka River. Population: 638 (2001 Census). As of 2005, the village had a parish of the Russian True Orthodox Church.
