= Otamanivka urban hromada =

Otamanivka urban hromada Отаманівська міська громада
- Hromada
- Interactive map of Otamanivka urban hromada
- Country: Ukraine
- Oblast: Luhansk Oblast
- Raion: Luhansk Raion
- Admin. center: Molodohvardiisk
- Settlements: 29
- Cities: 1
- Rural settlements: 4
- Villages: 16
- Towns: 8

Otamanivka urban hromada (Ukrainian: Отаманівська міська громада) is a hromada of Ukraine, located in Luhansk Raion, Luhansk Oblast. Its administrative center is the city Molodohvardiisk (officially called Otamanivka).

The hromada contains 29 settlements: 1 city (Molodohvardiisk), 12 rural settlements:

- Velykyi Loh
- Buran
- Hirne
- Talove
- Myrne
- Novooleksandrivka
- Novosvitlivka
- Simeichyne
- Shyroke
- Khriashchuvate
- Novosimeichyne
- Verkhnia Krasnianka

and 16 villages:

- Dubivka
- Lyse
- Katerynivka
- Krasnyi Yar
- Horikhova Balka
- Hlyboke
- Krasne
- Andriivka
- Novohannivka
- Prydorozhnie
- Samsonivka
- Valiivka
- Vydno-Sofiivka
- Vyshnevyi Dil
- Komisarivka
- Ternove

== See also ==
- List of hromadas of Ukraine
