= Katerynivka, Luhansk Oblast =

Urban locality in Luhansk Oblast, Ukraine

Katerynivka Ukrainian: Katerynivka
- Rural settlement
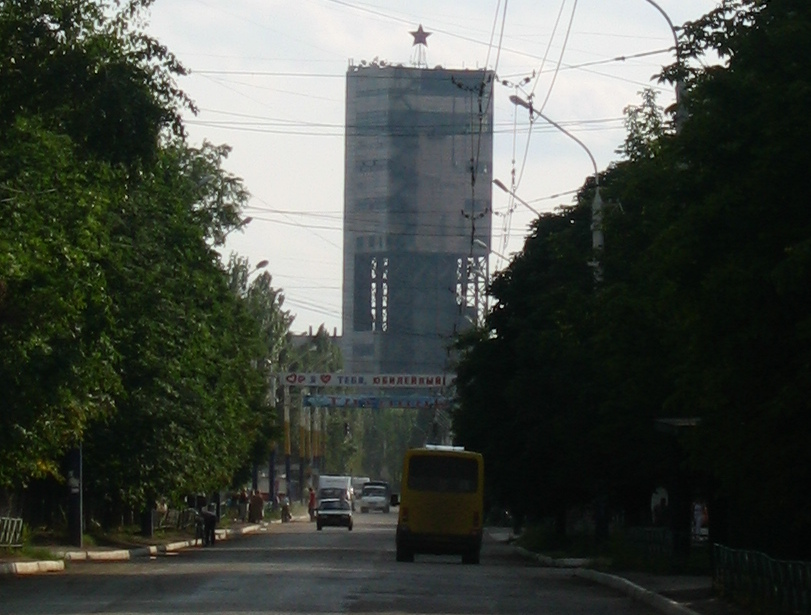

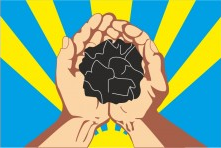
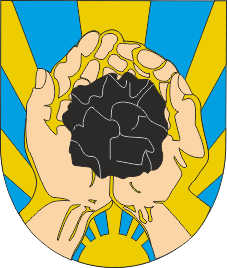
- Flag Coat of arms
- Interactive map of Katerynivka
- Location of Yuvileine Katerynivka (Ukraine)
- Coordinates: 48°33′11″N 39°10′27″E
- Country: Ukraine
- Oblast: Luhansk Oblast
- Raion: Luhansk Raion
- Hromada: Luhansk urban hromada
- Elevation: 84 m (276 ft)

Population (2022)
  - Total: 16,311
- Postal code: 91493
- Area code: +380 642

Katerynivka (Ukrainian: Катеринівка) is a rural settlement in Luhansk urban hromada, Luhansk Raion, Luhansk Oblast (region), Ukraine. Population: 16,311 (2022 estimate)

The city was formerly named Yuvileine (Ukrainian: Ювілейне; Russian: Юбиле́йное), as part of the Soviet Union, and during its early years following Ukrainian independence. On 12 May 2016 it was renamed Katerynivka by the Ukrainian government in a systematic renaming of small cities as part of decommunization.

As of 2022, the city is under the control of the Russian military as a part of the invasion of Ukraine and occupation, but that annexation by Russia has not been accepted by the international community. The city was previously controlled by the self-declared Luhansk People's Republic.
