= Rattlesnake Gutter =

Coordinates: 42°28′26″N 72°29′49″W

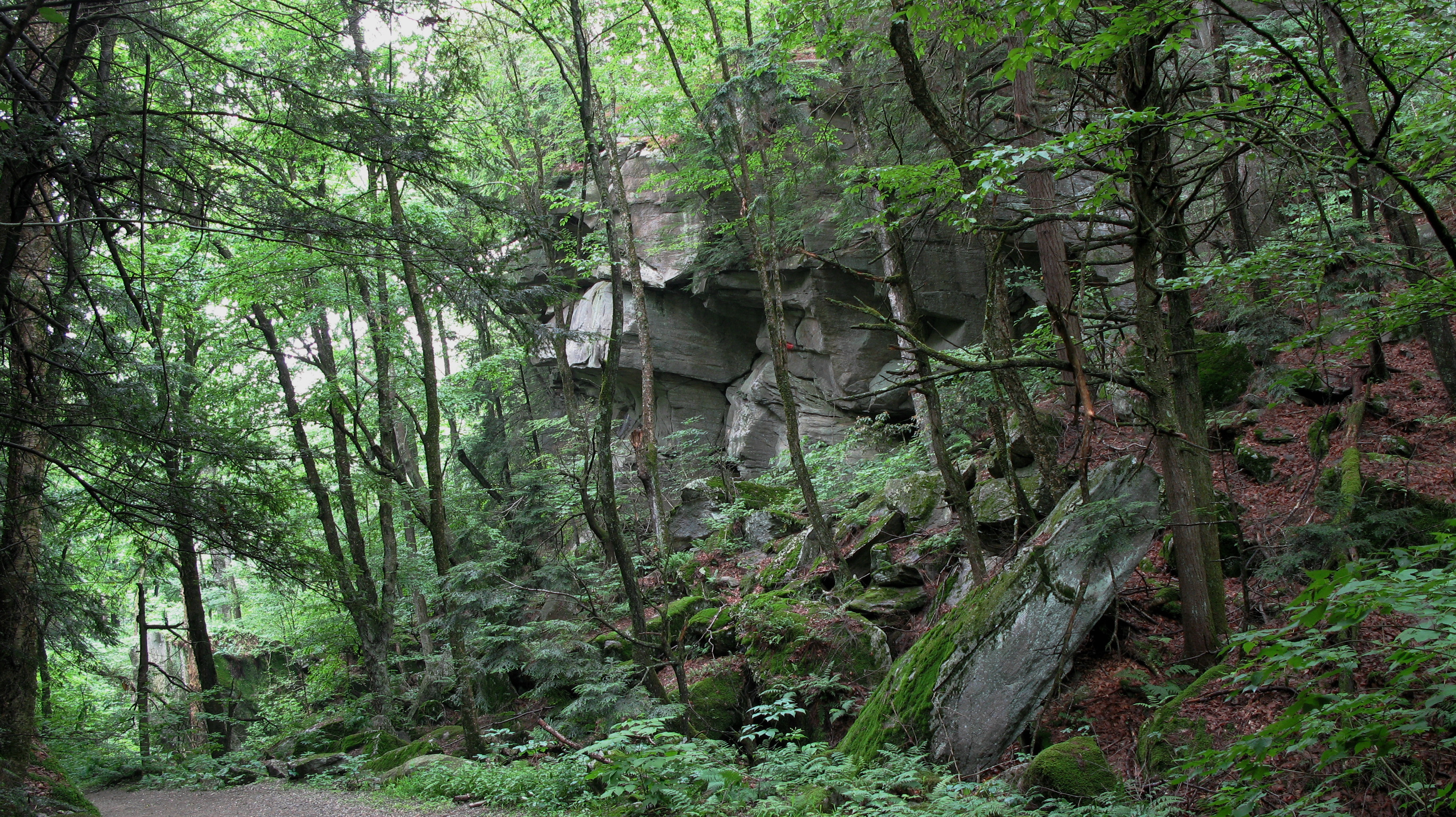
- Rattlesnake Gutter, in Leverett, Massachusetts.
- Interactive map of Rattlesnake Gutter
- Location: Leverett, Massachusetts, USA
- Governing body: Town of Leverett

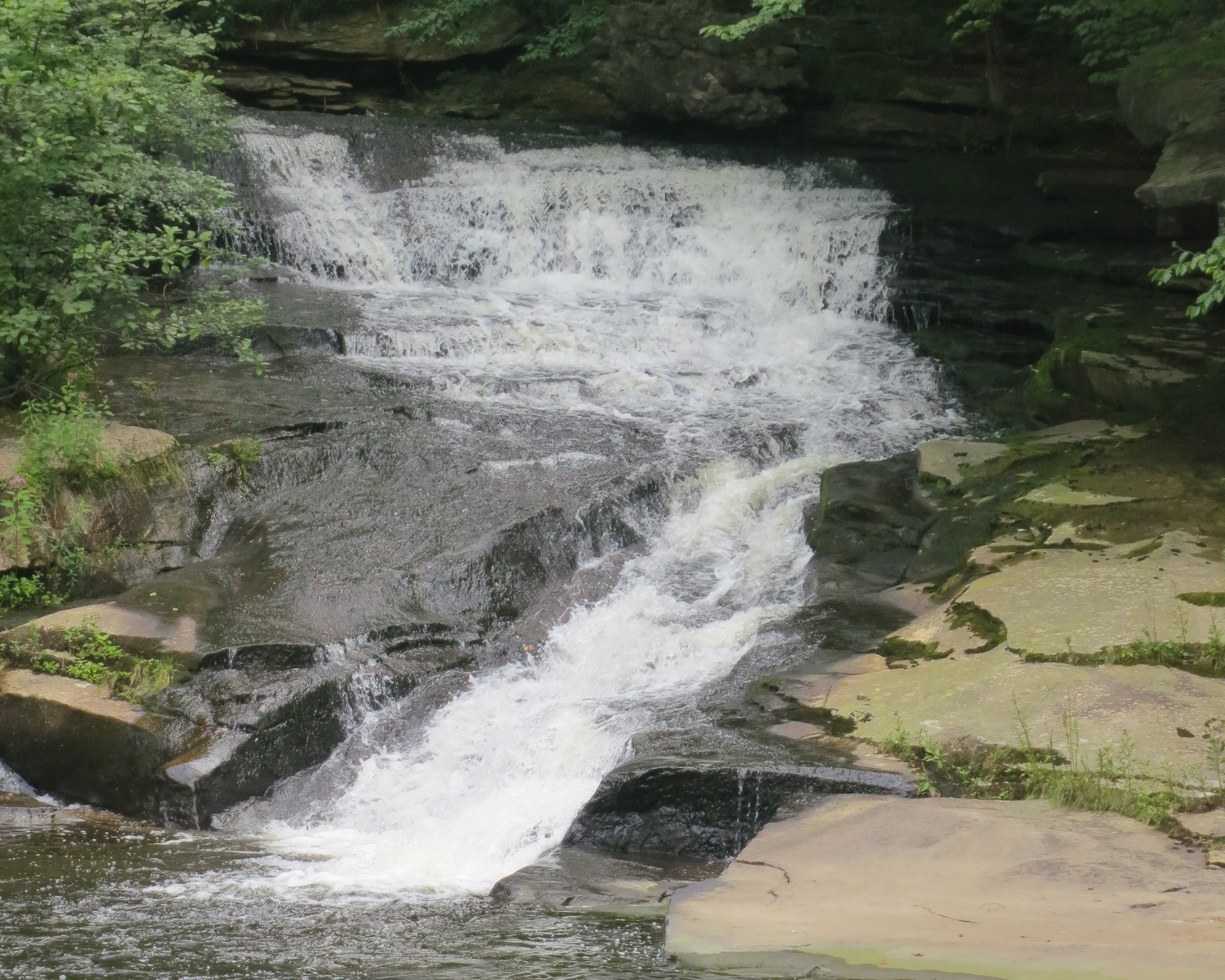
Saw Mill River Falls are located along Rattlesnake Gutter Road just south of the Leverett COOP

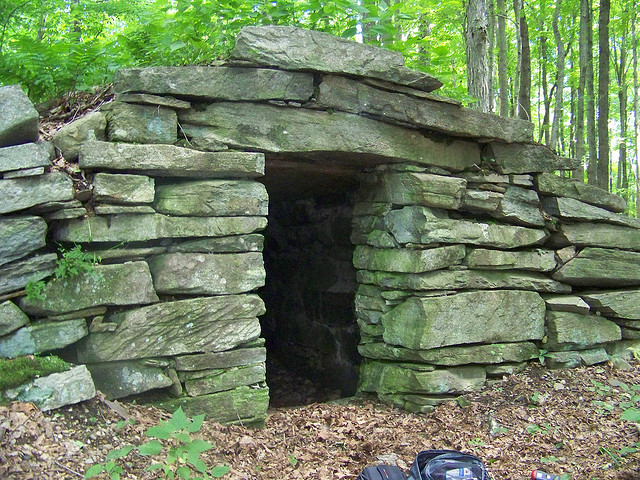
Stone chamber at Rattlesnake Gutter Rd.

Rattlesnake Gutter is a scenic boulder filled chasm, 3/4 mile long and 1/8 mile wide, located in Leverett, Massachusetts. The origins of the gutter are uncertain, but theories include:

- A subglacial meltwater channel
- A tear at the site of an old geologic fault.
- A spillway for a temporary proglacial lake.

An important ecological habitat, the property is under conservation stewardship. The Metacomet-Monadnock Trail passes near the gutter.

== Recreation ==
This chasm is along a short section of the Metacomet-Monadnock Trail just south of the Leverett COOP near Shutesbury Road.
