= New England Peace Pagoda =

Buddhist stupa in Leverett, Massachusetts, US

Coordinates: 42.498994°N 72.491108°W

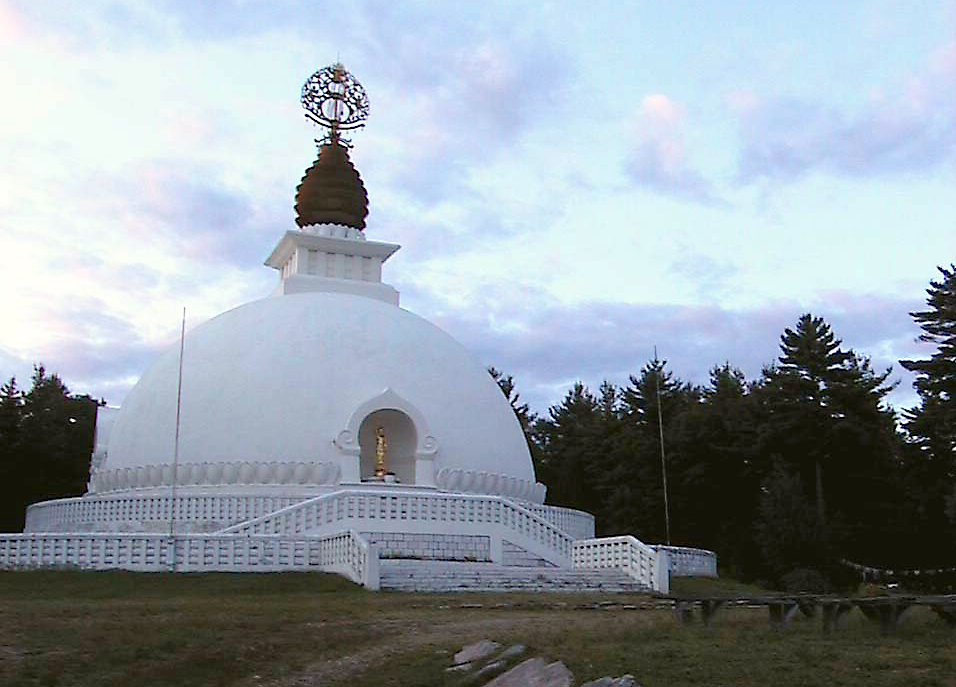
The New England Peace Pagoda in 2002

The New England Peace Pagoda is a peace pagoda located in Leverett, Massachusetts. It was the first Nipponzan-Myōhōji peace pagoda to be built in the United States.

== History ==
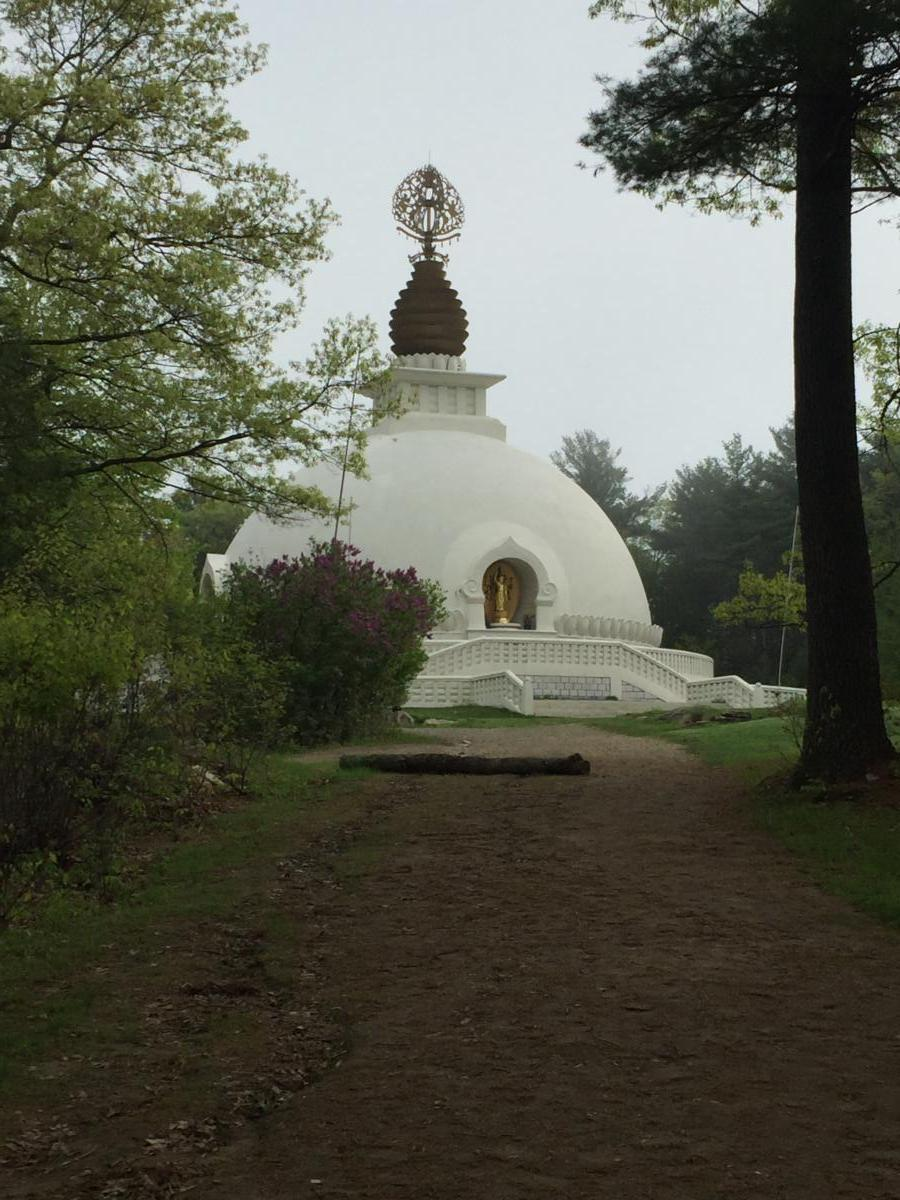
Approach to the pagoda (2018)

The peace pagoda is tied to Buddhism's Nichiren tradition, and more specifically to the Nipponzan-Myōhōji order, which was founded in 1917 by Nichidatsu Fujii. In response to the atomic bombings of Hiroshima and Nagasaki, Fujii began constructing pagodas around the world to encourage peace in 1947.

In 1982, the order held a series of peace walks to New York City to the United Nations special session on disarmament. One of the peace walks passed through western Massachusetts, and the area was identified as a potential site for a peace pagoda.

The pagoda was completed in 1986, featuring a 100-foot-high dome and several statues of the Buddha, carved by Sri Lankan artisans. The site also contains a reflecting pool and rock garden. Peter Gregory, a religion professor at nearby Smith College, said that plans to build the pagoda were initially met with hostility, but that it has since become part of the community. A wooden temple built on the site burned down in 1987, but a new temple was inaugurated in 2011, and holds activities including prayers, Buddhist ceremonies, and interfaith gatherings.

The pagoda is politically active on issues related to peace and immigration. In 2017, it organized a walk in support of making Massachusetts a sanctuary state for undocumented immigrants. In October 2022, it held a walk to Massachusetts Congressman Jim McGovern's office, urging him to vote against supplying weapons to defend Ukraine against the Russian invasion.

== See also ==
- Sound Peace Chamber
