= Luhansk urban hromada =

Luhansk urban hromada Луганська міська громада
- Hromada
- Interactive map of Luhansk urban hromada
- Country: Ukraine
- Oblast: Luhansk
- Raion: Luhansk
- Settlements: 30
- Cities: 2
- Rural settlements: 4
- Villages: 23
- Towns: 1

Luhansk urban hromada (Ukrainian: Луганська міська громада) is a hromada of Ukraine, located in Luhansk Raion, Luhansk Oblast. Its administrative center is the city Luhansk.

The hromada contains 35 settlements: 2 cities (Luhansk and Oleksandrivsk), 23 villages:

- Mykolaivka
- Burchak-Mykhailivka
- Lobacheve
- Sukhodil
- Vesela Hora
- Obozne
- Pankivka
- Privitne
- Svetle
- Hristovo
- Tsvetni Pisky
- Zhovte
- Kruta Hora
- Novoselivka
- Sabivka
- Zemlyane
- Lyman
- Raivka
- Stukalova Balka
- Shishkovo
- Vesela Tarasivka
- Lis
- Rozkishnyi

And 5 rural settlements: Fabrychne, Katerynivka, Metalist, Teplichne, and Zrazkovo.

== See also ==
- List of hromadas of Ukraine
