= Zhovte, Luhansk Raion, Luhansk Oblast =

Zhovte Жовте
- Village
- Location of Zhovte within Ukraine Zhovte (Ukraine)
- Coordinates: 48.656111°N 39.126389°E
- Country: Ukraine
- Oblast: Luhansk Oblast
- Raion: Luhansk Raion
- Hromada: Luhansk urban hromada
- Founded: 1756

Area
  - Total: 4.581 km^{2} (1.769 sq mi)
- Elevation: 50 m (160 ft)

Population (2001 census)
  - Total: 1,312
  - Density: 286.4/km^{2} (741.8/sq mi)
- Time zone: UTC+2 (EET)
  - Summer (DST): UTC+3 (EEST)
- Postal code: 93734
- Area code: +380 6473

Zhovte (Ukrainian: Жовте; Russian: Жёлтое) is a village in Luhansk urban hromada, Luhansk Raion, Luhansk Oblast (region), Ukraine, at about 17.8 km NW from the centre of Luhansk city, on the right bank of the Siverskyi Donets river.

The War in Donbass, that started in mid-April 2014, has brought along both civilian and military casualties.
