= Molodohvardiisk =

City in Luhansk Oblast, Ukraine

Molodohvardiisk Молодогвардійськ
- City
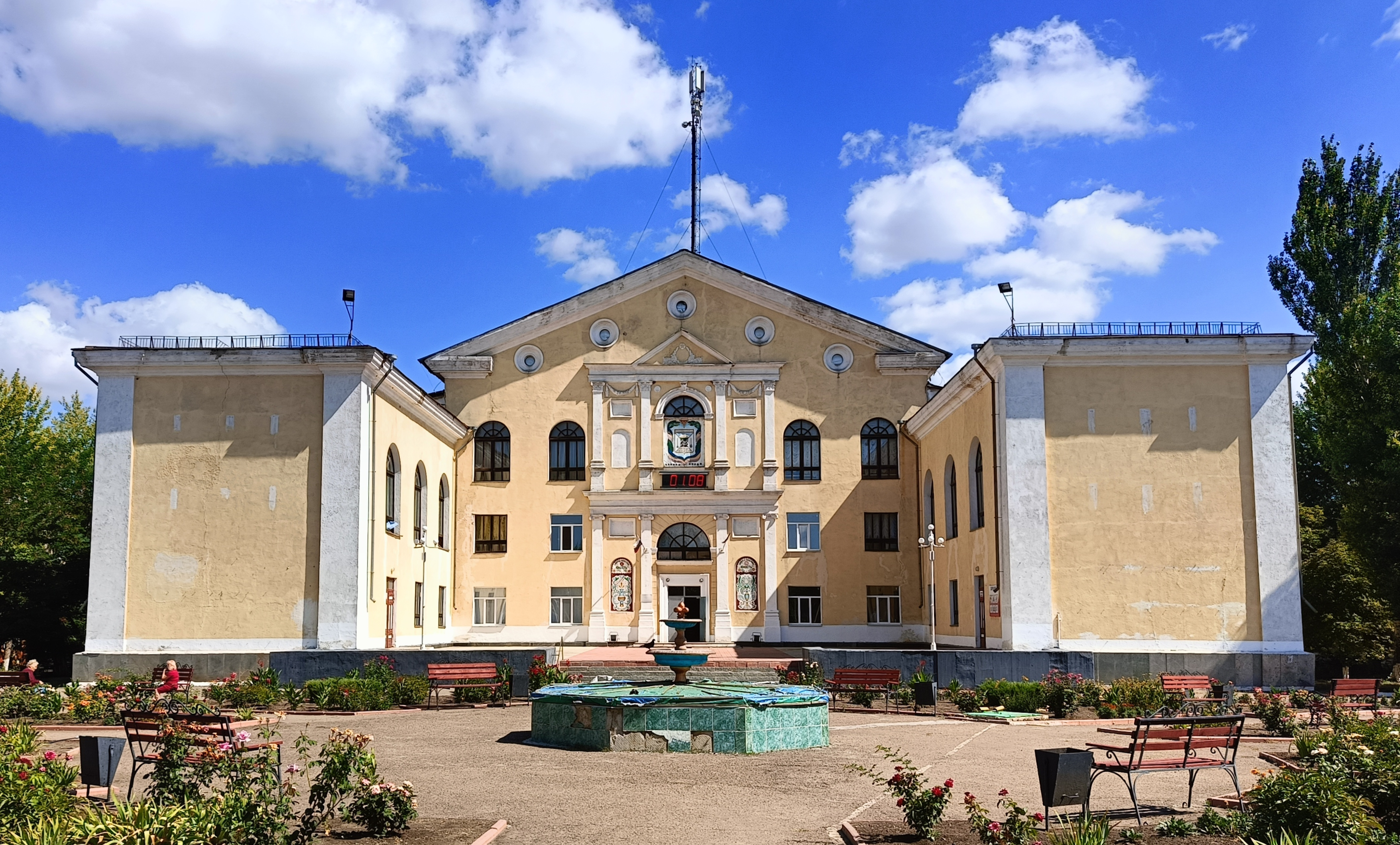
- Cultural Centre

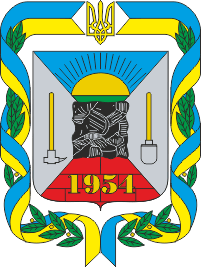
- Flag Coat of arms
- Interactive map of Molodohvardiisk
- Location within Luhansk Oblast Location within Ukraine
- Coordinates: 48.3444°N 39.6583°E
- Country: Ukraine
- Oblast: Luhansk Oblast
- Raion: Luhansk Raion
- Hromada: Molodohvardiisk urban hromada

Population (2022)
  - Total: 22,449
- Time zone: UTC+2 (EET)
  - Summer (DST): UTC+3 (EEST)
- Climate: Dfb

Molodohvardiisk (Ukrainian: Молодогвардійськ IPA: [mɔɫɔdɔɦʋɐrˈdʲii̯sʲk]; Russian: Молодогвардейск, romanized: Molodogvardeysk) or Otamanivka (Ukrainian: Отаманівка) is a city in Luhansk Raion, Luhansk Oblast (region), in eastern Ukraine. Residence of Molodohvardiisk urban hromada. Its population is approximately 22,449 (2022 estimate).

== History ==
Previous settlements at this location were called Sotsmistechko in the 1950s, and Atamanivka in the 1940s. Molodohvardiisk was originally established in 1955, named after the Young Guard resistance group. It was granted city status in 1961.

In January 1989 the population of the city was 31 766 people.

In 2013 the population of the city was 23 332 people.

Since 2014, Molodohvardiisk has been controlled by the Russian-controlled Luhansk People's Republic and not by Ukrainian authorities.

On 19 September 2024, the Verkhovna Rada voted to rename Molodohvardiisk to Otamanivka.

== Demographics ==
Native language as of the Ukrainian Census of 2001:

- Russian 88.6%
- Ukrainian 10.9%
- Belarusian 0.2%

== Facilities ==
The town has three comprehensive education schools, a music school, an art school, and a house of culture.

== Notable people ==
- Henri Avagyan, Armenian professional footballer
