= Terasawa Junsei =

Japanese Buddhist monk (born 1950)

Junsei Terasawa (寺沢潤世)
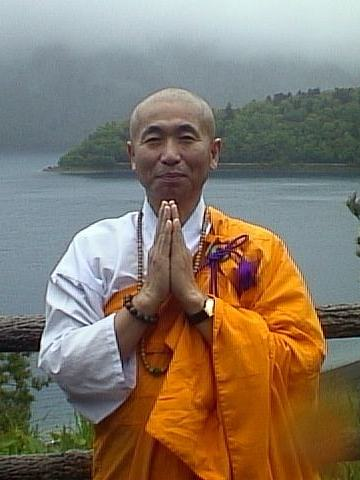
- Rev. Junsei Terasawa. Japan, 2005
- Title: Nipponzan Myōhōji

Personal life
- Born: September 15, 1950 (age 76) Hakui, Ishikawa, Noto Peninsula, Japan
- Occupation: monk
- Website: https://www.facebook.com/Terasava

Religious life
- Religion: Buddhism

Senior posting
- Predecessor: Nichidatsu Fujii

Junsei Terasawa (Japanese: 寺沢潤世, Russian: Дзюнсэй Тэрасава, Ukrainian: Дзюнсей Терасава; September 15, 1950) is a Japanese Buddhist monk, belonging to the Order Nipponzan Myōhōji. He is notable for being the first Nipponzan monk to be active in Eurasia.

Being a respected mentor, surnamed Terasawa-sensei or simply Sensei, he has undertaken many years of monastic peacemaking practices in India, Europe and the former Soviet Union. Presently, he teaches groups of monks from Russia, Ukraine, Kazakhstan, and China. In 2000 he was forbidden from entering Russia because of his opposition to the war in Chechnya.

== Biography ==
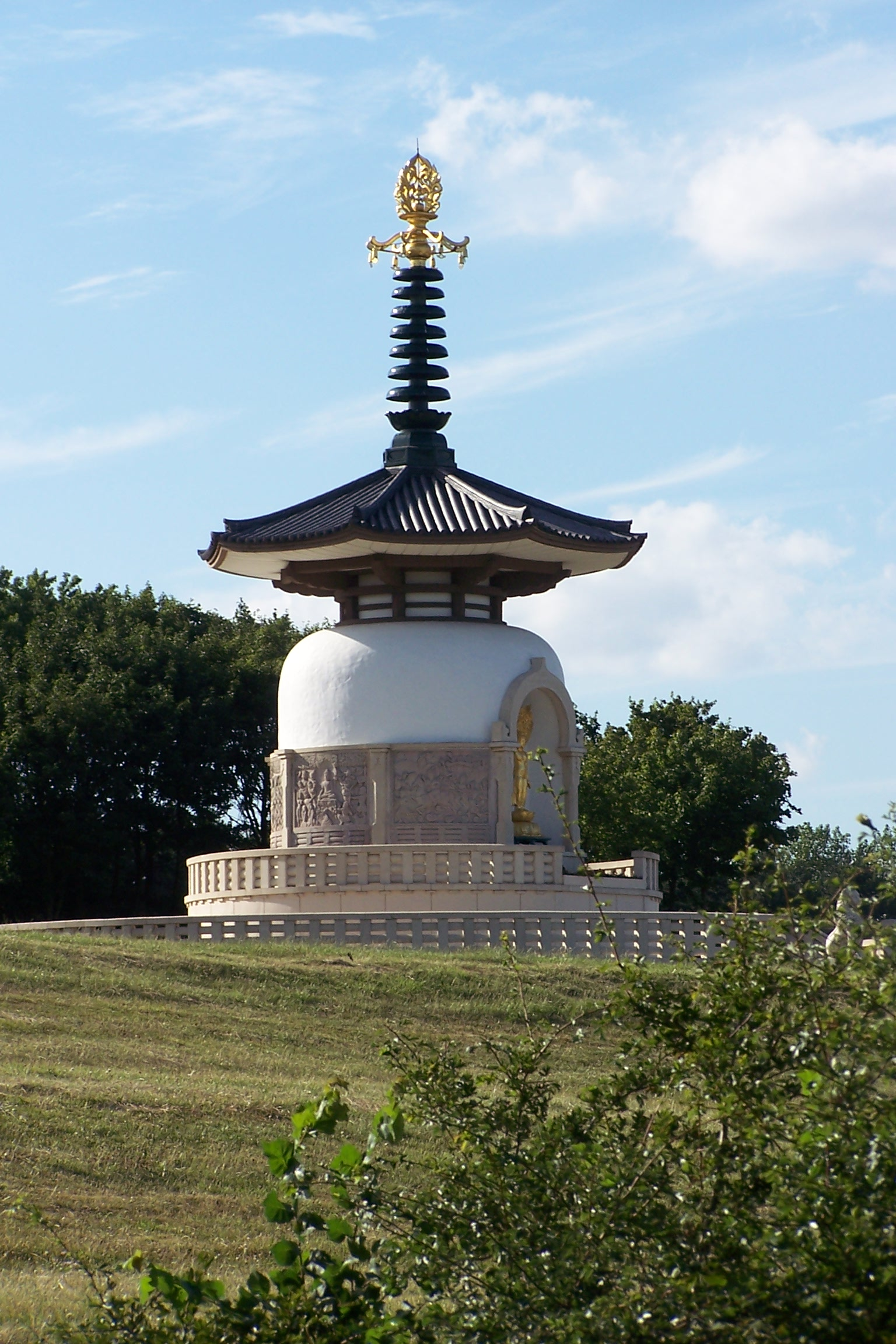
Peace Pagoda with coordinates 52.057697°N 0.725436°W, built Nipponzan Myōhōji in 1980. Milton Keynes, England, is the first Peace Pagoda in the western hemisphere.

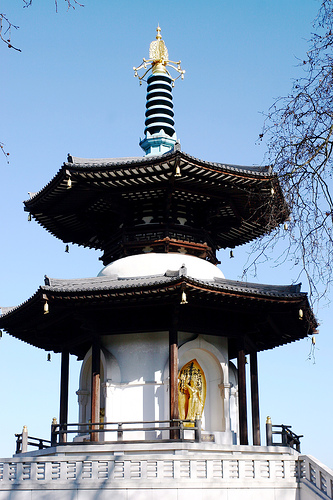
Peace Pagoda with coordinates 51.482018°N 0.159025°W (London, England) built by Nipponzan Myōhōji in 1985.

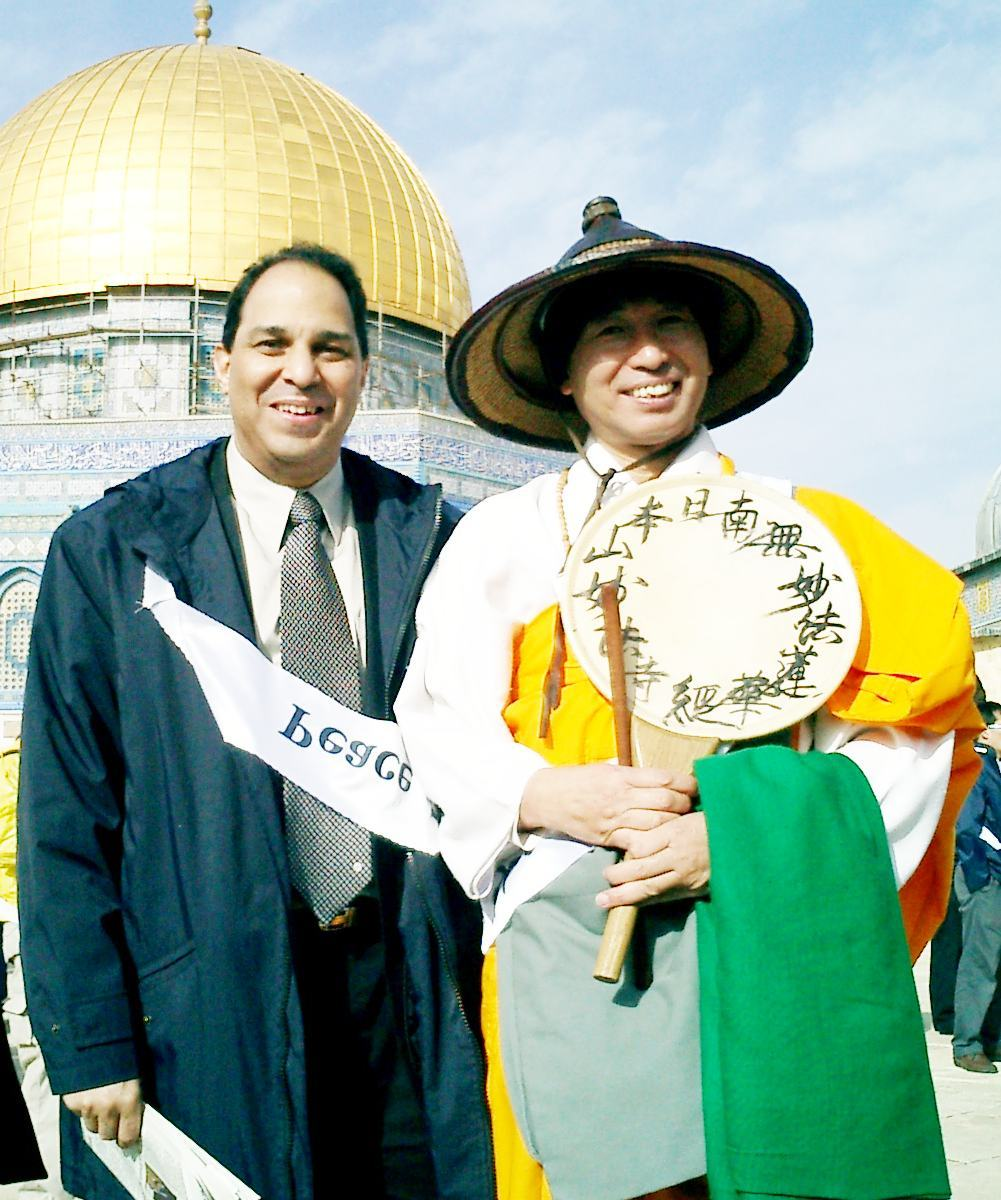
Rev. Terasawa-Sensei with Frank Kaufmann. Jerusalem, 2003.

Junsei Terasawa was born on September 15, 1950, into a poor family in Hakui, Ishikawa. He is the second son in the family.

Shortly before the Berlin Wall Fall, he conducted a seven day prayer without food and water on the grave of Karl Marx, burned his finger phalanx and made a Peace March from Warsaw to the wall.

Terasawa suggested Ukrainian religious leaders make a joint application for peace and a non-violent society in Ukraine. On the day of commemoration for those killed on the Kyiv Maidan, he initiated another peace walk in Kyiv and cities of south-eastern Ukraine.

== See also ==
- Fujii, Nichidatsu
- List of peace activists
- Nam(u) Myōhō Renge Kyō
- Nichiren
- Nipponzan Myōhōji
- Kam'yanka. All Religions Mount
- Pan'kivka. Peace Pagoda Building
- Peace Pagoda
- Peace march

== Further materials ==
- KPP, Group. "Kushan Peace Promotion".
- Shvedovski, Felix (2011). "Bodhisattva Live Mandala.mp4". YouTube.
- Spencer, Metta (Jul–Sep 2001). "That Peace Monk: Junsei Terasawa". Peace Magazine. 17 (3): 16. ISSN 0826-9521.
- Terasawa, Junsei (8 January 2006). "See this man urgent message from Junsei Terasawa, Buddhist monk from Japan, on no-end fasting of Said-Emin Ibragimov" (PDF).
- Tribinevicius, Medeine (2011). "Buddhism: Not The Ends of The Earth".
- ПЧР (January 3, 2007). "The Сase of Junsei Terasawa" (in Russian).
- Тэрасава, Дзюнсэй (1997). To Dispel Darkness in Alive Beings (in Russian). Donetsk, Ukraine: Mahasangha. p. 224.
- Тэрасава, Дзюнсэй (2001). In the New Century without Wars and Violence (in Russian). Donetsk, Ukraine: Mahasangha Nipponzan Myōhōji. p. 512.
- Тэрасава, Дзюнсэй (2006). Global Awakening (PDF) (in Russian). Donetsk, Ukraine: Mahasangha Nipponzan Myōhōji. p. 447. ISBN 966-8292-87-1.
