= Leverett, Massachusetts =

Town in Massachusetts, United States

- Town
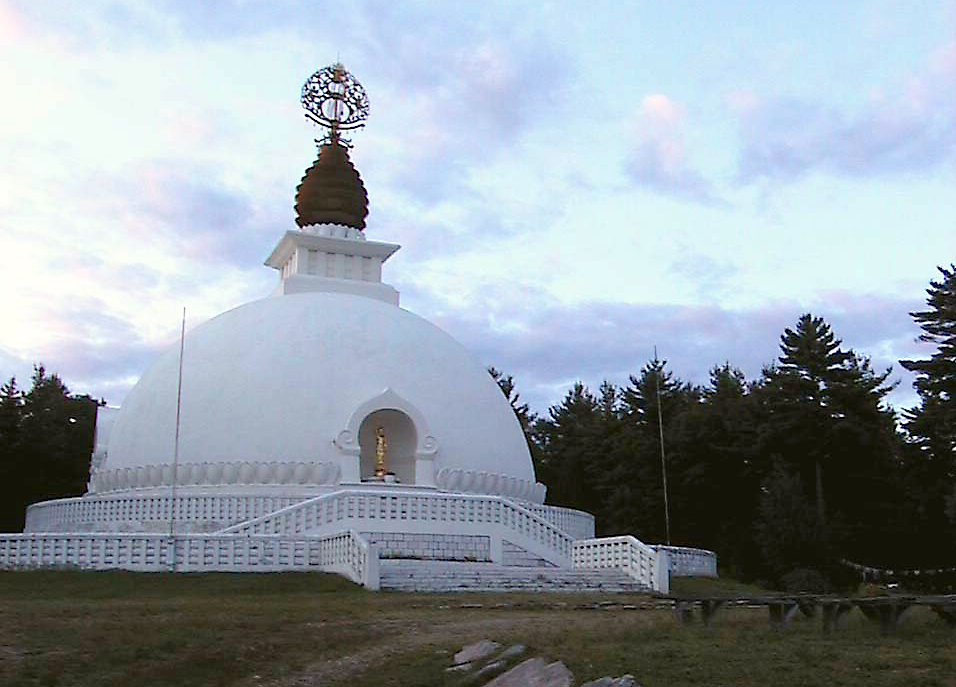
- The New England Peace Pagoda in Leverett

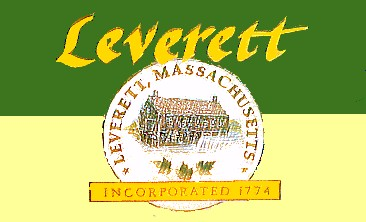
- Flag Seal

- Location in Franklin County in Massachusetts
- Coordinates: 42°27′07″N 72°30′07″W
- Country: United States
- State: Massachusetts
- County: Franklin
- Settled: 1713
- Incorporated: 1774

Government
  - Type: Open town meeting

Area
  - Total: 23.0 sq mi (59.5 km^{2})
  - Land: 22.9 sq mi (59.2 km^{2})
  - Water: 0.15 sq mi (0.4 km^{2})
- Elevation: 883 ft (269 m)

Population (2020)
  - Total: 1,865
  - Density: 81.6/sq mi (31.5/km^{2})
- Time zone: UTC−5 (Eastern)
  - Summer (DST): UTC−4 (Eastern)
- ZIP Code: 01054
- Area code: 413
- FIPS code: 25-35180
- GNIS feature ID: 0618168
- Website: www.leverett.ma.us

Leverett is a town in Franklin County, Massachusetts, United States. The population was 1,865 as of the 2020 census. It is part of the Springfield, Massachusetts Metropolitan Statistical Area.

== History ==
Leverett is one of the southernmost towns of Franklin County, located west of Shutesbury and Wendell, east of Sunderland, south of Montague, and north of Amherst. Leverett was originally part of Sunderland (named Swampfield at that time).

The first non-indigenous settlement was established in 1750, and the settlers officially petitioned Sunderland to become their own town in 1774. The town was named for John Leverett, the twentieth Governor of the Massachusetts Bay Colony.

In 1985, a Buddhist monastic order called Nipponzan Myohoji erected a large monument in Leverett. This structure, known as the New England Peace Pagoda, is considered the first of its kind in North America. Two historic Evangelical churches are also located in Leverett, North Leverett Baptist and Moore's Corner Church, the latter of which was founded by a protégé of evangelist Dwight L. Moody.

The Boston Globe ran a story in 2005 describing Leverett and its neighboring town, Shutesbury, as one of "America's Broadband Black Holes". In 2017 Massachusetts Governor Charlie Baker announced grant funding for high speed broadband in several towns, including Leverett.

== Geography ==
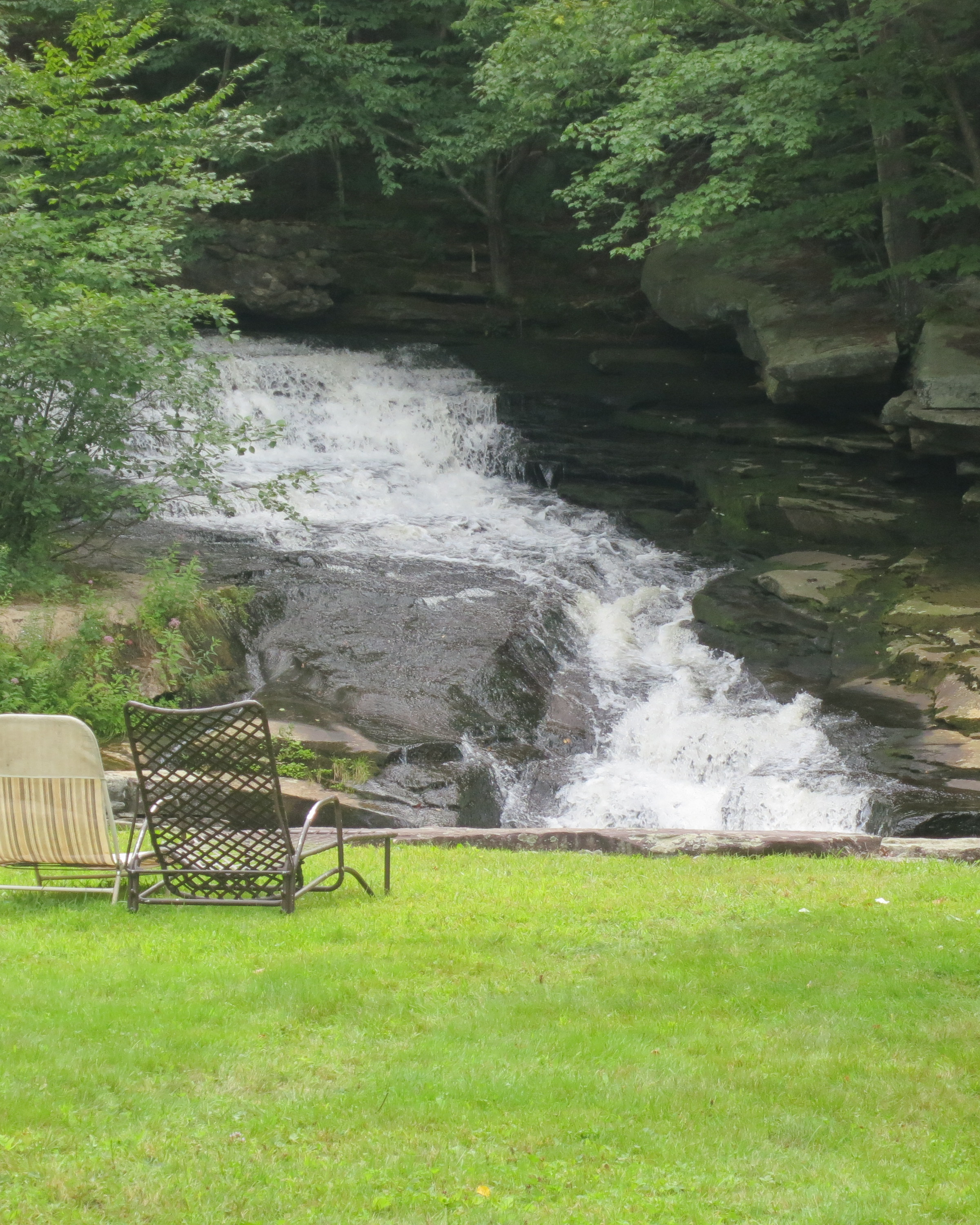
Saw Mill River Falls near Rattlesnake Gutter

According to the United States Census Bureau, the town has a total area of 23.0 square miles (60 km^{2}), of which 22.9 square miles (59 km^{2}) are land and 0.1-square-mile (0.26 km^{2}) (0.61%) is water. Leverett is located on the edge of the Pioneer Valley and the hills of northwestern Massachusetts, just east of the Connecticut River. The southwestern corner of town is relatively flat plains, while the rest is dominated by hills, the tallest of which is Brushy Mountain, with an elevation of 1,260 feet (380 m).

Several brooks drain through the town, all heading toward the Connecticut River. Leverett Pond is the town's largest body of water, lying near the center of town. A small part of Mount Toby State Forest crosses into the town from the west. The town's most famous geological feature, however, is Rattlesnake Gutter, a boulder-filled chasm near the geographic center of town.

Leverett is located along the southern border of Franklin County, north of Hampshire County. The town is bordered by Montague to the north, Wendell to the northeast, Shutesbury to the east, Amherst to the south, and Sunderland to the west. There are four small villages in the town, Leverett Center, East Leverett, North Leverett and Moores Corner. North Leverett begins at the intersection of Montague Road and Cave Hill Road, extending north to the Montague and Wendell borders. A fifth, Hillsboro, was a former village with an independent post office there until it was disestablished in 1934.

From Leverett Center, Leverett is 14 miles (23 km) south-southeast of the county seat of Greenfield, 27 miles (43 km) north of Springfield, and 86 miles (138 km) west of Boston.

== Demographics ==
Historical population
Year	Pop.	±%
1790	524	—
1850	948	+80.9%
1860	964	+1.7%
1870	877	−9.0%
1880	742	−15.4%
1890	702	−5.4%
1900	744	+6.0%
1910	728	−2.2%
1920	695	−4.5%
1930	677	−2.6%
1940	688	+1.6%
1950	791	+15.0%
1960	914	+15.5%
1970	1,005	+10.0%
1980	1,471	+46.4%
1990	1,785	+21.3%
2000	1,663	−6.8%
2010	1,851	+11.3%
2020	1,865	+0.8%
2022	1,860	−0.3%
2025	1,876	+0.9%
Source: United States census records and Population Estimates Program data.

As of the census of 2000, there were 1,663 people, in 632 households, and 448 families residing in the town. The population density was 72.8 inhabitants per square mile (28.1/km^{2}). There were 648 housing units at an average density of 28.4 per square mile (11.0/km^{2}). The racial makeup of the town was 95.31% White; 0.24% African American; 0.54% Native American; 1.38% Asian; 1.62% from other races; and 0.90% from two or more races. Hispanic or Latino of any race were 1.44% of the population.

Of the 632 households, 34.0% had children under the age of 18 living in them; 58.5% were married couples living together; 9.2% had a female householder with no husband present; and 29.0% were non-families. Of all households 19.9% were made up of individuals, and 5.2% had someone living alone who was 65 years of age or older. The average household size was 2.58 and the average family size was 2.92.

In the town, the population was spread out, with 23.3% under the age of 18, 7.8% from 18 to 24; 22.1% from 25 to 44, 35.7% from 45 to 64; and 11.2% who were 65 years of age or older. The median age was 43 years. For every 100 females, there were 99.9 males. For every 100 females age 18 and over, there were 94.4 males.

The median income for a household was $63,203, and the median income for a family was $73,333. Males had a median income of $45,078 versus $36,607 for females. The per capita income for the town was $31,891. About 1.6% of families and 5.4% of the population were below the poverty line, including 2.1% of those under age 18 and 5.0% of those age 65 or over.

== Transportation ==
There are no interstates or limited-access highways in the town; the nearest, Interstate 91, lies west of town, across the Connecticut River. The only state route to pass through town, Route 63, runs through Leverett's western side, heading from Amherst into Montague. The route runs roughly parallel to the New England Central Railroad freight line. The nearest general aviation airport is Turners Falls Airport in Montague, and the nearest national air service is at Bradley International Airport in Connecticut.

== Education ==
The town is part of the Erving School Union #28 for grades PK–6 along with the towns of Shutesbury, New Salem, Wendell, and Erving, and the Amherst Regional School District along with Amherst, Pelham, and Shutesbury. Leverett has one elementary school, which serves grades PK–6. Students in Leverett then attend Amherst Regional Middle School for grades 7–8, and high school students attend Amherst Regional High School.

== Notable people ==
- Erastus Salisbury Field, nineteenth century painter, whose works are held in Historic Deerfield, the D'Amour Museum of Fine Arts in Springield, and the National Gallery in Washington DC
- Michael Kittredge, founder of the Yankee Candle Company
