= Nipponzan-Myōhōji-Daisanga =

Japanese new religious movement group founded in 1917 by Nichidatsu Fujii

Nipponzan-Myōhōji-Daisanga (日本山妙法寺大僧伽), often referred to as just Nipponzan Myohoji or the Japan Buddha Sangha, is a Japanese new religious movement and activist group founded in 1917 by Nichidatsu Fujii, emerging from Nichiren Buddhism. "Nipponzan Myōhōji is a small Nichiren Buddhist Order of about 1500 persons, including both monastics and lay persons." The community reveres the Lotus Sutra as the highest expression of the Buddhist message.

In addition, it is actively engaged worldwide in the peace movement. It is the most pacifist group in Japan of seven religious movements surveyed by Robert Kisala. The main practice of Nichiren Buddhism is to chant Namu Myōhō Renge Kyō. Nipponzan-Myōhōji monks, nuns and followers beat hand drums while chanting the Daimoku, and walk throughout the world promoting peace and non-violence. They try to explain the meaning of their ministry to all wishing to understand it.

== History ==
In 1917, Nipponzan-Myōhōji was founded in Liaoyang.

In 1932, Nipponzan-Myōhōji monks were attacked by a mob in Shanghai while beating drums and chanting Namu Myōhō Renge Kyō on the street. Two monks were hospitalized and one died. This was exploited by the Japanese Army to spark the January 28 incident, in which over 14,000 Chinese died. While some writers claim that Nipponzan-Myōhōji arranged the assault with the Japanese military, this was vehemently denied by Nichidatsu Fujii, who stated that his Order was a victim of the affair.

In 1933, Nichidatsu Fujii visited Mahatma Gandhi in India. In a letter to Gandhi, Fujii wrote that the Japanese cause was just and that Japan had a unique historical commitment to peace due to its Buddhist culture.

In 1937, Nipponzan-Myōhōji army chaplains praying for peace were the first to enter the city of Nanjing during the Nanjing Massacre.

== Peace Pagodas and Pilgrimages ==
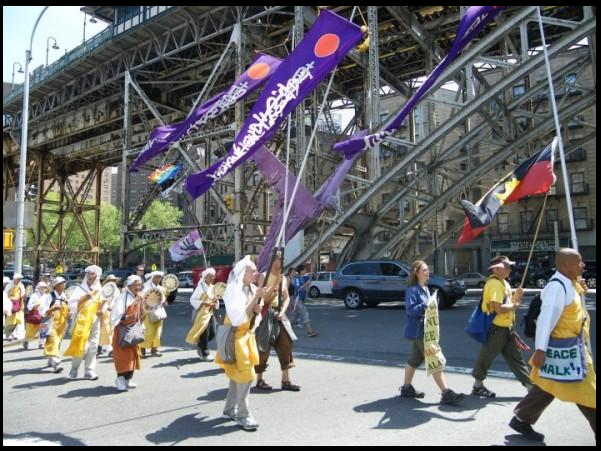
Nipponzan Myohoji Peace Walk

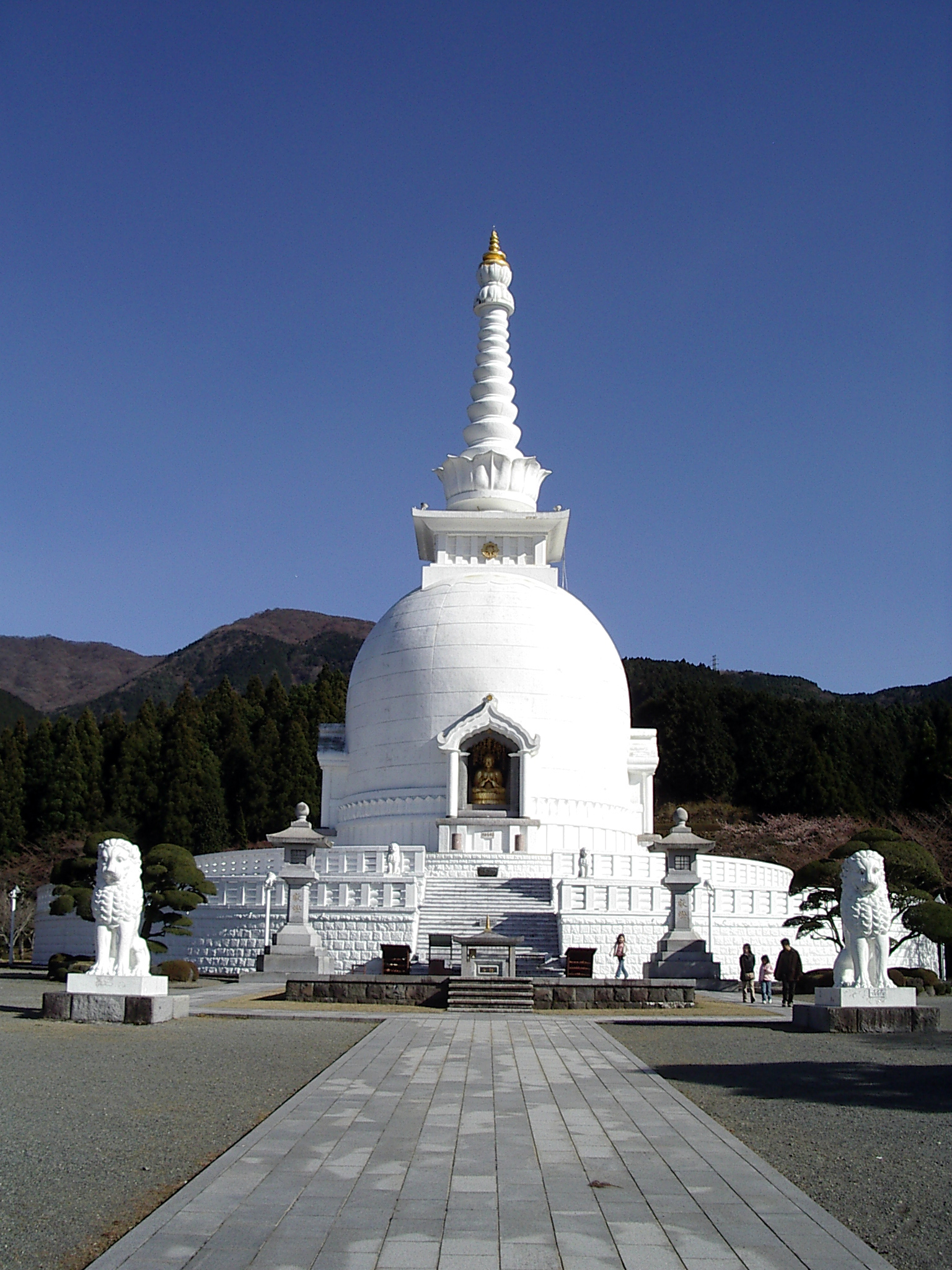
Stupa in Gotemba, Shizuoka, Japan

The most recognizable achievement of Nipponzan-Myōhōji is peace pagodas (stupas), that have been erected in various locations around the world. The first peace pagoda was inaugurated in 1954 at Kumamoto, Japan. The peace pagoda on Mt. Kiyosumi was inaugurated in 1969, the one in Nagasaki, in 1970, and the one in Tokyo, in 1974. In 1976, the Yoshino-yama Peace Pagoda in Japan was inaugurated on Mt. Yoshino, in Nara Prefecture. In the words of the founder, The Most Venerable Nichidatsu Fujii: “… as a principal image for [world peace], this peace pagoda was erected ... with the relics of Lord Buddha... .’’ Since then, cities such as London, New Delhi, Vienna, and Comiso (in Italy) have all received peace pagodas.

In 1980, the first peace pagoda in the Western hemisphere was built at Willen, Milton Keynes, UK.

In 1985, the first peace pagoda in the United States was completed, the New England Peace Pagoda in Leverett, Massachusetts. The second US pagoda was built in 1993. There are currently three peace pagodas in the United States, and as of April 2022 there are plans for a fourth.

Followers of the Order have also undertaken numerous peace pilgrimages. One of the most prominent of these was the 1994–1995 Interfaith Pilgrimage for Peace and Life from Auschwitz to Hiroshima, by way of Bosnia, Iraq, Cambodia, and other countries experiencing the effects of war. In 2010, they participated in the Walk for a Nuclear-Free Future across the United States.

Many argue that the Order shows a certain political stance with its active opposition to the nuclear industry in Japan, and U.S. involvement in Okinawa. They refer to a speech given by the founder of the Order in which he states that Buddhism has to be actively involved with the affairs of the world. This has led to a difference in views with fellow Nichiren sect Soka Gakkai, whom the founder of Nippozan Myohoji considered to be more conservative.

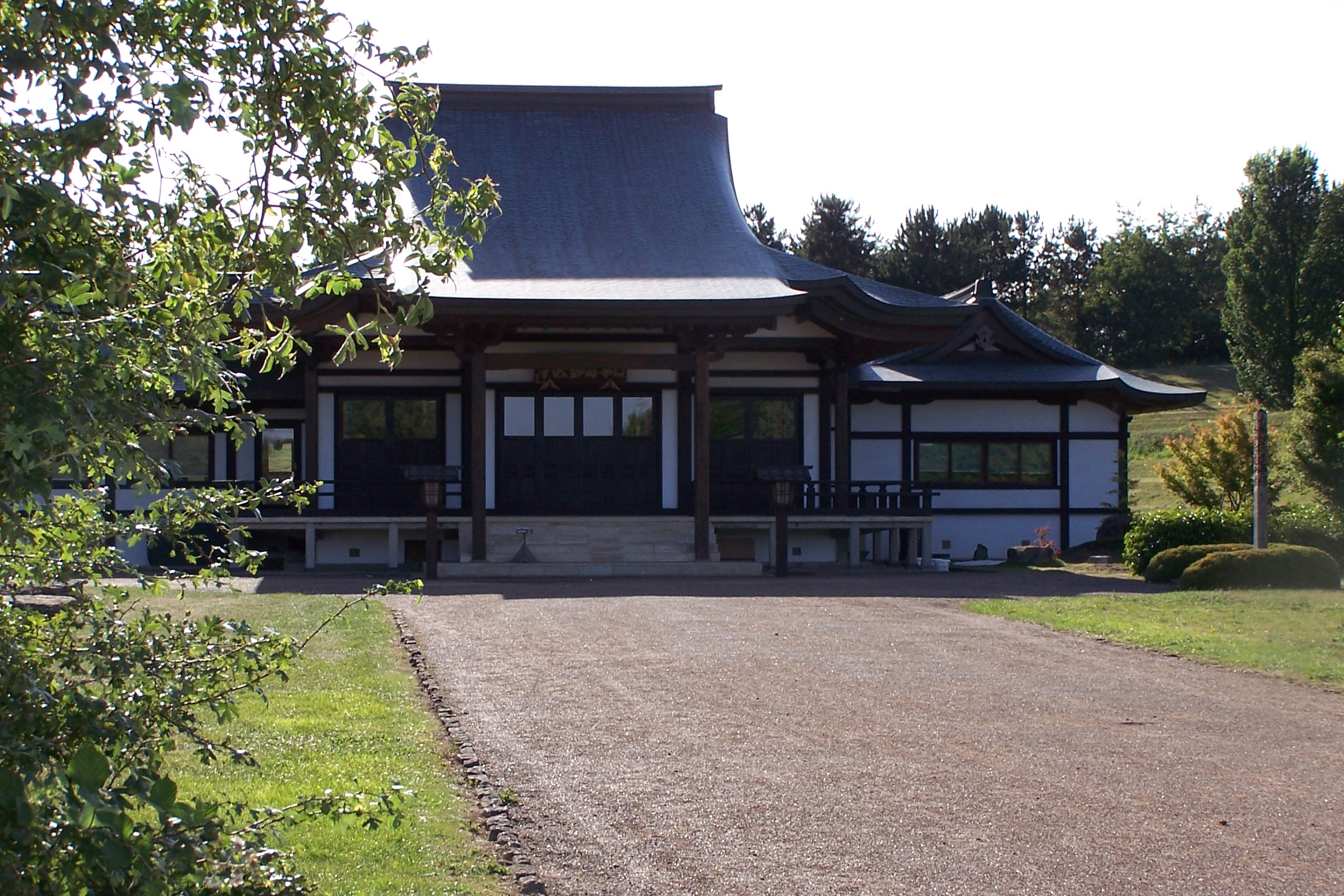
The Nipponzan-Myōhōji temple in Milton Keynes, England

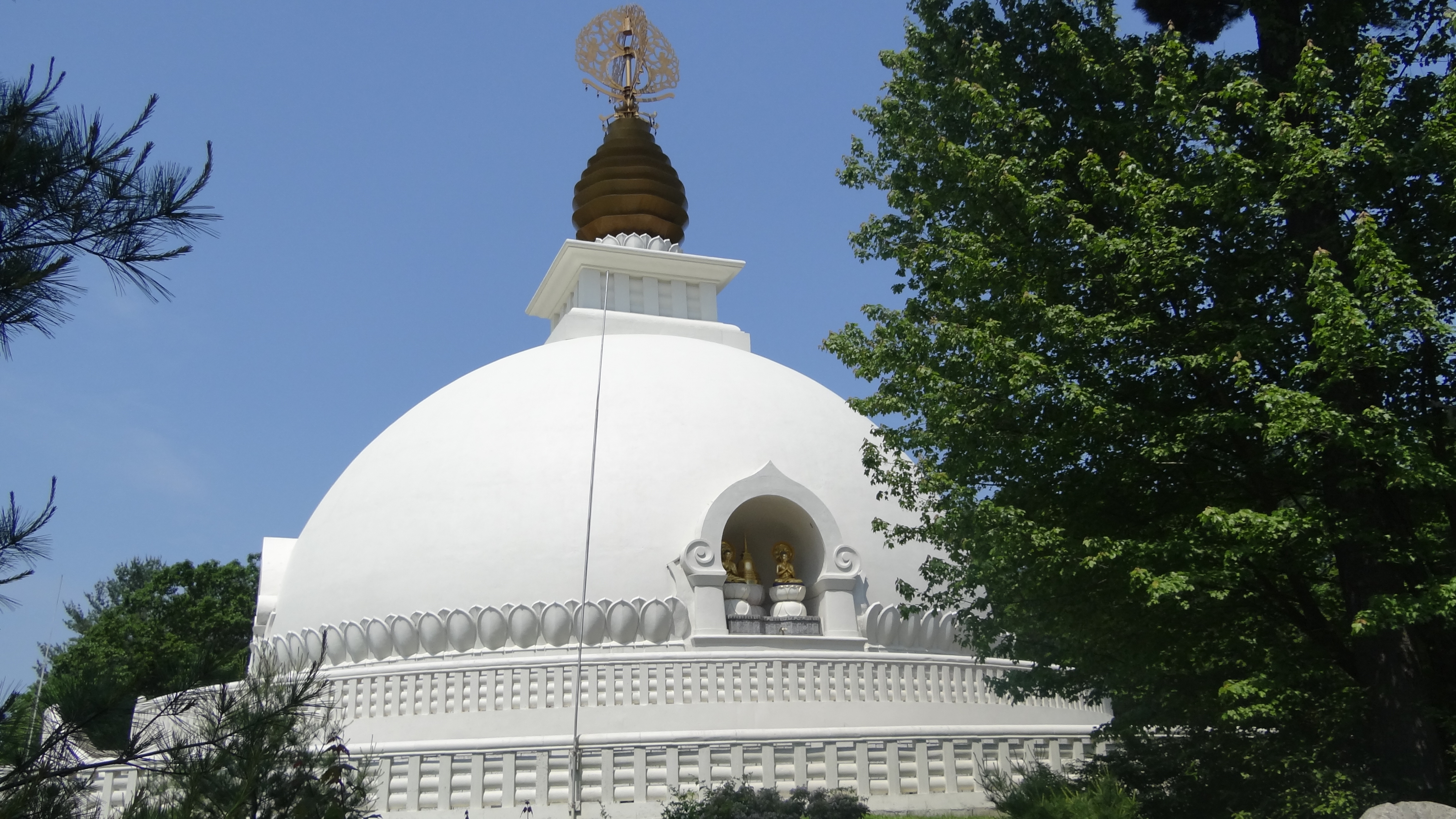
The New England Peace Pagoda

== See also ==
- Junsei Terasawa
- Pan'kivka Peace Pagoda Building
