= Leverett Center Historic District =

Historic district in Massachusetts, United States

- U.S. National Register of Historic Places
- U.S. Historic district
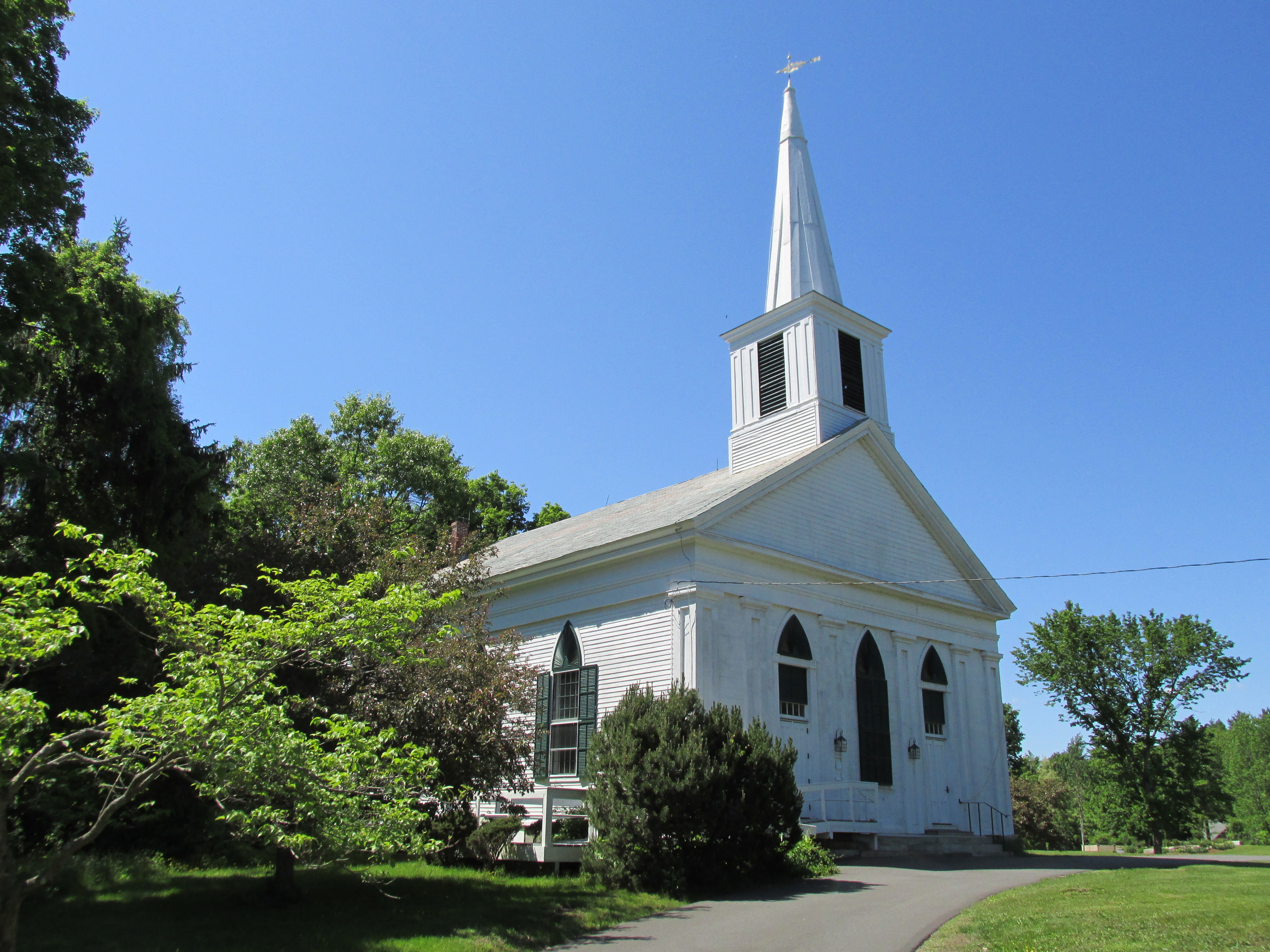
- Leverett Congregational Church

- Location within Massachusetts Location within the United States
- Location: Amherst, Montague, Depot, and Shutesbury Roads; Leverett, Massachusetts
- Coordinates: 42°27′50″N 72°30′22″W
- Area: 467 acres (189 ha)
- Built: 1750
- Architect: Josiah Pomeroy Jr.; Bernhard Dirks
- Architectural style: Georgian, Early Republic, Greek Revival
- NRHP reference No.: 08001127
- Added to NRHP: December 5, 2008

The Leverett Center Historic District is an expansive 467-acre (189 ha) historic district encompassing the historic heart of the rural community of Leverett in eastern Franklin County, Massachusetts. The district is focused on a two-mile stretch of Depot and Montague Roads, at whose center is the civic heart of the town. It includes the 1838 Greek Revival First Congregational Church, the town hall, whose present form was achieved in 1895 by raising the 1845 construction and building a first floor underneath it, and the Colonial Revival Field Memorial Library (1916). It also includes a town pound (a stone-walled pen for stray livestock) built c. 1822, and a number of 18th century residences. The district was listed on the National Register of Historic Places in 2008.

Leverett was first settled in the late 17th century as part of Sunderland, and was separately incorporated in 1774. Its town center, located at the junction of Depot, Montague, and Shutesbury Roads, arose by the placement there of the community's first meeting house not long after incorporation. The oldest surviving residences in the center date to about 1750. Its single largest period of growth lasted until about 1830, which included construction of the town's first school c. 1800 (94 Depot Road), and the town pound. Modest growth continued in the mid-19th century, when a railroad line was run nearby. This provided the impetus for some small-scale industrial activity, evidence of which survives in a single modest wood-frame factory building.

== See also ==
- National Register of Historic Places listings in Franklin County, Massachusetts
