= Lutuhyne Raion =

Former subdivision of Luhansk Oblast, Ukraine

Lutuhyne Raion Лутугинський район
- Raion
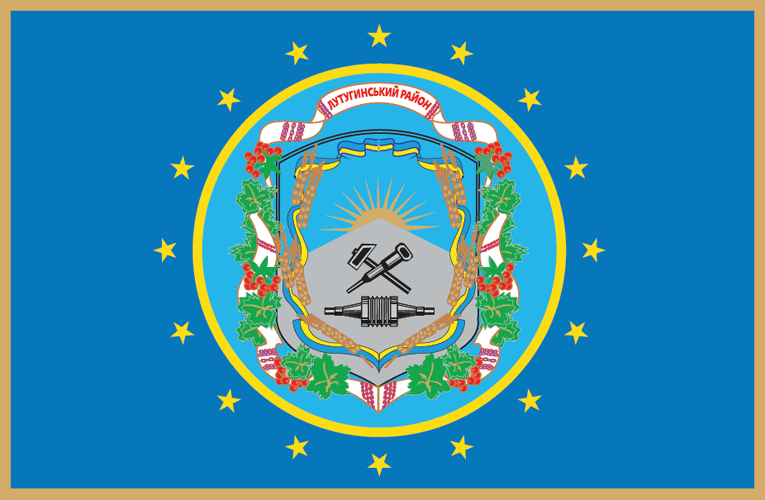
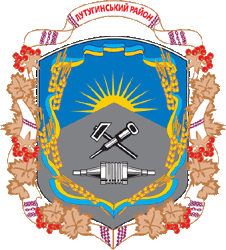
- Flag Coat of arms

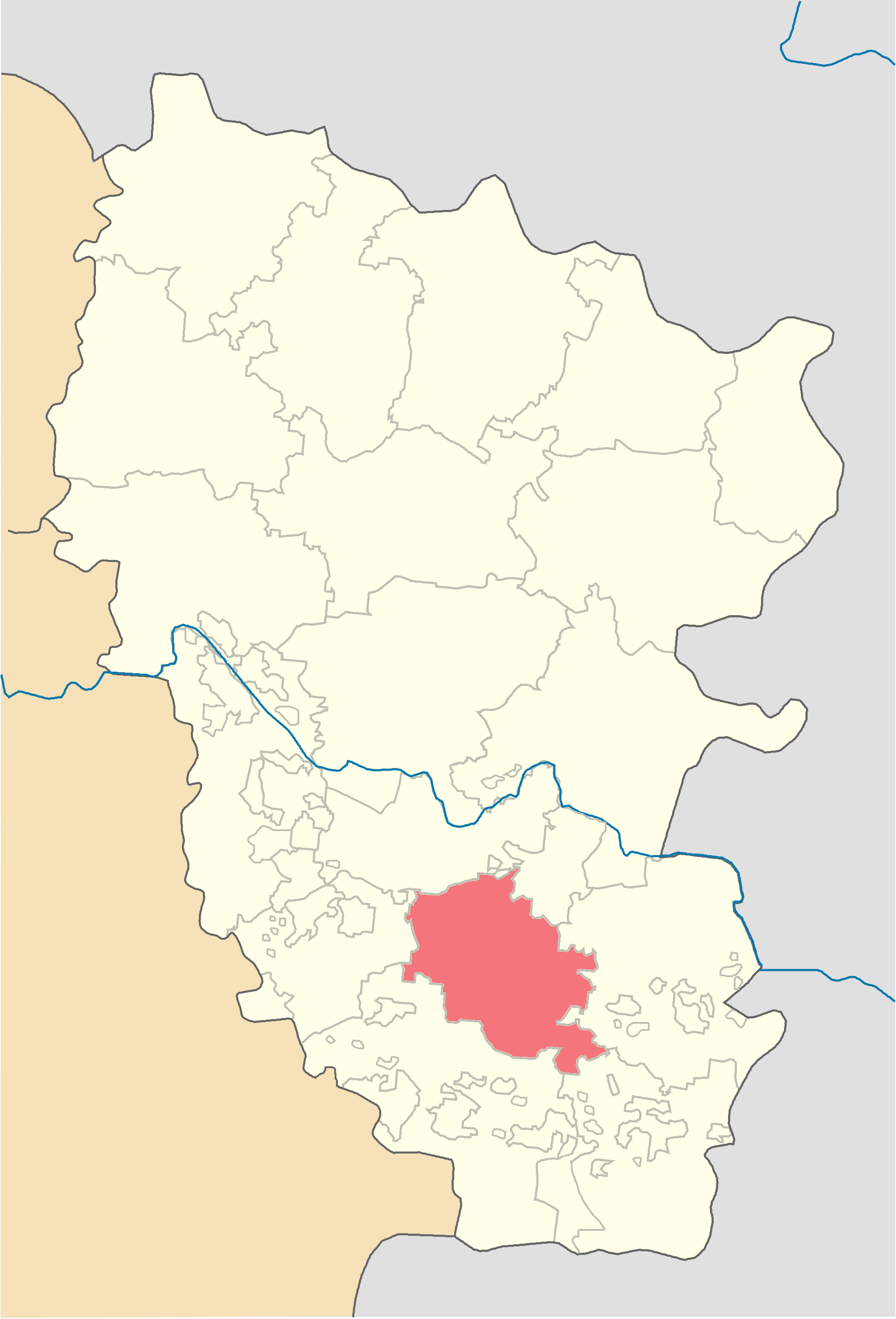
- Coordinates: 48°23′1″N 39°12′43″E
- Country: Ukraine
- Region: Luhansk Oblast
- Established: 1965
- Disestablished: 18 July 2020
- Admin. center: Lutuhyne
- Subdivisions: List: 1 — city councils; 7 — settlement councils; 8 — rural councils; Number of localities: 1 — cities; 7 — urban-type settlements; 26 — villages; 11 — rural settlements

Government
  - Governor: Viktor Bordeev

Area
  - Total: 1,057 km^{2} (408 sq mi)

Population (2020)
  - Total: 65,071 ▼
  - Density: 61.56/km^{2} (159.4/sq mi)
- Time zone: UTC+02:00 (EET)
  - Summer (DST): UTC+03:00 (EEST)
- Postal index: 92000—92044
- Area code: +380 6436
- Website: http://lu.loga.gov.ua/

Lutuginsky Municipal District Лутугинский муниципальный округ (Russian)
- District

Other transcription(s)
  - Ukrainian: Свердловський район
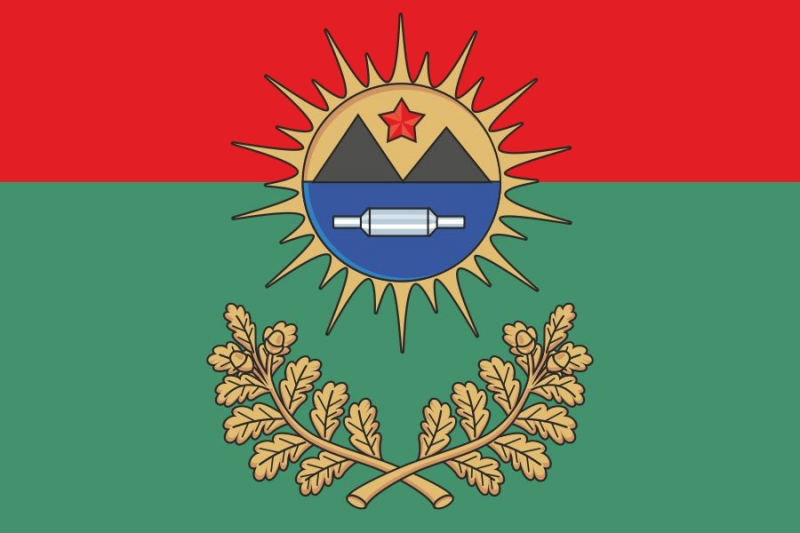
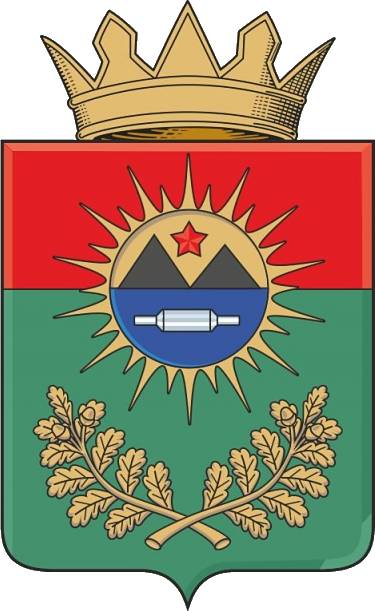
- Flag Coat of arms

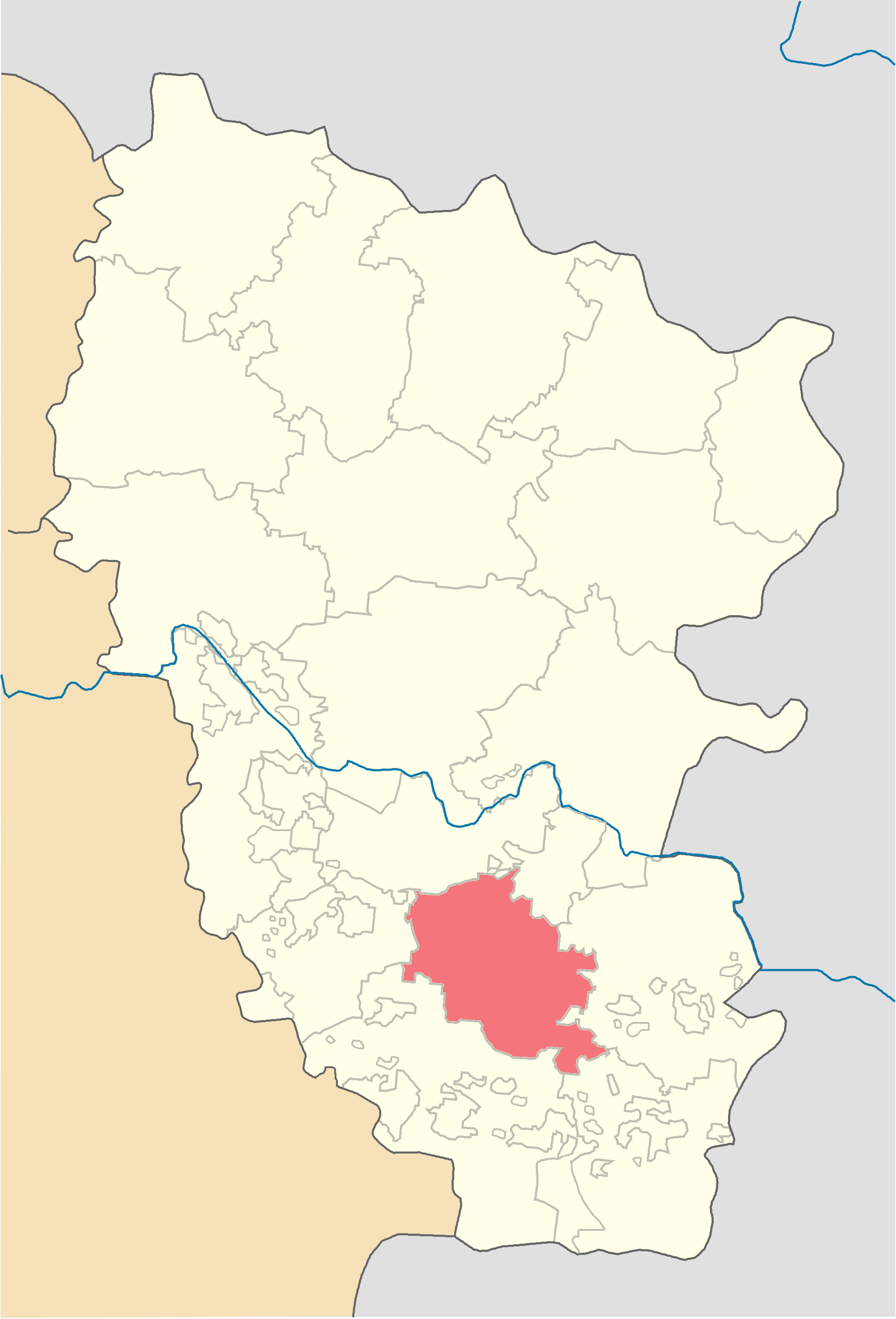
- Location of Lutuginsky District in the Luhansk People's Republic
- Coordinates: 48°23′1″N 39°12′43″E
- Country: Russia
- Federal subject: Luhansk People's Republic
- Established: 1965
- Administrative center: Lutugine

Area
  - Total: 1,057 km^{2} (408 sq mi)
- Website: https://lutugino.su

Lutuhyne Raion (Ukrainian: Лутугинський район) was a raion (district) in Luhansk Oblast of Eastern Ukraine. The raion was abolished on 18 July 2020 as part of the administrative reform of Ukraine, which reduced the number of raions of Luhansk Oblast to eight. However, since 2014 the raion was not under control of Ukrainian government and has been controlled by the Luhansk People's Republic which continues using it as an administrative unit. The administrative center of the raion was the city of Lutuhyne. The last estimate of the raion population, reported by the Ukrainian government, was 67,563 (2013 est.).

== Demographics ==
As of the 2001 Ukrainian census:

Ethnicity

- Ukrainians: 71%
- Russians: 26.7%
- Belarusians: 0.7%

== Localities ==
- Illiriia
