= Luhansk Raion =

Subdivision of Luhansk Oblast, Ukraine

Coordinates: 48°24′N 39°21′E

Luhansk Raion Луганський район
- Raion
- Interactive map of Luhansk Raion
- Country: Ukraine
- Oblast: Luhansk
- Established: 2020
- Admin. center: Luhansk
- Subdivisions: 3 hromadas

Area
  - Total: 2,147 km^{2} (829 sq mi)

Population (2023)
  - Total: 527,367
  - Density: 245.6/km^{2} (636.2/sq mi)

Luhansk Raion (Ukrainian: Луганський район; Russian: Луганский район) is a prospective raion (district) of Luhansk Oblast, Ukraine. It was formally created in July 2020 as part of a reformation of Ukraine's administrative divisions. The center of the raion is in the city of Luhansk. Population: 527,367 (2022 estimate). However the territory of the raion has been controlled since its creation by the pro-Russian Luhansk People's Republic, who continue to use the old, pre-2020 administrative divisions of Ukraine which only makes the Raion de-jure.

== Subdivisions ==
The raion contains three hromadas:

- Luhansk urban hromada;
- Lutuhyne urban hromada;
- Molodohvardiisk urban hromada.
