= William Rolfe =

William Rolfe may refer to:

- William James Rolfe (1827–1910), American educator
- William Rolfe (MP) for Heytesbury (UK Parliament constituency)
