= Lake Wyola =

Lake in Shutesbury, Massachusetts, US

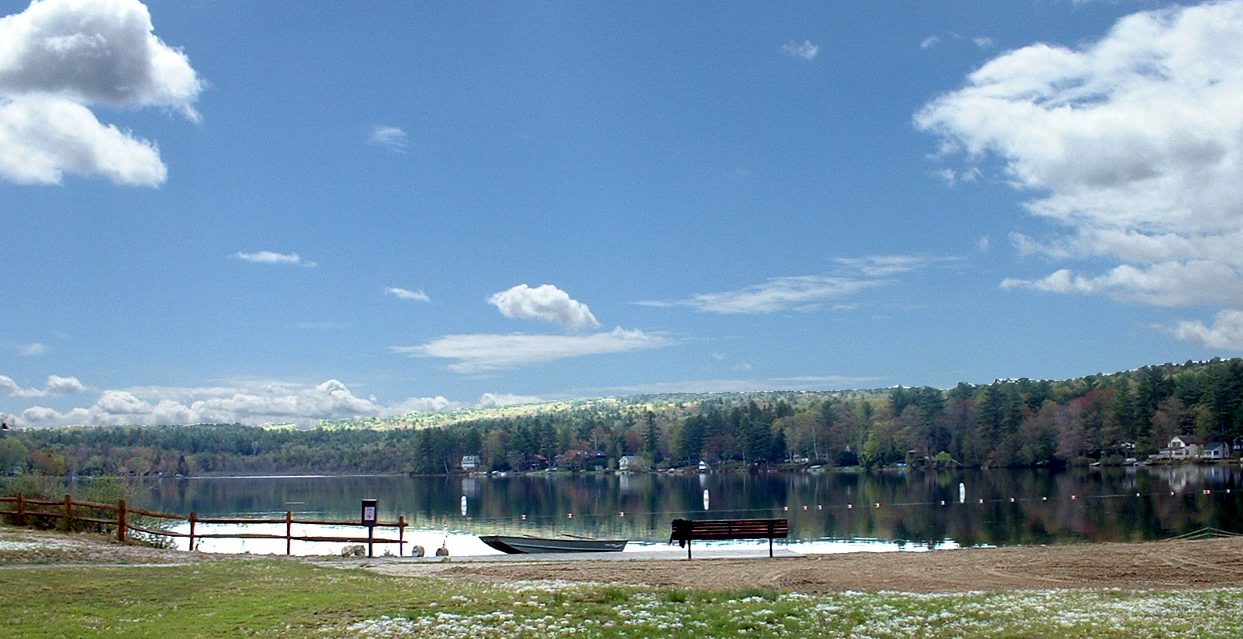

- Location within Massachusetts Location within the United States
- Location: Shutesbury, Massachusetts
- Coordinates: 42°30′06″N 72°26′12″W
- Type: Lake then reservoir
- Primary inflows: Fiske Brook
- Primary outflows: Sawmill River
- Catchment area: 6.4 sq mi (16.6 km^{2})
- Basin countries: United States
- Surface area: 128 acres (0.5 km^{2})
- Average depth: 11 ft (3.4 m)
- Max. depth: 33 ft (10.1 m)
- Water volume: 830 acre⋅ft (1,020,000 m^{3})
- Surface elevation: 833 ft (254 m)

Lake Wyola is a lake located in Shutesbury, Massachusetts, United States.

== Dam ==
Construction was completed on a dam in 1883 that increased the size of the lake from 65 acres (0.3 km^{2}) to 130 acres (0.5 km^{2}), doubling the size of the lake. The dam was originally installed to help provide hydropower on the Sawmill River, then the site of numerous mills. Lake Wyola Dam is of earthen construction. The dam is a 232-foot-long (70.7 m), 14-foot-high (4.3 m) masonry embankment dam with a concrete spillway. Its capacity is 833 acre-feet (1,027,000 m^{3}). Normal storage is 830 acre-feet (1,020,000 m^{3}). It drains an area of 6.4 square miles (16.6 km^{2}).

In 1998 the dam was classified as a high-hazard dam by state officials. They said that there was a potential for a large loss of property and life downstream, in the towns of Leverett and Montague, if the dam should fail. In 2005 during heavy storms, there was great concern for its stability as the area directly below the dam flooded severely.

In July 2008, despite the evident and urgent need for repair or replacement the Massachusetts governor denied funding for the dam's repair. Many local residents, particularly in Leverett and Montague, were frustrated with the governor's decision. However, with so many dams in Massachusetts in need of repair, others question if the state should be spending millions to rehabilitate old dams.

Despite the gubernatorial veto, funding was eventually obtained and construction began at the dam in the fall of 2008. The repairs were completed in May 2009.

== See also ==
- Lake Wyola State Park
