= John Carew Rolfe =

American classical scholar

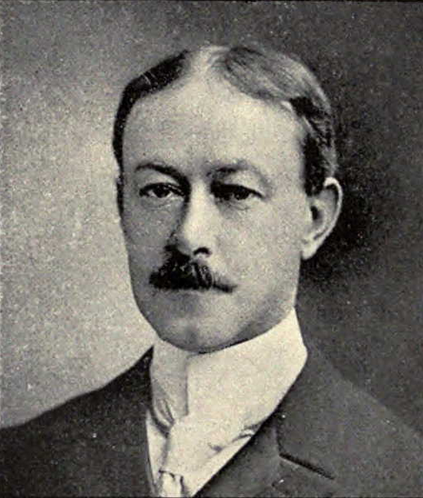
- Picture of Rolfe from the 1902 Michiganensian
- Born: October 15, 1859; Newburyport, Massachusetts, U.S.
- Died: March 26, 1943 (aged 83); Alexandria, Virginia, U.S.
- Education: Harvard University, BA (1881), Cornell University, PhD (1885)
- Spouse: Alice Griswold Bailey
- Scientific career
- Fields: Latin
- Workplaces: Harvard University, University of Michigan, University of Pennsylvania

John Carew Rolfe, Ph.D. (October 15, 1859 in Newburyport, Massachusetts – March 26, 1943) was an American classical scholar, the son of William J. Rolfe.

Rolfe graduated from Harvard University in 1881 and from Cornell University (Ph.D.) in 1885.

Rolfe taught at Cornell (1882–1885), at Harvard (1889–1890), at the University of Michigan, and at the University of Pennsylvania.

Rolfe was a professor from 1907 to 1908 at the American School of Classical Studies and at the American Academy in Rome from 1923 to 1924. He continued to serve at the Academy until 1940. He was an elected member of the American Philosophical Society. In 1910–1911, he was president of the American Philological Association.

Rolfe translated many Latin authors, especially historians, for the Loeb Classical Library: Ammianus Marcellinus, Cornelius Nepos, Aulus Gellius, Quintus Curtius, Sallust, and Suetonius.

== See also ==
- Telegenius
