= Wendell Town Common Historic District =

Historic district in Massachusetts, United States

- U.S. National Register of Historic Places
- U.S. Historic district
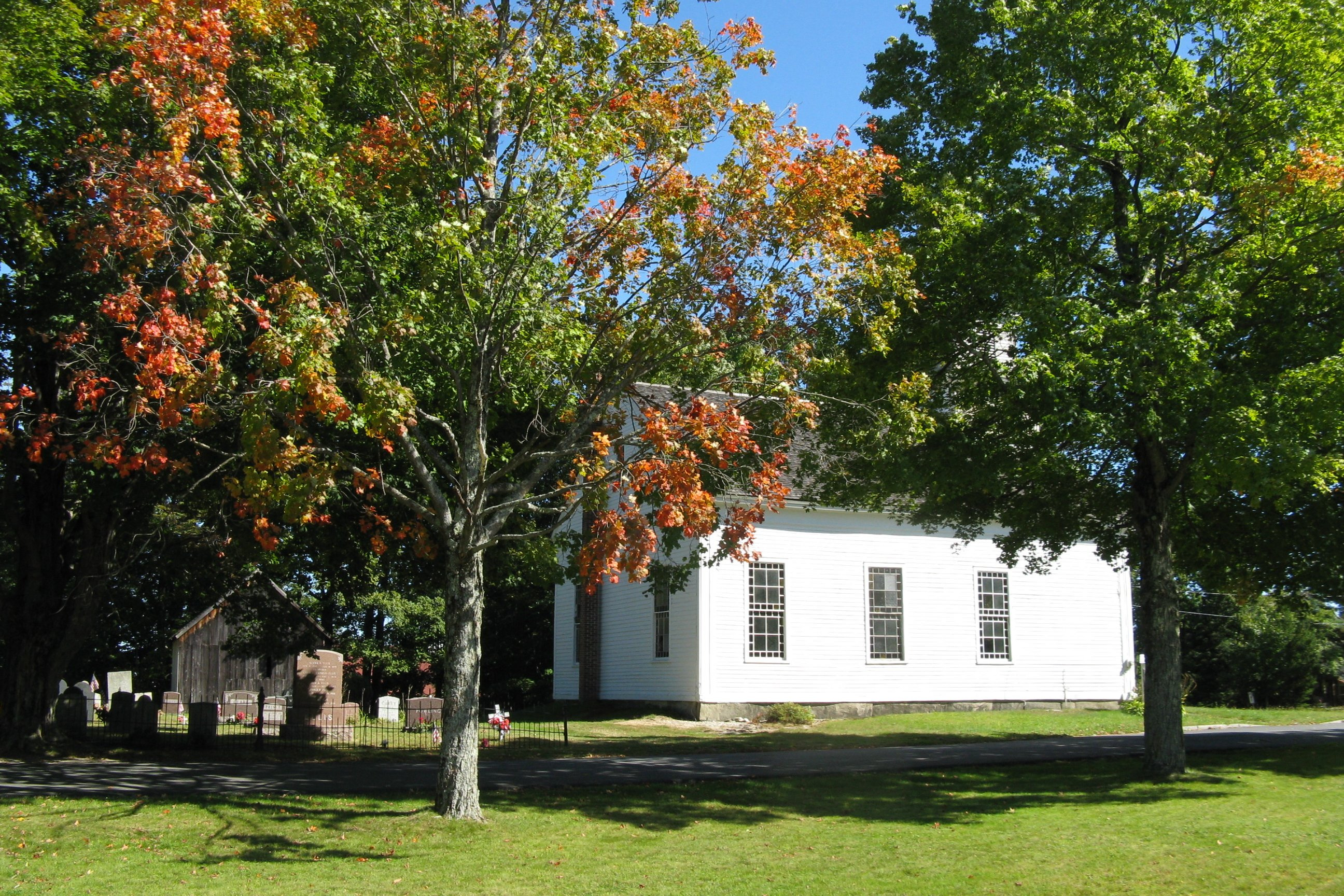
- The town meetinghouse

- Location within Massachusetts Location within the United States
- Location: Junction of Depot, Lock's Village, Montague and Morse Village Rds., Wendell, Massachusetts
- Coordinates: 42°32′55″N 72°23′51″W
- Area: 26 acres (11 ha)
- Architect: Leach, Luke O.
- Architectural style: Colonial Revival, Greek Revival, Federal
- NRHP reference No.: 92000580
- Added to NRHP: May 21, 1992

The Wendell Town Common Historic District encompasses the historic heart of the small town of Wendell, Massachusetts. Centered on a town common established in 1782, it includes a significant number of well preserved Greek Revival buildings. The district was listed on the National Register of Historic Places in 1992.

== Description and history ==
The hill town of Wendell, located in eastern Franklin County, was settled in 1754 and incorporated in 1781. Its town center, roughly located at its geographic center, dates to the period of incorporation, when a meetinghouse (no longer standing) was built, and the town common and cemetery were laid out. The oldest surviving building, the Congregational parsonage, was built in 1823. The immediate area surrounding the center has remained rural into the 20th century, with the town's only industry at Wendell Depot and Farley to the north along the railroad. The town's population gradually decreased over much of the 19th century, leaving a town center with a significant number of Greek Revival buildings from the 1840s.

The historic district is centered on the Town Common, which is a rectangular plot of land, about 1 acre (0.40 ha), bounded on the west by Locke's Village Road and Depot Road, and is roughly bisected by Morse Village Road. It is bounded on its north, east, and south by Center Road. The sides of the roads opposite the Common are lined with institutional buildings and houses that are predominantly in the Greek Revival style and date to the first half of the 19th century. The only contributing 20th-century building is the Colonial Revival library (now the Senior Center), built in 1921. The town hall, located in the district, is a Greek Revival building that was once a Baptist church built in 1819, and moved from its original location at the bottom of Morse Village Road to its present one in 1845. There is one other church building, the Congregationalist Meetinghouse, built in 1846. One of ten original schoolhouses remains standing; it is a typical 19th-century district schoolhouse, also built in 1846, and now privately owned.

== See also ==
- National Register of Historic Places listings in Franklin County, Massachusetts
