= William Augustus Mowry =

American educator, historian (1829–1917)

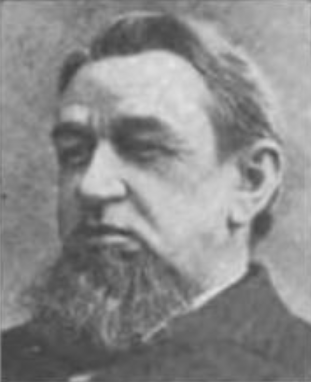
- Born: August 13, 1829; Uxbridge, Massachusetts, United States
- Died: January 24, 1917 (aged 87); Providence, Rhode Island, United States
- Education: Brown University
- Occupation(s): Historian and author in 19th century, Brown University, educator, Superintendent of Schools in Salem, Massachusetts

William Augustus Mowry (August 13, 1829 – January 24, 1917) was an American educator, historian and author, born at Uxbridge, Massachusetts.

== Family ==
William Augustus was an eighth-generation descendant of the Mowry family that immigrated from England to Providence in 1666. He was born to Johnathan Mowry and Hannah (Brayton) Mowry. His mother was from Rehoboth, Massachusetts. His father was from Uxbridge. It appears that William Augustus had two sisters and that he was the youngest in the family. His father was a farmer, a "fanner" and a boot and shoemaker. One of his sisters died in childhood. His father died at the age of 32 after a severe flu-like illness. His sister, Emmeline Maxwell Mowry, became a teacher at the age of 15. She was a scholar of botany, natural sciences, mathematics, and English literature. His great-grandfather, Richard Mowry, was a nodal point in his boyhood at Uxbridge; William Augustus wrote a book about the older man's life, his ancestors and his descendants.

The family history of the Mowry family authored by William Augustus mentions Roger Williams, John Brown, and other prominent Rhode Islanders of Colonial times related in some way to the early Mowry settlement in the Rhode Island Colony. The family was prominent in Northern Rhode Island and southeastern Massachusetts from the 17th century onward. By the 19th century, the Mowry family had migrated across the continent, as far as California, the text says.

== Education ==
From 1854 to 1857, he studied at Brown University, from which he received an honorary Master of Arts in 1866.

== Career ==
He also served as Superintendent of Schools in Salem, Massachusetts. For many years, he was engaged in educational work in Rhode Island and Massachusetts. He served as president of Martha's Vineyard Summer Institute from 1887 till its closure in 1906. In 1884 and 1885, he was editor of the Journal of Education and from 1886 to 1891 of Education.

== Publications ==
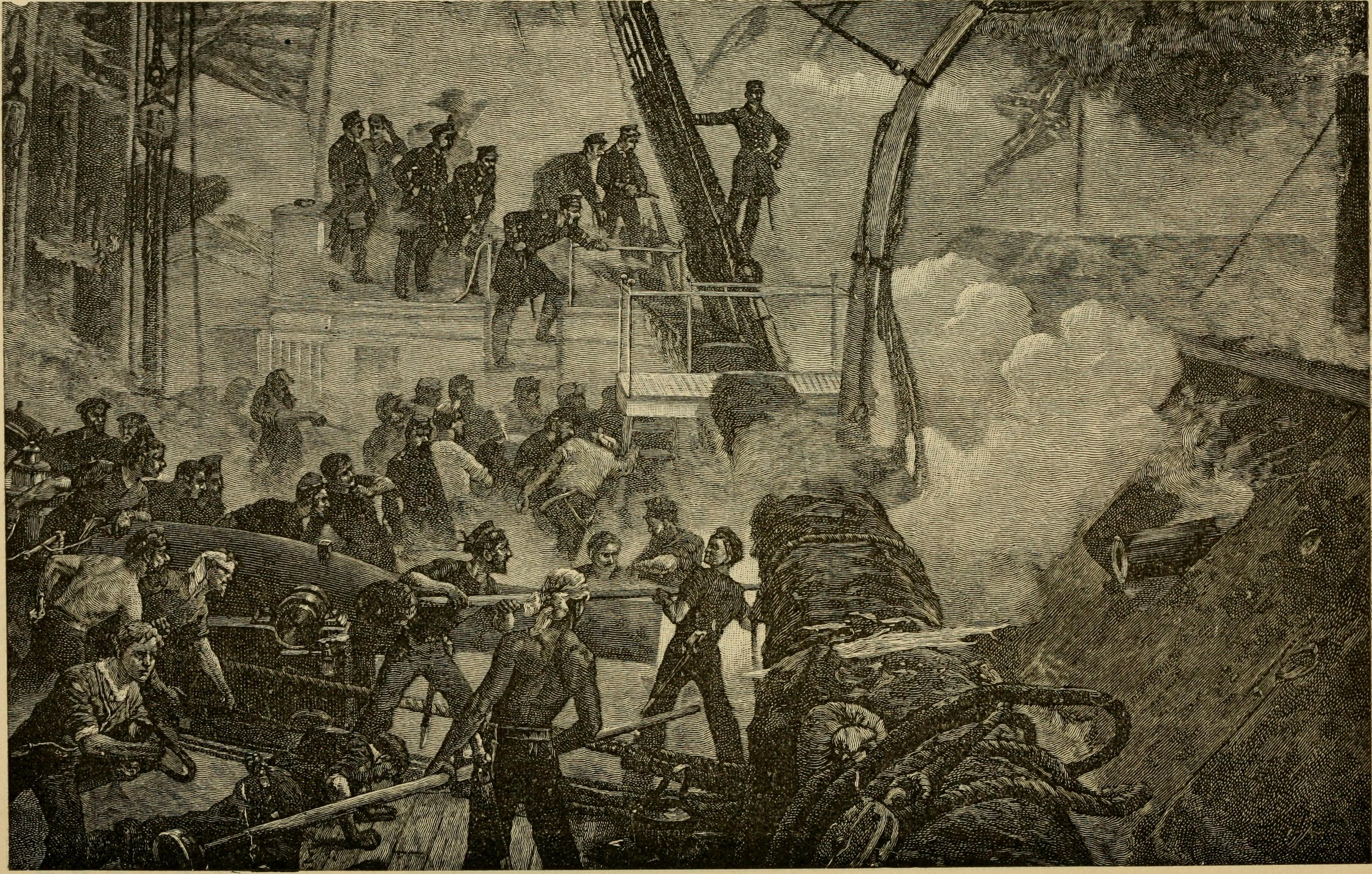
A History of the United States for Schools (1901)

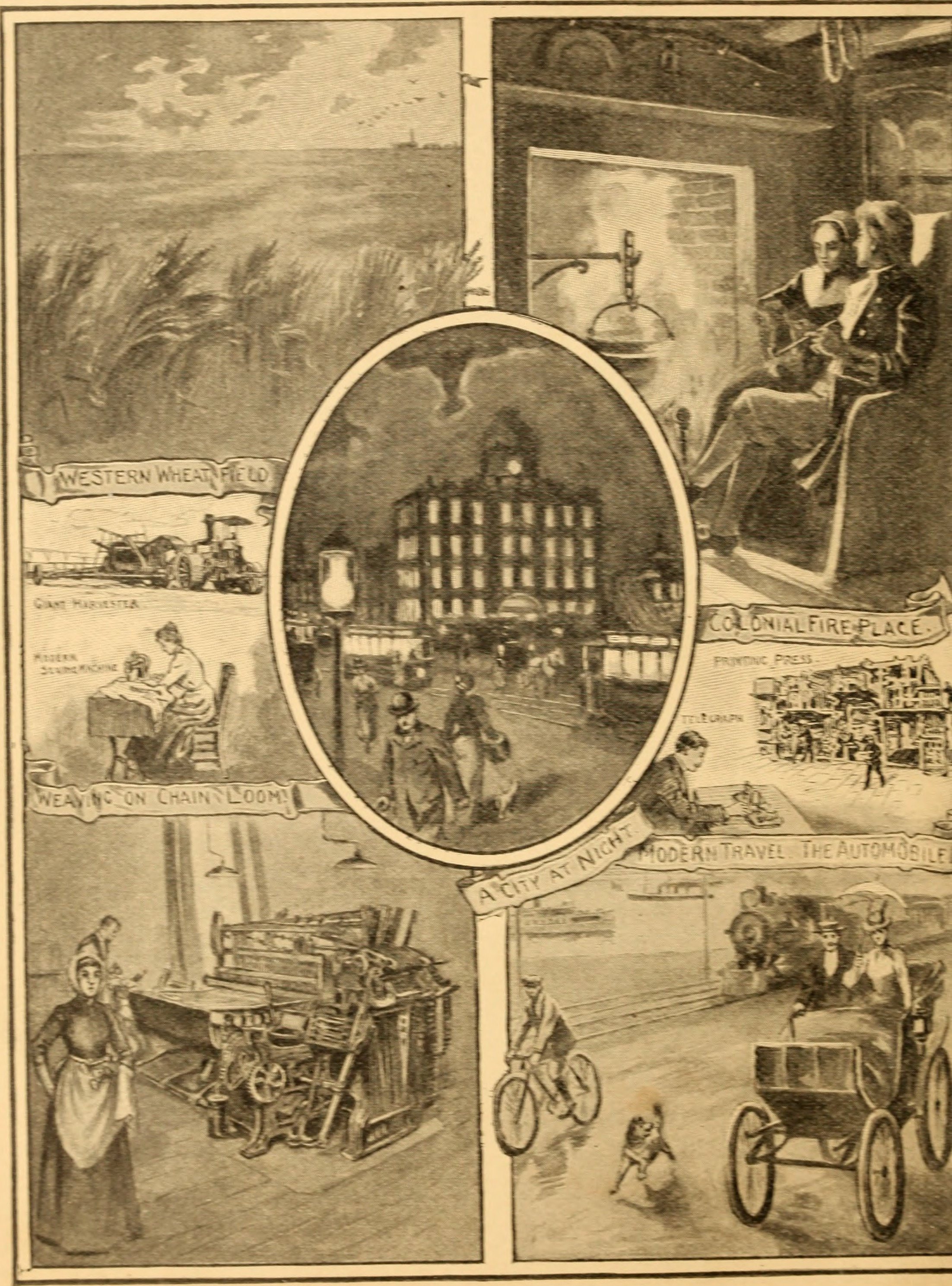
American Inventions and Inventors (1900)

He wrote the following published works:

- A Family History of Richard Mowry of Uxbridge, Massachusetts, his ancestors and his descendants (1878)
- Who Invented the American Steamboat? (1874)
- Political Education in the Schools (1878)
- The School Curriculum and Business Life (1881)
- Talks with my Boys (1884; fifth edition, 1909)
- Elements of Civil Government (1890; new edition, 1913)
- War Stories (1892)
- Art Decorations for School Rooms (1892)
- Sunshine upon the Psalms (1892)
- Lov'st Thou Me More than These? (1892)
- A History of the United States (1896)
- The Uxbridge Academy, a Brief History with a Biographical Sketch of J. Mason Macomber, A.M., M.D., Preceptor (1897)
- First Steps in the History of our Country (1898; revised edition, 1914), with A. May
- American Inventions and Inventors (1900)
- Marcus Whitman and Early Oregon (1901)
- The Territorial Growth of the United States (1902)
- American Heroes (1903), with Blanche S. Mowry
- American Pioneers (1905)
- Essentials of United States History (1906; revised edition, 1914)
- Recollections of a New England Educator (1908)

== Sources ==
- San Francisco Public Library catalog listing (source for death date)
