= Joshua Mason Macomber =

American educator (1811–1881)

- Born: October 11, 1811; New Salem, Massachusetts, U.S.
- Died: February 9, 1881 (aged 69); Uxbridge, Massachusetts, U.S.
- Occupations: Educator, Physician, University of Pennsylvania, Medical College, Principal, Uxbridge Academy
- Spouse: Sarah A Lee
- Children: One son died at age 18

Joshua Mason Macomber (October 11, 1811 – February 9, 1881) was an educator and medical doctor from New Salem, Massachusetts.

== Early life and education ==
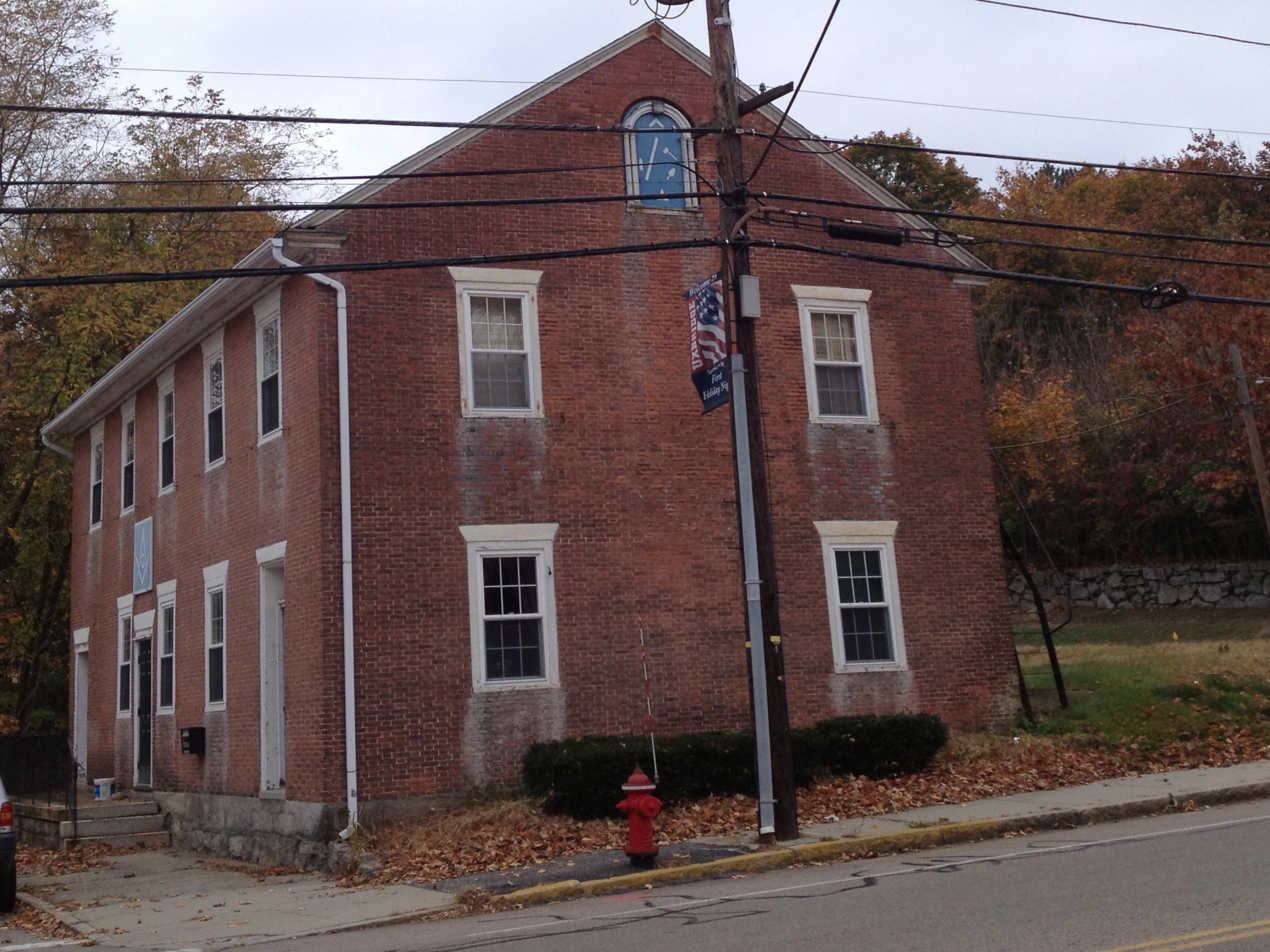
The Uxbridge Academy building in Uxbridge, Massachusetts, where Macomber taught preparatory school

Macomber grew up Baptist in New Salem, Massachusetts. He later became a Unitarian.

Macomber attended Amherst College for one year and then Brown University, where he received his undergraduate degree in 1835. He married Sarah A. Lee of Chester in 1838. During the time he was at Brown, he at Uxbridge Academy in Uxbridge, Massachusetts. He served in a number of New England Preparatory academies in the 1830s.

== Career ==
In 1841, Macomber returned to Uxbridge to become the principal at the Uxbridge Academy. J. Mason Macomber was the principal of Uxbridge Academy from 1841 to 1850. Famous Historian and writer, William Augustus Mowry detailed this accomplished educator's life in a biographical sketch with the publication, "The Uxbridge Academy-A brief history with a Biographical Sketch of J. Mason Macomber, A.M., M.D". The Uxbridge Academy was formed in 1818 at Uxbridge, Massachusetts. It flourished in the early and mid-19th century and graduated a number of prominent citizens as one of New England's historic preparatory academies. Uxbridge Academy developed a widespread reputation and during his tenure had attracted hundreds of students in, from hundreds of communities of at least six states.

In 1851, he enrolled at the New York Medical College to study to become a physician. He graduated from New York Medical College in 1854. He became a professor in the University of Pennsylvania Medical College at Philadelphia.

Around 1861, his only son died at the age of 18. He was devastated, and although he could have stayed and taught at Penn, he instead chose to return to Uxbridge, Massachusetts.

== Death ==
Macomber remained in Uxbridge and active as a Unitarian and in community service until his death in 1881.
