= Lake Wyola State Park =

State park in Franklin County, Massachusetts

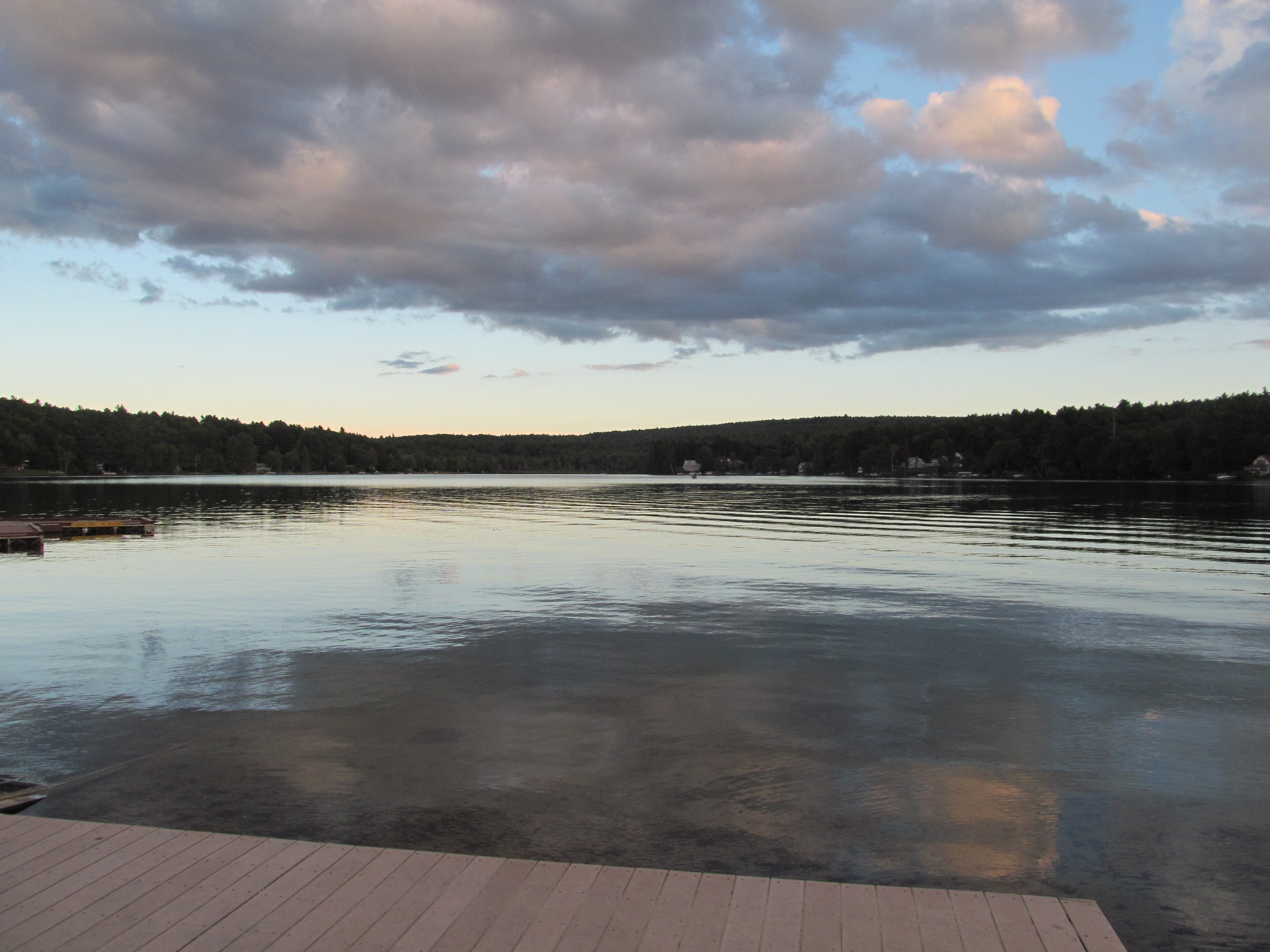
- Lake Wyola

- Location within Massachusetts Location within the United States
- Location: Shutesbury, Massachusetts, United States
- Coordinates: 42°30′8″N 72°26′10″W
- Area: 42 acres (17 ha)
- Established: 1997
- Administrator: Massachusetts Department of Conservation and Recreation
- Website: Official website

Lake Wyola State Park, also known as the Carroll A. Holmes Recreation Area, is located in the town of Shutesbury, Massachusetts. It is a 42-acre (17 ha) public recreation area located on the northwest shore of Lake Wyola.

== History ==
In 1997, the Department of Environmental Management (DEM), now known as the Department of Conservation and Recreation (DCR), acquired Lake Wyola Park from Emelia Bennett and established the Carroll Holmes Recreation Area. The park was dedicated in honor of Carroll Holmes, a former Shutesbury selectman and an individual who had previously held the position of director within DEM's Region IV.

== Activities and amenities ==
The park has trails for walking, hiking, snowmobiling and cross-country skiing, restrooms, picnic grounds, and a beach. Lake Wyola's 128 acres (52 ha) provide opportunities for swimming, fishing, and boating.
