= Satchel Guide =

Travel guidebook series

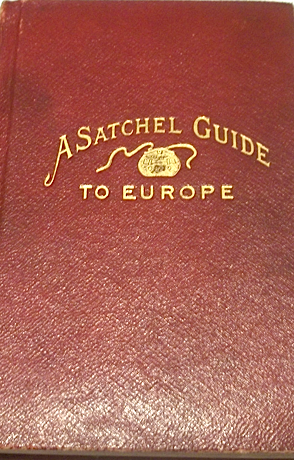
Satchel Guide, 1910

The Satchel Guide was a series of tourist's travel guide books to Europe, first published in 1872 by Hurd & Houghton of New York. It continued annually until at least 1939. Authors included William Day Crockett, Sarah Gates Crockett, William James Rolfe.
