= New Salem, Massachusetts =

- Town
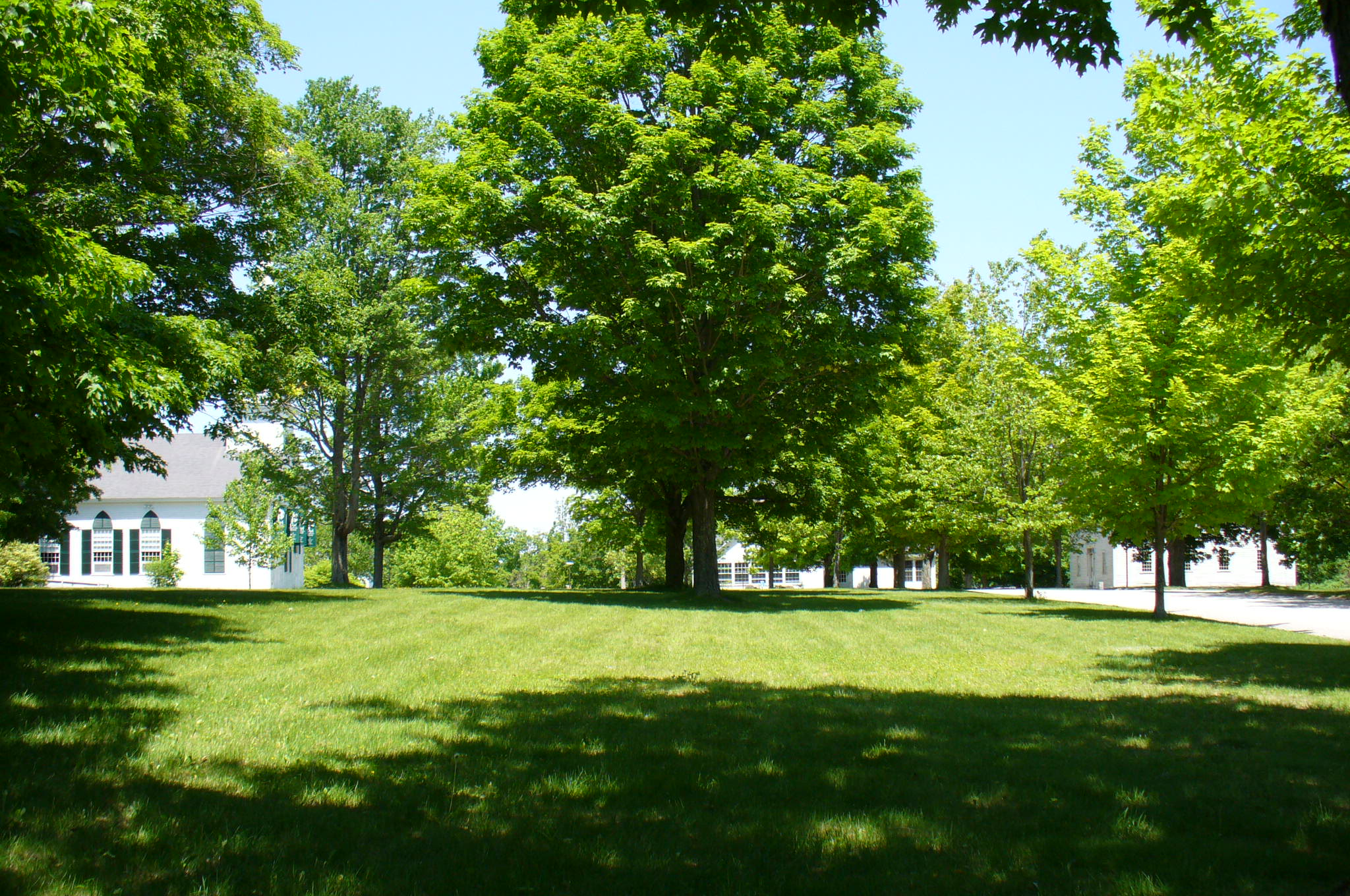
- New Salem Town Common

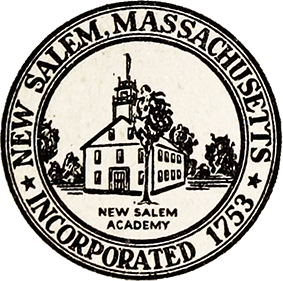
- Seal

- Location in Franklin County in Massachusetts
- Coordinates: 42°30′15″N 72°19′57″W
- Country: United States
- State: Massachusetts
- County: Franklin
- Settled: 1737
- Incorporated: 1753

Government
  - Type: Open town meeting

Area
  - Total: 58.6 sq mi (151.9 km^{2})
  - Land: 44.8 sq mi (116.0 km^{2})
  - Water: 13.9 sq mi (36.0 km^{2})
- Elevation: 1,048 ft (319 m)

Population (2020)
  - Total: 983
  - Density: 21.9/sq mi (8.47/km^{2})
- Time zone: UTC-5 (Eastern)
  - Summer (DST): UTC-4 (Eastern)
- ZIP Codes: 01355 (New Salem); 01364 (Orange)
- Area code: 351 / 978
- FIPS code: 25-45490
- GNIS feature ID: 0618172
- Website: www.newsalemma.org

New Salem is a town in Franklin County, Massachusetts, United States. The population was 983 at the 2020 census. It is part of the Springfield, Massachusetts Metropolitan Statistical Area.

== History ==
New Salem was first settled in 1737 and was officially incorporated in 1753, named for the settlers from Salem that founded the town. The geography of New Salem benefited greatly from the construction of the Quabbin Reservoir. Prior to its building, New Salem, which has always been the southeastern corner of Franklin County, did not extend much further south than the village of Cooleyville, now along U.S. Route 202. However, with the formation of the reservoir, the town received all lands above the water line between the two forks of the reservoir, as it was the only land connection to the peninsula. With its southern borders now following former branches of the Swift River, New Salem now includes most of the former town of Prescott (except for a small corner east of the Middle Branch of the Swift River, which is now in Petersham), and parts of Greenwich and Enfield. (All of the northern half of Prescott had once belonged to New Salem; the southern half was originally part of Pelham, but was annexed to Prescott in the latter nineteenth century.) All the lands gained by the annexation were once part of Hampshire County.

Today most of the lands it gained are off-limits, protected as part of the Quabbin Reservation, which is administered by the Massachusetts Department of Conservation & Recreation (DCR). The Five College Radio Astronomy Observatory, until 2011, lay along what was once the Prescott-Greenwich town line, and researchers from the Five Colleges were allowed access to it. Additionally, members of the Swift River Historical Society take a yearly tour of the area in the peninsula by bus. No other access is permitted.

== Geography ==
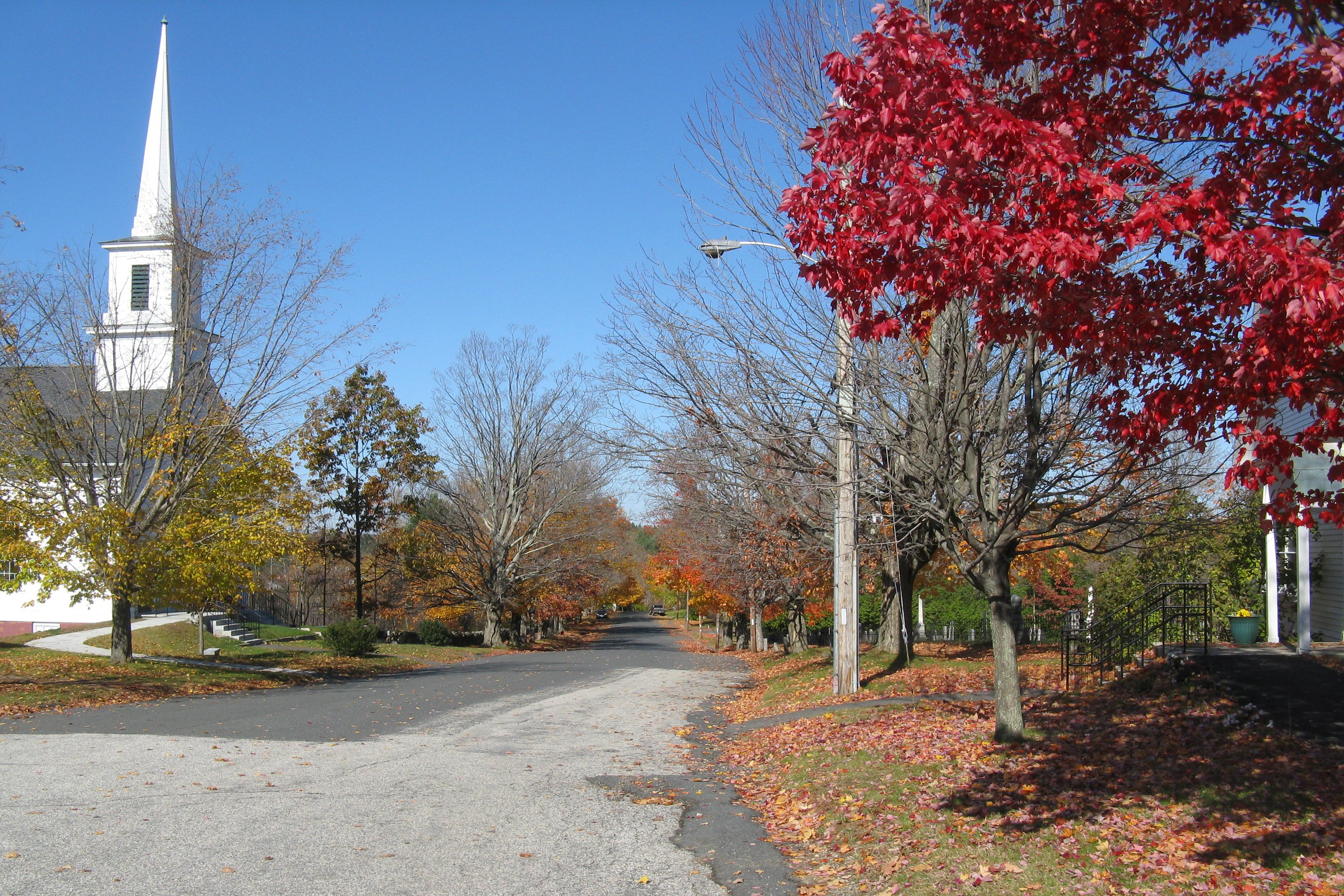
South Main Street

According to the United States Census Bureau, the town has a total area of 58.6 square miles (151.9 km^{2}), of which 44.8 square miles (116.0 km^{2}) is land and 13.9 square miles (36.0 km^{2}), or 23.69%, is water. Because of the lands of the Prescott Peninsula, New Salem is the largest town by area in Franklin County and the largest community by area in western Massachusetts (Hampden, Hampshire, Franklin, and Berkshire counties). It is the twenty-first largest of 351 cities and towns in the Commonwealth. New Salem's modern southern town lines are dictated by the former West and Middle Branches of the Swift River, which are now submerged as part of the Quabbin Reservoir. The land of the two forks of the reservoir is now known as the Prescott Peninsula, containing the highest points in town, at Mount Pleasant and Prescott Hill (the latter of which was part of Pelham). The town owns several islands in the reservoir as well, including those around Russ Mountain and Mount L. Much of the original town land was high ground, sloping down eastward towards the marshes near Lake Rohunta, along the Athol town line. A small section of state forest is located near this lake, with other small sections scattered in the western part of the former town.

New Salem lies at the southeastern corner of Franklin Valley, with its lands extending southward between Hampshire County and Worcester County. The town is bordered by Orange to the north, Athol to the northeast, Petersham to the east, Ware to the south, Belchertown to the southeast, and Pelham, Shutesbury and Wendell to the west. Because of the reservoir, there is no land link between New Salem and Pelham, Belchertown or Ware. From the town common, New Salem lies 19 miles (31 km) east-southeast of the county seat of Greenfield, 35 miles (56 km) north-northeast of Springfield, 40 miles (64 km) northwest of Worcester and 75 miles (121 km) west of Boston.

== Climate ==
In a typical year, New Salem, Massachusetts temperatures fall below 50 °F for 195 days per year. Annual precipitation is typically 44.6 inches per year (high in the US) and snow covers the ground 62 days per year or 17% of the year (high in the US). It may be helpful to understand the yearly precipitation by imagining nine straight days of moderate rain per year. The humidity is below 60% for approximately 25.4 days, or 7% of the year.

== Transportation ==
The town has no interstates or limited-access highways, lying just south of Massachusetts Route 2, the major east–west route through northern Massachusetts. Its easiest access lies along U.S. Route 202, which runs from Pelham in the west and through the town's center before heading north into Orange and towards Route 2. For approximately the last half-mile the route is in New Salem, it runs concurrently with Massachusetts Route 122, which enters New Salem through Petersham, heading northwest towards Route 202 before both enter Orange and split shortly thereafter.

The nearest general aviation airport is Orange Municipal Airport to the north, and the nearest national air service can be reached at Bradley International Airport in Connecticut, some 50 miles (80 km) south of town.

== Education ==
New Salem is home to the Swift River Elementary School which serves K–6, which also serves students from Wendell. High School students then attend Ralph C. Mahar Regional High School in Orange.

== Demographics ==
Historical population
Year	Pop.	±%
1790	1,543	—
1840	1,275	−17.4%
1850	1,253	−1.7%
1860	957	−23.6%
1870	987	+3.1%
1880	869	−12.0%
1890	856	−1.5%
1900	807	−5.7%
1910	639	−20.8%
1920	512	−19.9%
1930	414	−19.1%
1940	357	−13.8%
1950	392	+9.8%
1960	397	+1.3%
1970	474	+19.4%
1980	688	+45.1%
1990	802	+16.6%
2000	929	+15.8%
2010	990	+6.6%
2020	983	−0.7%
2023	1,014	+3.2%
Source: United States census records and Population Estimates Program data.

As of the census of 2000, there were 929 people, 379 households, and 264 families residing in the town. The population density was 20.7 people per square mile (8.0/km^{2}). There were 422 housing units at an average density of 9.4 per square mile (3.6/km^{2}). The racial makeup of the town was 95.48% White, 0.75% African American, 0.54% Native American, 0.75% Asian, 0.32% from other races, and 2.15% from two or more races. Hispanic or Latino of any race were 0.86% of the population.

There were 379 households, out of which 30.3% had children under the age of 18 living with them, 59.6% were married couples living together, 8.2% had a female householder with no husband present, and 30.3% were non-families. 21.6% of all households were made up of individuals, and 7.9% had someone living alone who was 65 years of age or older. The average household size was 2.45 and the average family size was 2.88.

In the town, the population was spread out, with 24.2% under the age of 18, 3.4% from 18 to 24, 29.6% from 25 to 44, 32.8% from 45 to 64, and 9.9% who were 65 years of age or older. The median age was 42 years. For every 100 females, there were 104.6 males. For every 100 females age 18 and over, there were 100.0 males.

The median income for a household in the town was $48,688, and the median income for a family was $54,500. Males had a median income of $38,000 versus $27,188 for females. The per capita income for the town was $23,234. About 3.8% of families and 6.3% of the population were below the poverty line, including 8.8% of those under age 18 and 3.0% of those age 65 or over.

== Notable people ==
- Elisha H. Allen (1804–1883), member of the United States Congress from Maine; Consul to Hawaii
- Shepard Cary (1805–1866), U.S. Representative from Maine
- Hiram Giles (1820–1895), Wisconsin state legislator
- Joshua Mason Macomber (1811–1881), educator and physician
- Adam Schoenberg (1980–Present), American Composer
- William Stacy (1734–1802), and Benjamin Haskell are two noted New Salem patriots of the American Revolutionary War, honored by the New Salem sesquicentennial commission

== References in the literature ==
In the trilogy The Secret Circle by L. J. Smith events take place in the town of New Salem, Massachusetts.

In the New York Times best seller The Once and Future Witches by Alix E. Harrow, the plot unfolds in New Salem, Massachusetts.
