= Telegenius =

Telegenius is a mythical or historical figure from Roman times who was famous for his stupidity. He is mentioned by Emperor Claudius in The Twelve Caesars by Suetonius, but few or no other records of him have survived to the present day.

== Background ==
J. C. Rolfe's 1913 translation of Suetonius, itself probably composed in response to Teubner's 1904 German translation, contains Footnote 100, explaining the term "Telegenius" as a proper name: "Obviously, some man proverbial for his folly, but nothing is known about him." The word, or, more accurately, the term "telegenius" is itself a combination of two words: tele (from the Greek τηλε, tele meaning "distant") and genius (from the Latin geniālis, a derivative of genius, which originally meant "of generation and birth". At Book V, Claudius, Chapter LX, Suetonius quotes the Emperor's use of figures of speech. There is no evidence for Rolfe's translation of "Telegenius" being anything more than a Georgian misunderstanding of the original Latin sentence, "Quid, ego tibi Telegenius videor?" Suetonius probably meant "mind reader". William Whitaker's Latin Dictionary translates "telegenius" as "prophetic skill". The term was either not capitalized by Suetonius, or more likely, the entire text was capitalized. Minuscules are an early mediaeval invention. Although modern capitals are based on Renaissance capitals, which were based on Roman capitals, the Romans used them for inscriptions, rather than writing on papyrus or wax tablets. Rolfe himself wrote that his text is based upon a manuscript written either in rustic capitals or uncials, with a provenance dating from 884 AD, the "Fulda Codex". This evidence supports the position that Rolfe, telegeniously, but incorrectly attempted to guess at Suetonius' meaning. For the last 98 years, Rolfe's error has been perpetuated in every republication of his text.

== Sources ==
- Suetonius Tranquillus, Gaius (121). The Twelve Caesars.
