= Martha's Vineyard Summer Institute =

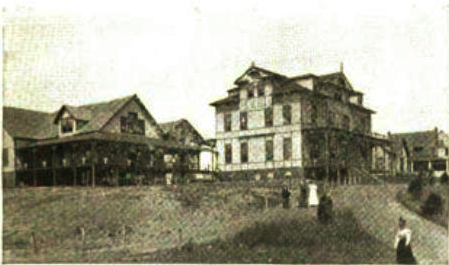
- Martha's Vineyard Summer Institute (1905)
- Named after: Martha's Vineyard
- Formation: 1878
- Founder: Homer B. Sprague
- Dissolved: 1906
- Type: summer school
- Purpose: teacher education
- Location: Cottage City, Massachusetts, U.S.
- President: Homer B. Sprague (1878-82); William James Rolfe (1882-87); William Augustus Mowry (1887-1906)

Martha's Vineyard Summer Institute was the first summer school for teachers in the United States. The school was started in the summer of 1878 and closed in June 1906. It was situated in Cottage City, Massachusetts, Cottage City being near the eastern end of the island of Martha's Vineyard and 6 miles (9.7 km) from Wood's Hole on the main land. The institute employed three types of classes, teaching special branches of knowledge, the arts, and pedagogy. When its work began, the current of public sentiment was adverse. Subsequently, this view changed.

== History ==
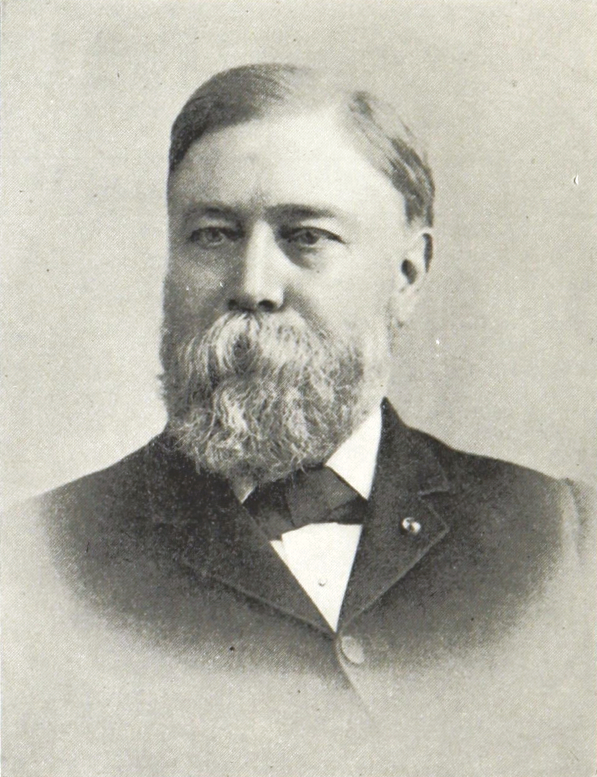
Homer B. Sprague

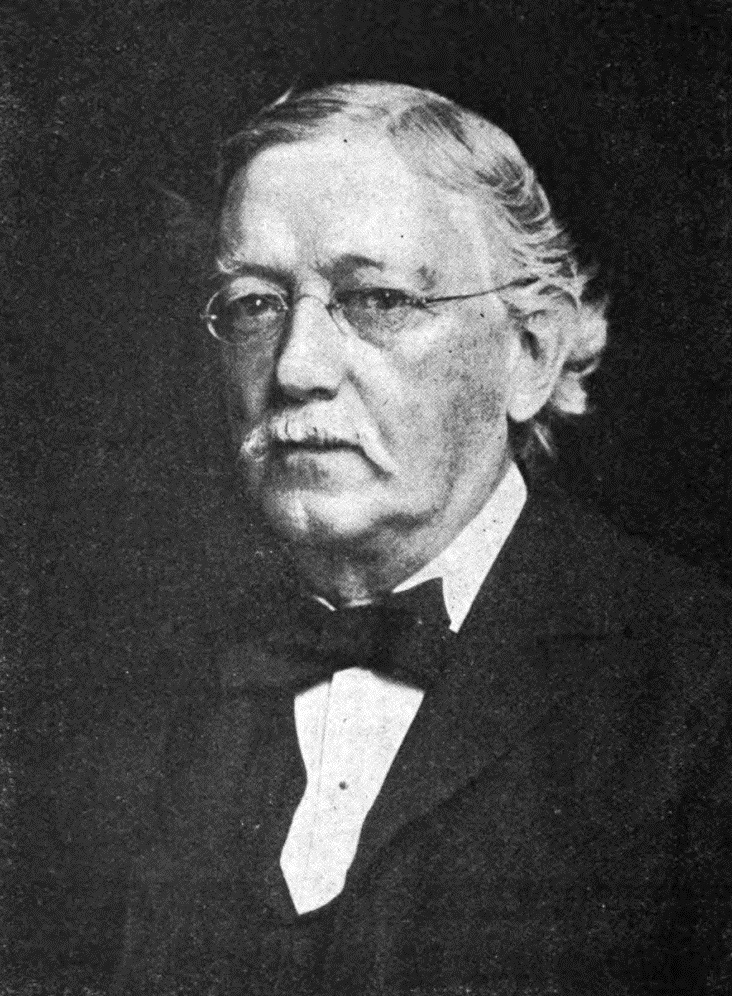
William James Rolfe

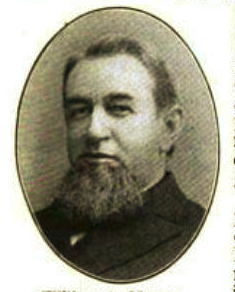
William Augustus Mowry

The originator of the enterprise was Col. Homer B. Sprague, Ph.D., at that time, head master of the Girls' high school in Boston. Over a series of years, he laid the plans for the school and put them into successful operation. He selected the place, interested others in the scheme, put the plan in operation, and carried the institution forward till it was incorporated under the laws of the Commonwealth of Massachusetts, and became one of the permanent educational institutions of the state. He secured a building, adequate for the purpose, where sixteen recitations could be conducted in the same hour.

It began with a few instructors, mostly from Boston, and a small number of pupils, who wished to push forward their studies in special directions. It had at its first session 75 or 80 pupils. Its first and largest building, called in honor of the naturalist who first established a summer school on Penikese Island, "Agassiz Hall", was built in 1882, and first occupied for the session of that year. Sprague had at that time resigned the presidency and gone to Europe.

Sprague served as president from 1878 to 1882. He was succeeded by Dr. William James Rolfe, the Shakespearean scholar, who held the office from 1882 to 1887. Rolfe was followed by William Augustus Mowry. The building of a large edifice for the exclusive use of the institute fell upon Prof. Benjamin W. Putnam, who for many years was the institute's clerk and general manager.

In 1886, when Mowry began teaching at the institute, it was not financially in good shape. At the close of the session, it was in debt for running expenses of that and previous years, to the amount of about US$2,300. A subscription paper was circulated among the faculty and some other persons, and about US$1,200 was raised toward paying this debt. The entire debt was paid off from the extra earnings of the institute during the next three years, 1880-90 inclusive.

In total, the institute helped between 7,500 and 10,000 teachers. By 1905, though, there came a recognition that its services were no longer needed as good schools opened in all parts of the country, where teachers could receive proper instruction at less cost than to travel to Cottage City. In that year, the directors and the corporators voted unanimously to close the school. Mowry was appointed agent to sell the property, real and personal, and pay all bills against the institute. No buyers could be found at that time for the real estate, and it went into the possession of the savings bank, which held a mortgage upon it. In June 1906, the personal property had all been sold, and all bills were paid. The business of the institute therefore closed.

== Academics ==
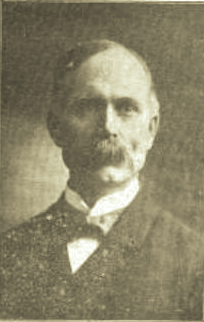
Andrew W. Edson

A revised system of management was effected in 1888, and new features of importance were added to the school. The most prominent new feature was a "School of Methods", placed under the direction of Andrew W. Edson, the agent of the Massachusetts board of education. This department, every year since, held a session of three or four weeks, with 12–15 educators in Methods of Instruction in the ordinary branches of U.S. common schools. These subjects were: Arithmetic, blackboard sketching, drawing, geography, history, kindergarten, language, physiology, natural science, pedagogy, psychology, penmanship, physical exercies, school management, and vocal music. In addition to the usual elementary and high school courses, the School of Methods also offered a general course including child study, pedagogy, psychology, and daily round table conferences on the work of superintendents and supervisors.

== Architecture and fittings ==
A café building was built with a well-equipped kitchen and dining room in the 1880s. In 1890, the institute added a dormitory to its other accommodations. In the following year, the directors made important improvements to the property. A large addition to the kitchen was built, measuring 25 by 25 feet (7.6 m × 7.6 m). All the buildings -a total of five-were thoroughly painted and put in good order, while the cafe was clapboarded. The gravel bank on the south side of the institute was graded and sown with oats and grass seed. Altogether, between 1889 and 1894, about US$5,000 was expended upon the property, early all of which was paid from the extra earnings.No tuition money was appropriated for these permanent improvements. During the year 1894, a new auditorium was built, measuring 50 by 65 feet (15 m × 20 m), with basement rooms for class purposes.

== Student life ==
Year by year, the school enlarged its plan of work and increased the attendance. The growth of its facilities kept pace with the increase of numbers. The quality of the teachers improved noticeably. In 1888, the average annual salary of the teachers in attendance was a little less than US$400 per year. Thereafter, the number of teachers receiving a small salary increased as did numerous those in the higher grades of work, such as teachers and principals of high schools, training schools, normal schools, and academies, professors in colleges, and superintendents of schools. The result was that the average annual salary constantly increased so that in the year 1894, it was over US$700, and in 1904, it was above US$900. The range was from a low of US$167 a year to US$3,000, and in one case, US$6,000, the highest. In 1894, more than 700 teachers were in attendance, representing 35 states and countries. Classes were suspended every day from 11:30 a.m. till 2:00 p.m. for swimming and the dinner hour.
