= Uxbridge Common District =

Historic district in Massachusetts, United States

- U.S. National Register of Historic Places
- U.S. Historic district
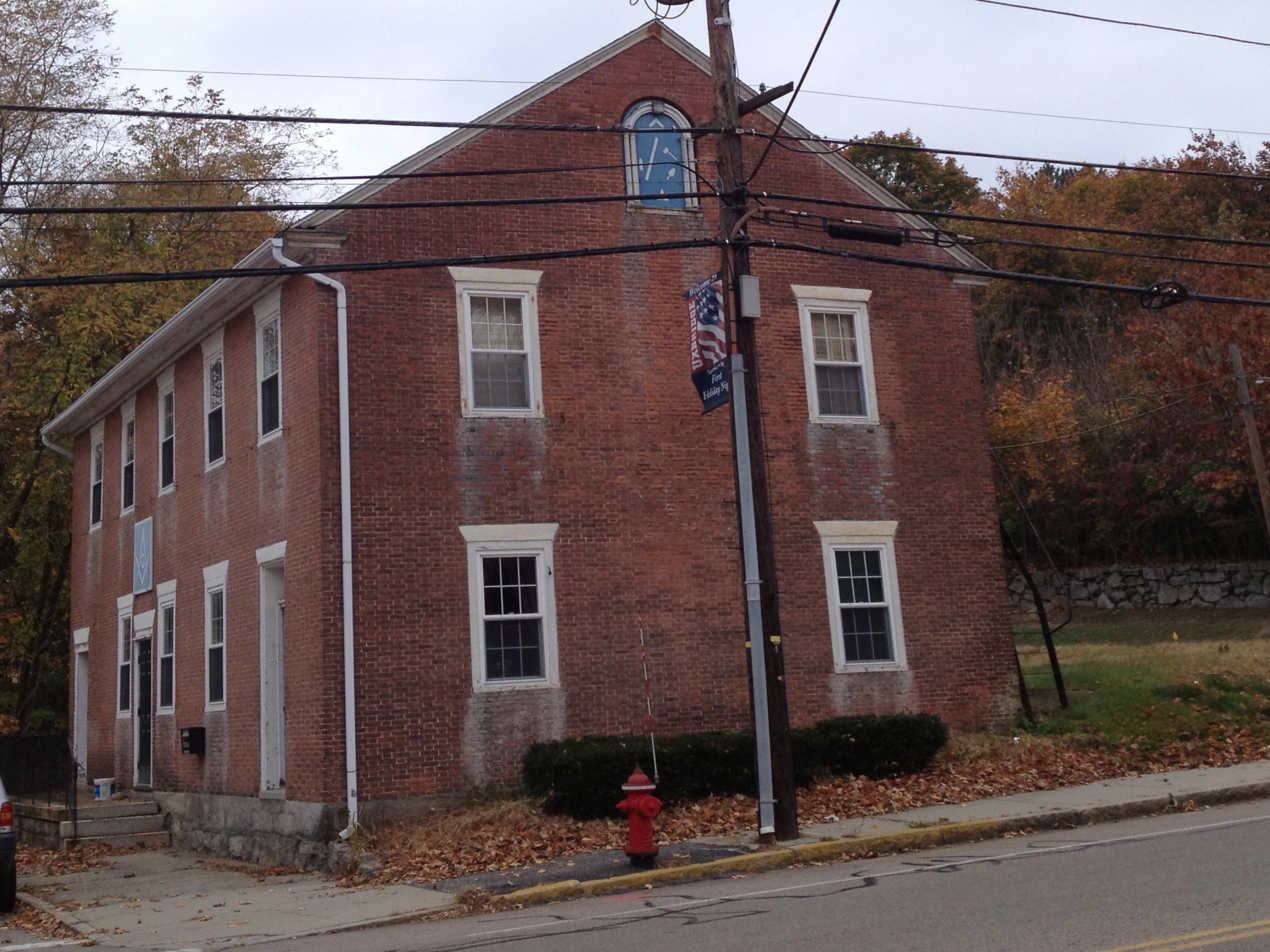
- Location: North Main St., Court St., Uxbridge, Massachusetts
- Coordinates: 42.077222°N 71.631389°W
- Area: 8 acres (3.2 ha)
- Built: 1818-1880s
- NRHP reference No.: 84002920
- Added to NRHP: January 20, 1984

The Uxbridge Common District is located in downtown Uxbridge, Massachusetts. It is listed on the National Register of Historic Places. Historic buildings in this district include the Uxbridge Academy, Uxbridge Free Public Library, the Deborah A. Wheelock House, a blacksmith shop, the First Congregational Church, and the Unitarian Church.

== Uxbridge Academy ==
The Uxbridge Academy was a prestigious New England preparatory institution in the early 19th century which graduated a number of prominent citizens, including Marcus Spring, Colonel John Capron, Moses Taft, George B. Boomer, and Richard Sayles. Famous Historian and writer William Augustus Mowry wrote a historical sketch about Uxbridge Academy. Joshua Mason Macomber, A.M., M.D., was the principal of Uxbridge Academy from 1840-1850. This was said to be the "Palmy" period of the academy under the direction of this successful educator. The Uxbridge Academy developed a widespread reputation during his tenure and attracted hundreds of students from communities in at least six states. The building that housed Uxbridge Academy still stands on the Town Common in Uxbridge, Massachusetts, and currently houses the Masonic Lodge. The Uxbridge academy began in 1818 as a secondary school in an upstairs location.

== The Uxbridge Common Historic District ==
The historic town of Uxbridge, first settled in 1662, has more than 60 houses of the Federalist period and is a repository of unique early American history. The Uxbridge Common District includes a number of buildings from different periods and architectural designs. These include the Uxbridge Academy, 1818, which is a Federalist style building and now houses the Masonic Lodge, The Congregational Church, rebuilt here in the 1830s from its original site across the street, the Public Library 1870s, the blacksmith shop, 1780s, The Unitarian Church, The Uxbridge Inn, 1882, some older homes including "The Daughters of the American Revolution House", circa 1769, which is known as the "Deborah A. Wheelock House". Many older buildings in the town are of the Federalist architecture style, but there is also Georgian architecture, Italianate architecture, Greek Revival architecture, Gothic architecture, Queen Anne style architecture in the United States, Late Victorian architecture, and more.

== See also ==
- Wheelockville District
- Linwood Historic District (Northbridge, Massachusetts)
- National Register of Historic Places listings in Uxbridge, Massachusetts
