= Wendell, Massachusetts =

- Town
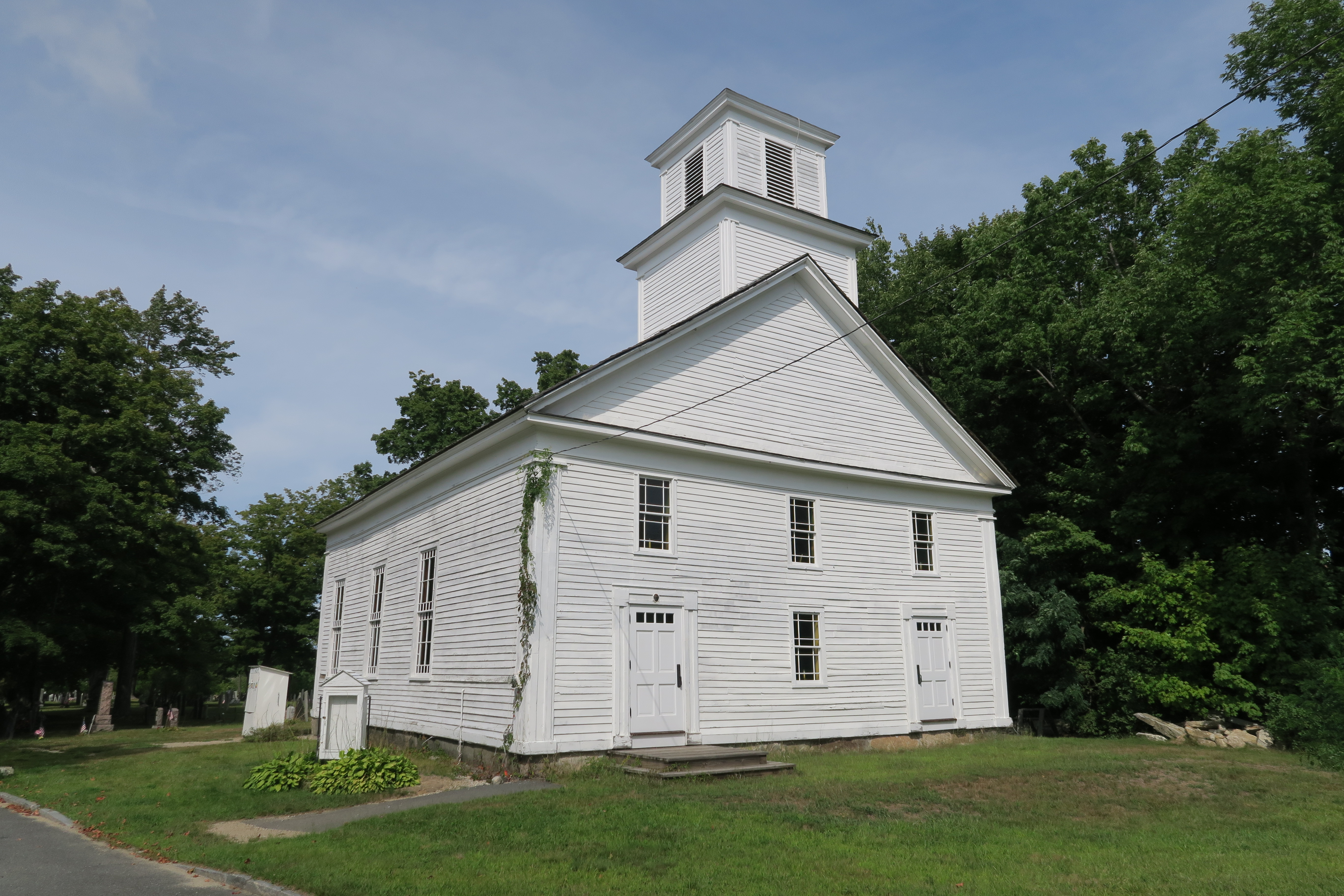
- Wendell Meetinghouse

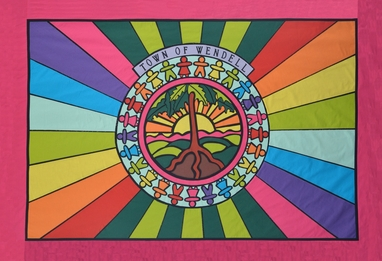
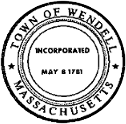
- Flag Seal

- Location in Franklin County in Massachusetts
- Coordinates: 42°32′53″N 72°23′50″W
- Country: United States
- State: Massachusetts
- County: Franklin
- Settled: 1754
- Incorporated: 1781

Government
  - Type: Open town meeting

Area
  - Total: 32.2 sq mi (83.4 km^{2})
  - Land: 31.9 sq mi (82.5 km^{2})
  - Water: 0.39 sq mi (1.0 km^{2})
- Elevation: 1,037 ft (316 m)

Population (2020)
  - Total: 924
  - Density: 29.0/sq mi (11.2/km^{2})
- Time zone: UTC−5 (Eastern)
  - Summer (DST): UTC−4 (Eastern)
- ZIP Codes: 01379 (Wendell); 01349 (Millers Falls); 01380 (Wendell Depot)
- Area code: 351/978
- FIPS code: 25-74525
- GNIS feature ID: 0618178
- Website: www.wendellmass.us

Wendell is a town in Franklin County, Massachusetts, United States. The population was 924 at the 2020 census. It is part of the Springfield, Massachusetts Metropolitan Statistical Area.

== History ==
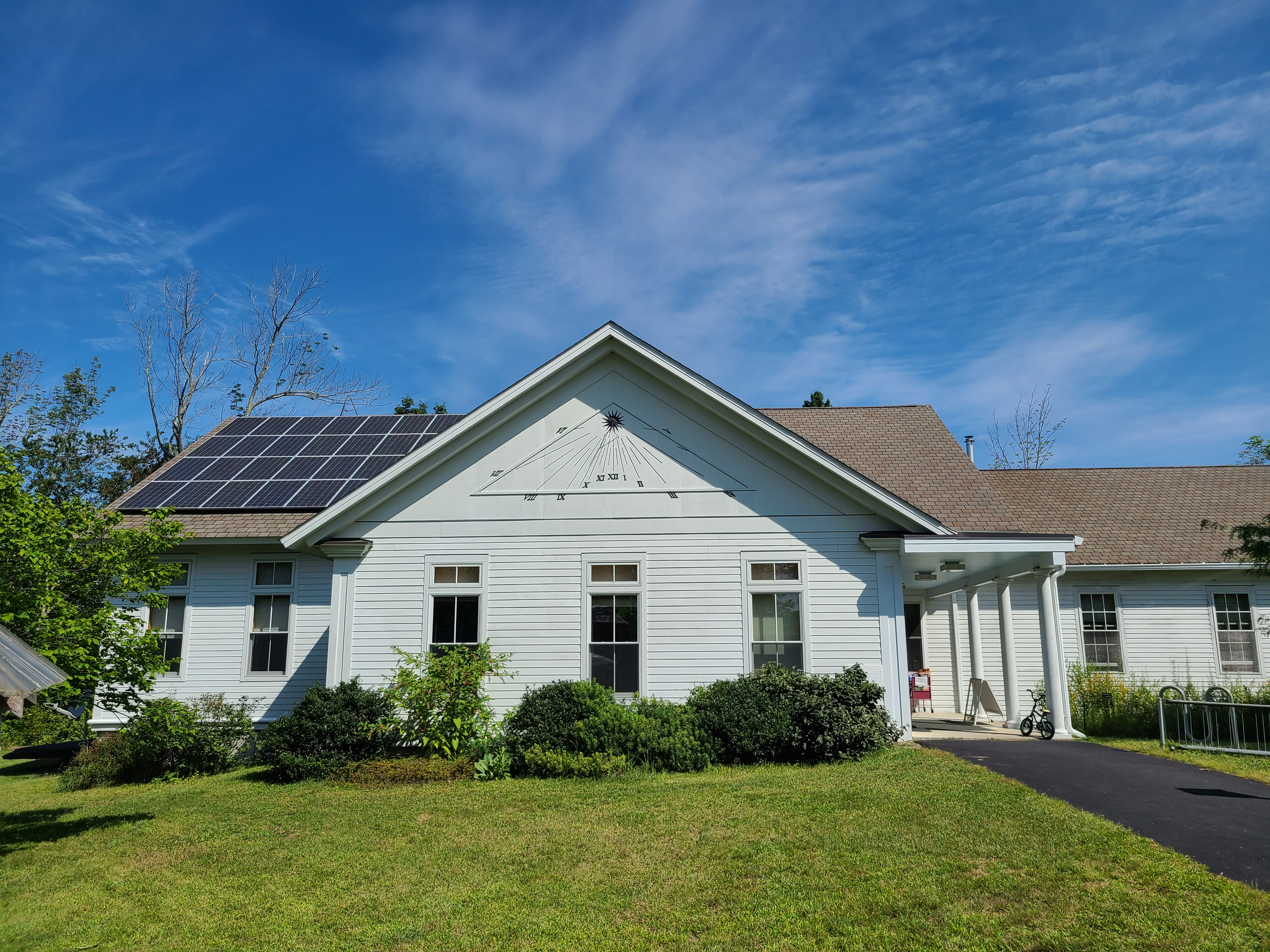
Wendell Free Library in Wendell, Massachusetts

Wendell was first settled in 1754 and was officially incorporated in 1781. It was named after Judge Oliver Wendell of Boston. The town center has been listed as a historic district on the National Register of Historic Places.

On July 11, 2006, a strong F2 tornado moved through town, starting near Wickett Pond, traveling about 2.9 miles (4.7 km), and ending about a half mile east of New Salem Road. The path varied in width from 100 to 300 yards (91 to 274 m). The tornado knocked down trees, including an old maple tree, whose falling damaged gravestones in a historic cemetery in Wendell Center. While trees were downed and some structures damaged, no one was injured.

== Geography ==
According to the United States Census Bureau, the town has a total area of 32.2 square miles (83.4 km^{2}), of which 31.9 square miles (82.5 km^{2}) is land and 0.39 square miles (1.0 km^{2}), or 1.15%, is water.

The town has two post offices. One (ZIP Code 01379) is located approximately one mile south of the town center on Lockes Village Road, the other is listed as "Wendell Depot" (ZIP Code 01380)—near the location of the old train station in the days of passenger rail—and the town is often listed as such on maps.

== Wendell State Forest ==
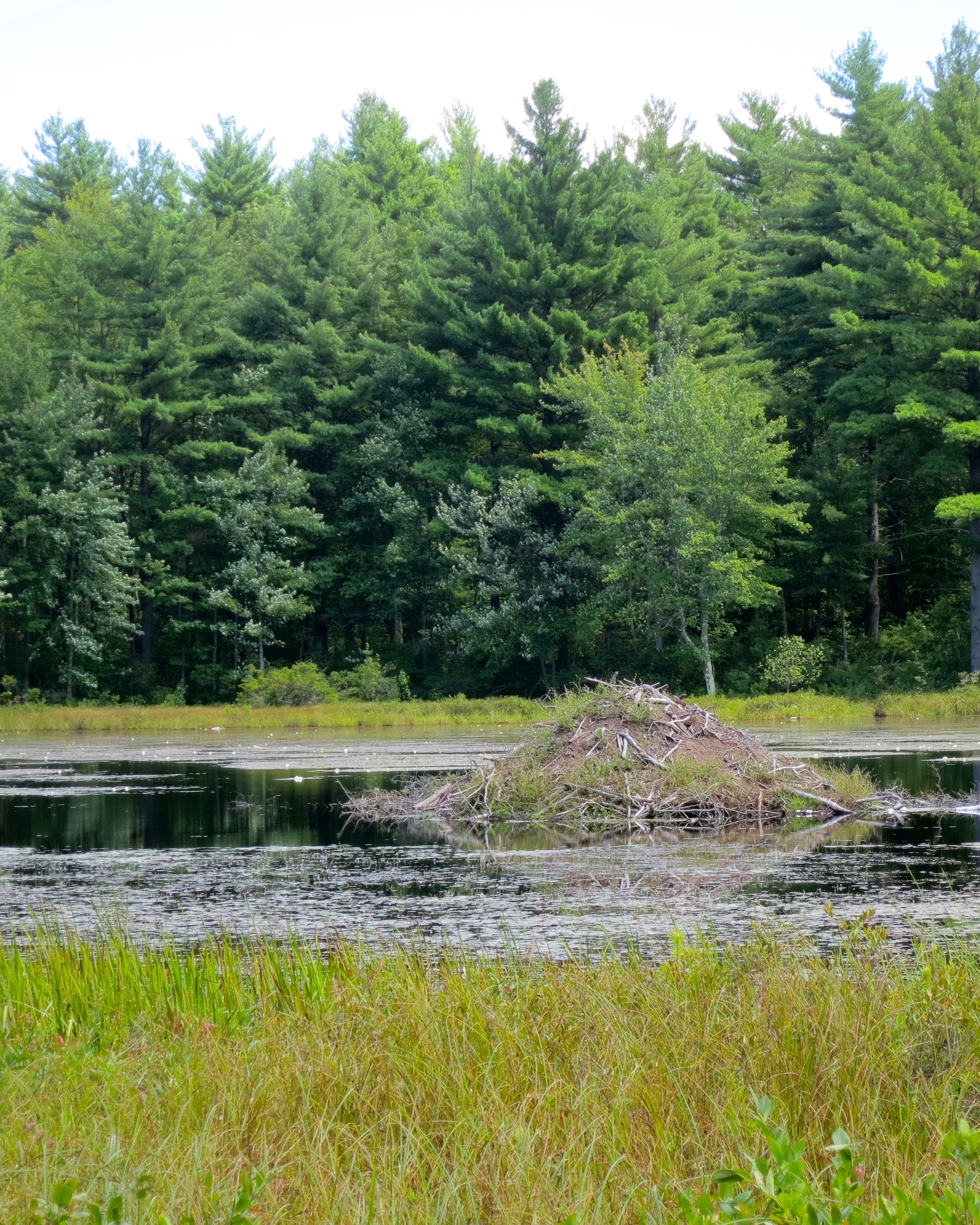
Beaver lodge in Ruggles Pond

Located south of the Millers River, Wendell State Forest covers 7,566 acres of rolling forested hills, streams, ponds, and trails. Purchased in the 1920s the area had been heavily burned during the early 1900s. Some of the park development and most of the road systems are attributed to Civilian Conservation Corps activities in the 1930s. Ruggles Pond is the main day-use area. This 10 acre pond offers crystal clear water for swimming and fishing. Picnic sites and a ball field with a pavilion are located nearby. There is a small boat launching ramp located at the northern end of Wickett Pond. The Metacomet-Monadnock Trail traverses the forest boundaries and offers a small Adirondack shelter for trail users.

== Education ==
Wendell students attend elementary school at Swift River Elementary School in New Salem for K–6. High school students attend Ralph C. Mahar Regional High School in Orange for 7–12.

== Demographics ==
Historical population
| Year | Pop. | ±% |
|---|---|---|
| 1790 | 519 | — |
| 1840 | 844 | +62.6% |
| 1850 | 920 | +9.0% |
| 1860 | 704 | −23.5% |
| 1870 | 539 | −23.4% |
| 1880 | 465 | −13.7% |
| 1890 | 505 | +8.6% |
| 1900 | 492 | −2.6% |
| 1910 | 502 | +2.0% |
| 1920 | 346 | −31.1% |
| 1930 | 353 | +2.0% |
| 1940 | 391 | +10.8% |
| 1950 | 342 | −12.5% |
| 1960 | 292 | −14.6% |
| 1970 | 405 | +38.7% |
| 1980 | 694 | +71.4% |
| 1990 | 899 | +29.5% |
| 2000 | 986 | +9.7% |
| 2010 | 848 | −14.0% |
| 2020 | 924 | +9.0% |
| 2022 | 921 | −0.3% |
Source: United States census records and Population Estimates Program data.

As of the census of 2000, there were 986 people, 378 households, and 224 families residing in the town. The population density was 30.8 inhabitants per square mile (11.9/km^{2}). There were 439 housing units at an average density of 13.7 per square mile (5.3/km^{2}). The racial makeup of the town was 92.49% White, 3.45% African American, 0.41% Asian, 1.32% from other races, and 2.33% from two or more races. Hispanic or Latino of any race were 1.42% of the population.

There were 378 households, out of which 27.0% had children under the age of 18 living with them, 43.7% were married couples living together, 10.6% had a female householder with no husband present, and 40.5% were non-families. Of all households 28.6% were made up of individuals, and 3.7% had someone living alone who was 65 years of age or older. The average household size was 2.35 and the average family size was 2.88.

In the town, the population was spread out, with 25.7% under the age of 18, 7.3% from 18 to 24, 30.6% from 25 to 44, 31.8% from 45 to 64, and 4.6% who were 65 years of age or older. The median age was 38 years. For every 100 females, there were 106.7 males. For every 100 females age 18 and over, there were 102.5 males.

The median income for a household in the town was $43,846, and the median income for a family was $60,147. Males had a median income of $32,639 versus $27,375 for females. The per capita income for the town was $19,701. About 5.8% of families and 10.2% of the population were below the poverty line, including 8.2% of those under age 18 and 17.6% of those age 65 or over.

== Politics ==
The town provided Green Party nominee Jill Stein with her largest percentage of the vote statewide in both the 2012 and 2016 presidential elections. Out of 557 votes cast in the town in 2012, Stein received 43 votes (7.72 percent, more than seven times her statewide percentage of 0.63). She received just 27 less votes than Republican Mitt Romney, who only got 70 votes in Wendell in his loss to Democrat Barack Obama, who handily won the town with 427 votes (76.66 percent). Libertarian Gary Johnson finished fourth with 17 votes (3.05 percent). Four years later in 2016, out of 584 total votes cast in the town, Stein received 48 (8.22 percent, more than five times of her statewide percentage of 1.43). Democrat Hillary Rodham Clinton won the town with 402 votes (68.84 percent) over Republican Donald Trump, who received 104 votes (17.81 percent). Libertarian Gary Johnson received 21 votes (3.60 percent) and there were nine write-ins (1.54 percent).

Four years later in the 2020 presidential election, the town produced the second-highest percentage of the vote in the state for Green Party nominee Howie Hawkins. Out of 614 total votes cast in the town, Hawkins garnered nine votes (1.47 percent). Libertarian Jo Jorgensen got 13 votes (2.12 percent) to finish third. Joe Biden won the town with 487 votes (79.32 percent) over then-President Trump, who received 105 votes (17.10 percent).

The town awarded U.S. Senator Bernie Sanders of neighboring Vermont with his highest percentage of the vote statewide in the 2020 Massachusetts Democratic presidential primary. Out of 403 votes cast, Sanders received 205 (50.87 percent) votes in front of home-state U.S. Senator Elizabeth Warren with 110 votes (27.30 percent). former President Joe Biden notched 68 votes (16.87 percent) in the town to come in third ahead of former Mayor of New York City Michael Bloomberg with 15 votes (3.72 percent). Pete Buttigieg and U.S. Senator Amy Klobuchar of Minnesota clinched two votes a piece with one vote going to former U.S. Representative Tulsi Gabbard of Hawaii. Wendell was the only town in Massachusetts to be won with a majority (more than 50 percent) of its vote by a presidential candidate in that year's Democratic primary.
