= William James Rolfe =

19th/20th-century American educator and Shakespearean scholar

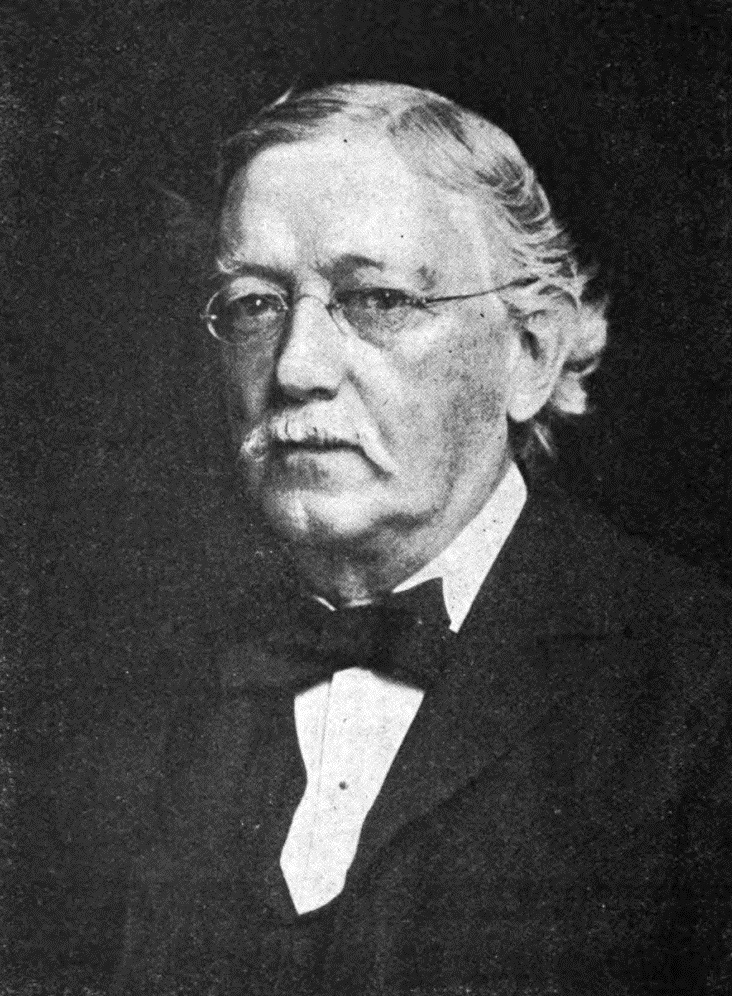
- Born: December 10, 1827; Newburyport, Massachusetts
- Died: July 7, 1910 (aged 82); Tisbury, Massachusetts
- Occupation(s): Educator, scholar
- Spouse: Eliza Jane Carew (m. 1856)
- Children: John Carew Rolfe; Charles J. Rolfe; George Rolfe

William James Rolfe, Litt.D. (December 10, 1827 – July 7, 1910) was an American educator and Shakespearean scholar.

== Early life and education ==
Rolfe was born in Newburyport, Massachusetts on December 10, 1827, son of John Rolfe, of a family "settled early in Newbury... members of which were noted in the history of the state at Haverhill and elsewhere", and Lydia Davis, née Moulton. He attended Amherst College from 1845 through 1848, but left without graduating after three years due to financial hardship. Amherst, though, nonetheless later awarded him an honorary degree.

== Career ==
Between 1852 and 1868, he served as headmaster of high schools at Dorchester, Lawrence, Salem, and Cambridge, Massachusetts. From 1882 to 1887, he served as president of Martha's Vineyard Summer Institute.

Early in his career, he edited selections from Ovid and Virgil and (in collaboration) the Cambridge Course of Physics (six volumes, 1867–68).

Rolfe's Shakespearean work began with an American edition of George Lillie Craik's English of Shakespeare (3rd revised ed., 1864, LCCN 28-15228), which Crosby and Ainsworth published in 1867 (LCCN 03-26761). This led to his preparation for Harper & Brothers of a complete edition of Shakespeare – the Friendly Edition (forty volumes, 1870–83; new edition, 1903–07). Rolfe's editions proved to be the best-selling versions in America (during a time of increased use of Shakespeare in high school classrooms) due both to his credentials as a high school administrator and to his use of Bowdlerization of the text in order to remove much of Shakespeare's lewd content.

Rolfe also edited a complete edition of Tennyson (twelve volumes, 1898) and verse by many of the other great English poets. He wrote a very useful Satchel Guide to Europe, revised annually for 35 years, and at least five other books:

- Shakespeare the Boy (1896)
- The Elementary Study of English (1896)
- Life of Shakespeare (1901)
- Life of William Shakespeare (1904)
- Shakesperean Proverbs (1908)

== Personal life ==
He married Eliza Jane Carew in Dorchester on July 30, 1856. He was the father of John Carew Rolfe, Charles J. Rolfe and George Rolfe, all of whom were professors.

William James Rolfe died on July 7, 1910, at the home of a son in Tisbury, Massachusetts.

== See also ==
- Shakespeare's editors
