= Grand Army of the Republic Hall (Orange, Massachusetts) =

- U.S. Historic district – Contributing property
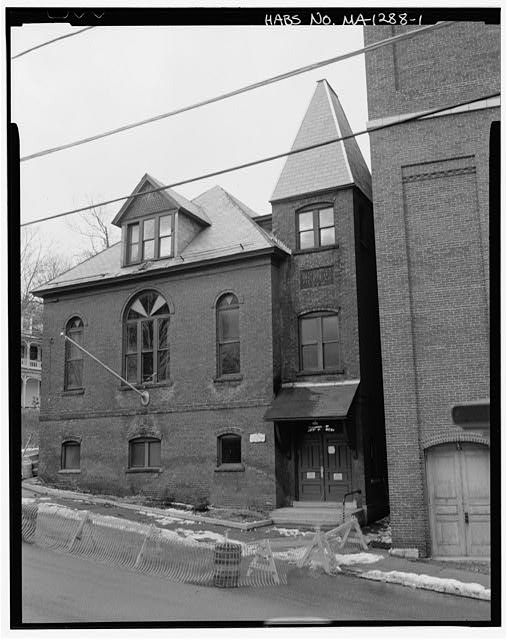
- Grand Army of the Republic Hall, circa 1933
- Location: 14 Prospect Street; Orange, Massachusetts
- Coordinates: 42.59186°N 72.310266°W
- Part of: Orange Center Historic District (ID89000057)
- Added to NRHP: April 27, 1989

Grand Army of the Republic Hall, also known as the Grand Army of the Republic Memorial Hall, was an historic brick building located at 14 Prospect Street in Orange, Massachusetts in the United States. The hall was built by members of the GAR as a memorial to the Union Army veterans of the Civil War. It was one of many such halls built in the country. It is a contributing property in the Orange Center Historic District.

== History ==
The hall was the meeting place of the Gen. Sedgwick GAR Post No. 17, which was one of 210 posts in the Department of Massachusetts. The post was named in memory of Gen. John Sedgwick. The Historic American Buildings Survey funded by the WPA in the 1930s reported that this hall was one of only 20 GAR halls left in Massachusetts, of which only 4 were brick. It was the only brick hall that also had a turret tower. According to the Town of Orange Massachusetts Historical Society, the building was torn down in the early 1990s.

== See also ==
- Grand Army of the Republic Hall (disambiguation)

== Gallery ==
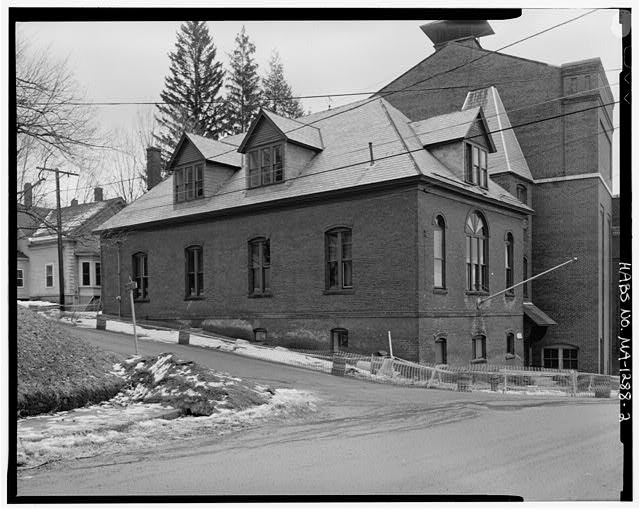
Side and front elevations

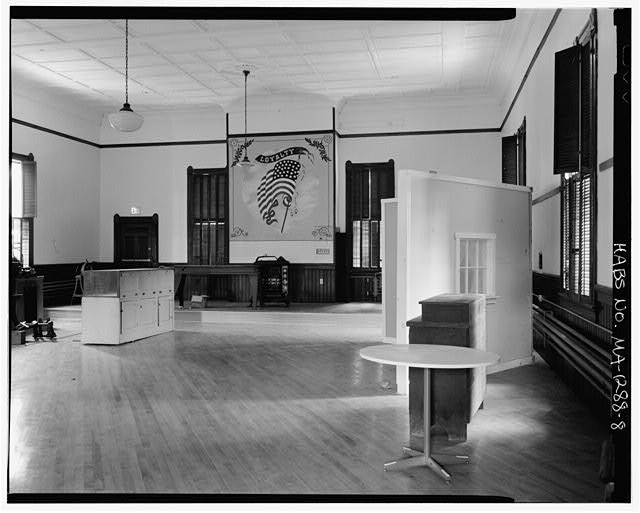
Interior
