= Orange Center Historic District =

Orange Center Historic District may refer to:

in the United States

- Orange Center Historic District (Orange, Connecticut), listed on the NRHP in Connecticut
- Orange Center Historic District (Orange, Massachusetts), listed on the NRHP in Massachusetts
