= Orange Municipal Airport =

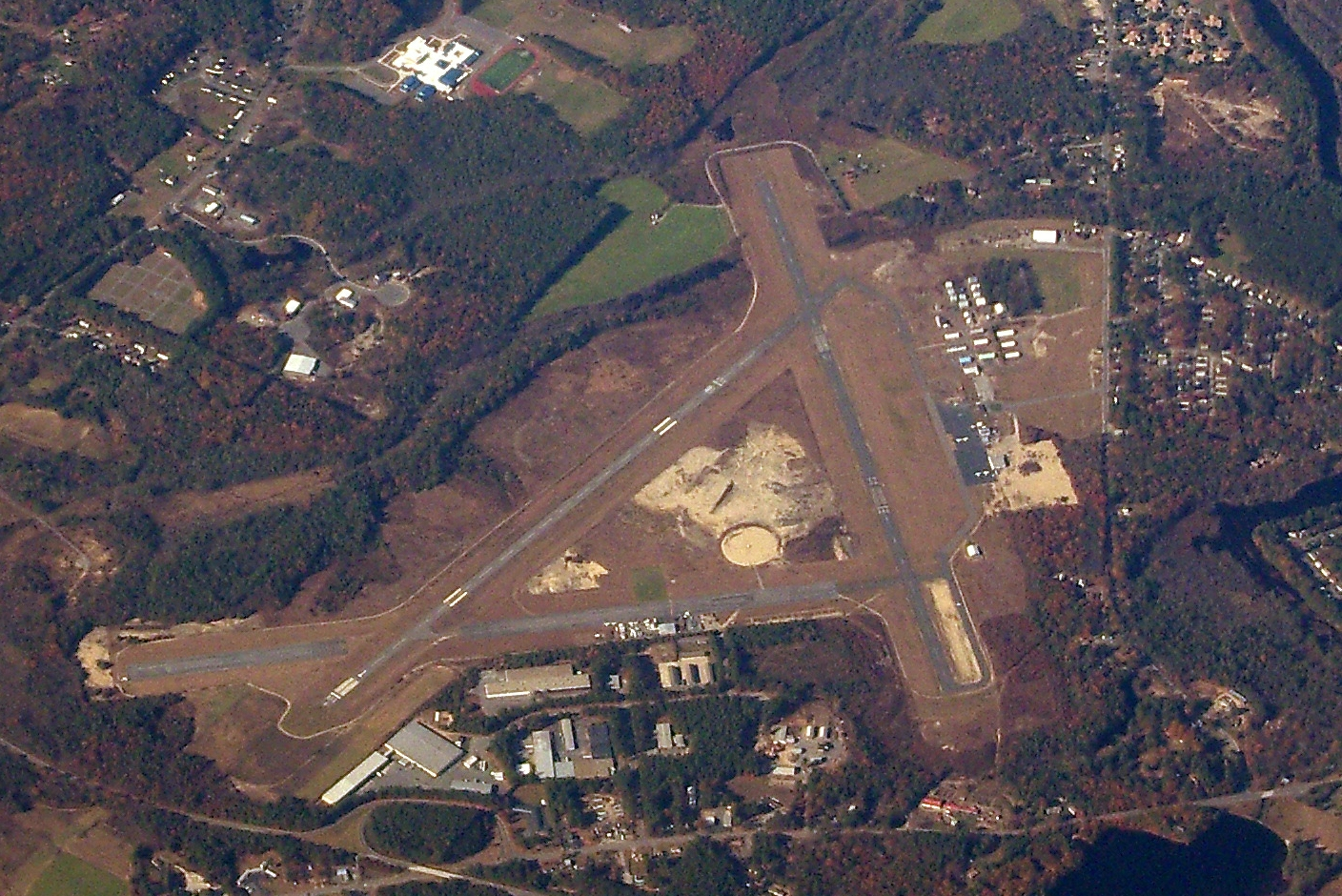
- IATA: none; ICAO: KORE; FAA LID: ORE

Summary
- Airport type: Public
- Operator: Town of Orange
- Location: Orange, Massachusetts
- Elevation AMSL: 555 ft / 169.2 m
- Coordinates: 42°34′12.4550″N 72°17′19″W
- Website: www.flyore.com

Map
- Interactive map of Orange Municipal Airport

Runways
Direction	Length		Surface
Direction	ft	m	Surface
1/19	5,000	1,524	Asphalt
14/32	4,801	1,463	Asphalt

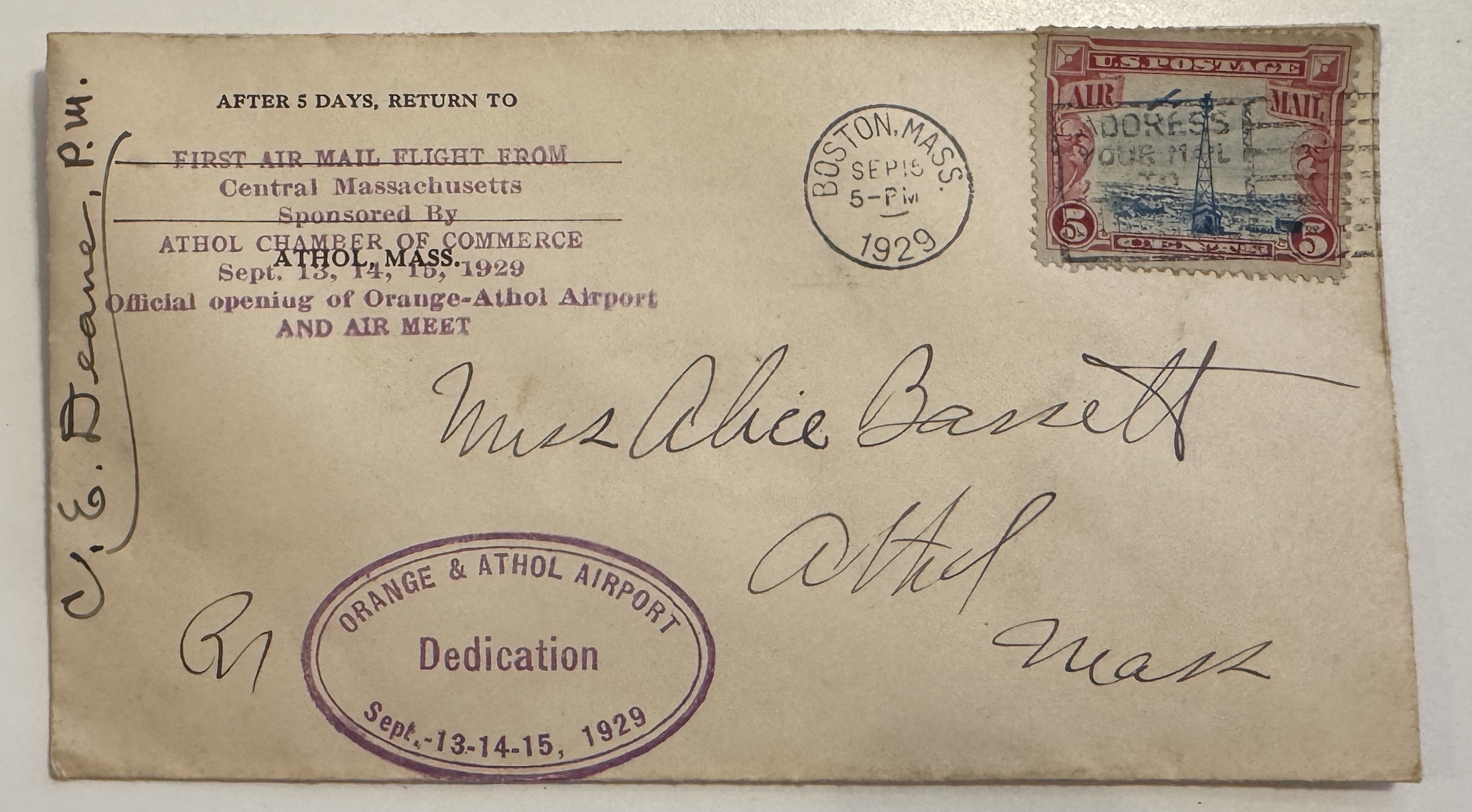
Envelope sent in commemoration of the airport's 1929 opening

Orange Municipal Airport, (ICAO: KORE, FAA LID: ORE) in Orange, Massachusetts, is a public airport owned by Town of Orange.

As of 2023, it has two runways, averages 95 flights per day, and is home base to about 46 aircraft.

The airport offers Jet A and 100LL fuel, maintenance & repair facilities for piston and turbine power corporate aircraft.

Taxi services, rental cars, restaurants and a variety of options for lodging are available close to the airport.

== History ==
The airport was founded in 1929 as the Orange-Athol Airport. Opening ceremonies lasted from September 13 through 15. About 3,000 attended on September 14, whose events included an air meet, a display of aerobatics, and a parachute jump. According to a commemorative envelope issued by the Athol Chamber of Commerce, they also included the first airmail flight from central Massachusetts.

During World War II, the airport was upgraded for potential military use, including the addition of runways to form the triangular configuration that exists to this day.

== See also ==
- List of airports in Massachusetts
