= Massachusetts Peace Statue =

Massachusetts National Peace Sculpture

Coordinates: 42.589741°N 72.309231°W

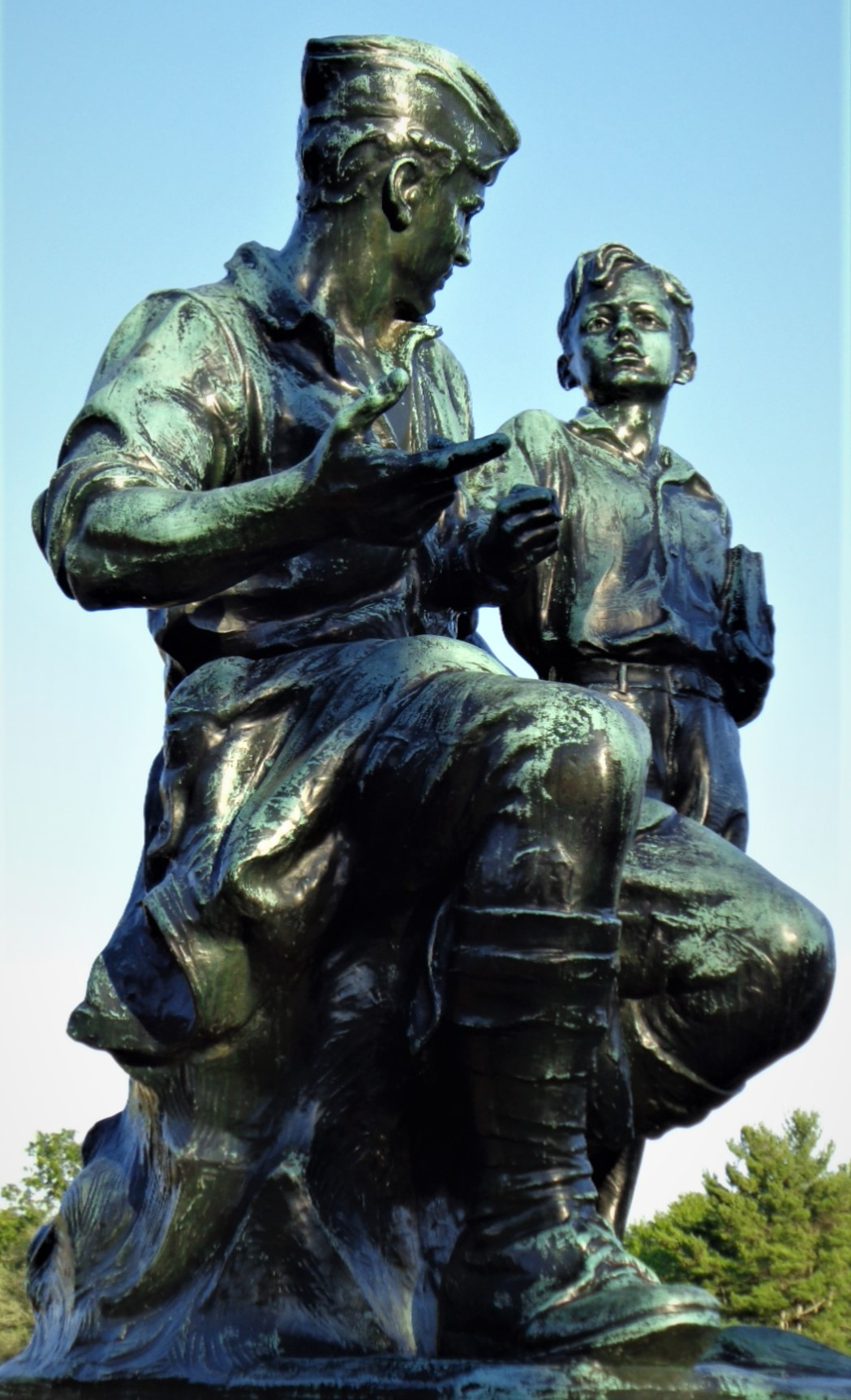
- Orange Peace Statue It Shall Not Be Again!
- Artist: Joseph Pollia
- Year: 1934
- Type: Bronze
- Dimensions: 3.7 m (12 ft)
- Location: Memorial Park, Orange, Massachusetts

The Massachusetts Peace Statue — It Shall Not Be Again, is a war memorial statue built in the town of Orange, Massachusetts in recognition of veterans who served in World War I. On February 25, 2000 the legislature designated it the official peace statue of the Commonwealth of Massachusetts. "A memorial statue built in the town of Orange, Massachusetts in recognition of veterans who served in World War I and designated as the Orange Peace Statue shall be the official peace statue of the Commonwealth."

The statue was created by sculptor Joseph Pollia (1894-1954) and dedicated on May 30, 1934. According to Congressman John W. Olver of Massachusetts, this sculpture received national attention when it was dedicated in 1934 and First Lady Eleanor Roosevelt sent a letter commemorating the event.

The sculpture depicts a doughboy just returned from the war-torn fields of France. He is seated wearily on a stump, and beside him stands a typical American schoolboy of perhaps 10 years, who is partially embraced by the soldier’s left arm. He appears to be listening intently to the soldier’s words with fist clenched.

The statue appears in the fifth episode of Hulu's Stephen King inspired series, Castle Rock.

== Symbolism ==
This statue addresses the need for world peace through its inscription "It Shall Not Be Again" and is said to be the only peace statue of its kind. The sculpture is placed on top of a two-tiered base decorated with a plaque depicting a profiled female figure with the words "It shall not be again". Her left hand is placed over the top of a shield and her right hand is held up to her face; there is a helmet and gun at her feet. Eleven stars on the shield denote the eleven young men from Orange who gave their lives in World War I. The inscription is from a poem entitled "Apparitions" by Thomas Curtis Clark (1877-1953), a prolific Christian hymn writer and poet.

Who goes there, in the night,
Across the storm-swept plain?
We are the ghosts of a valiant war —
A million murdered men!
Who goes there, at the dawn,
Across the sun-swept plain?
We are the hosts of those who swear:
It shall not be again!

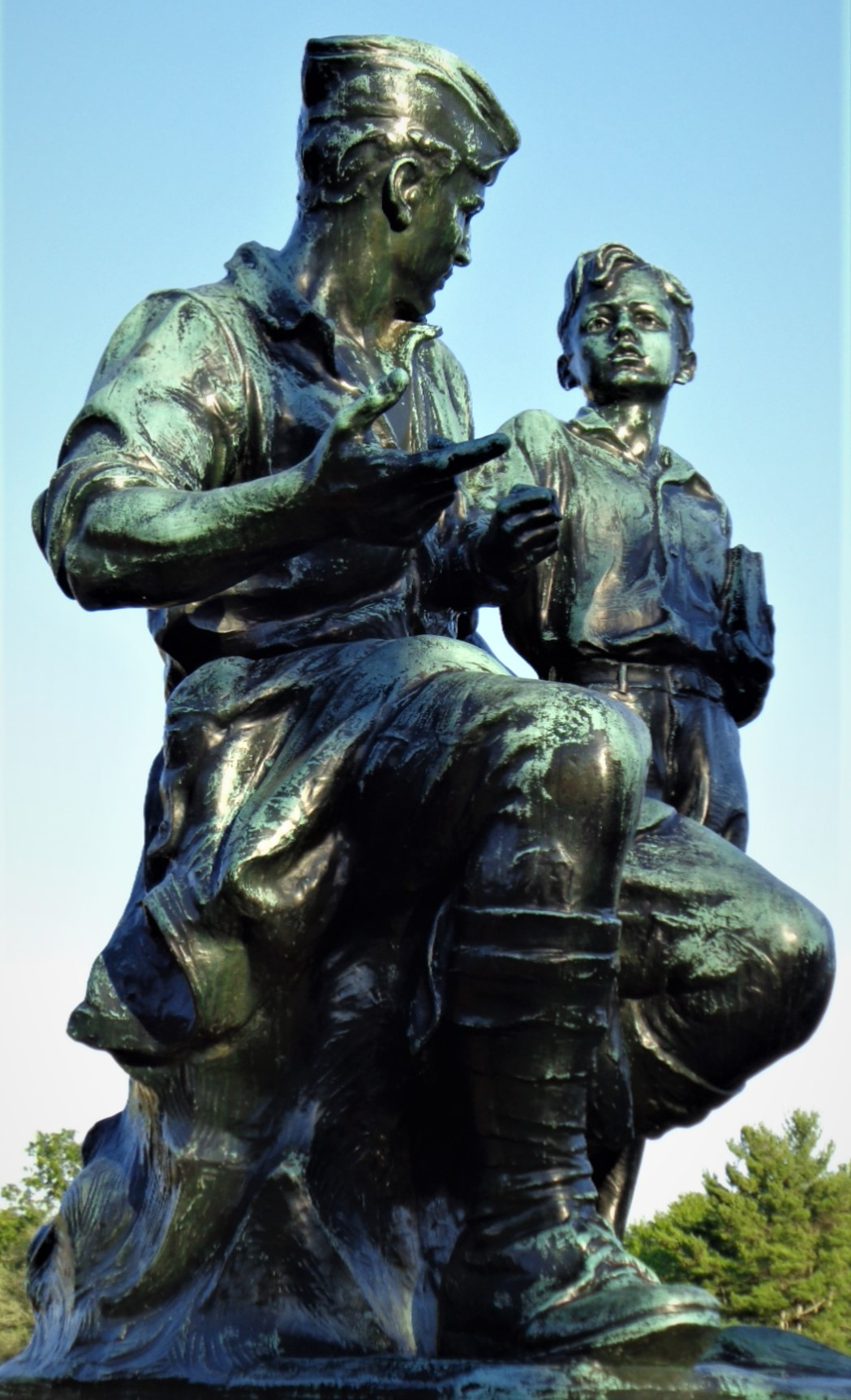

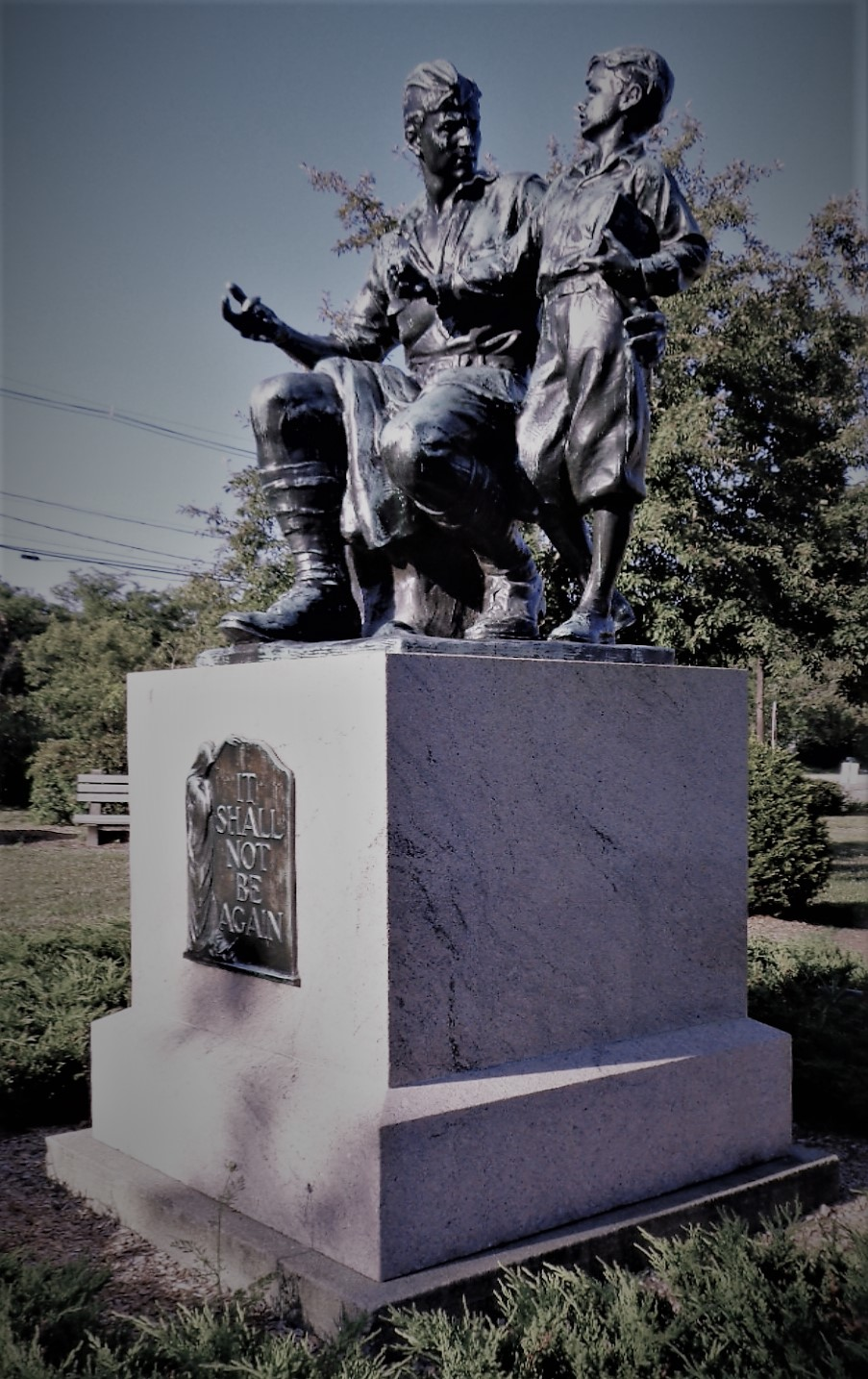

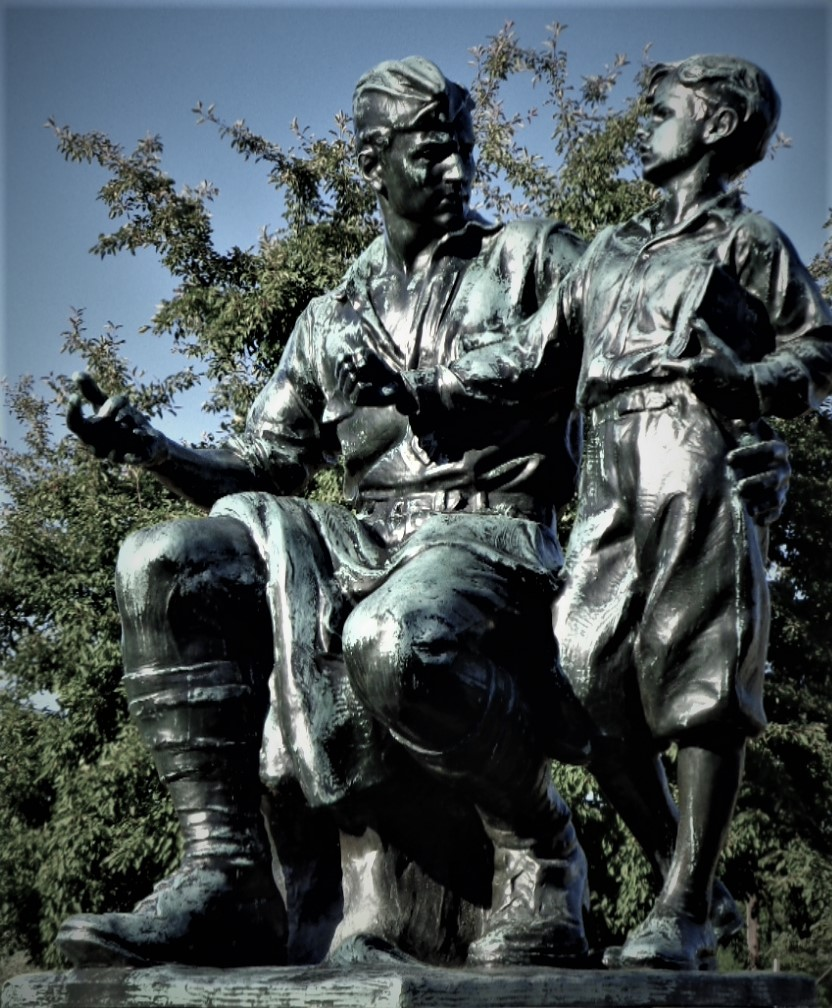

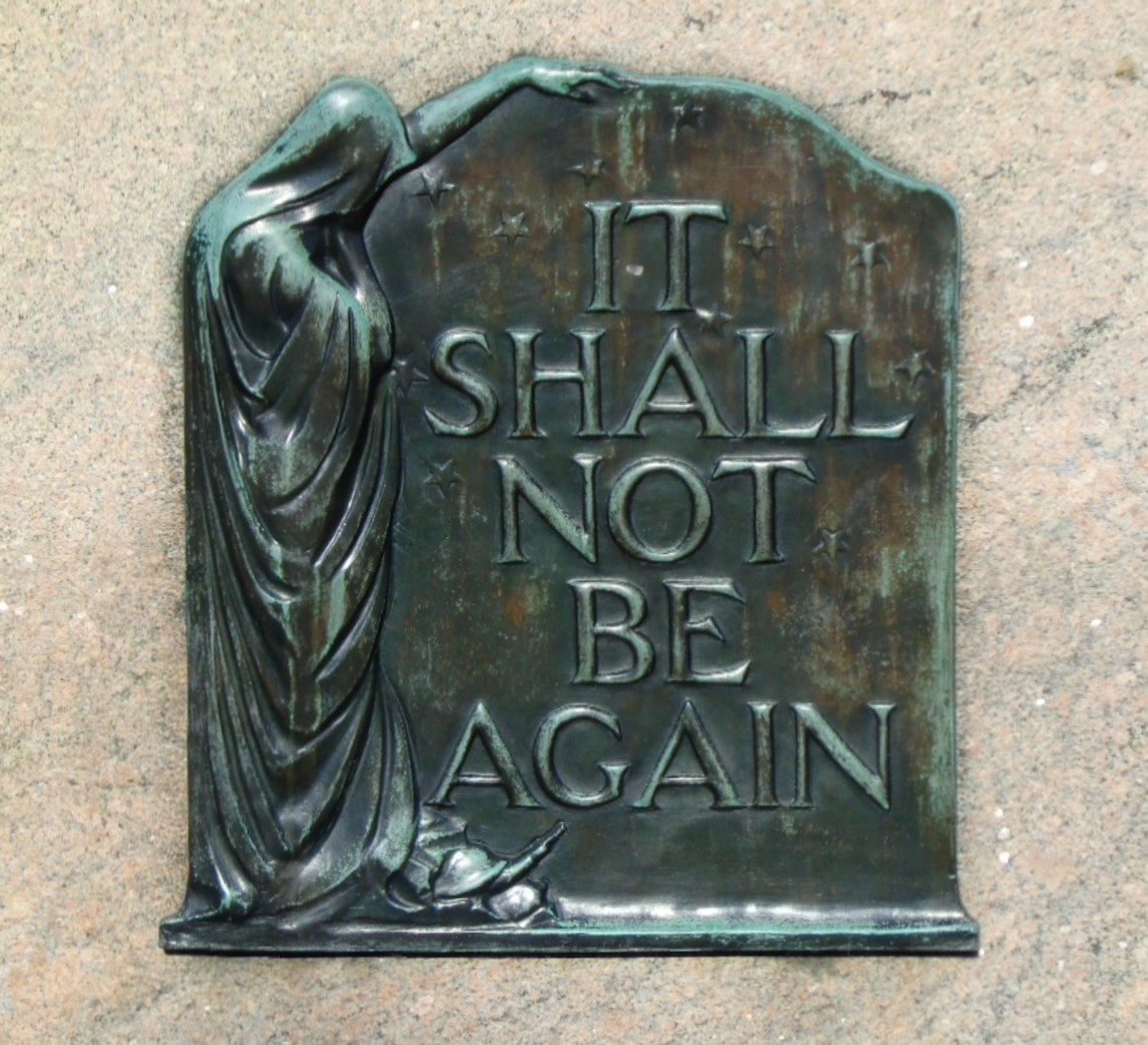

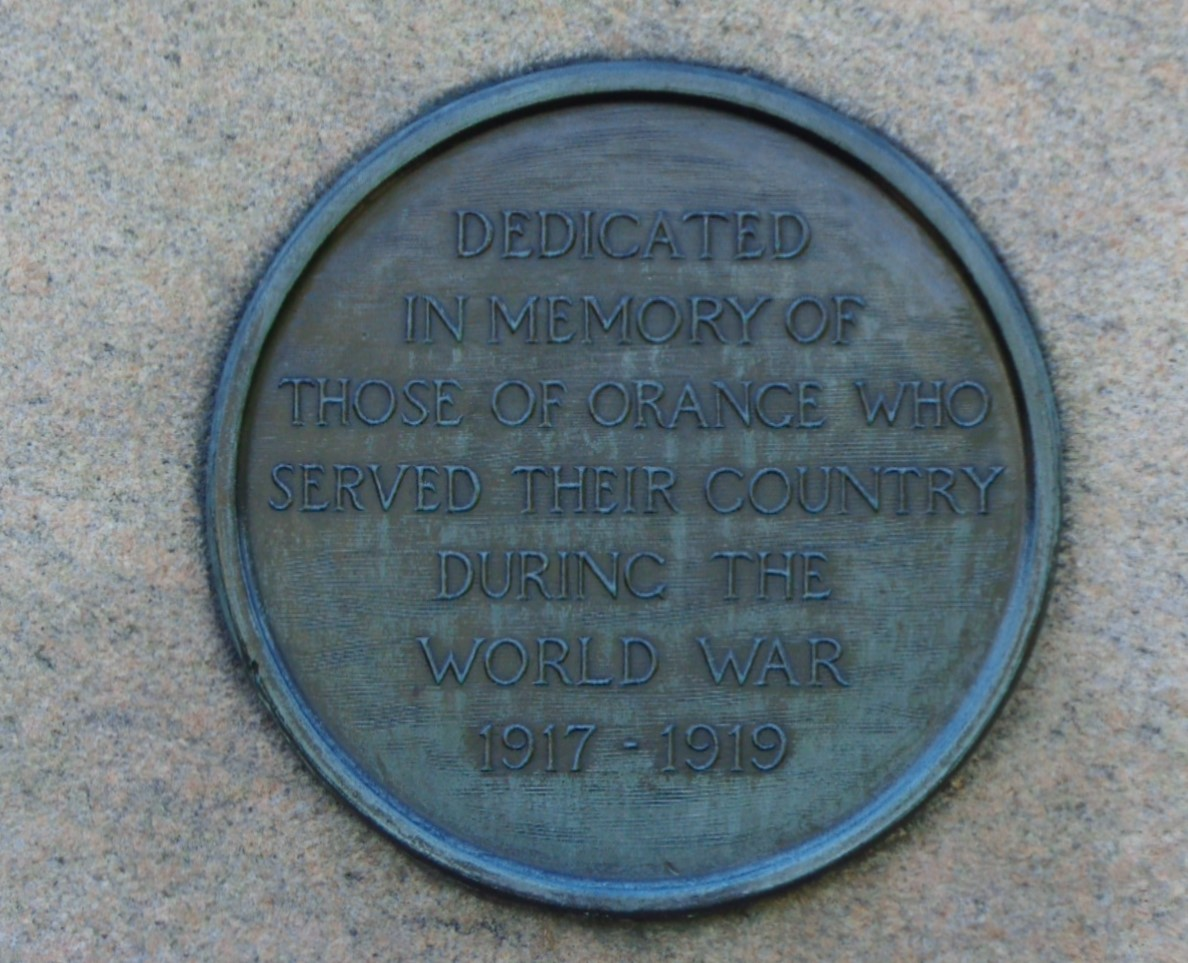
