= Orange Center Historic District (Orange, Massachusetts) =

Historic district in Massachusetts, United States

- U.S. National Register of Historic Places
- U.S. Historic district
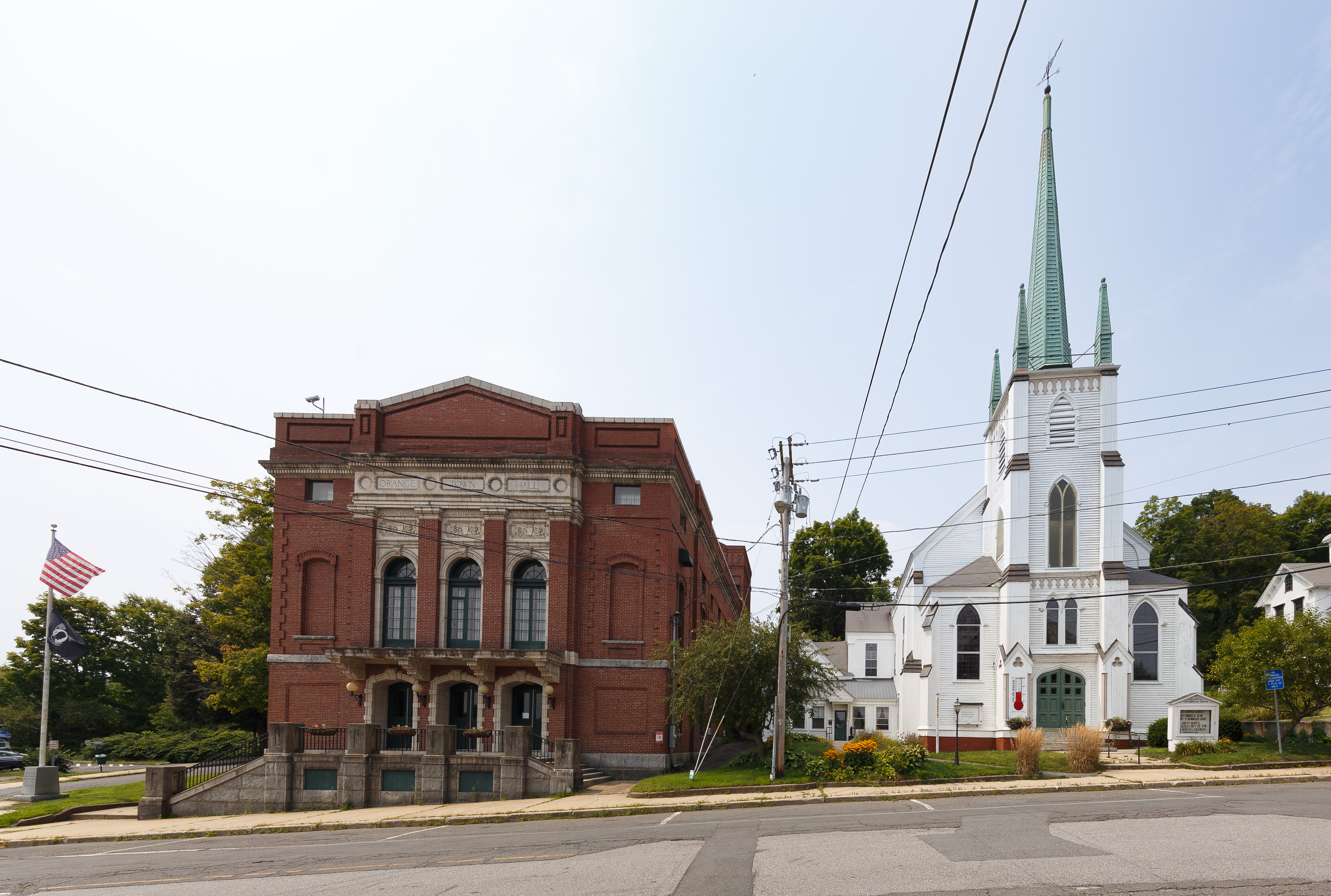
- Town Hall and First Universalist Church

- Location within Massachusetts Location within the United States
- Location: Roughly North and South Main Streets from Prospect Street to River Street; Orange, Massachusetts
- Coordinates: 42°35′26.9″N 72°18′34.8″W
- Area: 12 acres (4.9 ha)
- NRHP reference No.: 89000057
- Added to NRHP: May 27, 1989

Orange Center Historic District is a historic district encompassing the historic civic, commercial, and industrial heart of Orange, Massachusetts in the United States. It was listed on the National Register of Historic Places in 1989.

== Description and history ==
The area that is now the center of Orange was settled around 1785, when a bridge was built across the Millers River, which flows through it in a westerly direction toward the Connecticut River. The town grew in the first half of the 19th century as an industrial area, and its growth increased substantially with the arrival of the railroad in 1846. It became widely known in the second half of the 19th century for the manufacture of sewing machines. The town's economy declined during the Great Depression, and has been at a lower ebb since then.

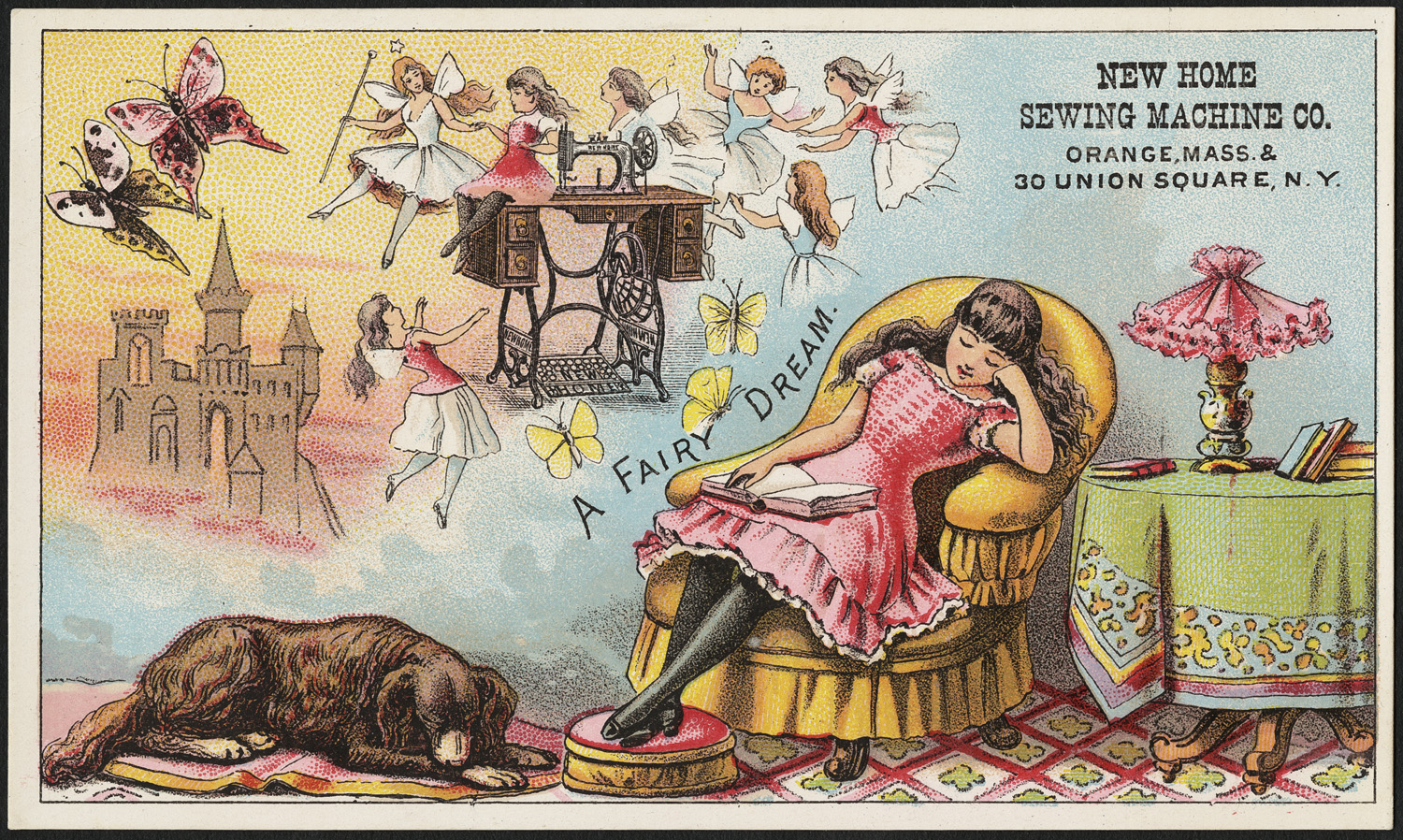
Advertisement for New Home Sewing Machine Co.

The historic district is roughly linear, extending north–south along North and South Main Streets from School Street in the north to River Street on the south side of the Miller River. It extends for a short distance along East and West Main Streets. Included in its roughly 12 acres (4.9 ha) are 37 historically significant buildings, most of which are commercial brick or wood-frame buildings in a variety of styles. Also included are the town hall (built 1868), two churches, railroad-related infrastructure including a surviving freight house. At the northern end of North Main Street are a few period residences, including an ornate Italianate French House that now serves as the home to the local historical society. The Grand Army of the Republic Hall was torn down in the early 1990s.

The district was the site of several industrial companies, including:

- Grout Automobile Company (1900-1912)
- New Home Sewing Machine Company
- Rodney Hunt Company (founded 1840)
- Chase Turbine company
- a modern box factory and a shoe factory (1887)
- Leavitt Machine Company (1890)
- Whitman Grocery Company (1894) which made Tapioca
- two tool plants, (1903 and 1908)

== See also ==
- National Register of Historic Places listings in Franklin County, Massachusetts
- Orange Center Historic District (disambiguation)
