= Orange, Massachusetts =

- Town
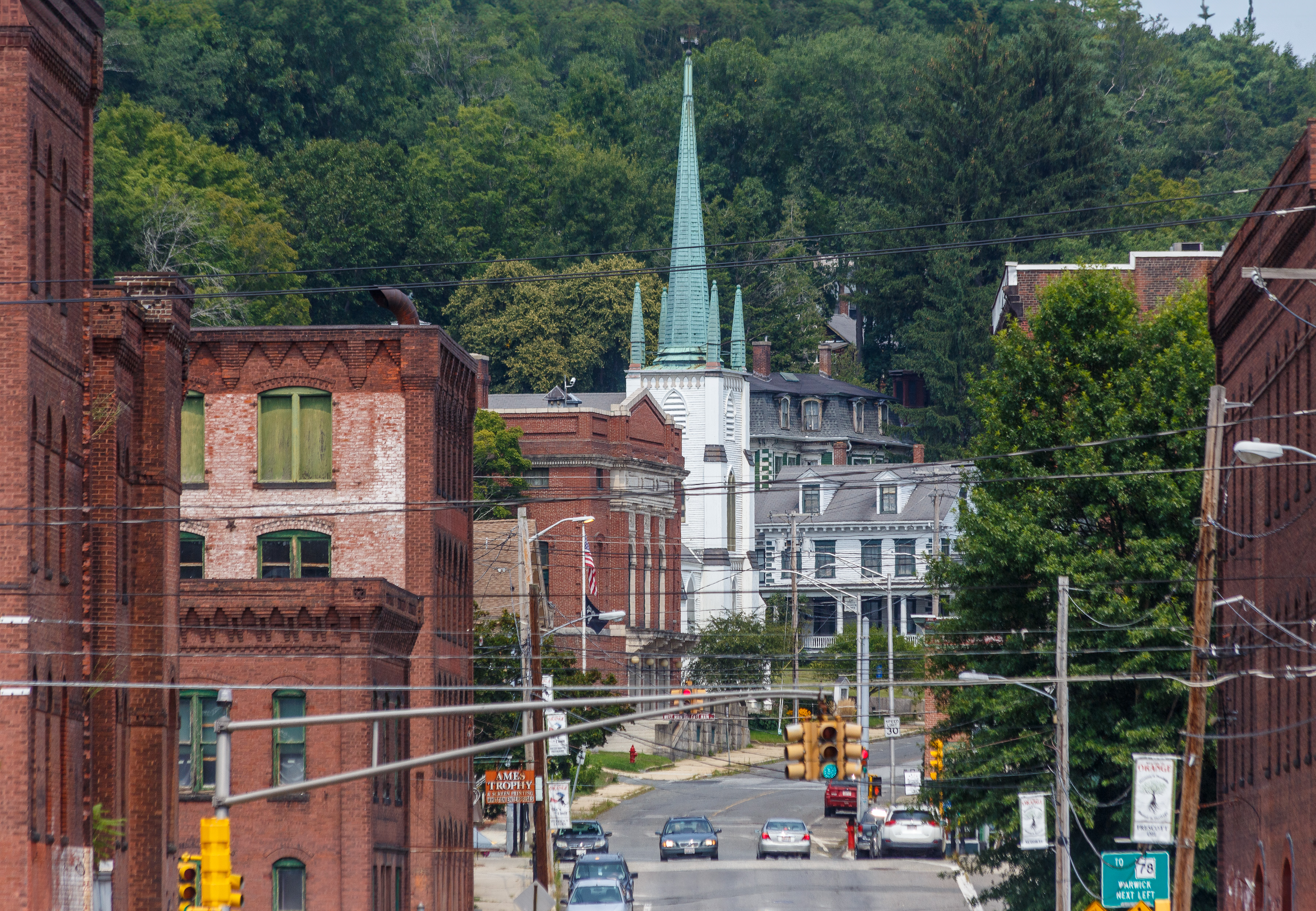
- Looking north from South Main Street

- Seal

- Location in Franklin County in Massachusetts
- Coordinates: 42°35′25″N 72°18′37″W
- Country: United States
- State: Massachusetts
- County: Franklin
- Settled: 1746
- Incorporated: 1810

Government
  - Type: Open town meeting

Area
  - Total: 36.0 sq mi (93.3 km^{2})
  - Land: 35.1 sq mi (90.9 km^{2})
  - Water: 0.93 sq mi (2.4 km^{2})
- Elevation: 732 ft (223 m)

Population (2020)
  - Total: 7,569
  - Density: 216/sq mi (83.3/km^{2})
- Time zone: UTC-5 (Eastern)
  - Summer (DST): UTC-4 (Eastern)
- ZIP code: 01364
- Area code: 351 / 978
- FIPS code: 25-51265
- GNIS feature ID: 0618173
- Website: www.townoforange.org

Orange is a town in Franklin County, Massachusetts, United States. The population was 7,569 at the 2020 census. It is part of the Springfield, Massachusetts Metropolitan Statistical Area.

Part of the town is included in the census-designated place of Orange.

== History ==
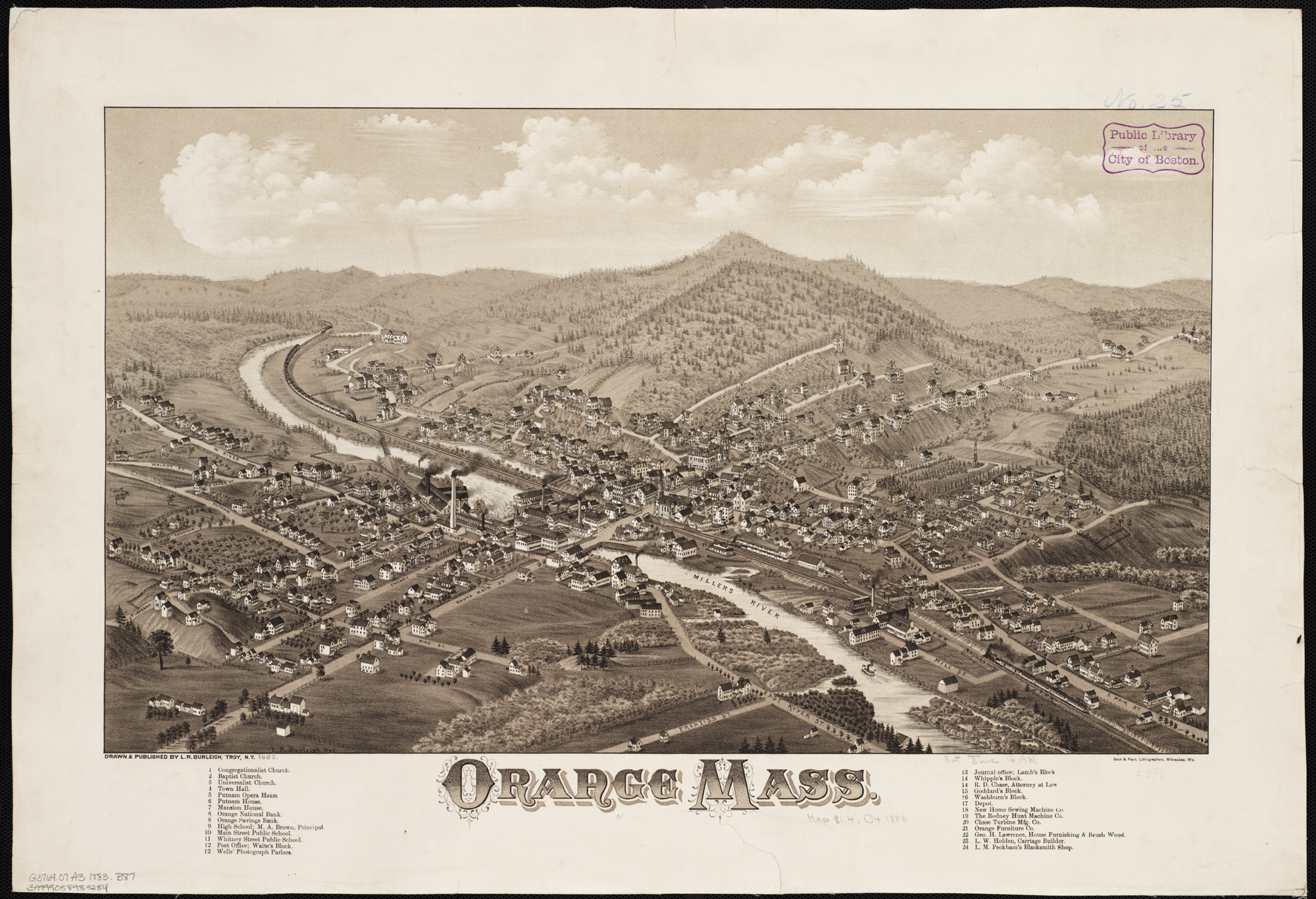
Print of Orange by L.R. Burleigh from 1883 with list of sights

Orange was first settled by Europeans in 1746, created from lands in the towns of Royalston, Warwick and Athol. The lands were not fully settled until the latter parts of the century, becoming the District of Orange in 1783, and finally being incorporated as a town in 1810. It was named for William, Prince of Orange. In 1790, the Millers River was dammed within town, and industry began in the former farming community. Small industry grew, with the town being considered more of a mill town by 1840. By the late nineteenth century the New Home Sewing Machine Company was the largest industry in town, putting out 1.2 million machines at its peak in 1892. In 1900, it was home to the pioneer automobile company Grout, considered the first automobile built in a factory in the United States.

The town was used as the eponymous location for the Hulu Castle Rock series, based on Stephen King's works, with several businesses in the downtown refitted to reflect the milieu.

== Massachusetts Peace Statue ==
The Massachusetts Peace Statue—It Shall Not Be Again—a bronze war memorial statue was erected in Memorial Park in 1934 to recognize veterans who served in World War I. On February 25, 2000, the legislature designated it the official peace statue of the Commonwealth of Massachusetts.

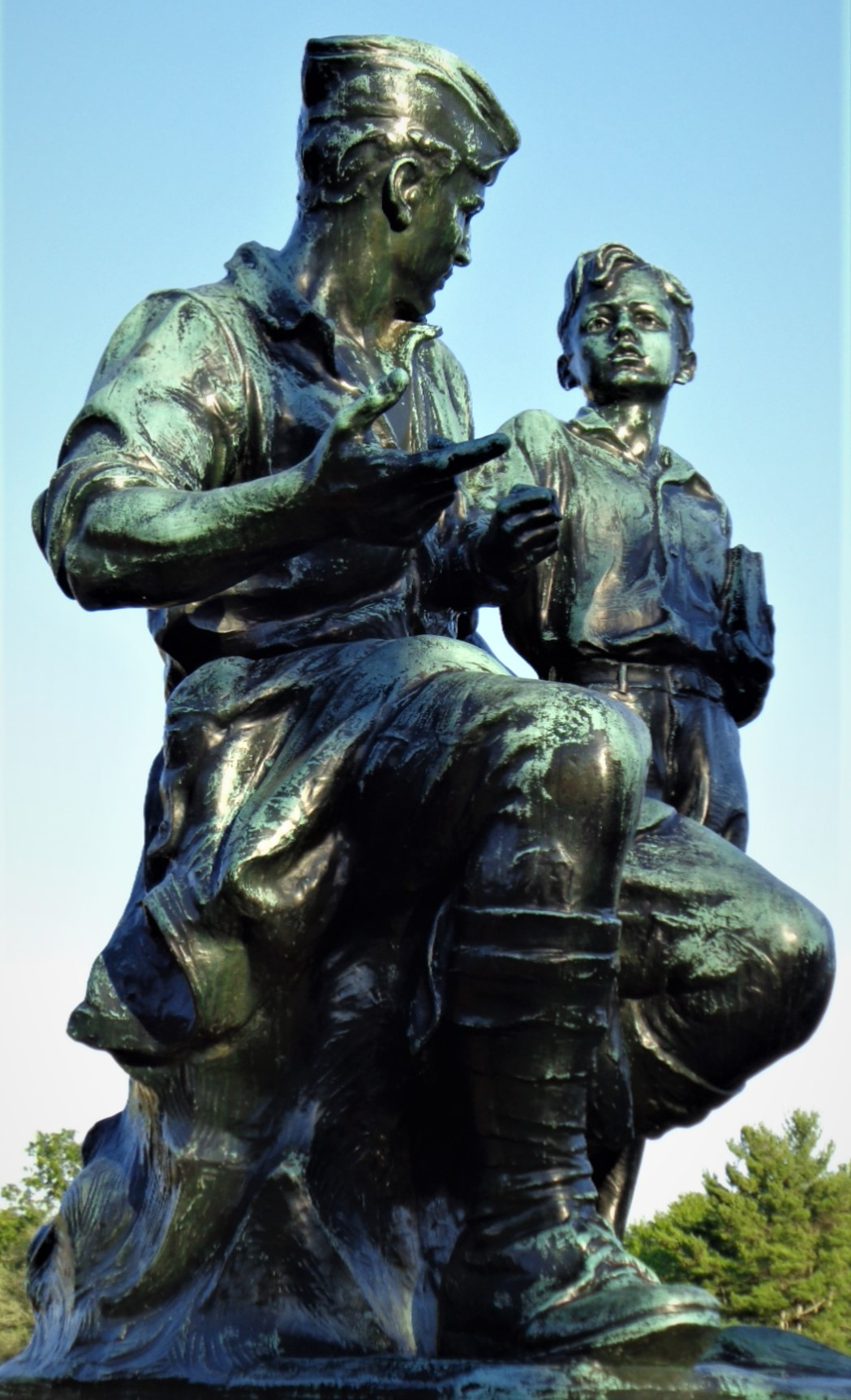
Peace Statue (1934)

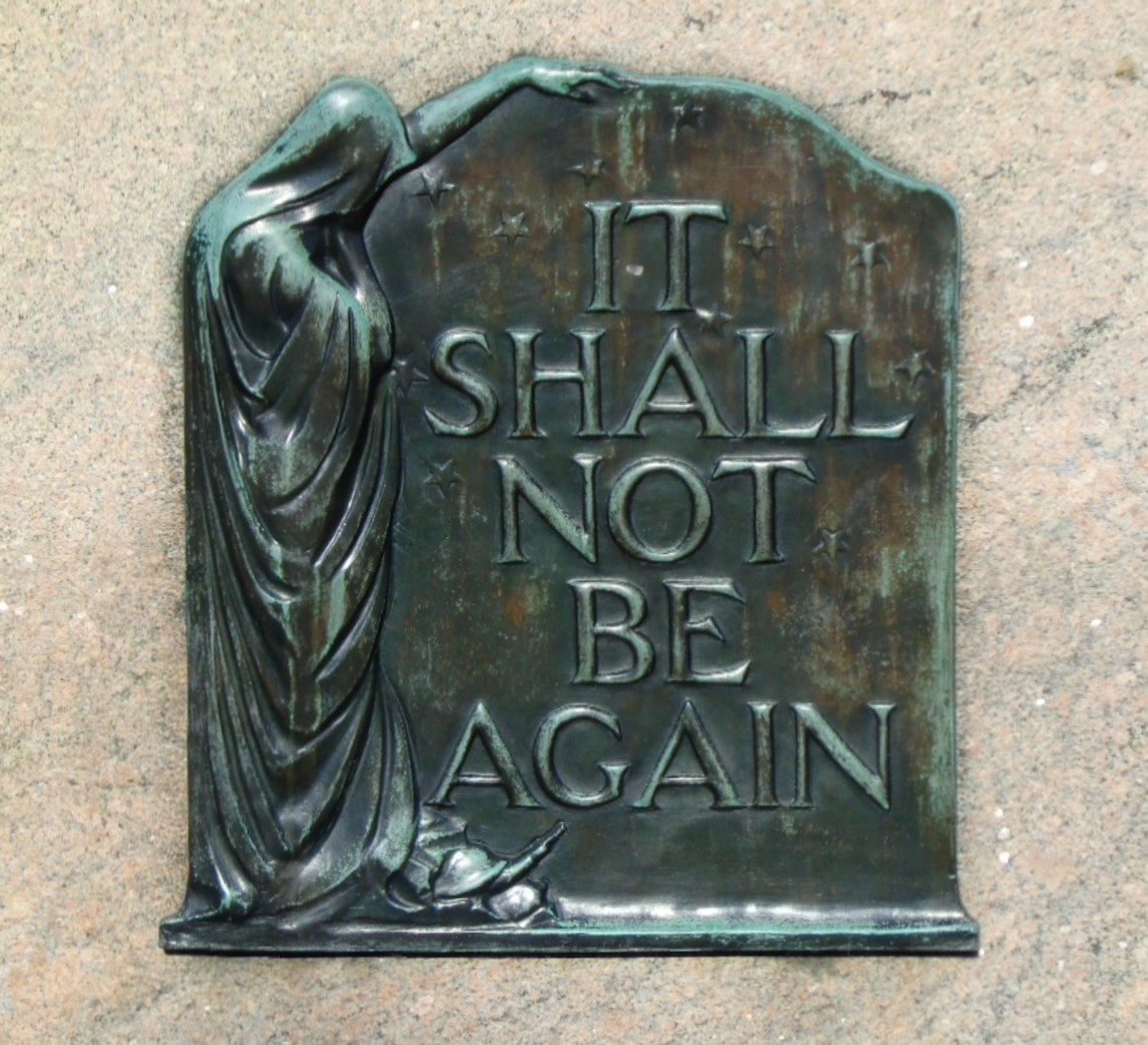
Peace Statue Plaque

== Geography ==
According to the United States Census Bureau, the town has a total area of 36.0 square miles (93.3 km^{2}), of which 35.1 square miles (90.9 km^{2}) is land and 0.93 square miles (2.4 km^{2}), or 2.58%, is water. Orange is drained by the Millers River, which flows through the center of the modern town. There are also several brooks within town, as well as several ponds and lakes, including Tully Pond, Lake Mattawa and part of Lake Rohunta. Only a small portion of the town is protected area, most of which is part of the Orange State Forest, with a small portion being part of the Warwick State Forest. Much of the northern half of town is spotted with swamps, and the town is home to three large hills, Temple Hill and Tully Mountain in the north and Chestnut Hill, the town's highest point, in the south.

Orange is the easternmost town within Franklin County along its border with Worcester County. The town center lies 18 miles (29 km) east of Greenfield, 40 miles (64 km) northwest of Worcester, 42 miles (68 km) northeast of Springfield and 72 miles (116 km) west-northwest of Boston. It is bordered by Royalston to the northeast, Athol to the southeast, New Salem to the south, Wendell to the southwest, a small portion of Erving to the west, and Warwick to the northwest.

=== Climate ===
Like most of Massachusetts, Orange falls into a humid continental climate type, or Koppen Dfa/Dfb. Hot, humid summers are common, along with cold, snowy winters. Spring and fall are typically mild, with notable fall foliage.

Climate data for Orange, Massachusetts (Orange Municipal Airport), 1996–2020 normals, extremes 1996–Present
Month	Jan	Feb	Mar	Apr	May	Jun	Jul	Aug	Sep	Oct	Nov	Dec	Year
Record high °F (°C)	68 (20)	74 (23)	87 (31)	93 (34)	96 (36)	97 (36)	100 (38)	97 (36)	94 (34)	84 (29)	76 (24)	69 (21)	100 (38)
Mean maximum °F (°C)	52.8 (11.6)	54.8 (12.7)	65.4 (18.6)	80.2 (26.8)	88.3 (31.3)	91.7 (33.2)	92.4 (33.6)	90.9 (32.7)	87.2 (30.7)	76.7 (24.8)	66.8 (19.3)	58.5 (14.7)	94.6 (34.8)
Mean daily maximum °F (°C)	32.5 (0.3)	36.0 (2.2)	44.2 (6.8)	57.6 (14.2)	69.2 (20.7)	77.1 (25.1)	82.6 (28.1)	80.8 (27.1)	73.5 (23.1)	60.3 (15.7)	48.6 (9.2)	38.1 (3.4)	58.4 (14.7)
Daily mean °F (°C)	23.7 (−4.6)	26.0 (−3.3)	34.7 (1.5)	46.4 (8.0)	57.9 (14.4)	66.7 (19.3)	72.1 (22.3)	70.3 (21.3)	62.2 (16.8)	50.2 (10.1)	39.5 (4.2)	29.7 (−1.3)	48.3 (9.1)
Mean daily minimum °F (°C)	13.0 (−10.6)	14.8 (−9.6)	23.2 (−4.9)	33.1 (0.6)	44.5 (6.9)	53.9 (12.2)	59.4 (15.2)	57.8 (14.3)	49.8 (9.9)	38.1 (3.4)	28.3 (−2.1)	20.0 (−6.7)	36.3 (2.4)
Mean minimum °F (°C)	−9.5 (−23.1)	−6.0 (−21.1)	3.0 (−16.1)	20.1 (−6.6)	29.0 (−1.7)	39.7 (4.3)	48.6 (9.2)	45.3 (7.4)	34.1 (1.2)	23.2 (−4.9)	12.4 (−10.9)	0.7 (−17.4)	−11.6 (−24.2)
Record low °F (°C)	−24 (−31)	−21 (−29)	−13 (−25)	8 (−13)	25 (−4)	33 (1)	43 (6)	42 (6)	27 (−3)	16 (−9)	1 (−17)	−13 (−25)	−24 (−31)
Average precipitation inches (mm)	2.52 (64)	2.74 (70)	3.24 (82)	3.34 (85)	3.35 (85)	4.47 (114)	3.62 (92)	3.78 (96)	4.28 (109)	4.57 (116)	3.10 (79)	3.52 (89)	42.53 (1,081)
Average precipitation days (≥ 0.01 in)	10.9	10.1	11.0	12.7	13.5	13.5	12.3	13.4	13.0	12.8	10.8	11.5	145.5
Source: NOAA

== Transportation ==
The town lies along Massachusetts Route 2, the major east-west route across the northern part of the state. Except for the westernmost tenth of a mile, the entire road is a limited access highway through town. The highway portion ends at the junction of Route 2A, which passes just north of the Millers River near the town center, heading east into Athol and following Route 2's former right of way. Orange is also home to the southern terminus of Route 78 and the northern terminus of Route 122. Additionally, the western end of the concurrency between Route 2 and U.S. Route 202 is just within town.

The Springfield Terminal railway passes through town, crossing the Millers River several times in the western side of town. The Fitchburg Railroad and later Boston and Maine once provided passenger rail service to Orange; however, these trains have long ceased operating and today only freight passes through the town.

Two local bus routes, the Orange/Greenfield Route of the Franklin Regional Transit Authority, and the Gardner/Orange Route of Montachusett Regional Transit Authority, provide service along Route 2A.

The Town of Orange owns and operates Orange Municipal Airport (ICAO: KORE, FAA LID: ORE), a small air service airstrip which also serves as a flight training center and parachuting center. The nearest national air service can be reached either at Bradley International Airport to the south or Manchester-Boston Regional Airport to the northeast.

== Education ==
Elementary School:

- Fisher Hill School (Pre-K through 6)

High School:

- Ralph C. Mahar Regional High School (7–12)

== Demographics ==
Historical population
Year	Pop.	±%
1790	784	—
1840	1,492	+90.3%
1850	1,701	+14.0%
1860	1,622	−4.6%
1870	2,091	+28.9%
1880	3,169	+51.6%
1890	4,568	+44.1%
1900	5,520	+20.8%
1910	5,282	−4.3%
1920	5,393	+2.1%
1930	5,365	−0.5%
1940	5,611	+4.6%
1950	5,894	+5.0%
1960	6,154	+4.4%
1970	6,104	−0.8%
1980	6,844	+12.1%
1990	7,312	+6.8%
2000	7,518	+2.8%
2010	7,839	+4.3%
2020	7,569	−3.4%
2022	7,558	−0.1%
Source: United States census records and Population Estimates Program data.

As of the census of 2000, there were 7,518 people, 3,045 households, and 1,979 families residing in the town. The population density was 212.6 inhabitants per square mile (82.1/km^{2}). There were 3,303 housing units at an average density of 93.4 per square mile (36.1/km^{2}). The racial makeup of the town was 96.29% White, 1.06% Black or African American, 0.23% Native American, 0.48% Asian, 0.01% Pacific Islander, 0.59% from other races, and 1.34% from two or more races. Hispanic or Latino of any race were 1.65% of the population.

There were 3,045 households, out of which 31.9% had children under the age of 18 living with them, 47.6% were married couples living together, 12.8% had a female householder with no husband present, and 35.0% were non-families. 28.7% of all households were made up of individuals, and 13.6% had someone living alone who was 65 years of age or older. The average household size was 2.46 and the average family size was 3.02.

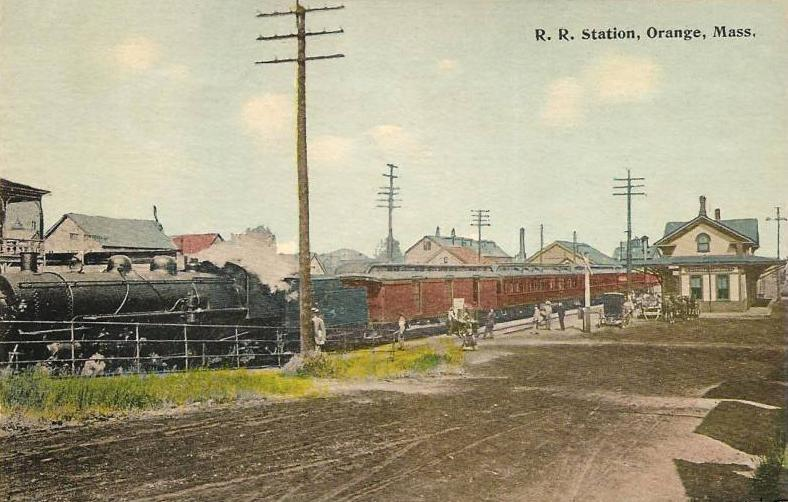
Railroad station c. 1912

In the town, the population was spread out, with 26.7% under the age of 18, 7.2% from 18 to 24, 28.3% from 25 to 44, 23.4% from 45 to 64, and 14.4% who were 65 years of age or older. The median age was 38 years. For every 100 females, there were 92.8 males. For every 100 females age 18 and over, there were 87.7 males.

The median income for a household in the town was $36,849, and the median income for a family was $44,128. Males had a median income of $34,367 versus $23,967 for females. The per capita income for the town was $17,361. About 5.8% of families and 7.8% of the population were below the poverty line, including 7.4% of those under age 18 and 10.5% of those age 65 or over.

== Events ==
- North Quabbin Garlic and Arts Festival
- Annual Athol to Orange River Rat Race

== Notable people ==
- Myrtle Bachelder, chemist and Women's Army Corps officer who worked on the Manhattan Project
- Charles Chapin, U.S. Marshal for Vermont
- Robert Dexter Conrad, naval captain
- Walter William Spencer Cook (1888–1962), art historian and professor, specialized in Spanish Medieval art history; born in Orange
- Genevieve Gaignard, artist
- Whitey Witt, former Baseball player and member of the New York Yankees first World Series championship team 1923

== Gallery ==
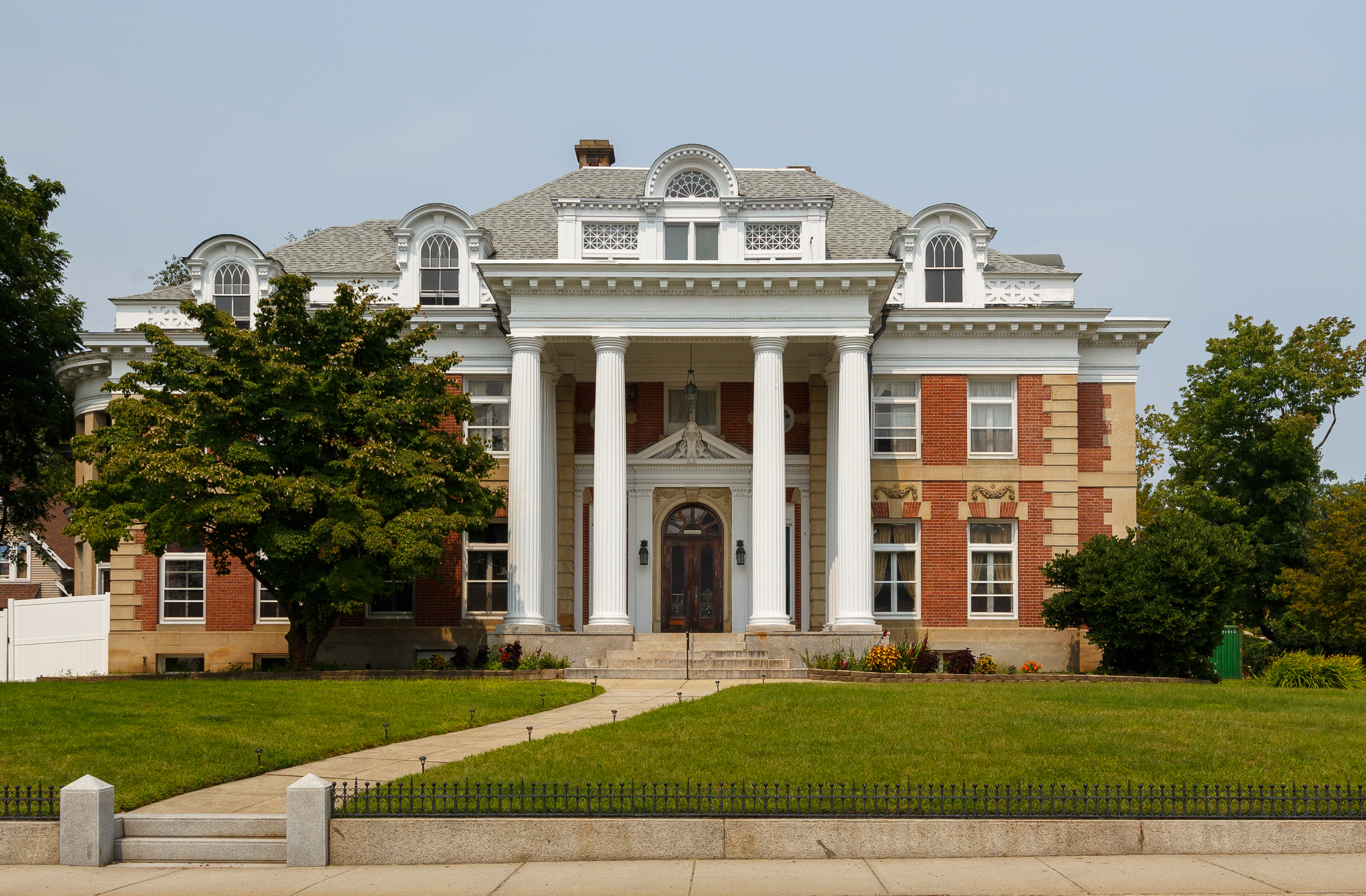
Wheeler Mansion

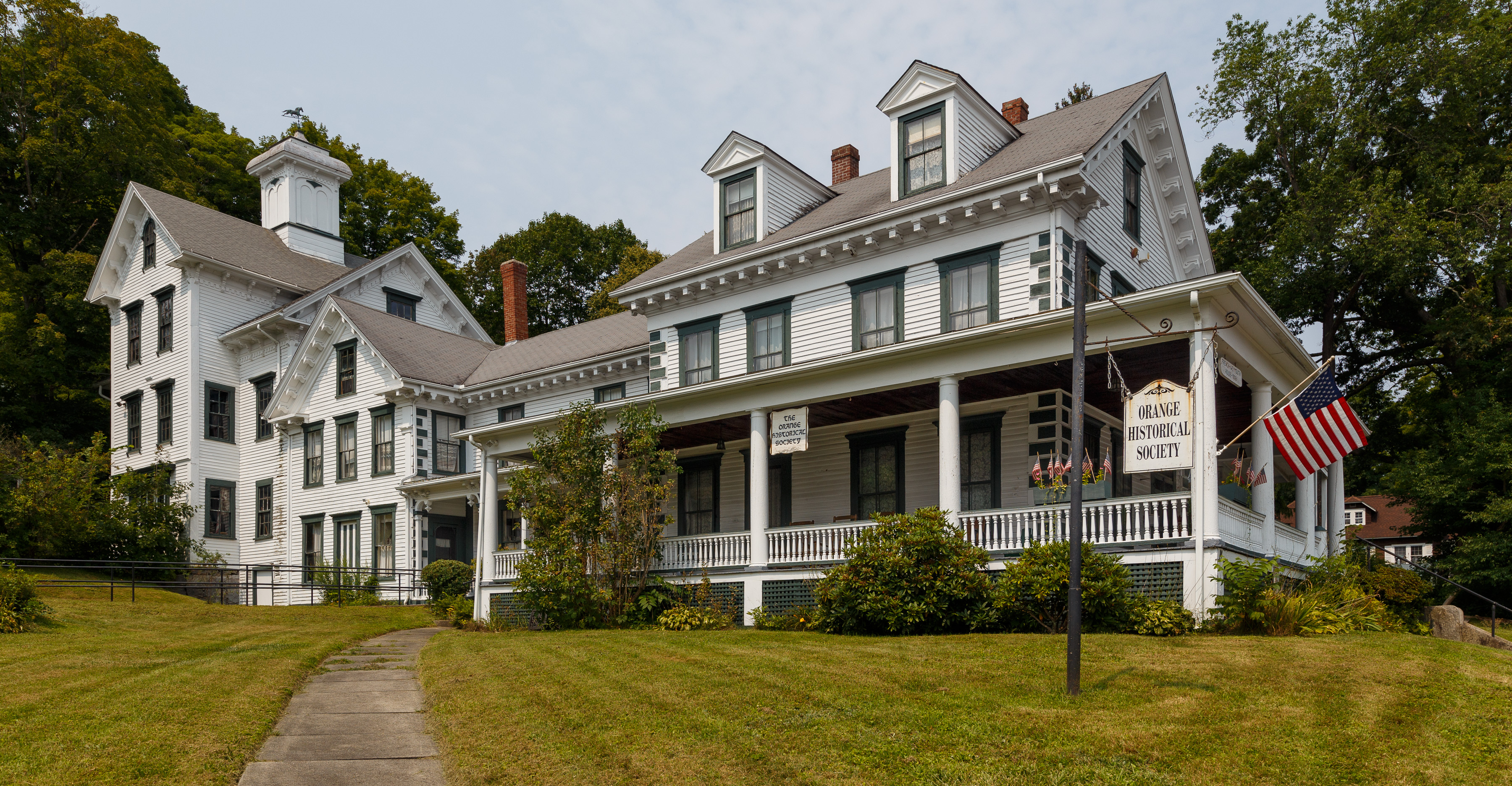
Orange Historical Society

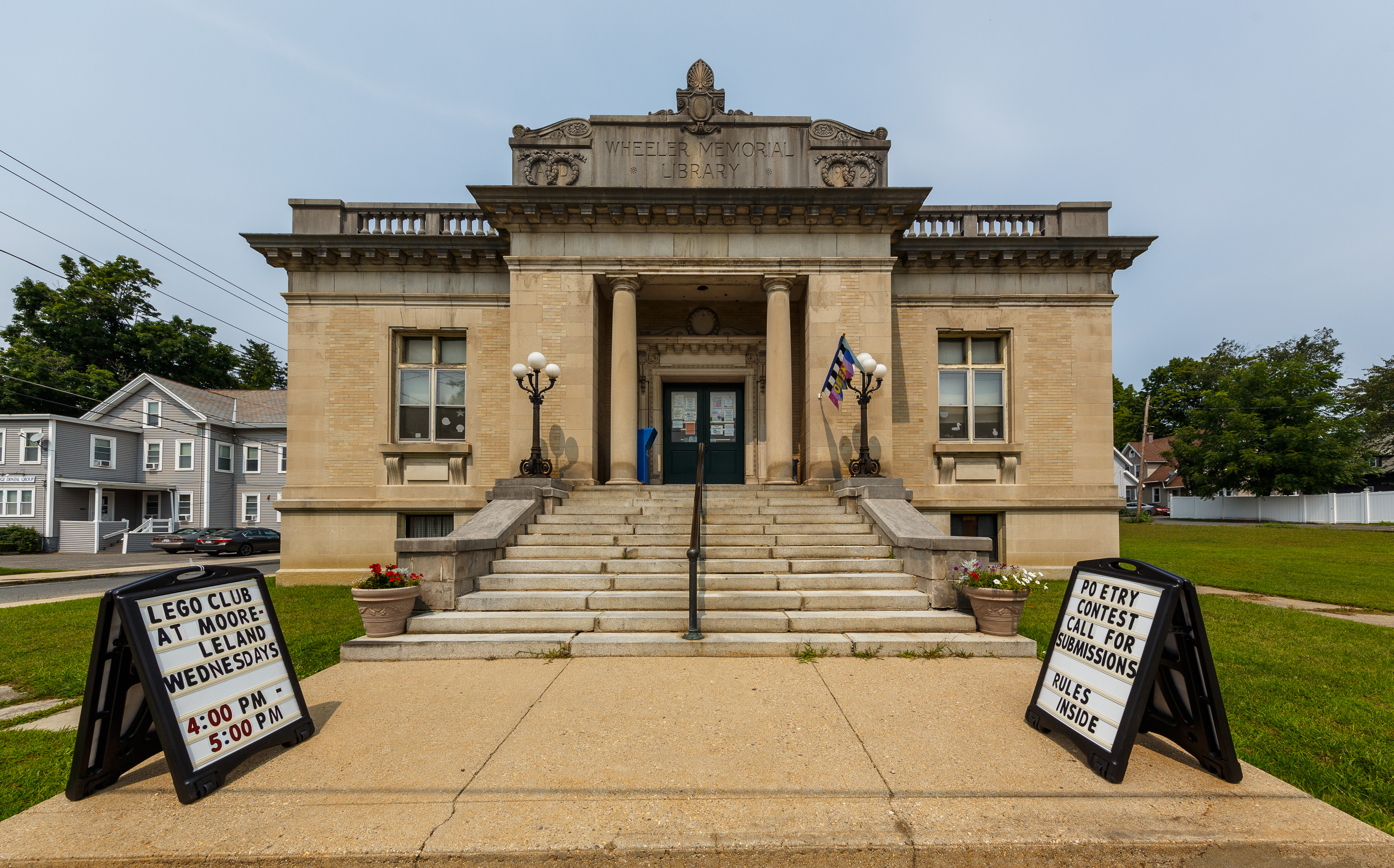
Wheeler Memorial Library

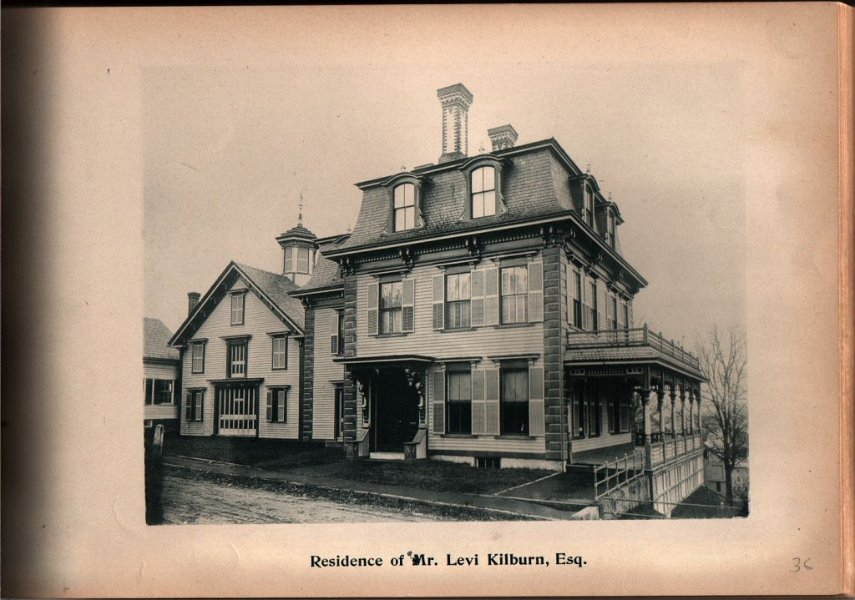
Estate of Levi Kilburn

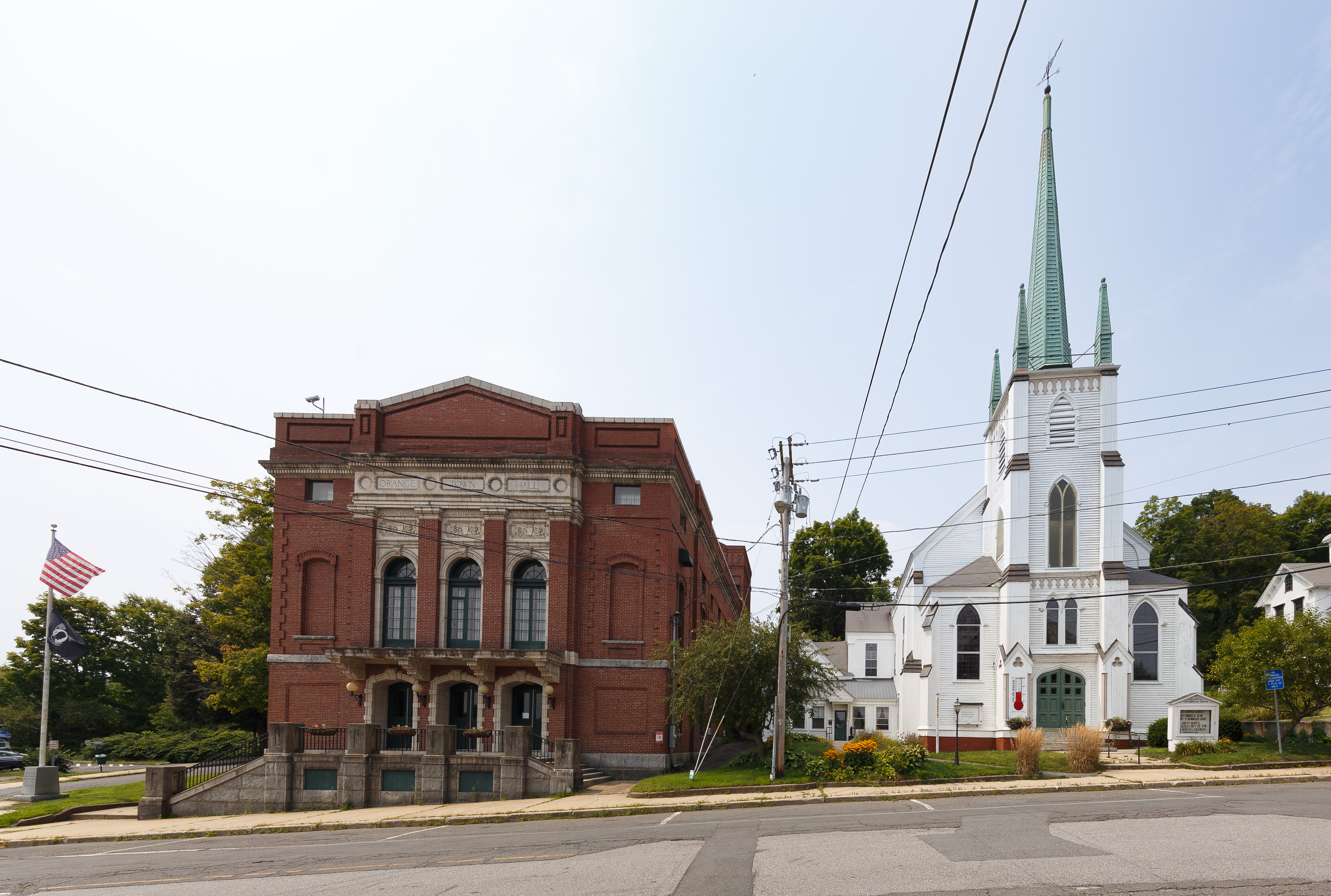
Orange Town Hall and Universalist Church

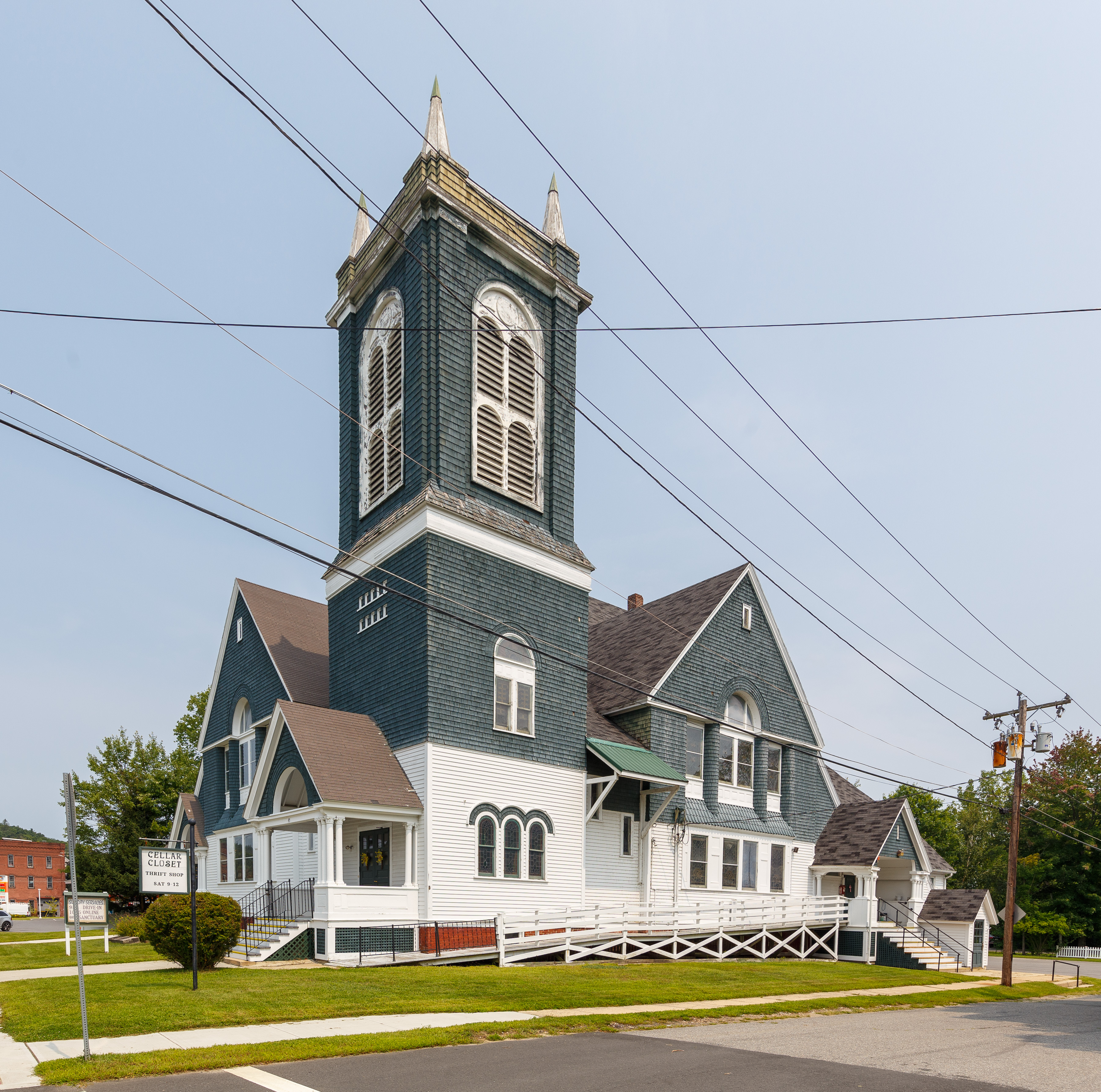
Central Congregational Church

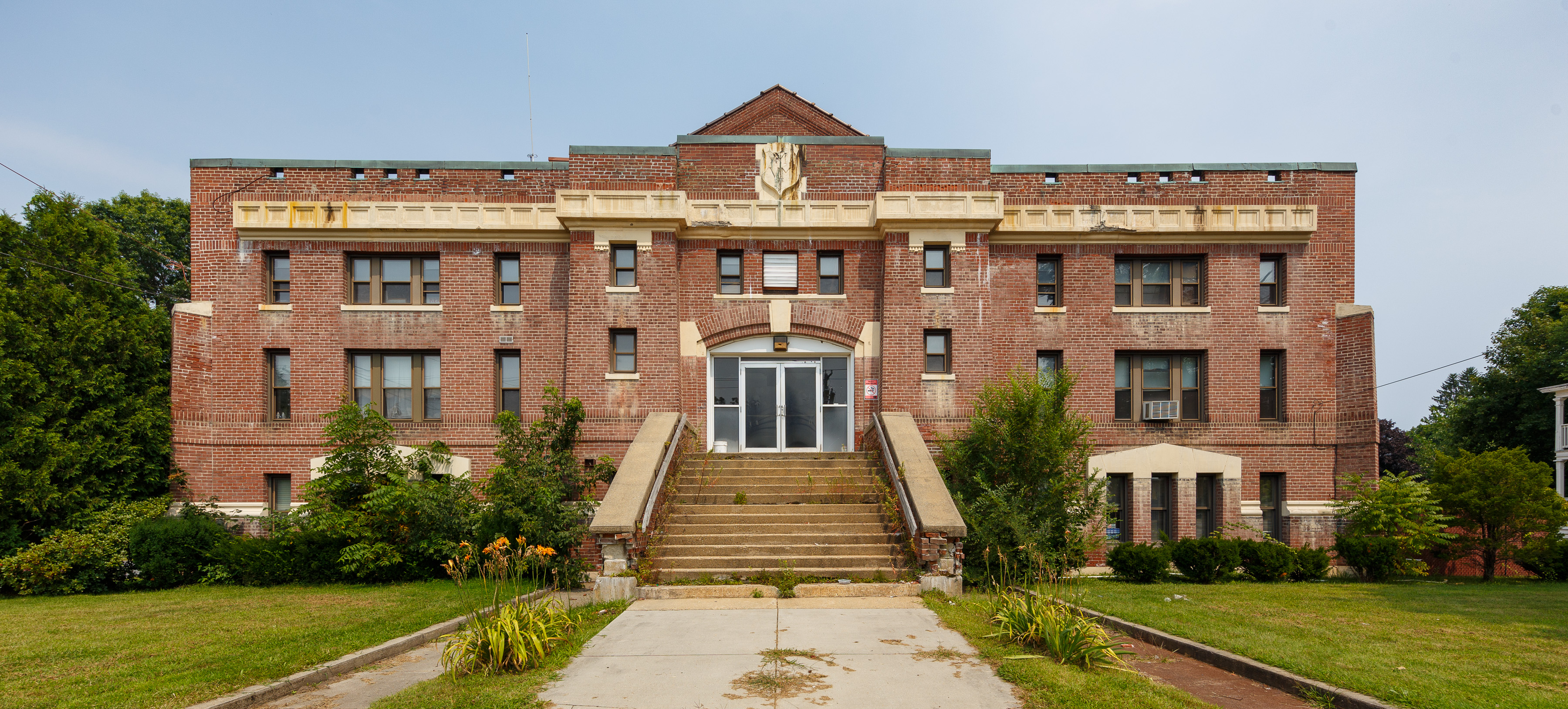
Orange Armory

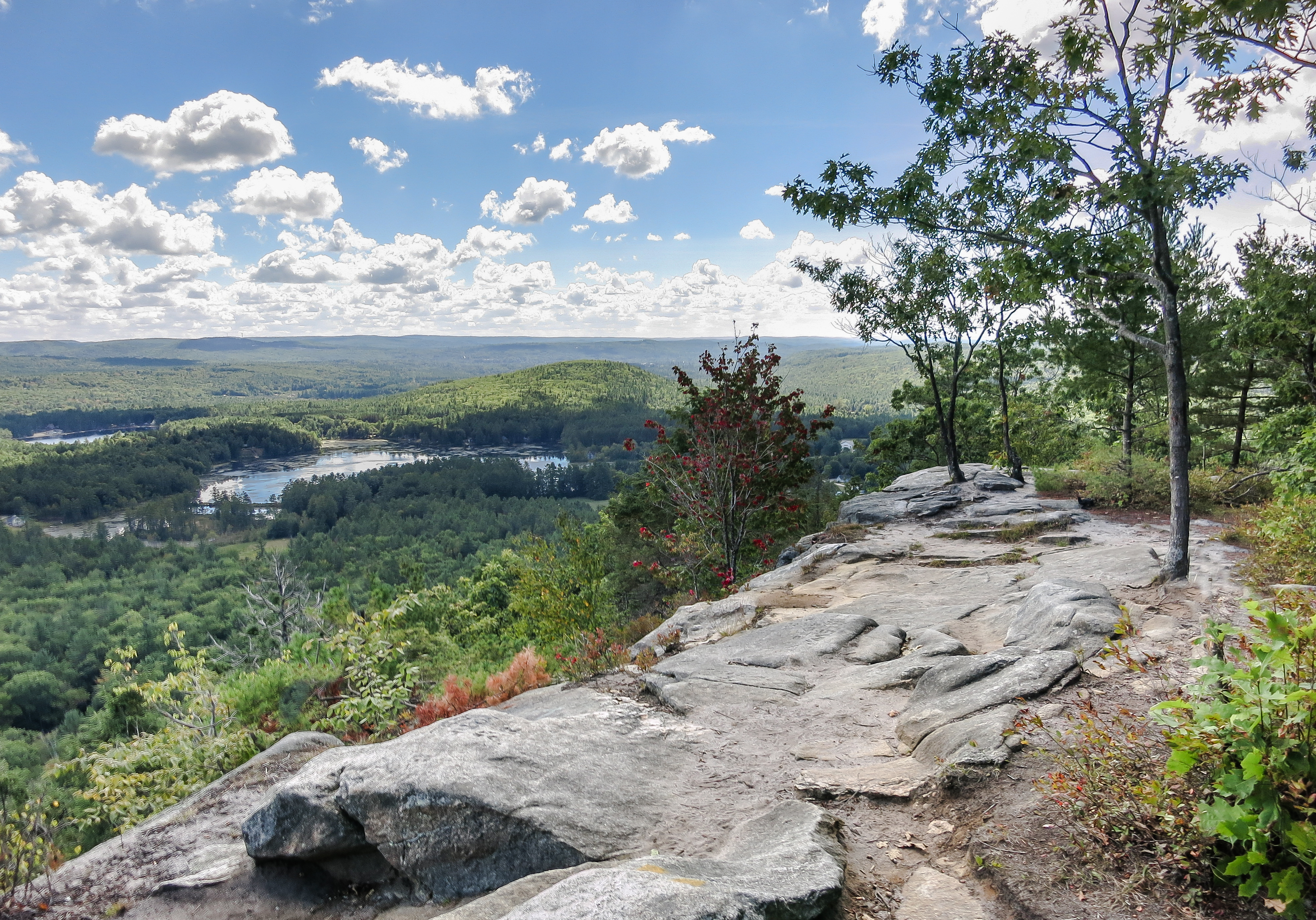
Tully Mountain Outlook

== See also ==
- Orange Center Historic District (Orange, Massachusetts)
- Grand Army of the Republic Hall (Orange, Massachusetts)
- Ralph C. Mahar Regional High School
- List of mill towns in Massachusetts
