= Amherst Central Business District =

Historic district in Massachusetts, United States

- U.S. National Register of Historic Places
- U.S. Historic district
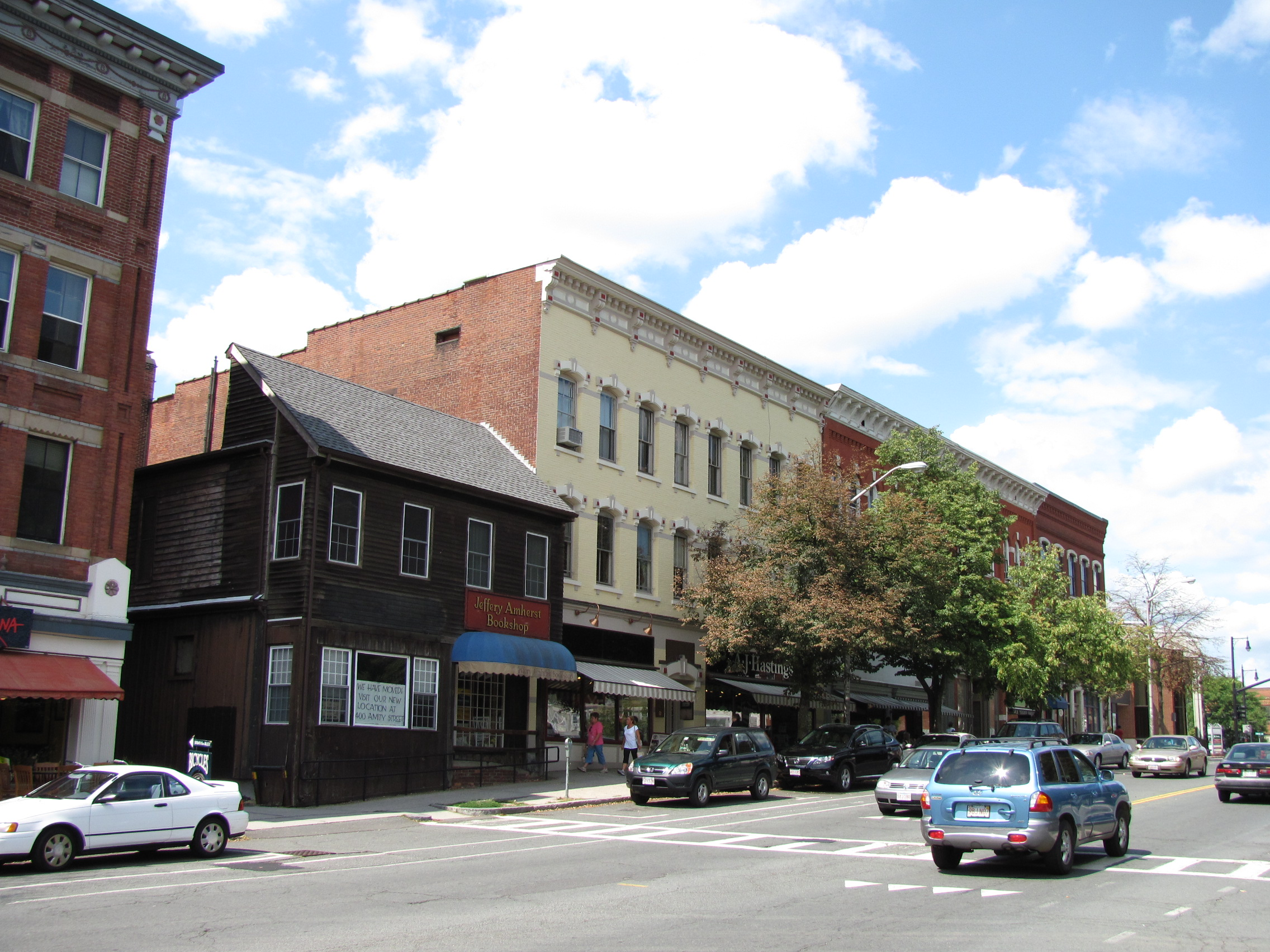
- South Pleasant Street

- Location within Massachusetts Location within the United States
- Location: 1-79 Main St., 13-31 N. Pleasant St., 1-79 S. Pleasant St., 1-18,30 Boltwood Ave., Amherst, Massachusetts
- Coordinates: 42°22′38″N 72°31′13″W
- Area: 9 acres (3.6 ha)
- Built: 1774
- Architect: Multiple
- Architectural style: Colonial Revival, Other, Federal
- NRHP reference No.: 91001859 (original); 11000585 (increase)

Significant dates
- Added to NRHP: December 27, 1991
- Boundary increase: August 24, 2011

The Amherst Central Business District is a historic district encompassing the heart of downtown Amherst, Massachusetts. Centered on the northern section of the long town common, the area has been the civic and commercial heart of the town since the 18th century. The district was listed on the National Register of Historic Places in 1991, and slightly enlarged in 2011.

== Description and history ==
Amherst was originally part of Hadley, settled in 1661, and was itself known to have colonial settlements by 1728. It was incorporated in 1768. Its earliest focal point of settlement was in what is now its commercial business district, at the junction of Main and Pleasant Streets. No buildings surviving from this early date; the oldest house in the area is the Strong House, built in 1774 by Simeon Strong. Only a few buildings predate 1838, when a major fire devastated the downtown area. As a consequence of that and later fires, the character of the commercial buildings in the district is largely that of the late 19th and early 20th centuries. Initially an agricultural area, Amherst flourished with the rise of both Amherst College and the Massachusetts Agricultural College (now UMass Amherst) as major institutions.

When first listed on the National Register of Historic Places in 1991, it consisted of a group of mostly brick commercial buildings, built between 1836 and 1930, centered on the junction of South Pleasant, North Pleasant, Amity, and Main Streets, and Boltwood Avenue. The notable non-commercial buildings in the district include the Strong House (separately listed in 1984), the Grace Episcopal Church, the First Baptist Church, and Amherst Town Hall. The district includes the northernmost third of the town common, including a fountain. The district was enlarged in 2011 to include the Lord Jeffery Inn at 30 Boltwood Avenue.

== See also ==
- Dickinson Historic District, just outside downtown
- East Village Historic District (Amherst, Massachusetts)
- Cushman Village Historic District
- North Amherst Center Historic District
- South Amherst Common Historic District
- National Register of Historic Places listings in Hampshire County, Massachusetts
