= Center Cemetery (Southampton, Massachusetts) =

Historic cemetery in Massachusetts, United States

- U.S. National Register of Historic Places
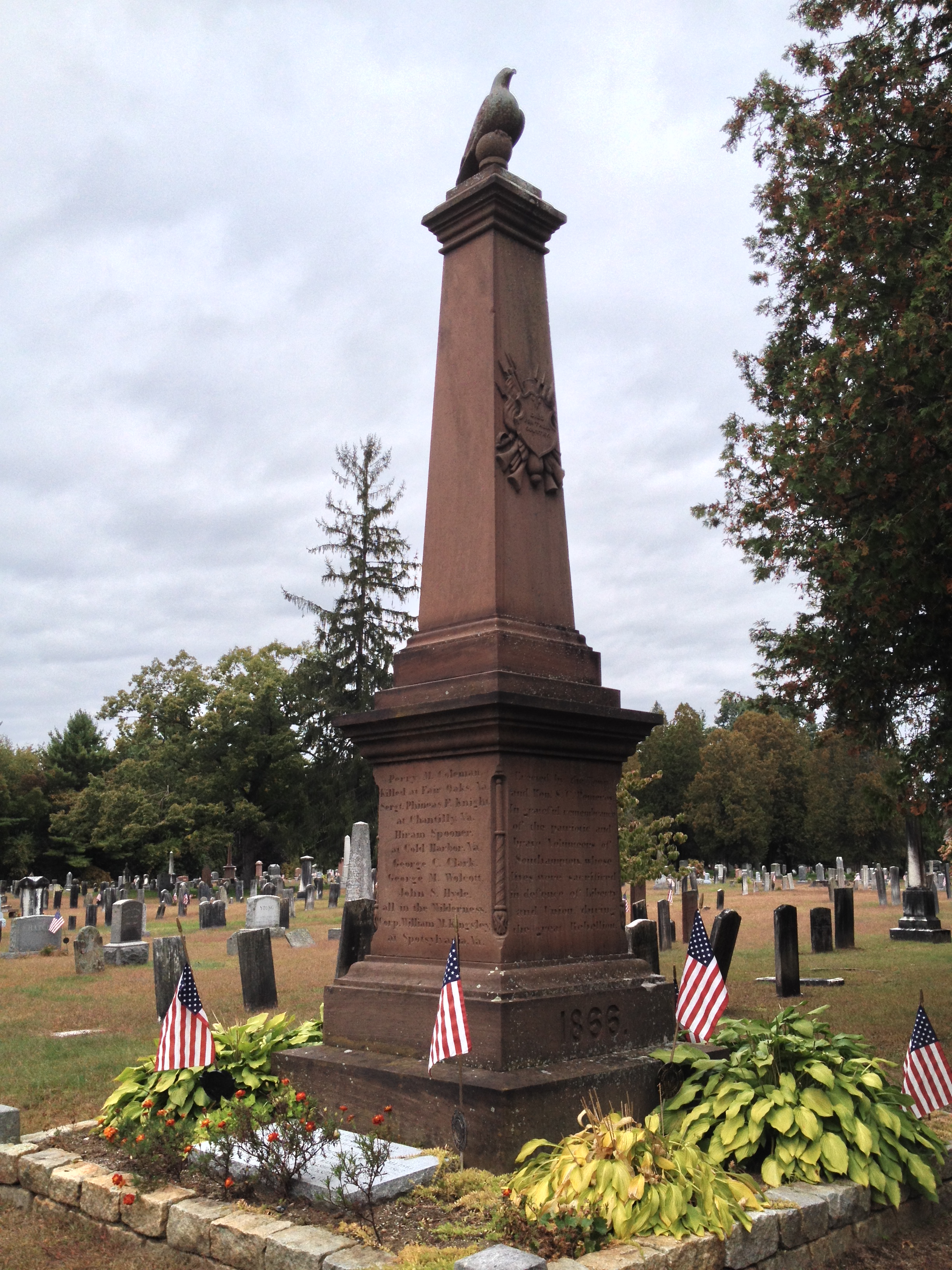
- Soldiers' Monument at the cemetery entrance

- Location within Massachusetts Location within the United States
- Location: MA 10, Southampton, Massachusetts
- Coordinates: 42°14′6″N 72°43′37″W
- Area: 6.5 acres (2.6 ha)
- Built: 1774
- NRHP reference No.: 13000170
- Added to NRHP: April 16, 2013

Center Cemetery is a historic cemetery in Southampton, Massachusetts. The 6.5-acre (2.6 ha) cemetery is located on the west side of Massachusetts Route 10, about 0.25 miles (0.40 km) north of Southampton Center. It was the town's first cemetery, with the oldest marker dating 1738. It remains its principal burying ground, providing resting places for the town's early settlers and later civic and business leaders. It was listed on the National Register of Historic Places in 2013.

== Description and history ==
Southampton's Center Cemetery is located in central Southampton, with the historic town center to its south and a modern commercial district to its north. It is set on a roughly rectangular parcel 6.5 acres (2.6 ha) in size on the west side of Massachusetts Route 10. It is organizationally divided into twelve sections, with areas 2 through 4 constituting its oldest sections. Ten of these sections are laid out in strips perpendicular to the road, with gravel paths between them. The older sections are unusual in that early graves were placed somewhat haphazardly in family plots, which were infilled with later burials in the 19th century as a space economization measure.

The cemetery's exact date of founding is not recorded, with its first appearance on a map in 1750, and its oldest grave marked 1738. The town apparently began management of it in 1754, a point at which may have been enlarged. The grounds underwent several expansions to reach their present size, and further growth is contemplated. In the 1830s a receiving vault was added, and an iron fence was installed around three sides of the perimeter in 1900. The Soldiers' Monument, a red sandstone obelisk which stands prominently at the cemetery entrance, was placed in 1866.

== See also ==
- National Register of Historic Places listings in Hampshire County, Massachusetts
