= Pomeroy Terrace Historic District =

Historic district in Massachusetts, United States

- U.S. National Register of Historic Places
- U.S. Historic district
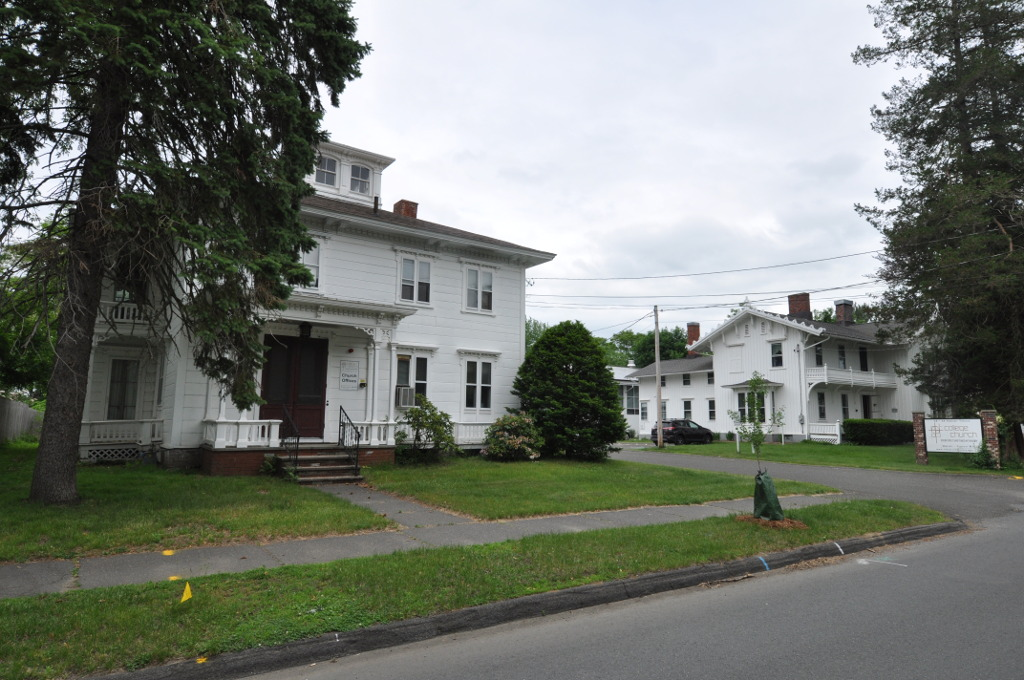
- College Church buildings on Pomeroy Terrace

- Location within Massachusetts Location within the United States
- Location: Pomeroy Terr., Phillips & Butler Pls., Bixby Ct., Hawley, Hancock, & Bridge Sts., Northampton, Massachusetts
- Coordinates: 42°19′20″N 72°37′35″W
- Area: 32 acres (13 ha)
- Architect: William Fenno Pratt
- Architectural style: Federal
- NRHP reference No.: 100002420
- Added to NRHP: May 11, 2018

The Pomeroy Terrace Historic District is a historic district on the east side of downtown Northampton, Massachusetts. Located south of Bridge Street east of the main railroad right-of-way, it was one of the city's most desirable residential neighborhoods of the 19th century, retaining many fine examples of residential architecture from that period. It was listed on the National Register of Historic Places in 2018.

== Description and history ==
Northampton was settled in 1654, and the Pomeroy Terrace area was home to one of its first civic institutions, the Bridge Street Cemetery, located at the northern end of the historic district. Early development was limited to Bridge Street, an extension of Main Street that is now the major east-west road in the area. The town developed industrially in the mid-19th century after the arrival of the north-south railroad, and the area east of the railroad, originally large agricultural lots and estates, was subdivided for development. Its most rapid period of growth was between about 1855 and 1870.

The historic district is defined primarily by the north-south roads of Pomeroy Terrace and Hawley Street, and is about 32 acres (13 ha) in size. These two streets are joined by few connecting streets, all of which have historically significant contributing buildings. The district extends across Bridge Street to include the cemetery, and is directly adjacent to the Parsons, Shepherd, and Damon Houses Historic District. The principal buildings in the district were all built as residences with wooden framing, although some have since been adapted to commercial or professional office use. Stylistically they are diverse, ranging from Federal period houses of the late 18th century on Bridge Street, to Stick Style and Colonial Revival houses of the late 19th and early 20th centuries.

== See also ==
- National Register of Historic Places listings in Hampshire County, Massachusetts
