= Gate Cemetery =

Historic cemetery in Massachusetts, United States

- U.S. National Register of Historic Places
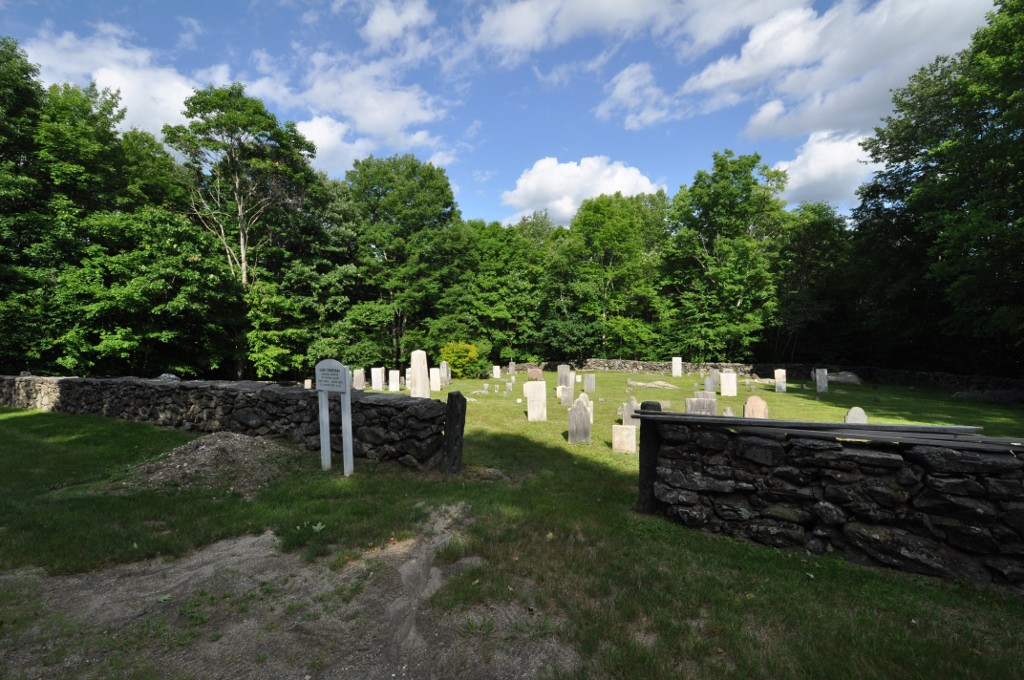
- Gate Cemetery in 2014

- Location within Massachusetts Location within the United States
- Location: Ireland St., Chesterfield, Massachusetts
- Coordinates: 42°23′33″N 72°53′2″W
- Area: less than one acre
- NRHP reference No.: 09000470
- Added to NRHP: July 1, 2009

Gate Cemetery is a historic cemetery on Ireland Street in West Chesterfield, Massachusetts. It is located just under one mile (1.6 km) south of the center of West Chesterfield, the junction of Main Road and Ireland Street. The 1/3 acre cemetery is on a plateau of land on the east side of Ireland Street, flanked to the east by the Westfield River and to the west by a steep hillside. It takes its name from a toll gate that was erected nearby when the area was settled in the late 18th century.

The date of the cemetery's establishment is uncertain, but may be related to a deed transfer of land in the area to the town in 1794. The oldest grave marker, that of Joseph Gere, dates to 1808, while the latest (one of only three dated after 1959) is dated 1997. There are 121 full markers and 26 fragments, and there may be unmarked gravesites. The markers are laid out in 13 rows in the roughly rectangular plot. Most of the markers are marble, although there are number that are granite or slate. Five of the markers are obelisks; none of them exhibit any particular artistic sophistication. The plot is demarcated by fieldstone walls about four feet high; the entrance is marked by two granite posts, into which pockets are carved that hold wooden rails that must be removed to gain access to the grounds. None of the gravesites is fenced off, and there are no circulating paths or roadways on the grounds.

The cemetery, along with the nearby Ireland Street Cemetery, was listed on the National Register of Historic Places in 2009.

== See also ==
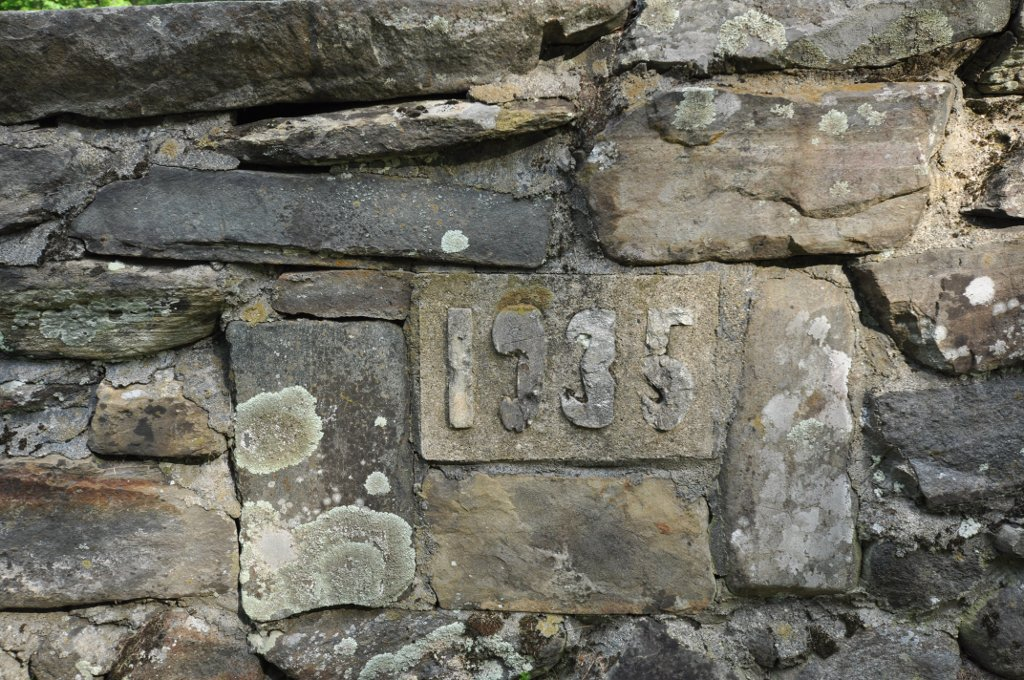
Dated stone embedded in the cemetery wall

- National Register of Historic Places listings in Hampshire County, Massachusetts
