= Lincoln–Sunset Historic District =

Historic district in Massachusetts, United States

- U.S. National Register of Historic Places
- U.S. Historic district
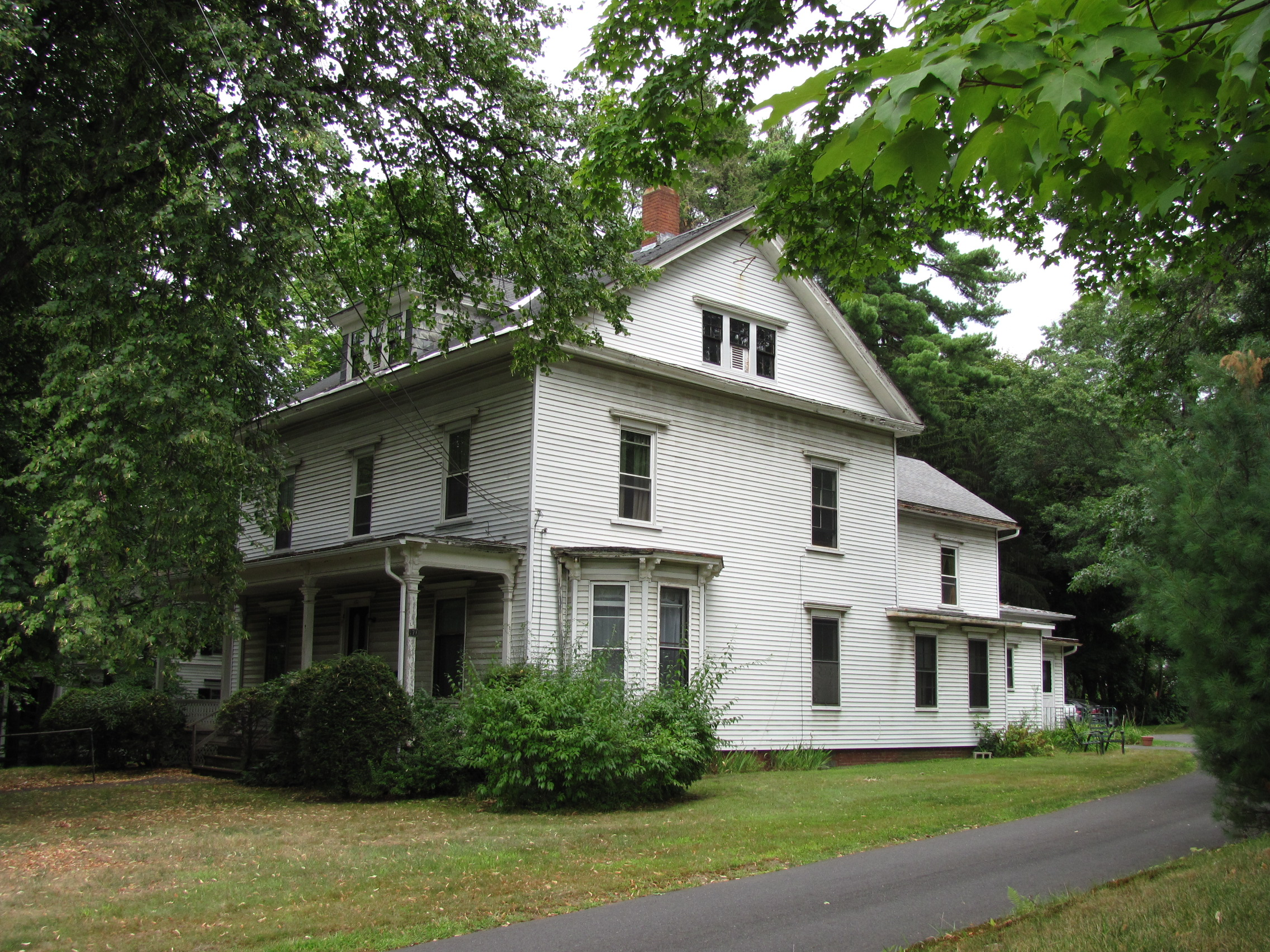
- A house on Lincoln Avenue

- Location within Massachusetts Location within the United States
- Location: Roughly, Lincoln Ave. from Northampton Rd. to Fearing St., Amherst, Massachusetts
- Coordinates: 42°22′33″N 72°31′33″W
- Area: 41.8 acres (16.9 ha)
- Architect: Putnam, Karl
- Architectural style: Colonial Revival, Greek Revival, Italianate
- NRHP reference No.: 93000008
- Added to NRHP: February 22, 1993

The Lincoln–Sunset Historic District is a residential historic district located west of the downtown area of Amherst, Massachusetts. Colloquially known as Millionaire's Row, the district extends along Lincoln and Sunset Avenues between Northampton Street (Massachusetts Route 9) and the campus of the University of Massachusetts, Amherst. This area was one of Amherst's first planned residential subdivisions, and features a large number of high-quality houses, built by merchants, businessmen, and academics. It was added to the National Register of Historic Places in 1993.

== Description and history ==
The town of Amherst was incorporated in 1768, having historically been part of Hadley. The town grew in the 19th century on the basis of a number of local industries, and the growth of both Amherst College and the University of Massachusetts, Amherst. Residential development west of the town center was initially concentrated on Amity Street, then the main road to Hadley, and it is where this district's oldest house, the c. 1751 Solomon Boltwood House, is located. Land south of Amity Street in the area was donated to Amherst College, which remained in agricultural use for the first half of the 19th century. Industry arose east of the town center, where the railroad had been routed, so the west side developed as a fashionable area for the well-to-do business owners, merchants to avoid the odors and density associated with industry. Lincoln Street was formally accepted by the town in 1873, and much of it was platted into house lots by the local partnership of Stockbridge, Westcott & Westcott in 1882. Deeds issued when they sold house lots required minimum building costs and conformity to adjacent properties.

The district is located two blocks west of downtown Amherst, from which it is separated by the Prospect-Gaylord Historic District, a residential district of mainly 19th century houses. It extends along Lincoln Avenue roughly from Fearing Street to Route 9, which it ends just short of. Also included in the district are houses on Sunset Avenue between Amity and Elm Streets. The area is characterized by houses built mostly between 1870 and 1930, although there are some mid-19th-century structures, and some that date to the 1950s. There is a uniformity of scale and landscaping, which was partly imposed by developers who subdivided the area in the late 19th century. The roads are arched over by mature trees, and the houses are set on generous lots with large lawns. Most buildings are 2 1/2 stories in height and of wood-frame construction. The single styles that appear most frequently are the Queen Anne Victorian and the Colonial Revival.

== See also ==
- National Register of Historic Places listings in Hampshire County, Massachusetts
