= The Manse (Northampton, Massachusetts) =

Historic house in Massachusetts, United States

- U.S. National Register of Historic Places
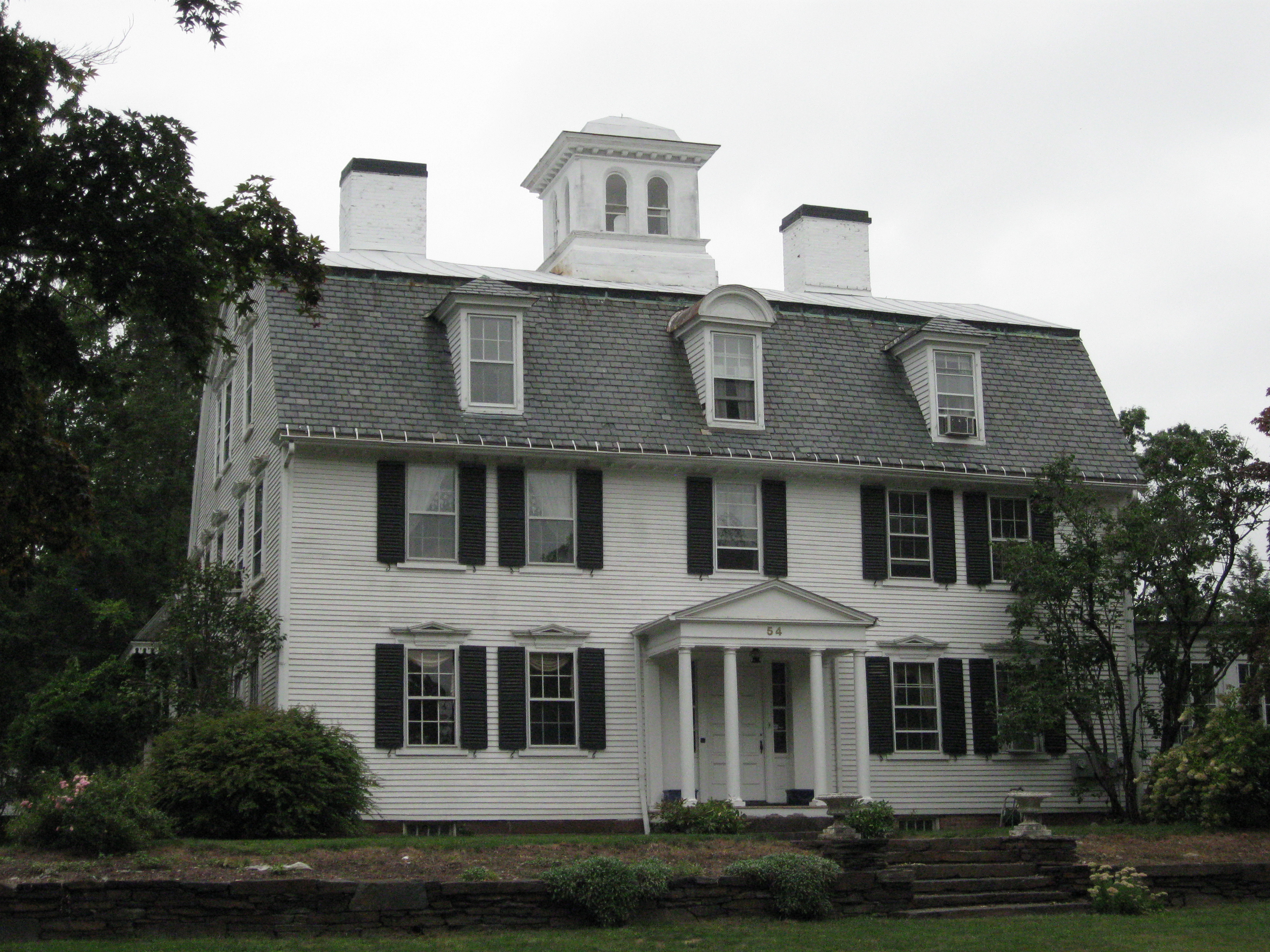
- The Manse, 54 Prospect Street

- Location within Massachusetts Location within the United States
- Location: 54 Prospect St., Northampton, Massachusetts
- Coordinates: 42°19′20″N 72°38′12″W
- Area: 1 acre (0.40 ha)
- Built: 1744
- Architectural style: Georgian
- NRHP reference No.: 76000263
- Added to NRHP: October 14, 1976

The Manse is a historic church manse in Northampton, Massachusetts. With a construction history dating to 1744, it is in part a good example of vernacular mid-18th century architecture. It has also had a procession of locally notable owners and residents. The house was listed on the National Register of Historic Places in 1976.

== Description and history ==
The Manse is located in a residential area north of downtown Northampton, on the west side of Prospect Street at its junction with Trumbull Road. It is a two-story wood-frame structure, with a gambrel style roof and twin interior chimneys. Three dormers pierce the steep slope of the gambrel, the center one with a rounded arch roof, the outer two with hip roofs. A square cupola rises at the center of the roof. A 2 1/2-story ell, the oldest part of the building, extends to the rear.

The property's history begins in the 17th century, when it was part of a land grant to Reverend Solomon Stoddard, whose parsonage was built here in 1684. Stoddard was the pastor of the first church in Northampton and the grandfather of Jonathan Edwards, a leading force in the First Great Awakening who briefly lived in that house. In 1744, Stoddard's son John built what is now the rear ell as a replacement for that house. John Stoddard was active in a civic affairs, serving in the provincial militia and the provincial legislature. His son, also named Solomon, built the front portion of the house in 1782; he served as sheriff of Hampshire County. Other notable residents include Josiah G. Holland, writer and founder of Scribner's Monthly, and Dr. Benjamin Barrett, a prominent local politician. The house was purchased in 1940 by Dorothy Douglas, a professor at Smith College, who oversaw its restoration. She also commissioned a series of murals that now adorn its walls; these were executed by Oliver Larkin.

== See also ==
- National Register of Historic Places listings in Hampshire County, Massachusetts
