= First Congregational Church (South Hadley, Massachusetts) =

Historic church in Massachusetts, United States

- U.S. National Register of Historic Places
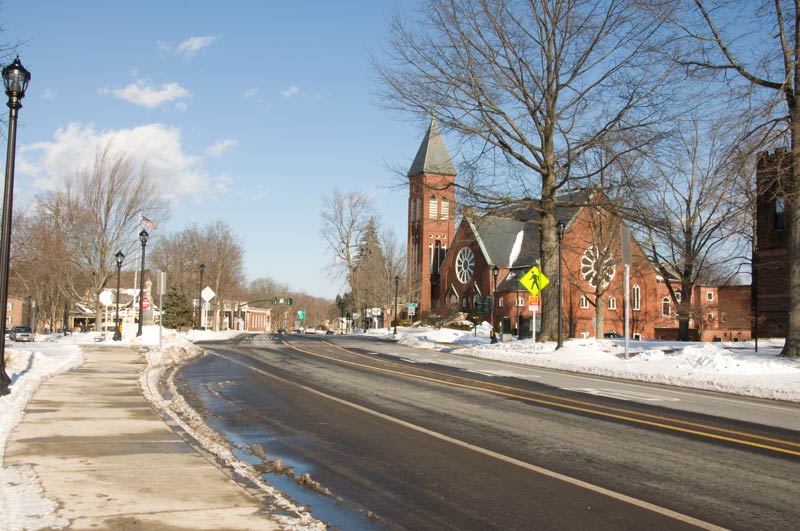
- Distant photograph of the First Congregational Church in 2009

- Location within Massachusetts Location within the United States
- Location: 1 Church St., South Hadley, Massachusetts
- Coordinates: 42°15′31″N 72°34′31″W
- Area: less than one acre
- Built: 1895
- Architect: Preston, Henry J.
- Architectural style: Richardsonian Romanesque
- NRHP reference No.: 100003963
- Added to NRHP: March 3, 2020

The First Congregational Church of South Hadley (also known locally as the Center Church) is a historic church building at 1 Church Street in the center of South Hadley, Massachusetts. Completed in 1895, it is a prominent local example of Romanesque Revival architecture, designed by Henry J. Preston. It was listed on the National Register of Historic Places in 2020. The congregation, founded in 1733, is affiliated with the United Church of Christ.

== Architecture and history ==
South Hadley's First Congregational Church is located in the town center, on a triangular parcel bounded by Church, Park, and College Streets. It is located near the northern end of the town common, and adjacent to the campus of Mount Holyoke College. It is a large masonry structure, built out of red brick with sandstone trim. It is roughly cruciform in shape, with a gable roof on its main axis and wings, and a four-story hip-roofed tower at its northwest corner. Its large gable ends are characterized by large rose windows.

The church was completed in 1895 for the town's first church congregation, founded in 1733. The congregation first met in a wood-frame meetinghouse built that year, which still stands just north of the town green and now houses a commercial establishment. It moved to a second structure built on this site in 1761; this is its fourth building to stand here. It was designed by Henry J. Preston, an architect based on Boston who was once a parishioner, and was completed in 1895 by the Thorpe Brothers of Holyoke. The building includes bricks recovered from the previous church, which was destroyed by fire. A fellowship hall was added to the building in 1956, designed by Alderman & MacNeish of West Springfield.

== See also ==
- National Register of Historic Places listings in Hampshire County, Massachusetts
