= Fort Hill Historic District (Northampton, Massachusetts) =

Historic district in Massachusetts, United States

- U.S. National Register of Historic Places
- U.S. Historic district
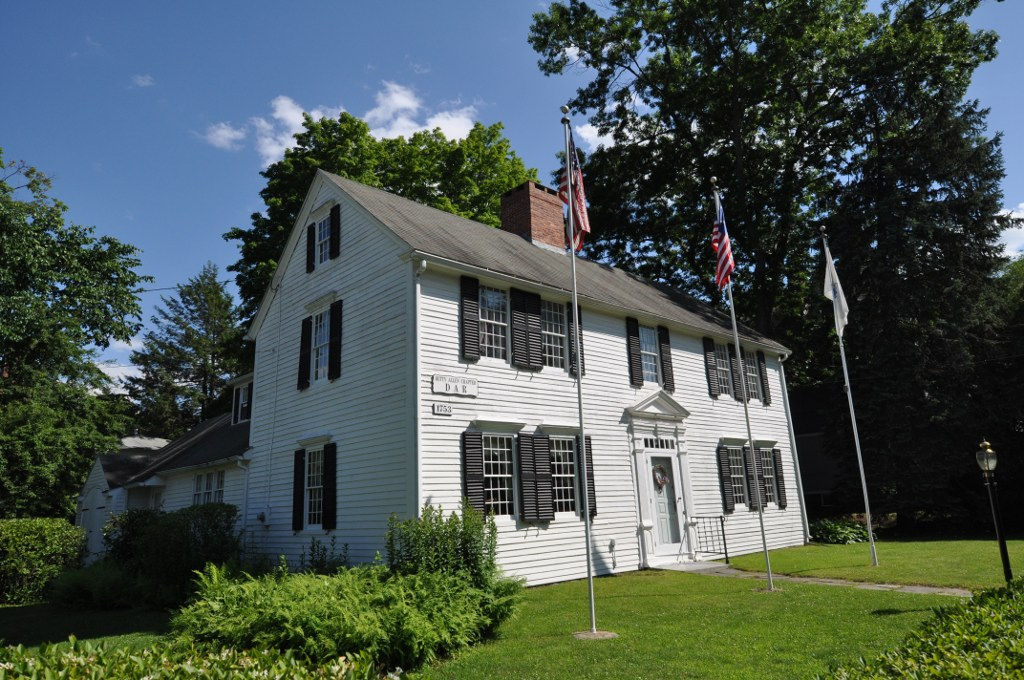
- The Roger Clapp House (DAR Headquarters)

- Location within Massachusetts Location within the United States
- Location: Northampton, Massachusetts
- Coordinates: 42°18′43″N 72°38′1″W
- Area: 2.2 acres (0.89 ha)
- Architectural style: Greek Revival, Colonial, Federal
- NRHP reference No.: 88000910
- Added to NRHP: April 7, 1989

Fort Hill Historic District is a historic district roughly on South Street between Lyman to Monroe in Northampton, Massachusetts.

Fort Hill was listed on the National Register of Historic Places on April 7, 1989. Fort Hill is a collection of well-preserved houses from the 18th and early 19th centuries. The 2.2-acre (0.89 ha) district consists of 5 properties on the east side of South Street and one on the west side:

- The Preserved Bartlett House, 124 South Street (1792)
- The Theodore Bartlett House, 130 South Street (c. 1830)
- The Eleazer Strong House, 133 South Street (c. 1797)
- The Col. Elisha Strong Homestead, 134 South Street (c. 1800)
- The Graves-Parsons House, 144 South Street (c. 1830)
- The Capt. Roger Clapp House, 148 South Street (DAR Headquarters, 1753)

All six buildings are wood-frame structures, 2 1/2 stories in height, with clapboard siding. Five of them have side gable roofs and are five bays wide; the Theodore Bartlett House is a Greek Revival house with a front-facing gable and a three-bay front facade. Three of the houses are basically Georgian colonial in character, the Roger Clapp House being the oldest of these (built c. 1753). Two are Greek Revival, and one, the Eleazer Strong House (built 1797), is one of the city's oldest Federal style houses.

In addition to their age and architectural significance, all six buildings are notable for their association with the families of some of its earliest settlers. Preserved Clapp was one of Northampton's first settlers, and it was his son Roger who built the Clapp House that now stands. The two Strong houses were built by sons of Elder John Strong, another prominent early arrival, and the two Bartlett houses were built by descendants of Robert Bartlett, a town selectman between 1657 and 1663.

== See also ==
- National Register of Historic Places listings in Hampshire County, Massachusetts
