= Strong House (Amherst, Massachusetts) =

Historic house in Massachusetts, United States

- U.S. National Register of Historic Places
- U.S. Historic district – Contributing property
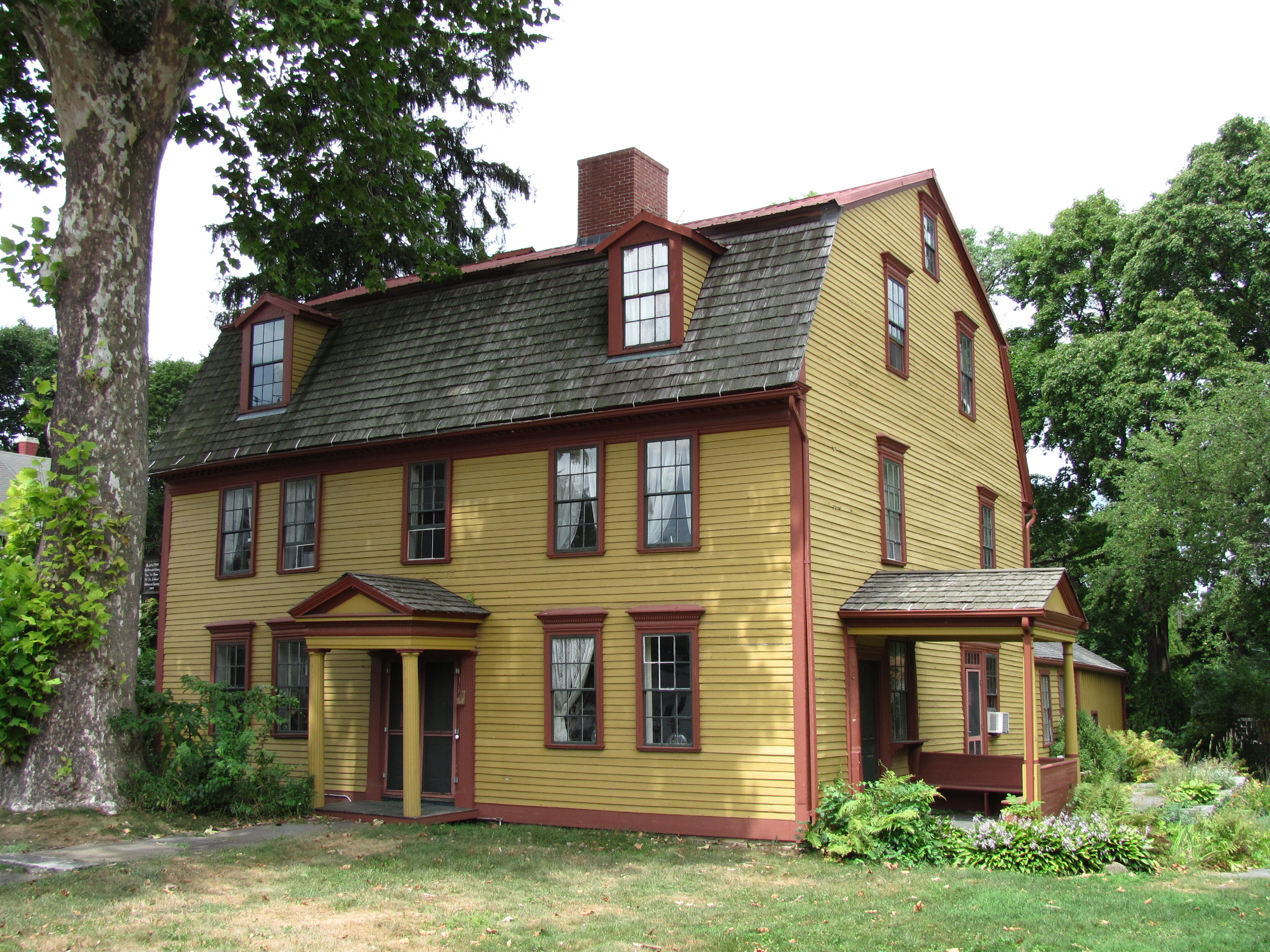
- Strong House

- Location within Massachusetts Location within the United States
- Location: Amherst, Massachusetts
- Coordinates: 42°22′33″N 72°31′19″W
- Area: less than one acre
- Built: c. 1744
- Architectural style: Georgian
- Part of: Amherst Central Business District (ID91001859)
- NRHP reference No.: 84002457

Significant dates
- Added to NRHP: July 5, 1984
- Designated CP: December 27, 1991

The Strong House is a historic house at 67 Amity Street in Amherst, Massachusetts. Built about 1744, it is one of Amherst's oldest surviving houses, and a fine example of mid-18th century Connecticut River Valley architecture. It was given to the Amherst Historical Society in 1916. It currently houses the Amherst History Museum. The house was listed on the National Register of Historic Places in 1984, and included in the Amherst Central Business District in 1991.

== Description and history ==
The Strong House is located just west of the commercial center of Amherst, set well back from the north side of Amity Street at Prospect Street. It is a 2 1/2-story wood-frame structure, with a gambrel roof and clapboarded exterior. Its main facade is five bays wide, with a center entrance sheltered by a gabled portico. The first-floor windows are capped by projecting cornices, and the steep roof face is pierced by two gabled dormers. Although it was first built about 1744, much of its present appearance dates to late 18th-century alterations.

It was built about 1744 by Nehemiah Strong, only six years after formal settlement of Amherst began. Originally a 2 1/2-story saltbox in configuration, it was enlarged by Strong's son Simeon in the 1790s, when the gambrel roof and front portico were added. Simeon Strong was a prominent local lawyer, who served in a number of town posts and also represented it in the state legislature before being appointed to the Massachusetts Supreme Judicial Court. His son and grandson, who continued ownership of the property, were also prominent in local fairs. The house was sold out of the family in 1845 and has served as a museum since its acquisition by the historical society in 1916.

== See also ==
- National Register of Historic Places listings in Hampshire County, Massachusetts
