= Bisbee Mill =

- U.S. National Register of Historic Places
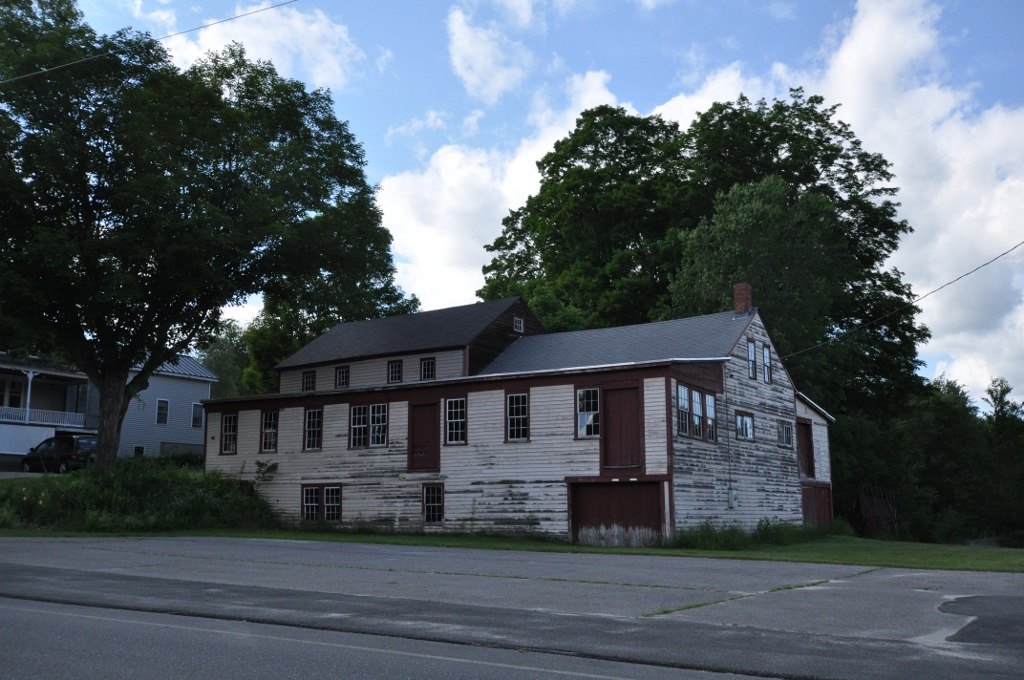
- Bisbee Mill in 2014

- Location within Massachusetts Location within the United States
- Location: Chesterfield, Massachusetts
- Coordinates: 42°22′36″N 72°49′9″W
- NRHP reference No.: 05000219
- Added to NRHP: March 31, 2005

The Bisbee Mill is a historic gristmill at 66 East Street in Chesterfield, Massachusetts. Located on the Dead Branch of the Westfield River, the mill complex includes a wood frame mill building, along with its former mill pond, impounded by a dam across the river, and a canal that brought river water to the mill for power. Also included on the property is the site of the Damon sawmill, which was established in 1761, and the Pierce cornmill, which occupied a site north of the Bisbee mill building in 1823. The Pierce mill was moved to the site, from an earlier one that may also be on the grounds of the Bisbee mill complex.

The Bisbee mill complex has an evolutionary history that begins with the establishment of the mill pond in 1823 by Elisha Bisbee. Neither the dam he built, nor an 1859 dam built to form a second mill pond, have survived. Bisbee also dug a canal to bring water to his new mill building; other canals would also have been dug for the other two mills, but traces of them have not yet been found, and their exact route is not known. The mill building on the site was used, modified, and added onto, by five generations of Bisbees, until it closed its doors in the 1960s. The property was acquired by the Chesterfield Historical Society, which has operated it since 1997 as the Bisbee Mill Museum.

The main mill building started in 1823 as a single 2 1/2-story gable-ended wood frame block measuring 30 feet (9.1 m) by 24 feet (7.3 m). This was extended eastward in the 1850s with the addition of a second block, 20 feet (6.1 m) by 24 feet (7.3 m). The two sections were joined by their end gables, although at slightly different elevations. Both sections were originally on fieldstone foundations; these have been replaced in part with modern concrete, and in part strengthened by the addition of concrete. A third section was added to the building between 1888 and 1829. Measuring 12 feet (3.7 m) by 58 feet (18 m), this section had a shed roof, and was added to the south side of the main blocks. A fourth major addition was made in 1954, when another large section was added to the north side of the building.

Inside the building are the working portions of the mill. The water power it provided was delivered to the three levels of the mill by shafts, gears, and belts, and operated a number of different types of machinery. The major operations were as a gristmill, a woodworking mill, and a smithy. On the bottom level, the wheel pit, located in the original 1823 part of the building, houses a turbine wheel that dates to 1919. All levels of the mill have been adapted to showcase equipment that was used in the mill during its more than 100 year active lifetime.

The mill was listed on the National Register of Historic Places in 2005.

== See also ==
- National Register of Historic Places listings in Hampshire County, Massachusetts
