= National Register of Historic Places listings in Hampshire County, Massachusetts =

Location of Hampshire County in Massachusetts

Hampshire County, Massachusetts, United States, has 84 properties and districts listed on the National Register of Historic Places, including three National Historic Landmarks.

Latitude and longitude coordinates are provided for many National Register properties and districts; these locations may be seen together in a map.

Contents: Counties in Massachusetts

Barnstable | Berkshire | Bristol | Dukes | Essex | Franklin | Hampden | Hampshire | Middlesex | Nantucket | Norfolk | Plymouth | Suffolk | Worcester

This National Park Service list is complete through NPS recent listings posted October 16, 2026.

== Current listings ==
	Name on the Register	Image	Date listed	Location	City or town	Description
1	Amherst Central Business District	Amherst Central Business District	December 27, 1991 (#91001859)	1-79 Main St., 13-31 N. Pleasant St., 1-79 S. Pleasant St., 1-18 Boltwood Ave.; also 30 Boltwood Avenue; 42°22′38″N 72°31′13″W	Amherst	30 Boltwood reflects a boundary increase of August 24, 2011
2	Amherst West Cemetery	Amherst West Cemetery	May 26, 2000 (#00000534)	Triangle St. 42°22′45″N 72°31′07″W	Amherst	
3	Baird House	Baird House	January 3, 1985 (#85000026)	38 Shays St. 42°21′00″N 72°31′09″W	Amherst	
4	Belchertown Center Historic District	Belchertown Center Historic District	June 2, 1982 (#82001913)	Main, Maple, Walnut, Park, and Jabish Sts. 42°16′37″N 72°24′06″W	Belchertown	
5	Belchertown State School	Belchertown State School	July 19, 1994 (#94000688)	30 State St. 42°16′28″N 72°25′27″W	Belchertown	
6	Bisbee Mill	Bisbee Mill	March 31, 2005 (#05000219)	66 East St. 42°22′36″N 72°49′09″W	Chesterfield	
7	Bradstreet Historic District	Bradstreet Historic District	July 17, 1997 (#97000724)	Roughly bounded by Connecticut R., King St. and Stratis Rd. 42°24′19″N 72°35′26″W	Hatfield	
8	William Cullen Bryant Homestead	William Cullen Bryant Homestead	October 15, 1966 (#66000136)	2 mi (3.2 km) from Cummington on a side road 42°28′19″N 72°56′09″W	Cummington	
9	Building at 8–22 Graves Avenue	Building at 8–22 Graves Avenue	November 7, 1985 (#85002784)	8–22 Graves Ave. 42°19′19″N 72°37′44″W	Northampton	
10	Center Cemetery	Center Cemetery	April 16, 2013 (#13000170)	178 College Hwy. (Route 10); 42°14′06″N 72°43′37″W	Southampton	
11	Center Cemetery	Center Cemetery	February 26, 2004 (#04000084)	Sam Hill Rd. 42°23′40″N 72°56′36″W	Worthington	
12	Chesterfield Center Historic District	Chesterfield Center Historic District	December 11, 2008 (#08001177)	Main Rd., South St., North Rd., Bagg Rd., Bryant St. 42°23′30″N 72°50′27″W	Chesterfield	
13	Church Street Historic District	Church Street Historic District	May 23, 1986 (#86001246)	Church St. between Park Ave. and Highland St. 42°15′57″N 72°13′53″W	Ware	
14	Clarke School for the Deaf Historic District	Clarke School for the Deaf Historic District	May 2, 2022 (#100007664)	40-42, 44, 45, 46, 47, 48, 50 and 54 Round Hill Rd. 42°19′24″N 72°38′24″W	Northampton	
15	Conkey-Stevens House	Conkey-Stevens House	May 10, 1979 (#79000352)	664 Main St. 42°22′33″N 72°30′20″W	Amherst	
16	Calvin Coolidge House	Calvin Coolidge House	December 12, 1976 (#76000262)	19-21 Massasoit St. 42°19′29″N 72°38′49″W	Northampton	
17	Cushman Village Historic District	Cushman Village Historic District	November 5, 1992 (#92001553)	Roughly bounded by E. Leverett Rd. and Pine, Henry, Bridge and State Sts. 42°25′03″N 72°30′26″W	Amherst	
18	Dickinson Historic District	Dickinson Historic District	August 16, 1977 (#77000182)	Kellogg Ave., Main, Gray, and Lessey Sts. 42°22′35″N 72°30′55″W	Amherst	
19	Emily Dickinson House	Emily Dickinson House	October 15, 1966 (#66000363)	280 Main St. 42°22′33″N 72°30′52″W	Amherst	
20	Dorsey–Jones House	Dorsey–Jones House	September 2, 2005 (#05000931)	191 Nonotuck St. 42°19′52″N 72°40′18″W	Northampton	Underground Railroad in Massachusetts MPS
21	East Village Historic District	East Village Historic District	July 6, 1986 (#86001408)	Main, N. and S. East Sts. 42°22′36″N 72°30′04″W	Amherst	
22	Elm Street Historic District	Elm Street Historic District	December 7, 2000 (#00001481)	Elm, Sunset, and Scotland Sts., Little Neponset Rd. 42°21′35″N 72°37′00″W	Hatfield	
23	First Congregational Church	First Congregational Church	March 3, 2020 (#100003963)	1 Church St. 42°15′31″N 72°34′31″W	South Hadley	
24	Fort Hill Historic District	Fort Hill Historic District	April 7, 1989 (#88000910)	Roughly South St. from Lyman to Monroe; 42°18′43″N 72°38′01″W	Northampton	
25	Forty Acres and Its Skirts Historic District	Forty Acres and Its Skirts Historic District	May 4, 2023 (#100008956)	113-115, 123, 130 River Dr. 42°22′08″N 72°35′07″W	Hadley	
26	Gate Cemetery	Gate Cemetery	July 1, 2009 (#09000470)	Ireland Street; 42°23′34″N 72°53′02″W	Chesterfield	
27	Goodwin Memorial African Methodist Episcopal Zion Church	Goodwin Memorial African Methodist Episcopal Zion Church	April 28, 2000 (#00000416)	Woodside Ave. 42°22′15″N 72°31′23″W	Amherst	
28	Goshen Town Hall	Goshen Town Hall	August 28, 2018 (#100002829)	42 Main St. 42°26′29″N 72°48′00″W	Goshen	
29	Grove Hill Mansion	Grove Hill Mansion	August 11, 1982 (#82001910)	Florence Rd. and Front St. 42°21′11″N 72°41′58″W	Northampton	
30	Hadley Center Historic District	Hadley Center Historic District	December 2, 1977 (#77000185)	Middle and Russell Sts. 42°20′28″N 72°35′22″W	Hadley	
31	Hatfield Center Historic District	Hatfield Center Historic District	July 27, 1994 (#94000737)	Roughly bounded by the Connecticut and Mill Rivers and Day Ave. 42°21′43″N 72°36′01″W	Hatfield	
32	Haydenville Historic District	Haydenville Historic District	March 26, 1976 (#76000273)	Main and High Sts., and Kingsley Ave. 42°22′31″N 72°42′09″W	Williamsburg	
33	Hockanum Rural Historic District	Hockanum Rural Historic District	December 30, 1993 (#93001474)	Area surrounding Hockanum Rd., from Hockanum Cemetery to the NE corner of Skinner State Park; 42°17′52″N 72°35′53″W	Hadley	
34	Huntington Village Historic District	Huntington Village Historic District	September 15, 1999 (#99001080)	Roughly along E. Main, Main, Russell, Upper Russell and Basket Sts. 42°14′07″N 72°52′54″W	Huntington	
35	Ireland Street Cemetery	Ireland Street Cemetery	July 1, 2009 (#09000471)	Ireland Street; 42°21′54″N 72°53′03″W	Chesterfield	
36	Lincoln-Sunset Historic District	Lincoln-Sunset Historic District	February 22, 1993 (#93000008)	Roughly, Lincoln Ave. from Northampton Rd. to Fearing St. 42°22′33″N 72°31′33″W	Amherst	
37	Lockville Historic District	Lockville Historic District	January 24, 2001 (#00001657)	College Hwy. 42°12′42″N 72°43′52″W	Southampton	
38	Main Street Historic District	Main Street Historic District	March 17, 1986 (#86000451)	Main St. between Northampton and Center Sts. 42°16′11″N 72°40′22″W	Easthampton	
39	The Manse	The Manse	October 14, 1976 (#76000263)	54 Prospect St. 42°19′20″N 72°38′12″W	Northampton	
40	Middlefield-Becket Stone Arch Railroad Bridge District	Middlefield-Becket Stone Arch Railroad Bridge District	April 11, 1980 (#80000502)	Middlefield vicinity 42°18′44″N 73°01′10″W	Middlefield	
41	Middlefield Center Historic District	Middlefield Center Historic District	October 3, 2012 (#12000827)	138-188 Skyline Trail, & 7 Bell Rd. 42°20′55″N 73°00′55″W	Middlefield	
42	Mill-Prospect Street Historic District	Mill-Prospect Street Historic District	October 22, 2002 (#02001188)	Prospect, Chestnut, Bridge, School Sts., Raymond Ave., Prospect Court; 42°22′31″N 72°36′47″W	Hatfield	
43	Miss Florence Diner	Miss Florence Diner	September 22, 1999 (#99001123)	99 Main St. 42°20′07″N 72°40′18″W	Northampton	
44	Mountain Rest	Mountain Rest	November 10, 1983 (#83003984)	Wildwood Lane off Spruce Corner Rd. 42°27′36″N 72°50′23″W	Goshen	An early 19th century missionary retreat camp; converted into condominiums in 1987.
45	Nashawannuck Mills Historic District	Nashawannuck Mills Historic District	February 12, 2015 (#15000001)	1-15 Cottage St. 42°15′57″N 72°40′02″W	Easthampton	
46	North Amherst Center Historic District	North Amherst Center Historic District	December 13, 1991 (#91001824)	1184-1136 N. Pleasant St., 1-39 Pine St., 11-13 Meadow St. 42°24′33″N 72°31′52″W	Amherst	
47	North Cemetery	North Cemetery	March 3, 2004 (#04000121)	Cold St. 42°25′22″N 72°56′49″W	Worthington	
48	North Hadley Historic District	North Hadley Historic District	December 30, 1993 (#93001475)	Roughly, area along River Dr.from Stockwell Rd. to Stockbridge St., including French, Meadow and Mt. Warner Sts. 42°23′23″N 72°34′50″W	Hadley	
49	North Hatfield Historic District	North Hatfield Historic District	October 30, 1997 (#97000879)	Roughly along West St. and Depot Rd. Between I-91 and MA 10; 42°24′33″N 72°37′26″W	Hatfield	
50	Northampton Downtown Historic District	Northampton Downtown Historic District	May 17, 1976 (#76000270)	Roughly bounded by Hampton, Pearl, Strong, Bedford, Elm, MA 66, and railroad tracks 42°19′05″N 72°37′57″W	Northampton	Boundary increase approved July 3, 1985.
51	Northampton State Hospital	Northampton State Hospital	July 25, 1994 (#94000696)	1 Prince St. 42°18′45″N 72°39′16″W	Northampton	Facilities largely demolished in the 2000s.
52	Northampton Veterans Administration Hospital Historic District	Northampton Veterans Administration Hospital Historic District	December 4, 2012 (#12000994)	421 N. Main St. 42°20′59″N 72°40′54″W	Northampton	
53	Old Chapel	Old Chapel	May 11, 2015 (#15000211)	144 Hicks Way; 42°23′20″N 72°31′41″W	Amherst	One of the oldest buildings on the campus of the University of Massachusetts Amherst.
54	Old Mill Site Historic District	Old Mill Site Historic District	June 2, 1982 (#82001911)	48 and 50 Prospect St. 42°22′16″N 72°35′49″W	Hatfield	
55	Otis Company Mill No. 1	Otis Company Mill No. 1	May 2, 1982 (#82001909)	E. Main St. 42°15′31″N 72°14′20″W	Ware	
56	Parsons, Shepherd, and Damon Houses Historic District	Parsons, Shepherd, and Damon Houses Historic District	June 6, 2001 (#01000627)	46, 58 and 66 Bridge St. 42°19′20″N 72°37′35″W	Northampton	
57	Pelham Town Hall Historic District	Pelham Town Hall Historic District	November 23, 1971 (#71000085)	Amherst Rd. at the corner of Daniel Shays Hwy. 42°23′32″N 72°24′16″W	Pelham	
58	Plainfield Center Historic District	Plainfield Center Historic District	July 27, 2015 (#15000468)	Portions of Church Ln., Broom, Central, Main, Pleasant & Union Sts. 42°30′58″N 72°54′48″W	Plainfield	
59	Pomeroy Terrace Historic District	Pomeroy Terrace Historic District	May 11, 2018 (#100002420)	Pomeroy Terr., Phillips & Butler Pls., Bixby Ct., Hawley, Hancock, & Bridge Sts. 42°19′13″N 72°37′30″W	Northampton	
60	Porter-Phelps-Huntington House	Porter-Phelps-Huntington House	March 26, 1973 (#73000303)	130 River Dr. 42°22′19″N 72°35′24″W	Hadley	
61	Prospect-Gaylord Historic District	Prospect-Gaylord Historic District	February 4, 1993 (#93000007)	Roughly, Prospect St. from Northampton Rd. to Hallock St. and Gaylord and Amity Sts. W from Prospect toward Lincoln Ave. 42°22′33″N 72°31′22″W	Amherst	
62	Ringville Cemetery	Ringville Cemetery	February 11, 2004 (#04000024)	Witt Hill Rd. 42°22′13″N 72°54′56″W	Worthington	
63	Ross Farm	Ross Farm	January 8, 2008 (#07001360)	123 Meadow St. 42°20′02″N 72°40′49″W	Northampton	Underground Railroad in Massachusetts MPS
64	Smith Alumnae Gymnasium	Smith Alumnae Gymnasium	April 30, 1976 (#76000259)	Smith College campus Green St. 42°19′01″N 72°38′18″W	Northampton	
65	South Amherst Common Historic District	South Amherst Common Historic District	February 17, 1995 (#95000100)	445 Shays St., South Amherst Common, 979-1081 S. East St. and 324 Pomeroy Ln. 42°20′29″N 72°30′18″W	Amherst	
66	South Hadley Canal Historic District	South Hadley Canal Historic District	March 11, 1992 (#92000077)	Along the historic canal route near the Connecticut River; 42°13′15″N 72°36′33″W	South Hadley	
67	South Worthington Historic District	South Worthington Historic District	September 1, 2005 (#05000935)	Ireland St., Conwell Rd., Huntington Rd., Thrasher Hill Rd., Higgins Rd. S. Worthington Rd. 42°20′47″N 72°53′36″W	Worthington and Chesterfield	
68	Southampton Center Historic District	Southampton Center Historic District	April 4, 1991 (#91000363)	Roughly, High St. from Fomer Rd. to Maple St., College Hwy. from Clark St. to East St. and East from College to Clark; 42°13′25″N 72°43′55″W	Southampton	
69	Strong House	Strong House	July 5, 1984 (#84002457)	67 Amity St. 42°22′33″N 72°31′19″W	Amherst	
70	The Town Farm	The Town Farm	September 12, 1996 (#96000950)	75 Oliver St. 42°16′50″N 72°41′51″W	Easthampton	
71	Upper Main Street Historic District	Upper Main Street Historic District	July 22, 1994 (#94000735)	Main St. from 83 Main to Cow Bridge, 1-44 King St. and 6-70 North St. 42°23′15″N 72°35′52″W	Hatfield	
72	US Post Office-Easthampton Main	US Post Office-Easthampton Main	April 1, 1986 (#86000714)	19 Union St. 42°16′10″N 72°40′19″W	Easthampton	
73	US Post Office-South Hadley Main	US Post Office-South Hadley Main	May 28, 1986 (#86001188)	1 Hadley St. 42°15′30″N 72°34′31″W	South Hadley	
74	Walker-Collis House	Walker-Collis House	September 30, 1982 (#82001903)	1 Stadler St. 42°16′21″N 72°24′38″W	Belchertown	
75	Ware Center Historic District	Ware Center Historic District	May 8, 1986 (#86001013)	MA 9 and Greenwich Plains Rd. 42°15′40″N 72°16′42″W	Ware	
76	Ware Millyard Historic District	Ware Millyard Historic District	November 21, 1986 (#86003508)	Roughly bounded by South St., the Ware River, Upper Dam Complex, Park St., Otis Ave. and Church St. 42°15′33″N 72°14′17″W	Ware	
77	Ware Town Hall	Ware Town Hall	June 26, 1986 (#86001403)	Main and West Sts. 42°15′36″N 72°14′35″W	Ware	
78	Ware-Hardwick Covered Bridge	Ware-Hardwick Covered Bridge	May 8, 1986 (#86001006)	Old Gilbertville Rd. and Bridge St. 42°18′37″N 72°12′45″W	Ware	
79	West Chesterfield Historic District	West Chesterfield Historic District	September 25, 2008 (#08000950)	1-70 Ireland St. and unnumbered lots, 620-669 Main Rd., section of Cummington Rd. 42°24′12″N 72°52′37″W	Chesterfield	
80	West Hatfield Historic District	West Hatfield Historic District	February 24, 2005 (#05000079)	3-12 Church Ave., 2 Linseed Rd., 23-42 West St. 42°22′19″N 72°38′12″W	Hatfield	
81	Western Railroad Stone Arch Bridges and Chester Factory Village Depot	Western Railroad Stone Arch Bridges and Chester Factory Village Depot	January 13, 2021 (#100006273)	Vicinity of Herbert Cross Road, Middlefield/Becket Line (Bridges and Roadbed); 10 Prospect Street (Depot); 42°18′20″N 73°00′19″W	Middlefield	Extends into Chester and Becket; includes a subset of the Middlefield-Becket Stone Arch Railroad Bridge District.
82	Westside Historic District	Westside Historic District	July 25, 2000 (#00000793)	Baker and Snell Sts., Northampton Rd., and Hazel Ave. 42°22′00″N 72°31′51″W	Amherst	
83	Williamsburg Center Historic District	Williamsburg Center Historic District	June 22, 1980 (#80000506)	MA 9; 42°23′32″N 72°43′49″W	Williamsburg	
84	Woodbridge Street Historic District	Woodbridge Street Historic District	November 14, 1983 (#83003987)	3 and 7 Silver St., 25-82 Woodbridge St. 42°15′52″N 72°34′21″W	South Hadley	

== See also ==
- List of National Historic Landmarks in Massachusetts
- National Register of Historic Places listings in Massachusetts
