= Woodbridge Street Historic District =

Historic district in Massachusetts, United States

- U.S. National Register of Historic Places
- U.S. Historic district
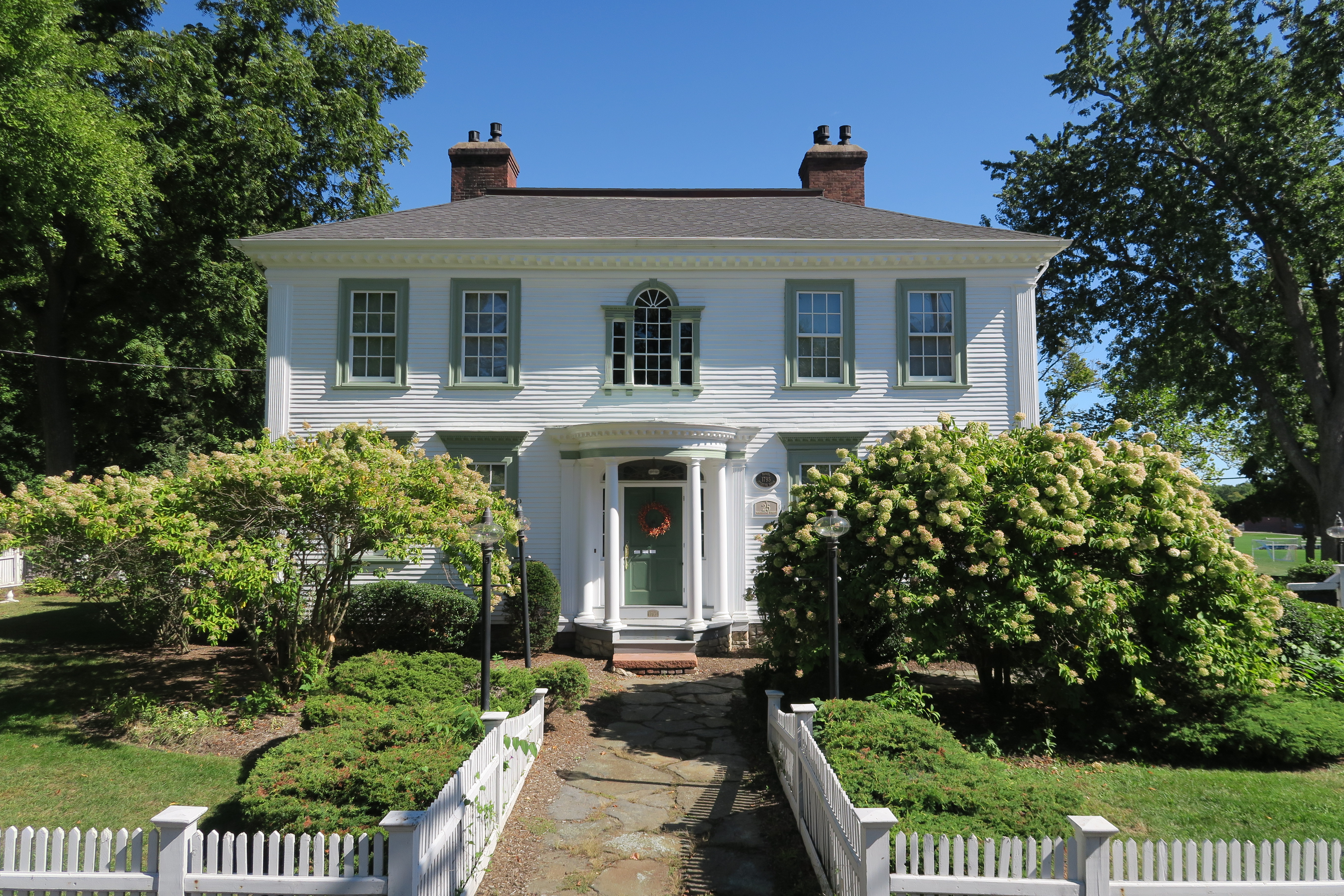
- Daniel Stebbins House in 2016

- Location within Massachusetts Location within the United States
- Location: 3 and 7 Silver St., 25–82 Woodbridge St., South Hadley, Massachusetts
- Coordinates: 42°15′52″N 72°34′21″W
- Area: 66 acres (27 ha)
- Architectural style: Georgian, Federal
- NRHP reference No.: 83003987
- Added to NRHP: November 14, 1983

The Woodbridge Street Historic District is a predominantly residential historic district in South Hadley, Massachusetts, United States. It extends from the junction of Woodbridge Street and Silver Street north roughly to Woodbridge Terrace. This area was one of the first to be settled in South Hadley, and includes its oldest buildings, which date to the 1720s. It also has the community's highest concentration of high-quality 18th-century residential architecture. It was listed on the National Register of Historic Places in 1983.

The area that is now South Hadley was originally common land held by the citizens of Hadley. This status ended with a division of land among the taxpayers in 1720, with settlement following soon afterward. Woodbridge Street was then the principal road between Hadley and Amherst, and was where a number of new homes were erected in the following years. One of the district's oldest surviving structures, now the rear ell of 82 Woodbridge Street, was built by Joseph White in 1727. The area remained agricultural into the 20th century, and benefited from the early preservation efforts of philanthropist Joseph Allen Skinner, who funded the restoration of a number of its houses in the early 20th century.

The district includes properties from 25 through 82 Woodbridge Street, and at 3 and 7 Silver Street. The majority of buildings in the district are houses that were built in the 18th and 19th centuries. One of the more notable properties is the Skinner Museum of nearby Mount Holyoke College, which is located in the former Prescott, Massachusetts congregational church. The 19th century Greek Revival church was relocated here Joseph Skinner in the 1930s when the construction of the Quabbin Reservoir necessitated the unincorporation of the small town.

== See also ==
- National Register of Historic Places listings in Hampshire County, Massachusetts
