= Plainfield Center Historic District =

Historic district in Massachusetts, United States

- U.S. National Register of Historic Places
- U.S. Historic district
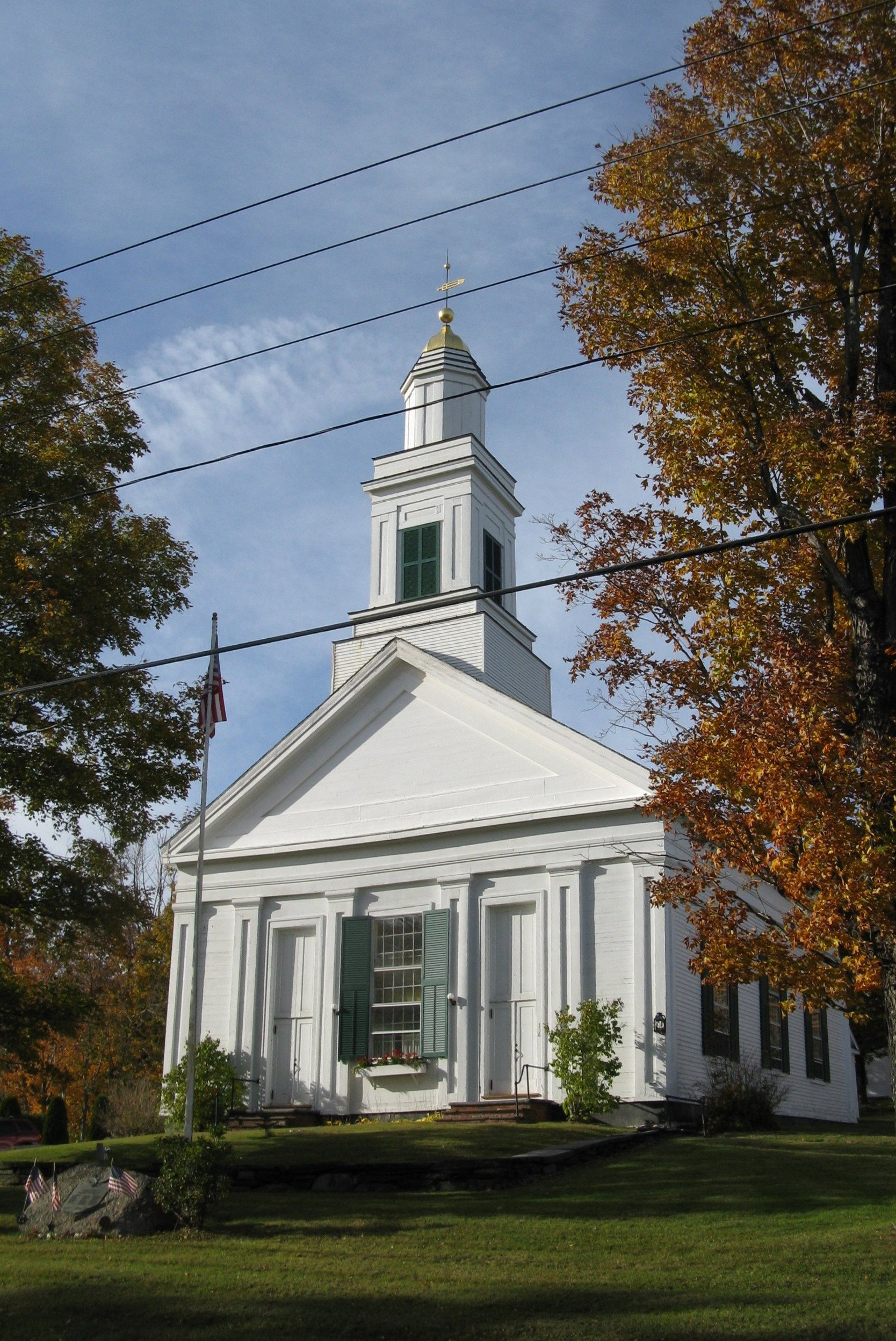
- Plainfield Congregational Church

- Location within Massachusetts Location within the United States
- Location: Portions of Church Ln., Broom, Central, Main, Pleasant & Union Sts., Plainfield, Massachusetts
- Coordinates: 42°30′58″N 72°54′49″W
- Area: 730 acres (300 ha)
- NRHP reference No.: 15000468
- Added to NRHP: July 27, 2015

The Plainfield Center Historic District encompasses the historic rural village center of Plainfield, Massachusetts. The district is centered on a stretch of Main Street (Massachusetts Route 116), between Church Lane and Central Street, and includes the town's oldest surviving houses, and its congregational church, set on the site of its first colonial-era meeting house, as well as the town hall (1847) and library (1925). The district was listed on the National Register of Historic Places in 2015.

== Description and history ==
The area that is now Plainfield was first settled in 1769, and was incorporated out of Cummington in 1785. The town center arose on one of the town's larger areas of flattish terrain, there being steep rises and falls to the east and west. Always rural and agricultural, the town in its early years had a few grist and sawmills, built mainly to serve local needs. The town center area benefited from the establishment of a water company in 1816, which built an aqueduct to provide water to the area in wooden pipes. Its first meeting house was built in 1792, the same year the Old Burying Ground was laid out.

The historic district, built infrastructure is centered along Main Street, extending a short way north to the junction of Union and Central Streets, where the Hilltop Cemetery, the town's second, is located. It extends southward along Central Street, which follows a hill terrace, as far as Pleasant Street. This lobe includes more dispersed residential architecture and an extensive rural landscape. This area is home to the town's oldest houses, mostly Cape-style frame buildings dating to the 1780s. The district is about 730 acres (300 ha) in size because of this section and a smaller southern extension of Union Street.

== See also ==
- National Register of Historic Places listings in Hampshire County, Massachusetts
