= Huntington Village Historic District =

Historic district in Massachusetts, United States

- U.S. National Register of Historic Places
- U.S. Historic district
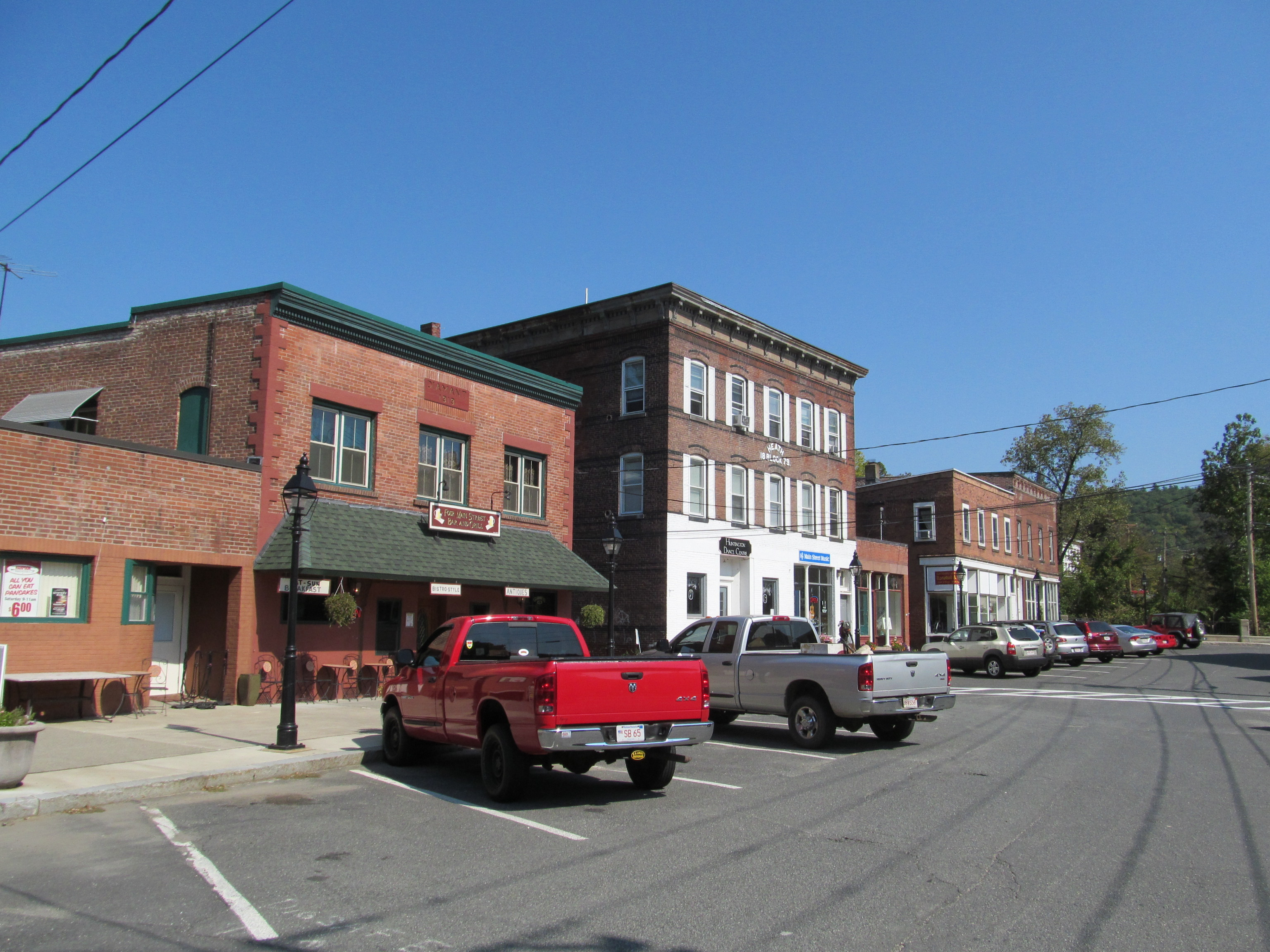
- Main Street

- Location within Massachusetts Location within the United States
- Location: Huntington, Massachusetts
- Coordinates: 42°14′7″N 72°52′54″W
- Area: 61.8 acres (25.0 ha)
- Built: 1841
- Architect: Desmond & Lord; George H. Delano, et al.
- Architectural style: Greek Revival, Italianate
- NRHP reference No.: 99001080
- Added to NRHP: September 15, 1999

The Huntington Village Historic District encompasses the historic village center of Huntington, Massachusetts, USA. The village lies on the west branch of the Westfield River, at the junction of US Route 20 (Russell Road) and Massachusetts Route 112 (East Main Street and Bridge Road). The district was listed on the National Register of Historic Places in 1999. The village is the most densely populated part of Huntington, and has been its commercial and civic heart since the early 19th century. It has been divided by the river because its unifying feature, a location where bridges stood since 1810, no longer has one, and the modern replacement bridge built after a 1938 flood just south of the center, does not readily combine the developed areas on either side.

Most of the district was built up between the middle 19th and middle 20th centuries. The area was home to several textile mills, powered by the Westfield River, but none of which have survived. Most of the district's contributing properties are therefore residential, commercial, and civic, and represent a diversity of architectural styles, predominantly from the mid to late 19th century. The district includes properties along the two main roads, as well as Upper Russell, Basket, Laurel, Pleasant, and Park Streets. Of particular architectural note are a concentration of Greek Revival houses characterized by their temple fronts, found in the western part of the village, and Stanton Hall, a fine Italianate structure built as a church, but now owned by the town.

== Political career ==
=== Beginnings ===
In 1983, he began occupying positions in the municipality of the city of Córdoba and at the provincial level: he was Director of Youth Promotion and Cultural Action of the provincial government (1983-1987), head of the Ibero-American Union of Municipalists, General Director of Culture (1987-1991). Undersecretary of Culture, Education and Tourism (1991-1995), Municipal Constituent Convention (1995), Secretary of Government (1995-1999), Secretary of Human Development and Municipal Neighborhood Participation (1999) and councilman of the capital city of Córdoba (1999-2003) and provincial legislator for the Radical Civic Union between 2004 and 2007.

In the period from 2007 to 2015, the then Governor Juan Schiaretti added to his cabinet. During those years he served as President of the Córdoba Tourism Agency as in charge of tourism in his home province. During his administration the workers of the ministry denounce arbitrary changes that modified the structure of the area of Supply Development with the sole purpose of generating new political positions for friends and relatives of Macrista officials.

== See also ==
- National Register of Historic Places listings in Hampshire County, Massachusetts
