= Lockville Historic District =

Historic district in Massachusetts, United States

- U.S. National Register of Historic Places
- U.S. Historic district
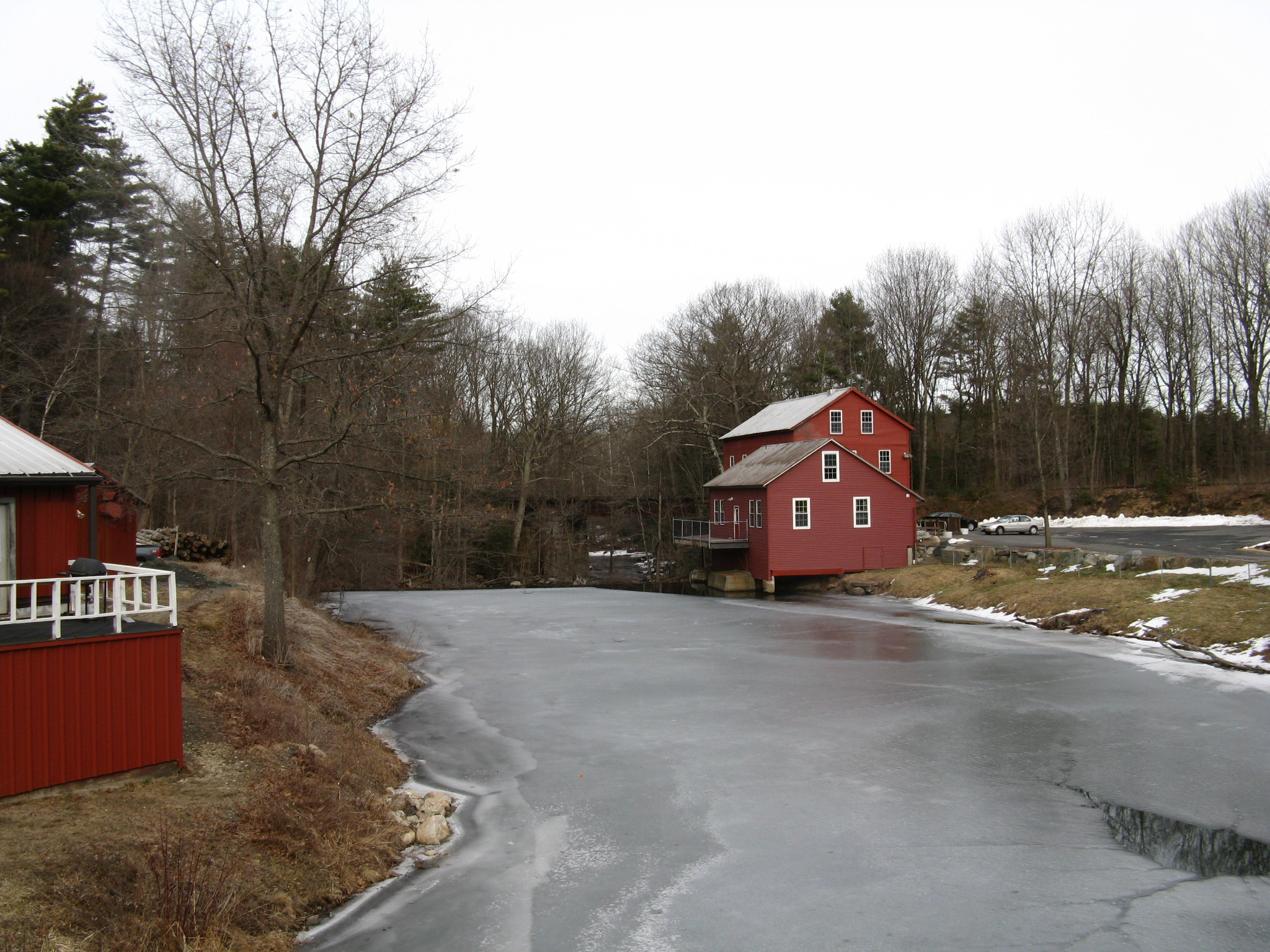
- Lyman Pond

- Location within Massachusetts Location within the United States
- Location: Southampton, Massachusetts
- Coordinates: 42°12′42″N 72°43′52″W
- Built: 1786
- Architect: Stephen Wolcott
- Architectural style: Georgian, Federal
- NRHP reference No.: 00001657
- Added to NRHP: January 24, 2001

The Lockville Historic District is a historic district encompassing the area of a historic mill village in Southampton, Massachusetts. The district is located about 1 mile (1.6 km) south of Southampton Center along College Highway (Massachusetts Route 10), in the area where the road crosses the Manhan River. The river in this area provided a drop in elevation that was used to provide power for a modest mill complex, which operated from the 1830s until about 1900. The district includes the house of the first documented mill family, the Ichabod Strong House (c. 1786), the Lyman Mill (established c. 1854), Lyman Pond and the dam that impounds it (built in 1838 after a flood washed out the previous dam).

The area also includes a sheet metal factory established by the Lyman family in 1894. This business became more prominent after the mills were forced to close due to a loss of water power after the city of Holyoke began drawing water from the river. There is also a remnant of the c. 1835 New Haven and Northampton Canal, which traversed three locks in the area, giving it its name. Other features associated with the canal include a former hotel building, a storehouse (both now private residences), and the remains of one of the locks.

The areas around Lyman Pond are thought to include industrial archeological remnants from mills that may have been established as early as 1732. The district was listed on the National Register of Historic Places in 2001.

== See also ==
- National Register of Historic Places listings in Hampshire County, Massachusetts
