= Building at 8–22 Graves Avenue =

- U.S. National Register of Historic Places
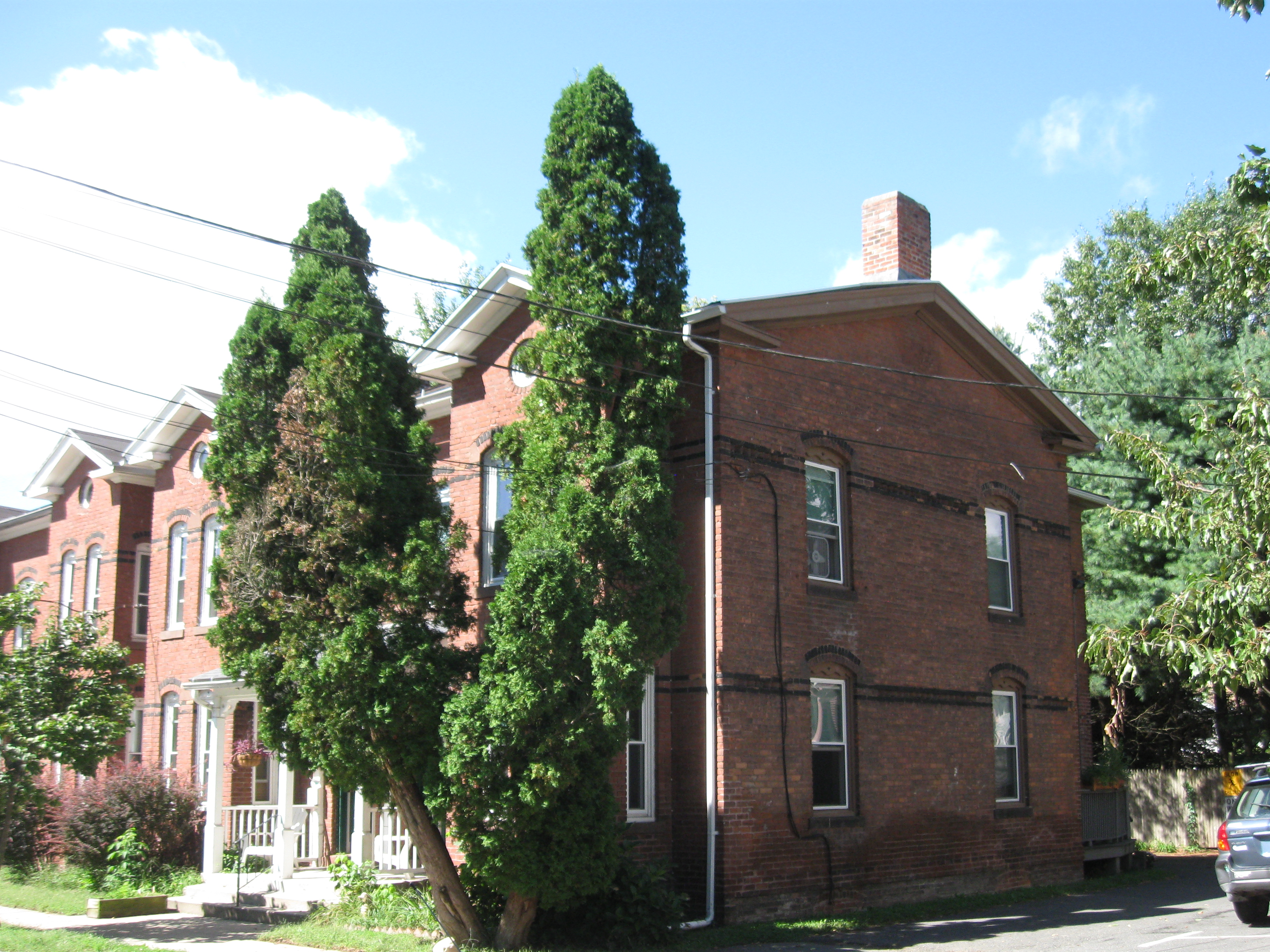

- Location within Massachusetts Location within the United States
- Location: 8–22 Graves Ave., Northampton, Massachusetts
- Coordinates: 42°19′19″N 72°37′44″W
- Area: 1.6 acres (0.65 ha)
- Built: 1887
- Architectural style: Queen Anne
- NRHP reference No.: 85002784
- Added to NRHP: November 7, 1985

The Building at 8–22 Graves Avenue is a historic rowhouse just outside the downtown area of Northampton, Massachusetts. The Queen Anne style brick rowhouse was built in 1887 for Doctor Silas R. Cooley. The building was listed on the National Register of Historic Places in 1985.

== Description and history ==
Graves Street is a dead-end residential street that parallels Bridge Street (Massachusetts Route 9) off Market Street just northeast of downtown Northampton from which it is separate by a railroad right-of-way. Number 8-22 is located on the north side. It consists of a row of eight residential units constructed in rowhouse fashion out of red brick. The units are arranged in pairs that are mirror images, with windows set in segmented arch openings, projecting window bays on the ground floor, and entrances sheltered by gabled porches. Each unit has a gable peak above it, in which is a round window. At the rear, each pair of units shares a projecting service ell.

The rowhouses were built about 1887, during a major period of growth in the city. It was built on the former house lot of Elisha Graves, which was platted for subdivision in 1884, creating Graves Avenue. The first documented owner of the building was Silas Cooley, who became a major landowner in the region; this was one of his early acquisitions. Its early occupants were members of the city's growing working class, and included a photographer, milk contractor, and telegraph operator.

== See also ==
- National Register of Historic Places listings in Hampshire County, Massachusetts
