= Walker-Collis House =

Historic house in Massachusetts, United States

- U.S. National Register of Historic Places
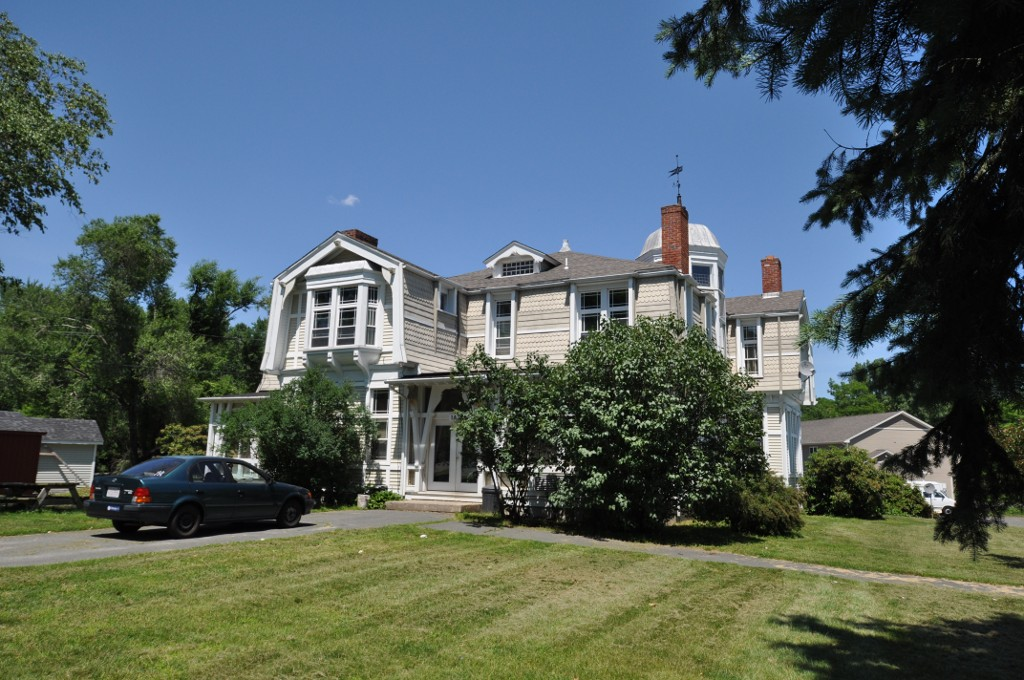
- Walker-Collis House in 2013

- Location within Massachusetts Location within the United States
- Location: 1 Stadler St., Belchertown, Massachusetts
- Coordinates: 42°16′21″N 72°24′38″W
- Area: 1.3 acres (0.53 ha)
- Built: 1880
- Built by: Hoag, Henry
- Architectural style: Stick/Eastlake, Queen Anne
- NRHP reference No.: 82001903
- Added to NRHP: September 30, 1982

The Walker-Collis House is a historic house at 1 Stadler Street in Belchertown, Massachusetts. Originally located facing the Belchertown Common, this 1880 Victorian, one of the most architecturally exuberant buildings in the town, was moved to its present location in 1976. It was listed on the National Register of Historic Places in 1982.

== Description and history ==
The Walker-Collis House occupies a prominent location in the town center of Belchertown, at the southeast corner of Stadler Street at United States Route 202. It is a rambling 2 1/2-story wood-frame structure, roughly rectangular in plan, with a roof that is a hybrid style between mansard and gambrel roofs. The second story face is angled in the mansard style, but finished with wooden shingling, while the steeper top portion of the roof is finished in asphalt shingles. Exterior finishes include liberally applied Stick style elements, and interior finishes are lavish.

The house was built in 1880 by Myron Walker (1846-1911), a state senator who had spent significant time in New York and California. Walker had made a fortune during his travels, and reportedly spent $30,000 to build the lavish mansion; the gas heating plant in the building was also said to be used for heating of the bandstand on the common, and to provide gas street lighting in the area. Walker's fortune fell after his 1889 divorce, and the property was inherited by his nephew. It was then owned for much of the 20th century by the Collis family. Threatened with demolition, it was moved to its present site in 1976 and rehabilitated.

== See also ==
- National Register of Historic Places listings in Hampshire County, Massachusetts
