= Middlefield Center Historic District =

Historic district in Massachusetts, United States

- U.S. National Register of Historic Places
- U.S. Historic district
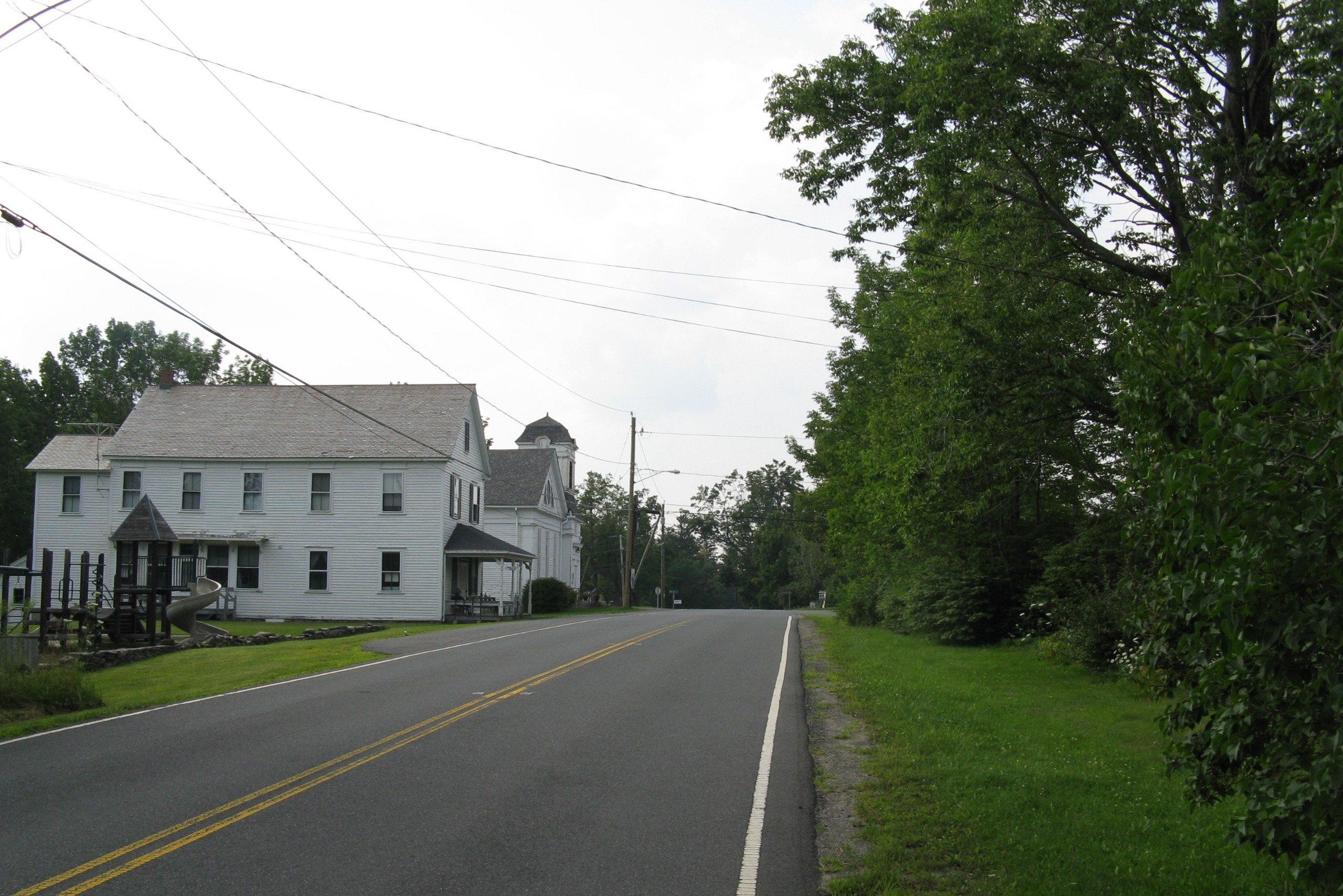

- Location within Massachusetts Location within the United States
- Location: Skyline Trail, Bell and Town Hill Rds., Middlefield, Massachusetts
- Coordinates: 42°20′55″N 73°0′55″W
- Area: 292 acres (118 ha)
- NRHP reference No.: 12000827
- Added to NRHP: October 3, 2012

The Middlefield Center Historic District encompasses the historic village center of Middlefield, Massachusetts. It is centered on the junction of Skyline Trail, the main north-south road, with Bell and Town Hill Roads. The district was listed on the National Register of Historic Places in 2012.

== Description and history ==
Permanent settlement of Middlefield began c. 1770, and the center area was one of the first places to be cleared. After the town was incorporated in 1783, the townspeople established a meetinghouse in the area, and it began to grow as the center of the new town's civic life. During the 19th century the center retained its sense as an agricultural village center, bolstered by the establishment of fairgrounds and an agricultural hall in the 1850s. Most of the village's historic development was along Skyline Trail, where most of the district's contributing properties lie; the rest lie along Bell Road, leading from the center toward the fairground (which is also part of the district).

The oldest buildings in the district are Federal in style, with the oldest, the Daniel Chapman House at 140 Skyline Trail, built in 1780. Most of the district's buildings are residences, of which the Oliver Church House, built in 1869, is one of the region's finest examples of Italianate architecture. There are three examples of Craftsman architecture, all of which feature native stone elements on the exterior. One tavern survives, dating to about 1820, as do two commercial buildings. The town's former town hall, built in 1901, has Queen Anne Victorian features, and the Congregational Church is an eclectic combination of styles, the product of alterations and additions following a 1901 fire.

== See also ==
- National Register of Historic Places listings in Hampshire County, Massachusetts
