= Goshen Town Hall =

- U.S. National Register of Historic Places
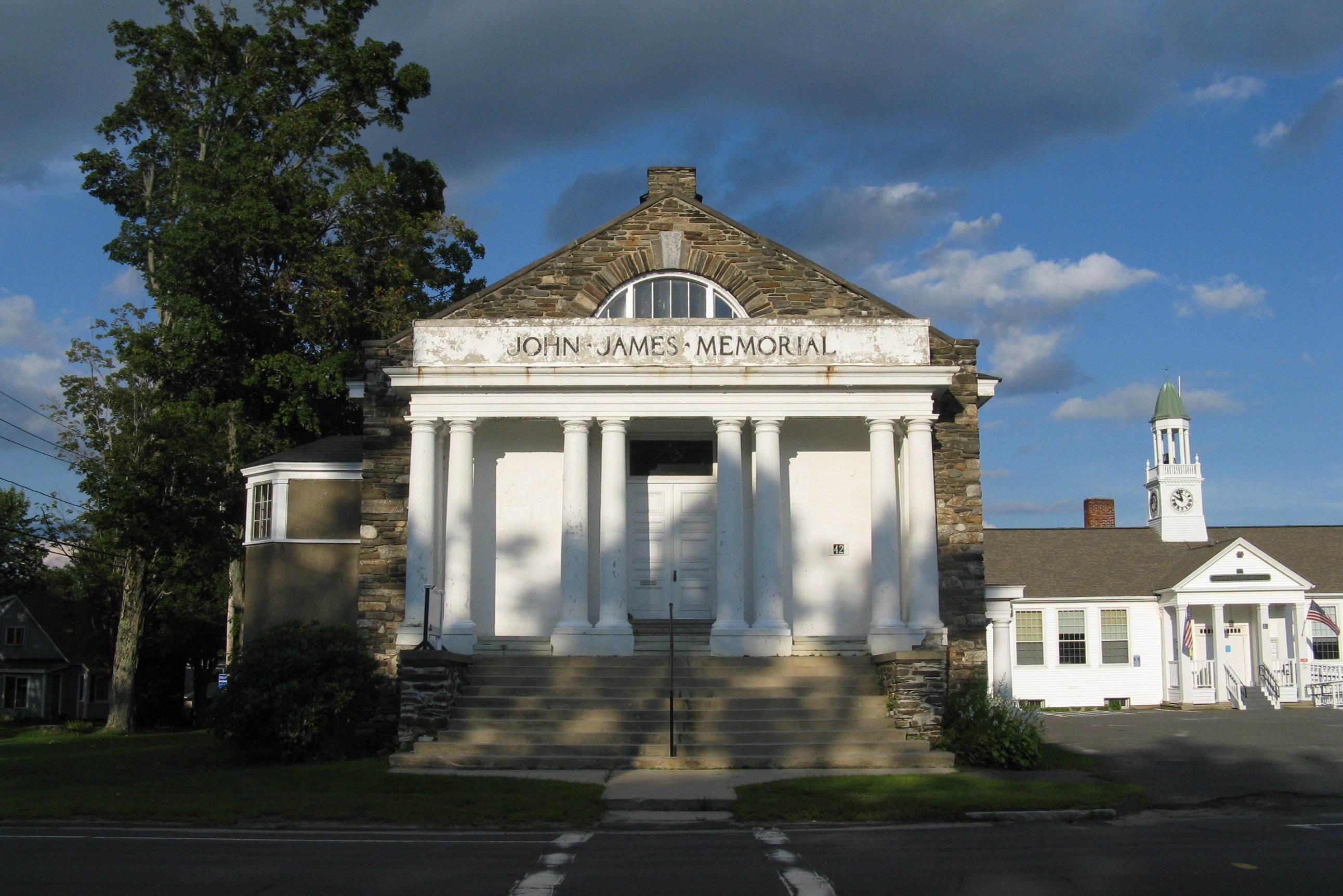

- Location within Massachusetts Location within the United States
- Location: 42 Main St., Goshen, Massachusetts
- Coordinates: 42°26′29″N 72°48′0″W
- Area: less than one acre
- Built: 1911
- Architect: William J. Howes
- Architectural style: Classical Revival
- NRHP reference No.: 100002829
- Added to NRHP: August 28, 2018

Goshen Town Hall is the historic civic heart of the town of Goshen, Massachusetts. Located at 42 Main Street in the village center, it is a fine example of Classical Revival architecture, built out of locally quarried fieldstone. The building, which now houses a meeting space and the town library, was listed on the National Register of Historic Places in 2018.

== Description and history ==
Goshen Town Hall is located in the town's main village center on the east side of Main Street (Massachusetts Route 9) at its junction with East Street. It is a two-story masonry building, with a gabled roof. The front facade is dominated by four paired sets of round Tuscan columns, set beneath an entablature. and an eyebrow window in the stone wall behind. The main entrance is in the central bay, accessed by a broad series of steps. The building appears to be only one story in height, because the first floor is actually partially below grade. The interior is arranged with an auditorium on the lower level, and a kitchen, dining room, and the library on the upper level.

Prior to construction of this building, Goshen held its town meetings in a variety of places, most recently in a local hotel (no longer standing) across the street from this building. This building was designed by William J. Howes, and completed in 1911. One of the largest donors to its construction was the will of John James, and it was named in his honor. It was the first permanent home for the town library, which had existed in some form since the late 18th century. The building has also fulfilled another objective in its construction, serving as a major meeting for local civic and social events.

== See also ==
- National Register of Historic Places listings in Hampshire County, Massachusetts
