= Mountain Rest =

Historic house in Massachusetts, United States

- U.S. National Register of Historic Places
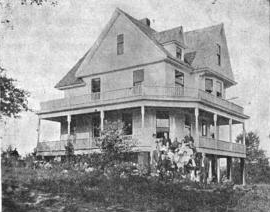
- The retreat's Avery Cottage, c. 1910

- Location within Massachusetts Location within the United States
- Location: Goshen, Massachusetts
- Coordinates: 42°27′36″N 72°50′23″W
- Area: 32.77 acres (13.26 ha)
- Built: 1902
- Architect: Henry Hathaway & Sons
- NRHP reference No.: 83003984
- Added to NRHP: November 10, 1983

Mountain Rest is a historic religious summer retreat on Wildwood Lane, off Spruce Corner Road in Goshen, Massachusetts. Built in the first decade of the 20th century, it served as a retreat for Christian missionaries to foreign countries during periods of furlough in the United States, and as a training facility for future missionaries. The camp was listed on the National Register of Historic Places in 1983. The camp closed in 1970, and in 1987 the complex was converted to condominiums.

== Description and history ==
Mountain Rest is located in the northwest part of Goshen, a rural community in the central eastern Berkshires. It is a cluster of buildings on Wildwood Road, formerly the camp's access road, north of Massachusetts Route 9 off Spruce Corner Road. The camp has seven buildings, all of wood-frame construction, organized around the drive, which ends in a loop around which most of the buildings are arranged. The largest of the buildings is Scudder Hall, a two-story building constructed in 1902 as a dormitory, which served as the focal point of the community. The most architecturally sophisticated is Avery Cottage, a four-story multi-gabled structure with Victorian stylistic elements.

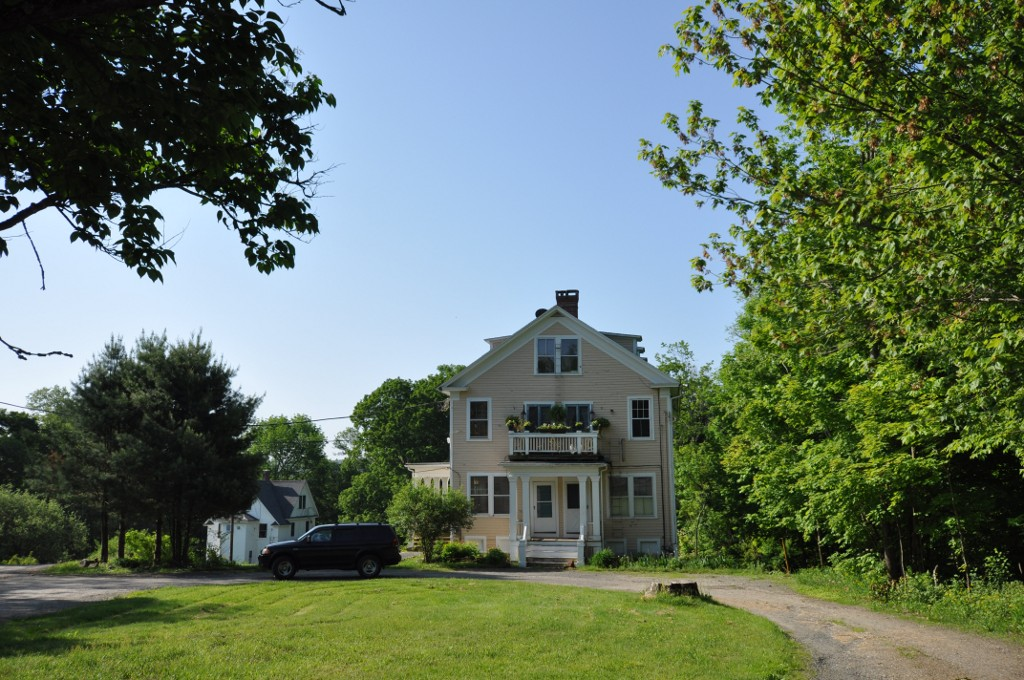

The camp was established in 1902 by Dr. George Dowkontt, a leading missionary physician and founder of the New York Medical Missionary Society. It was established on land donated by Alvan Barrus, a state senator. The purpose of the camp was to provide a retreat for missionaries and their families while in between assignments, and to provide for the exchange of formal and practical knowledge associated with missionary activities. Notable attendees of the camp included Dr. William Wanless and Dr. Ida Scudder, for whom Scudder Hall was named. Ronald and Lillian Brook, Presbyterian fraternal workers to Cameroon, West Africa, also brought their family to Mountain Rest during furloughs (1950s-60s). Their children were Kathleen, Norma, Larry, Bill, Paul, Sarah, and Joy. Early in 2000 Kathleen and her husband Bill Kelly "found" Mountain Rest after asking a local fireman where it might be. In 2008 Larry and his wife Juanita and daughter Joanna visited and discovered that all of the missionary facilities and been turned into private housing. Scudder Hall had been partitioned into condos. The camp had operated until 1970, by which time the scale of American missionary activity had been greatly reduced. Hence, the need financially, to close it down and rent out the various buildings.

== See also ==
- National Register of Historic Places listings in Hampshire County, Massachusetts
