= Parsons, Shepherd, and Damon Houses Historic District =

Historic district in Massachusetts, United States

- Parsons, Shepherd, and Damon Parsons Houses Historic District
- U.S. National Register of Historic Places
- U.S. Historic district
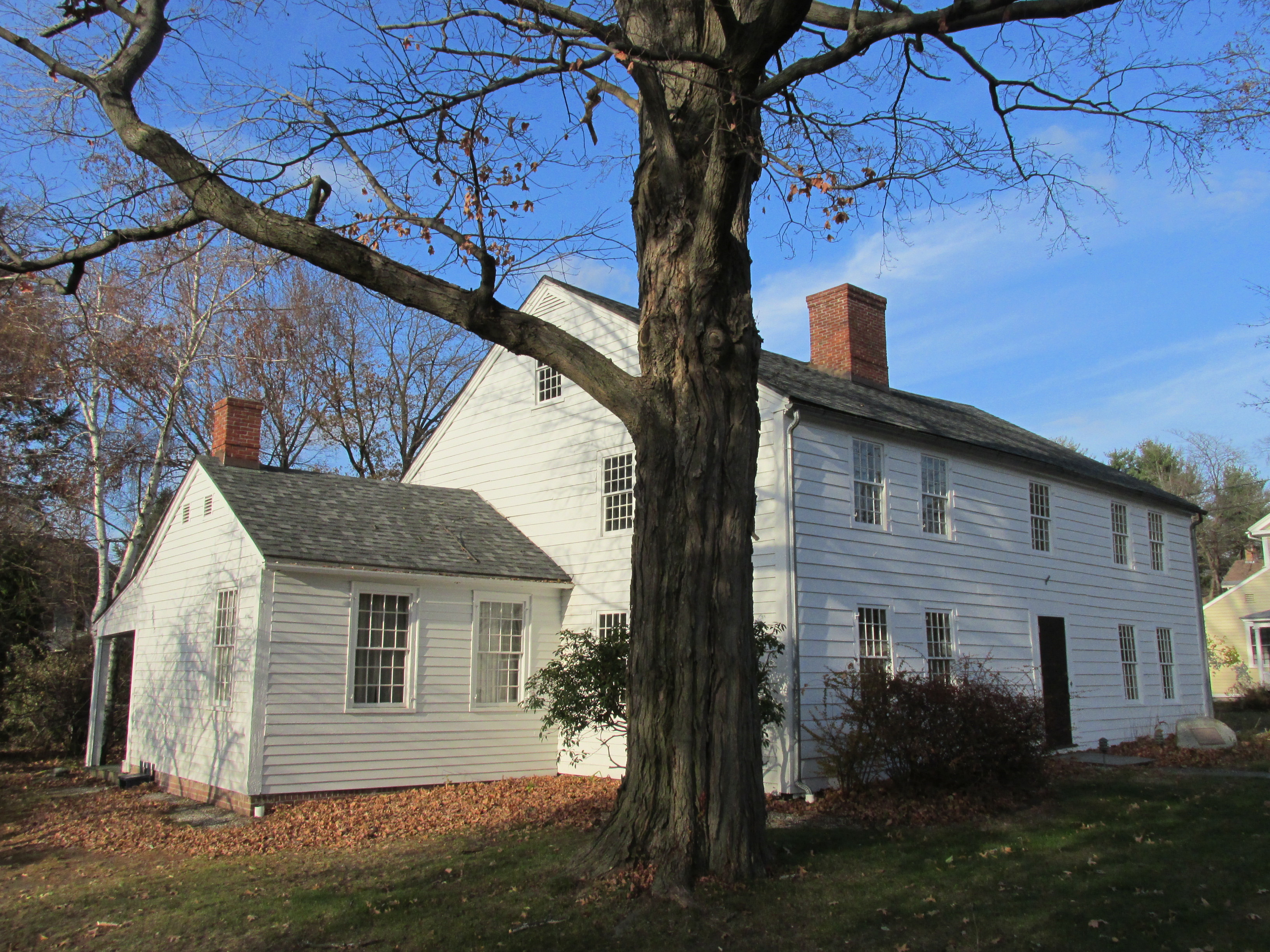
- 1719 Parsons House

- Location within Massachusetts Location within the United States
- Location: 46–66 Bridge St., Northampton, Massachusetts
- Coordinates: 42°19′20″N 72°37′35″W
- Area: 2.5 acres (1.0 ha)
- Architect: Isaac Damon
- NRHP reference No.: 01000627
- Added to NRHP: June 6, 2001

The Parsons, Shepherd, and Damon Houses Historic District is a historic district on the east side of downtown Northampton, Massachusetts encompassing a 2.5-acre (1.0 ha) property that was first laid out in 1654. Now owned by Historic Northampton, the property includes three houses built between 1730 and 1830. The district was added to the National Register of Historic Places in 2001.

== Description ==
The core of the Nathaniel Parsons House, 58 Bridge Street, was built c. 1719, and still exhibits characteristics of First Period construction. The building was extensively modified and added on during the Federal period between 1795 and 1815, and wings were added between 1815 and 1830. Modifications thereafter were comparatively modest.

The Shepherd House, 66 Bridge Street, was built in 1795, and remains a fine example of Federalist architecture with later stylistic modifications. It received Greek Revival detailing when that style was fashionable in the mid-19th century, and a Colonial Revival porch c. 1900.

The Isaac Damon House, 46 Bridge Street, was built c. 1813, and its main block is a typical five-bay two story Federalist. The building includes a series of additions on its rear, including one whose construction suggests it was originally attached to a different building. The house was acquired by Historic Northampton from the Damon family.

== History and significance ==
Northampton was settled in the 17th century, and was by the late 18th century a major regional center in the Connecticut River valley. These three houses stand near the junction of Main and Bridge Street, on some of the earliest plots laid out. The Parsons House stands on land granted in 1654 to Cornet Joseph Parsons, who oversaw the early growth of the town on behalf of John Pynchon. The Damon House was built by Isaac Damon, one of the area's most important proponents of the Federal style of architecture; his influence, and that of Asher Benjamin, had a major influence on the architecture of the area and the time.

== See also ==
- National Register of Historic Places listings in Hampshire County, Massachusetts
