= Cushman Village Historic District =

Historic district in Massachusetts, United States

- U.S. National Register of Historic Places
- U.S. Historic district
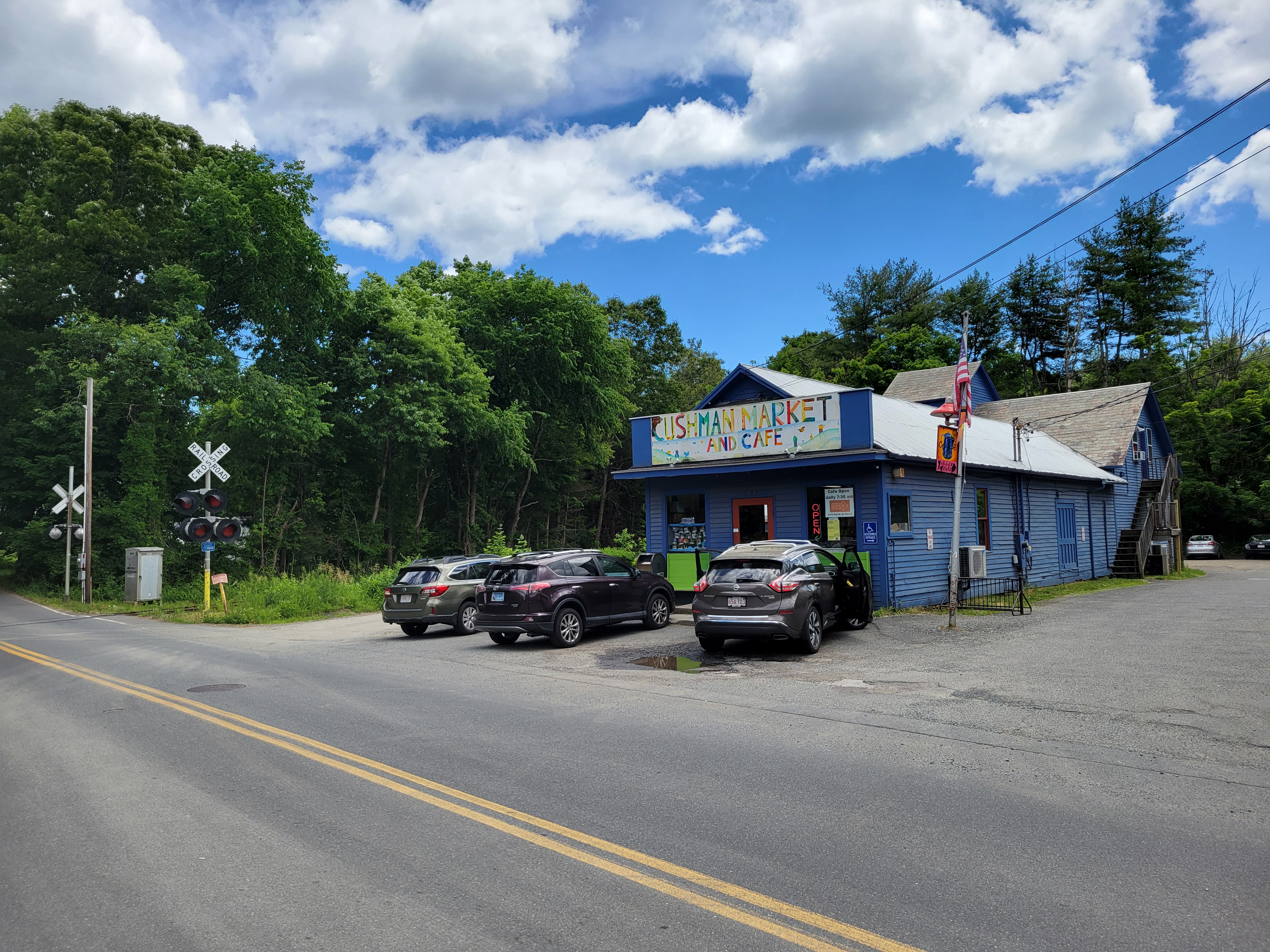
- Cushman Market and Cafe

- Location within Massachusetts Location within the United States
- Location: Amherst, Massachusetts
- Coordinates: 42°25′3″N 72°30′26″W
- Area: 86 acres (35 ha)
- Architectural style: Greek Revival, Gothic, Georgian
- NRHP reference No.: 92001553
- Added to NRHP: November 5, 1992

The Cushman Village Historic District is a historic district encompassing a portion of the Cushman Village area of Amherst, Massachusetts, which was a significant mill village during the 19th century. It is centered on the triangle formed by Bridge, Henry, and Pine Streets in northeastern Amherst, and arose because of the presence of falls on the Mill River, whose water power was harnessed for mills as early as the mid-18th century. Two houses survive from the colonial period. The village, although it was defined for many years by the (mainly wood-frame) mills, no longer has any industrial buildings, as they were demolished or destroyed by fire. Most of the houses in the district were built before 1860, the peak of the village's industrial activity. The district was listed on the National Register of Historic Places in 1992.

== Description and history ==
Cushman Village is located in northeastern Amherst, in an area where the plains of the Connecticut River to the west give way to hillier terrain. The Mill River runs roughly westward in this area to the north of the village, before turning south and eventually emptying into the Connecticut. In 1738 Nathaniel Kellogg was granted water rights to establish a grist mill on the Mill River's "great falls"; in 1746 he added a lumber mill further downstream. By the late 18th century there were at least six mills of various types operating on the river, and there were clusters of mill-related worker housing nearby. The oldest surviving house was built sometime before 1759, and now stands at 24 Leverett Road.

Small textile mills were built on the river in the first half of the 19th century, but most were either destroyed by fire, or were replaced by later construction. The arrival of the railroad and the establishment of a depot (no longer extant), helped give a center to the growing village. Between about 1835 and 1930 mills established by the Cushman brothers came to dominate the local economic landscape. It was during the mid-19th century that most of the village's housing stock was built. Although not always built by the mill owners, the Cushmans owned a great deal of the local housing stock by the 1870s. Much of it was in relatively conservative architectural styles, with a large amount of Greek Revival construction persisting into the 1880s, even while modest versions of Italianate, Second Empire, and Queen Anne Victorians were also being built. The house at 131 Bridge Street is a mill owner's residence, and is one of the village's more elaborate expressions of the Greek Revival.

== See also ==
- National Register of Historic Places listings in Hampshire County, Massachusetts
