= Southampton Center Historic District =

Historic district in Massachusetts, United States

- U.S. National Register of Historic Places
- U.S. Historic district
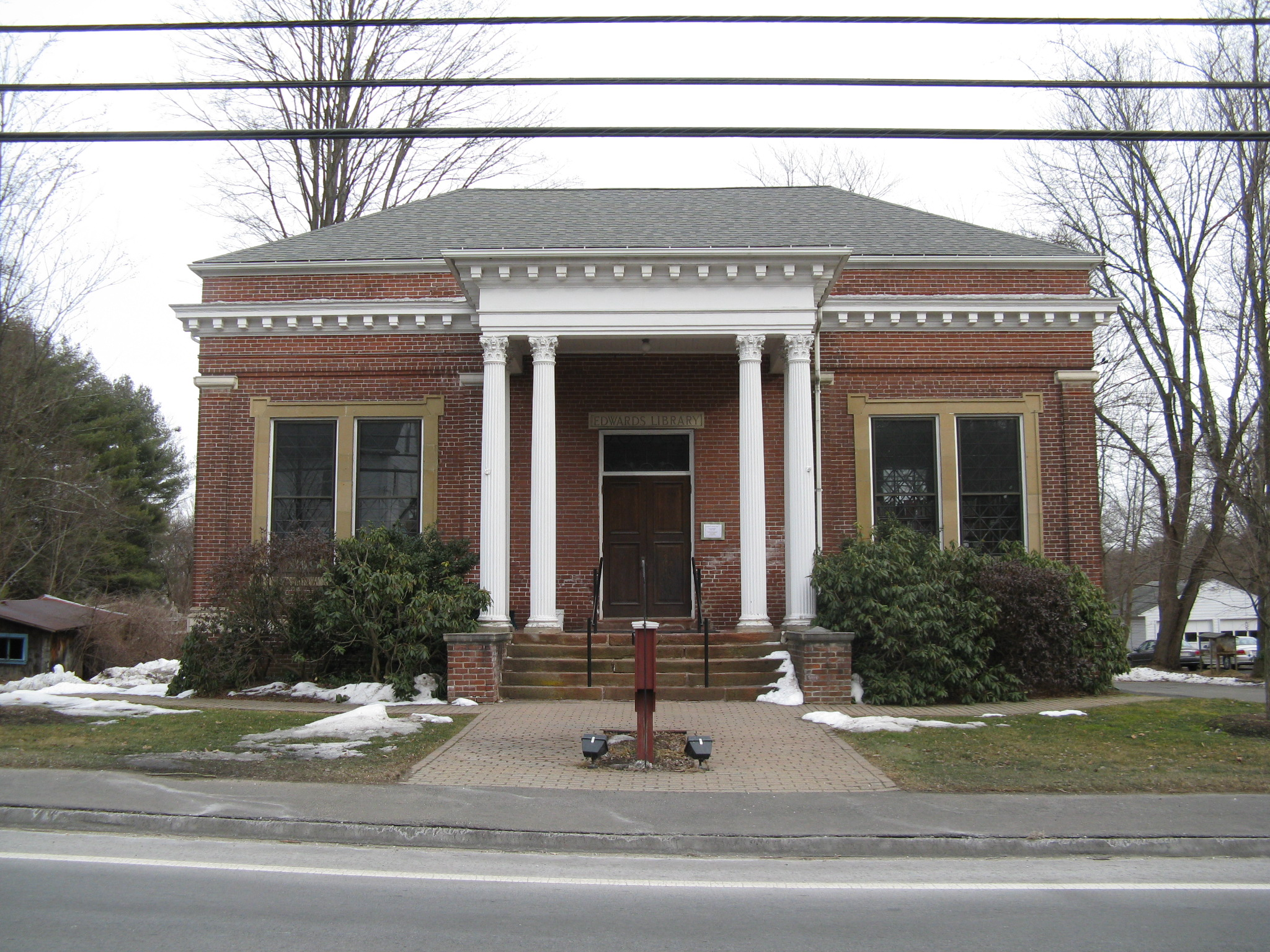
- Edwards Library

- Location within Massachusetts Location within the United States
- Location: Southampton, Massachusetts
- Coordinates: 42°13′25″N 72°43′55″W
- Area: 155 acres (63 ha)
- Architect: Multiple
- Architectural style: Mid 19th Century Revival, Georgian, Federal
- NRHP reference No.: 91000363
- Added to NRHP: April 4, 1991

The Southampton Center Historic District encompasses the densely built center of the otherwise predominantly rural town of Southampton, Massachusetts. The district extends from Fomer Road in the south, along High Street and College Highway (Massachusetts Route 10) to Maple Street, and includes a line of houses along East Street from College to Elm. This area is the historic heart of the town, being first laid out in the 1730s. The district includes, in addition to a number of 18th- and 19th-century residences, the town's only church, the town hall, and the old public library. The district was listed on the National Register of Historic Places in 1991.

== Description and history ==
The area that is now Southampton was originally incorporated as part of Northampton 1654, but was not formally settled until 1730. It was separately incorporated in 1775. The plan for the town center was drawn in 1730, and has been relatively unchanged since then, with a broadly spaced grid of roads between College Highway and High Street. The town grew significantly after 1790, resulting in a range of high-quality Federal period residences, and the present Congregational Church, built in 1788 on or near the site of the town's first colonial meeting house. In addition to civic functions, the center served as the economic hub of the largely agrarian community. The town's economy suffered in the late 19th century, its agriculture from competition with larger midwestern farms, and its industry from the cooption of its waterways for use as public water supplies. There has been little significant development in the center since the early 20th century.

== See also ==
- Lockville Historic District
- National Register of Historic Places listings in Hampshire County, Massachusetts
