= Ireland Street Cemetery =

Historic cemetery in Hampshire County, Massachusetts, US

- U.S. National Register of Historic Places
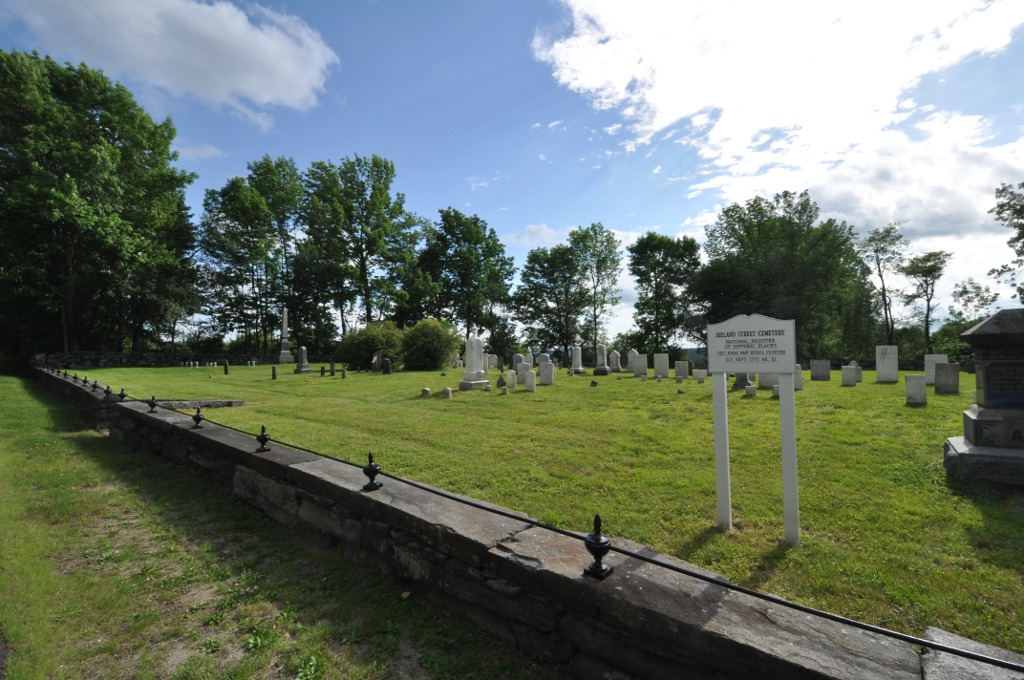
- Ireland Street Cemetery in 2014

- Location within Massachusetts Location within the United States
- Location: Chesterfield, Massachusetts
- Coordinates: 42°21′54″N 72°53′3″W
- NRHP reference No.: 09000471
- Added to NRHP: July 1, 2009

The Ireland Street Cemetery is a historic cemetery on Ireland Street in West Chesterfield, Massachusetts. The cemetery contains 185 stones, dating from 1772 to 1996, most of which date to the 18th and 19th centuries. It is one of the town's oldest cemeteries, and contains the work of three significant funerary carvers of the late 18th and 19th centuries. The cemetery was listed on the National Register of Historic Places in 2009.

== Description and history ==
The Ireland Street Cemetery is in southwestern Chesterfield, on a rise above the Westfield River which flows north-south to the east of Ireland Street, the town's major north-south route on its west side, and one of its oldest roadways. The approximately 1-acre (0.40 ha) plot lies on the west side of Ireland Street, surrounded by fields and orchards. The plot is demarcated by stone walls, the eastern one also acting as a retaining wall, because the plot is raised above the road. This wall is made of random fieldstones topped by several courses of flat stones and capped by a course of quarried granite. These are topped by urn-shaped fenceposts connected by a single iron rail. The entrance is in the center of the wall. Burials are arrayed in rows, oriented to face east.

The cemetery was probably established sometime in the early 1770s, after the first white settlers arrived in the area in the 1760s. It is probably the town's second cemetery, after the Center Cemetery (1764), although documentary evidence is lacking. The oldest stone, dating 1772, was for Mrs. Mary Sylvester. It is possible that it was established first as a Sylvester family cemetery, as it was located on land belonging to that family. Many of the early burials were of people with Irish ancestry, who were involved in the founding of the town. Most of the burials in the cemetery took place before 1820, the height of Chesterfield's population, which declined until c. 1970.

The oldest stones in the cemetery have been positively identified as the works of two well-known itinerant funerary carvers, Joseph and Elijah Sikes, a father and son who were active in the region through about 1820. Elijah Sikes was born c. 1772, indicating that the earliest stones were likely the work of his father. Stones carved in the mid-19th century, after Elijah's departure from the region, bear stylistically resemblance to his work, indicating that subsequent carvers, including Elijah Phelps, were influenced by his work. Several stones have been attributed in groups to other unnamed carvers.

== See also ==
- National Register of Historic Places listings in Hampshire County, Massachusetts
