= South Amherst Common Historic District =

Historic district in Massachusetts, United States

- U.S. National Register of Historic Places
- U.S. Historic district
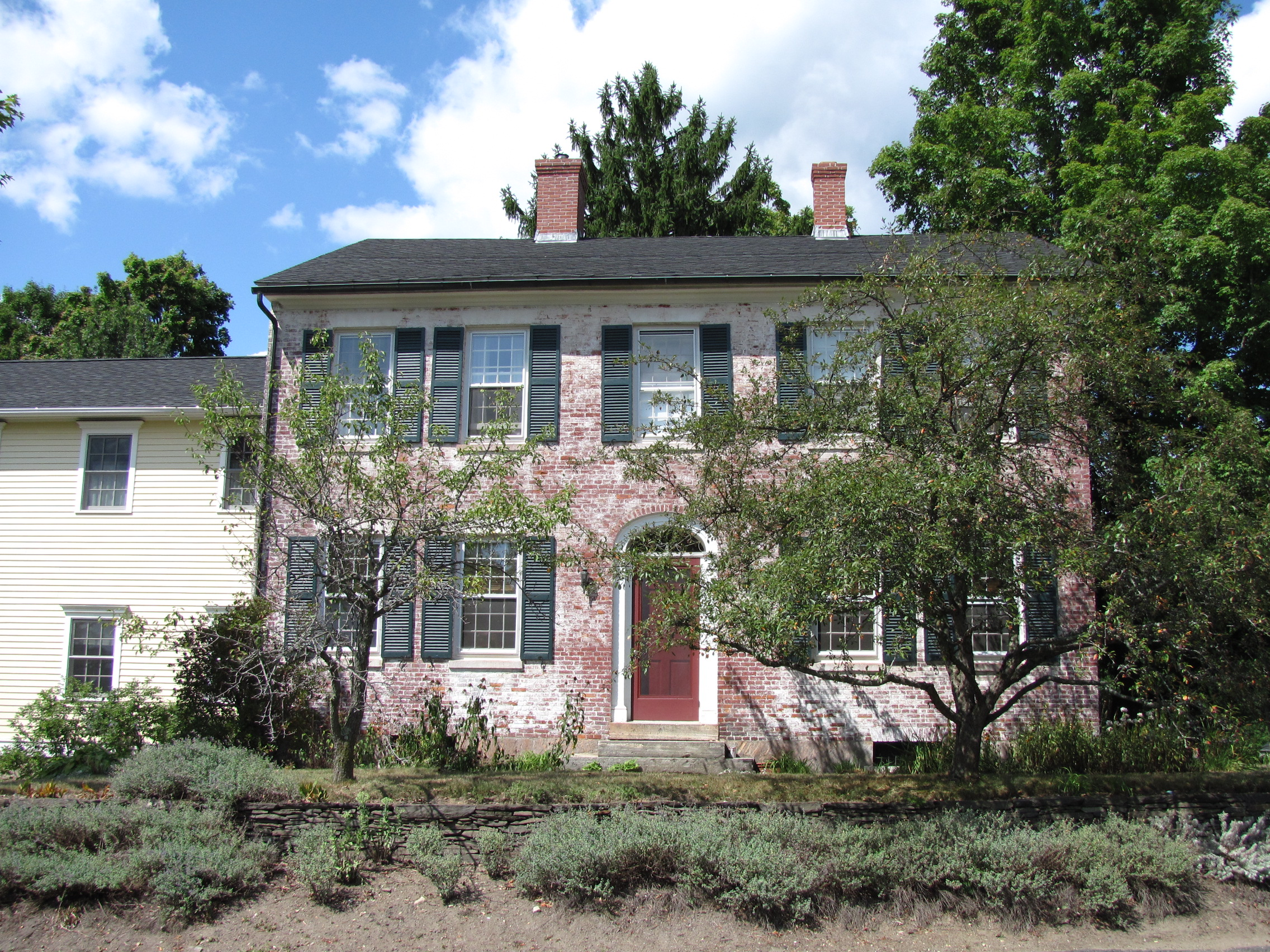
- 324 Pomeroy Lane

- Location within Massachusetts Location within the United States
- Location: 445 Shays Street, South Amherst Common, 979—1081 S. East Street and 324 Pomeroy Lane, Amherst, Massachusetts
- Coordinates: 42°20′29″N 72°30′18″W
- Area: 13 acres (5.3 ha)
- Built: 1788
- Architect: Putnam, Karl S.; Gos, Philip L., & George Nutting
- Architectural style: Georgian, Federal, Greek Revival
- NRHP reference No.: 95000100
- Added to NRHP: February 17, 1995

The South Amherst Common Historic District encompasses the village common and surrounding buildings of South Amherst, Massachusetts. This area developed as a rural residential village hub in the 18th and 19th centuries. It was listed on the National Register of Historic Places in 1995.

== Description and history ==
The town of Amherst was settled as part of Hadley in the early 18th century, and was separately incorporated in 1759. The South Amherst Common, also known as Fiddlers Green, was formed out of a road junction created in 1760 by laying out the southern portion of what is now South East Street, the northern portion and Middle Street having been laid out in 1703. The first house known to be built facing what is now the common was built about 1742 by Nathaniel Coleman, and still stands at 1055 South East Street, at the south end of the common; a second 18th century house, the Jonathan Dickinson House, dates from around 1750 and faces the common from the southwest at 445 Shays Street. In 1788 the town reduced the rights of way for its roads, and sold off the excess land, but keeping the area that is now South Amherst Common. Over the next 150 years, the common became a local nexus for the surrounding rural community, with a school (first one built in 1764) and church (1825), and several cottage industries. Station Road was built extending eastward from the common in 1821, and Pomeroy Lane to its west in 1825. The area has remained rural with increasing suburbanization since then.

The common today consists of a roughly triangular area bounded by South East Street on all sides. Shays Street, Pomeroy Lane and Middle Street terminate into South East Street at the southwest side of the common. This triangular area is further cut by cross roads into a total of five different areas. The common itself is a grassy area unadorned by monuments and dotted with trees. Facing the common are primarily residences of 19th-century wood-frame construction, with a few instances of 18th and 20th-century buildings. One brick residence, the Enos Dickinson House, which was built in 1825 and for a time housed a post office, stands at 324 Pomeroy Lane with its eastern side facing the common, and there are four non-contributing but sympathetically styled 1950s Capes that also face the common. Prominent non-residential buildings are the 1825 Congregational Church, the 1902 South Amherst School, and the 1930 Munson Memorial Library and Community Center.

== See also ==
- National Register of Historic Places listings in Hampshire County, Massachusetts
