= Prospect-Gaylord Historic District =

Historic district in Massachusetts, United States

- U.S. National Register of Historic Places
- U.S. Historic district
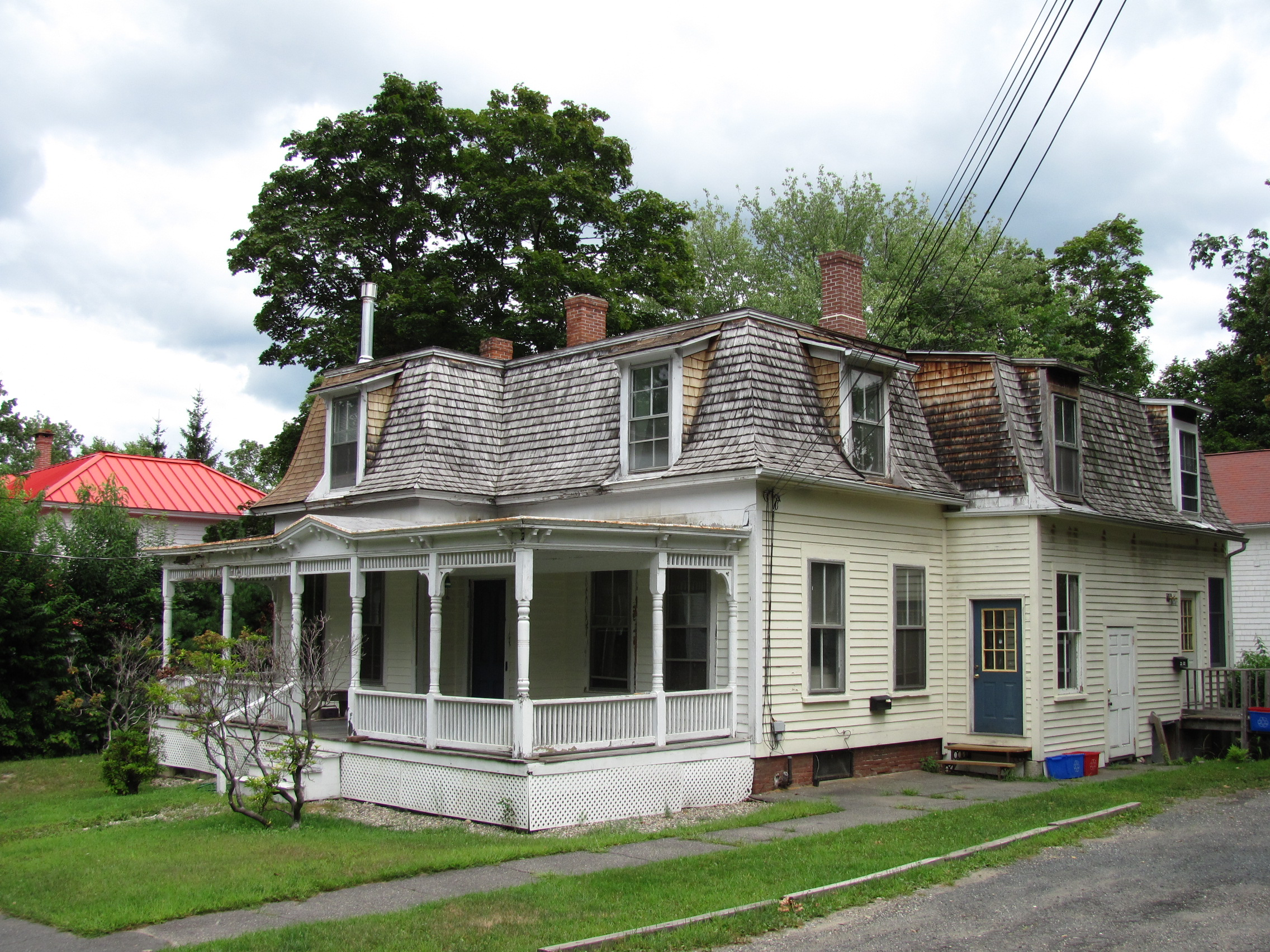
- A house on North Prospect Street

- Location within Massachusetts Location within the United States
- Location: Amherst, Massachusetts
- Coordinates: 42°22′33″N 72°31′22″W
- Area: 16.8 acres (6.8 ha)
- Architect: Howland, Warren S.
- Architectural style: Colonial Revival, Greek Revival, Italianate
- NRHP reference No.: 93000007
- Added to NRHP: February 4, 1993

The Prospect—Gaylord Historic District is a historic district encompassing a residential area built up mostly in the late 19th century just outside the central business district of Amherst, Massachusetts. Contributing properties include most of the houses on Prospect Street, which parallels Pleasant Street, as well as properties on Gaylord and Amity Streets running west from Prospect. These houses are generally in late Victorian styles such as Queen Anne, although some, for example a workman's house at 24 Gaylord Street, are in a more vernacular style. A central element of the district is the Hope Community Church, a historically African American church built in 1912 for a congregation whose history dates to 1869. Funds for its construction were raised in part through the efforts of W.E.B. Du Bois. The district was listed on the National Register of Historic Places in 1993.

Amherst, settled in the 17th century, remained a scattered agricultural community until the early 19th century. At that time, the town center began to take on a more pronounced commercial character, and its importance in the town was cemented by the establishment of Amherst College in 1825. Prospect Street was laid out in 1824 between Amity Street (1703) and Northampton Street, the original main road to the Connecticut River. This area was built up with modest Greek Revival houses set on small lots, while North Prospect Street, north of Amity Street, was developed later, with larger lots and more typical Victorian styling. Gaylord Street was laid out as a private lane in the early 1880s, and was subsequently lined with Queen Anne and later styles of housing.

== See also ==
- National Register of Historic Places listings in Hampshire County, Massachusetts
