= List of United States post offices in Massachusetts =

United States post offices operate under the authority of the United States Post Office Department (1792–1971) or the United States Postal Service (since 1971). Historically, post offices were usually placed in a prominent location. Many were architecturally distinctive, including notable buildings featuring Beaux-Arts, Art Deco, and Vernacular architecture. However, modern U.S. post offices were generally designed for functionality rather than architectural style.

Following is a list of United States post offices in Massachusetts. Notable post offices include individual buildings, whether still in service or not, which have architectural, historical, or community-related significance. Many of these are listed on the National Register of Historic Places (NRHP) or state and local historic registers.

| Post office | City | Date built | Image | Architect | Notes | Ref. |
|---|---|---|---|---|---|---|
| United States Post Office (Arlington, Massachusetts) | Arlington | 1935 | | Maurice P. Meade | (Note: Listed on the National Register of Historic Places) | |
| Old Attleboro Post Office | Attleboro | 1916 | | James A. Wetmore | (Note: No longer used as a post office.) | |
| Santuit Post Office | Barnstable | 1846 | | unknown | | |
| United States Post Office (Beverly, Massachusetts) | Beverly | 1910 | | James Knox Taylor | | |
| Boston Post Office and Courthouse, now John W. McCormack Post Office and Courthouse | Boston | 1931–1933 | | James A. Wetmore, Ralph Adams Cram, Cram and Ferguson Architects | | |
| Old Post Office Building (Brockton, Massachusetts) | Brockton | 1898 | | James Knox Taylor | | |
| U.S. Post Office-Central Square, now Clifton Merriman Post Office Building | Cambridge | 1933 | | James D. Leland & Co.; John Baven Co., Inc. | | |
| United States Post Office (Deerfield, Massachusetts) | Deerfield | 1912, 1952 | | James Knox Taylor, Henry N. Flynt | | |
| United States Post Office–Easthampton Main | Easthampton | 1933 | | James A. Wetmore | | |
| United States Post Office–Great Barrington Main | Great Barrington | 1935–1936 | | Louis A. Simon, Lorimer Rich | | |
| United States Post Office–Greenfield Main | Greenfield | 1915, 1939 | | Oscar Wenderoth, Louis A. Simon | | |
| United States Post Office–Holyoke Main | Holyoke | 1934 | | Louis A. Simon, George O. Von Nerta, Thomas M. James Co., James P. B. Alderman Co. | | |
| United States Post Office–Lexington Main | Lexington | 1937 | | Louis A. Simon | | |
| Lowell Post Office | Lowell | 1895 | | Willoughby J. Edbrooke | | |
| Thomas P. Costin Jr. Post Office Building | Lynn | 1933 | | Edward H. Hoyt and Associates, James A. Whetmore | | |
| Old Post Office Building (Lynn, Massachusetts) | Lynn | 1896 | | unknown | | |
| United States Post Office–Medford Main | Medford | 1937 | | Louis A. Simon, Neal A. Melick | | |
| United States Post Office–Middleborough Main | Middleborough | 1933 | | James A. Wetmore | | |
| United States Post Office–Millbury Main | Millbury | 1940 | | Louis A. Simon, Neal A. Melick | | |
| United States Post Office–Milton Main | Milton | 1936 | | Louis A. Simon, Neal A. Melick | | |
| United States Post Office–Newburyport Main | Newburyport | 1927–1928 | | James A. Wetmore | | |
| United States Post Office–Palmer Main | Palmer | 1931 | | Louis A. Simon | | |
| Plymouth Post Office Building | Plymouth | 1914–1915 | | Oscar Wenderoth | | |
| United States Post Office (Provincetown, Massachusetts) | Provincetown | 1930 | | James A. Wetmore | | |
| United States Post Office–Quincy Main | Quincy | 1909 | | James Knox Taylor | | |
| United States Post Office–Salem Main | Salem | 1932 | | Philip Horton Smith | | |
| United States Post Office–Somerville Main | Somerville | 1934–1935 | | Louis A. Simon | | |
| United States Post Office Garage | South Boston | 1941 | | Gilbert Stanley Underwood | (Note: The building was demolished.) | |
| United States Post Office–South Hadley Main | South Hadley | 1935 | | Leon Pernice | | |
| United States Post Office–Taunton Main | Taunton | 1930 | | James A. Wetmore | | |
| United States Post Office–Wakefield Main | Wakefield | 1936 | | Edward M Bridge | | |
| United States Post Office–Waltham Main | Waltham | 1935 | | Wadsworth, Hubbard & Smith | | |
| United States Post Office–Weymouth Landing | Weymouth | 1940–1941 | | Louis A. Simon, T. W. Cunningham Inc. | | |
| United States Post Office–Whitinsville Main | Whitinsville | 1938 | | Louis A. Simon, Neal A. Melick | | |
| United States Post Office–Williamstown Main | Williamstown | 1932 | | James A. Wetmore | | |
| United States Post Office–Winchester Main | Winchester | 1927–1928 | | James A. Wetmore | | |
| United States Post Office–Woburn Center Station | Woburn | 1911 | | James Knox Taylor | | |
| U.S. Post Office and Courthouse, now Harold D. Donohue Federal Building and United States Courthouse | Worcester | 1930–1931 | | Louis A. Simon | | |
