= List of United States post office murals in Massachusetts =

Following is a list of United States post office murals created in Massachusetts between 1934 and 1943.

Location	Mural title	Image	Artist	Date	Notes	NRHP listed
Adams	Quakers and the Site of Adams		Helen Rubin Stoler	1940	destroyed during renovation	
Arlington	Purchase of Land and Modern Tilling of the Soil		William C. Palmer	1938		
Ashland	The Railroad Comes to Town		Saul Berman	1941	oil on canvas	
Boston East Boston Branch	Communication		Ralf E. Nickelson	1941	oil on canvas, four panels	
Boston Everett Branch	Mail for New England		Stephen Etnier	1940	oil on canvas	
Canton	Paul Revere – 1801		Ernst Fiene	1937		
Chestnut Hill	The Reverend John Elliot Preaching to the Indians	post office mural in Chestnut Hill, Massachusetts by William Abbott Cheever	William Abbott Cheever	1941		
Chicopee Falls	History of Chicopee Falls		Ernst Halberstadt	1938		
Concord	Battle of the Bridge		Charles Anton Kaeselau	1941		
Danvers	Return of Timothy Pickering to Reside in Danvers		Dunbar Beck	1939	oil on canvas	
Dedham	Early Rural Mail Delivery		W. Lester Stevens	1936		
Dedham	Early Rural School		W. Lester Stevens	1936		
East Walpole	Early Paper Making		George Kanelous	1941		
Falmouth	Recapture of Corn Schooner from British		Karl Oberteuffer	1943		1986
Holyoke	Captain Elizur Holyoke's Exploring Party on the Connecticut River		Ross Moffett	1936	oil on canvas	1986
Ipswich	Ipswich Tax Resistance		Saul Levine	1941		
Lexington	Paul Revere's Ride		Aiden Lassell Ripley	1940		
Lynn	Colonial and Contemporary Civic Culture		William Riseman	1936		1986
Lynn	Early and Modern Industries of Lynn		William Riseman	1936		1986
Medford	Golden Triangle of Trade		Henry Billings	1939		1986
Millbury	An Incident in the King Philip War – 1670		Joe Lasber	1941	mural was revived in 1991	1987
Milton	The Suffolk Resolves – Oppression and Revolt in the Colonies	post office mural in Milton, Massachusetts by Elizabeth Tracy	Elizabeth Tracy	1939		
Natick	John Eliot Speaks to the Natick Indians		Hollis Holbrook	1937	tempera	
Northampton	Work Religion and Education		Alfred Crimi	1940	oil on canvas; on display at the Hampshire County Courthouse	
Somerville	A Skirmish Between British and Colonists		Ross Moffett	1937		1986
South Hadley	Composite View of South Hadley		Saul Levine	1942	tempera	1986
Stoughton	A Massachusetts Countryside		Jean Watson	1940	Winner of the 48-State Mural Competition; on display at Stoughton Historic Society	
Revere	The First Store and Tavern		Ross Moffett	1939		
Rockport	Preparing Rockport Granite for Shipment		W. Lester Stevens	1939		
Wareham	Cranberry Pickers		Lewis Rubenstein	1940		
Weymouth	First landing at Weymouth		Guy Rene′ du Bois	1942		
