= PVPA =

PVPA may refer to:

- Pioneer Valley Performing Arts Charter Public School, in South Hadley, Massachusetts, United States
- Plant Variety Protection Act of 1970, US legislation
