= Old Post Office Building (Lynn, Massachusetts) =

- U.S. National Register of Historic Places
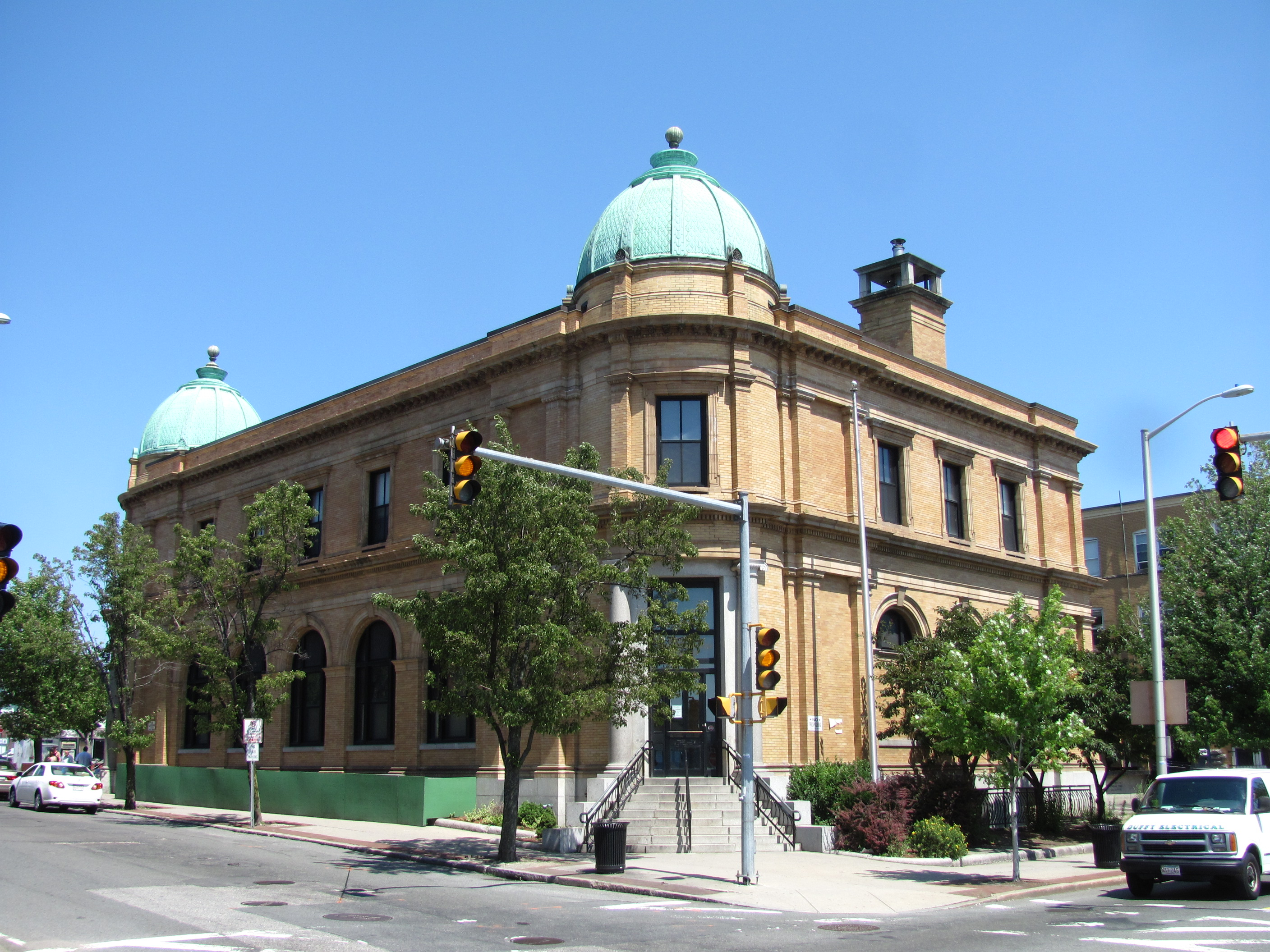

- Location within Massachusetts Location within the United States
- Location: 360 Washington Street, Lynn, Massachusetts
- Coordinates: 42°27′53″N 70°56′54″W
- Built: 1896
- Architectural style: Renaissance
- NRHP reference No.: 81000118
- Added to NRHP: September 14, 1981

The Old Post Office Building is a historic building in Lynn, Massachusetts. The two-story Colonial Revival building was built in 1897 to serve as the growing city's new post office. It is one of the city's best examples of Colonial Revival styling, and features distinctive copper sheathed domes. The building was expanded c. 1912 with a wing in the back, and replaced by the present post office in 1933. It has since been used principally as an office building.

The building was listed on the National Register of Historic Places in 1981.

== See also ==
- National Register of Historic Places listings in Lynn, Massachusetts
- National Register of Historic Places listings in Essex County, Massachusetts
- List of United States post offices
