= United States Post Office–Middleborough Main =

- US Post Office-Middleborough Main
- U.S. National Register of Historic Places
- U.S. Historic district – Contributing property
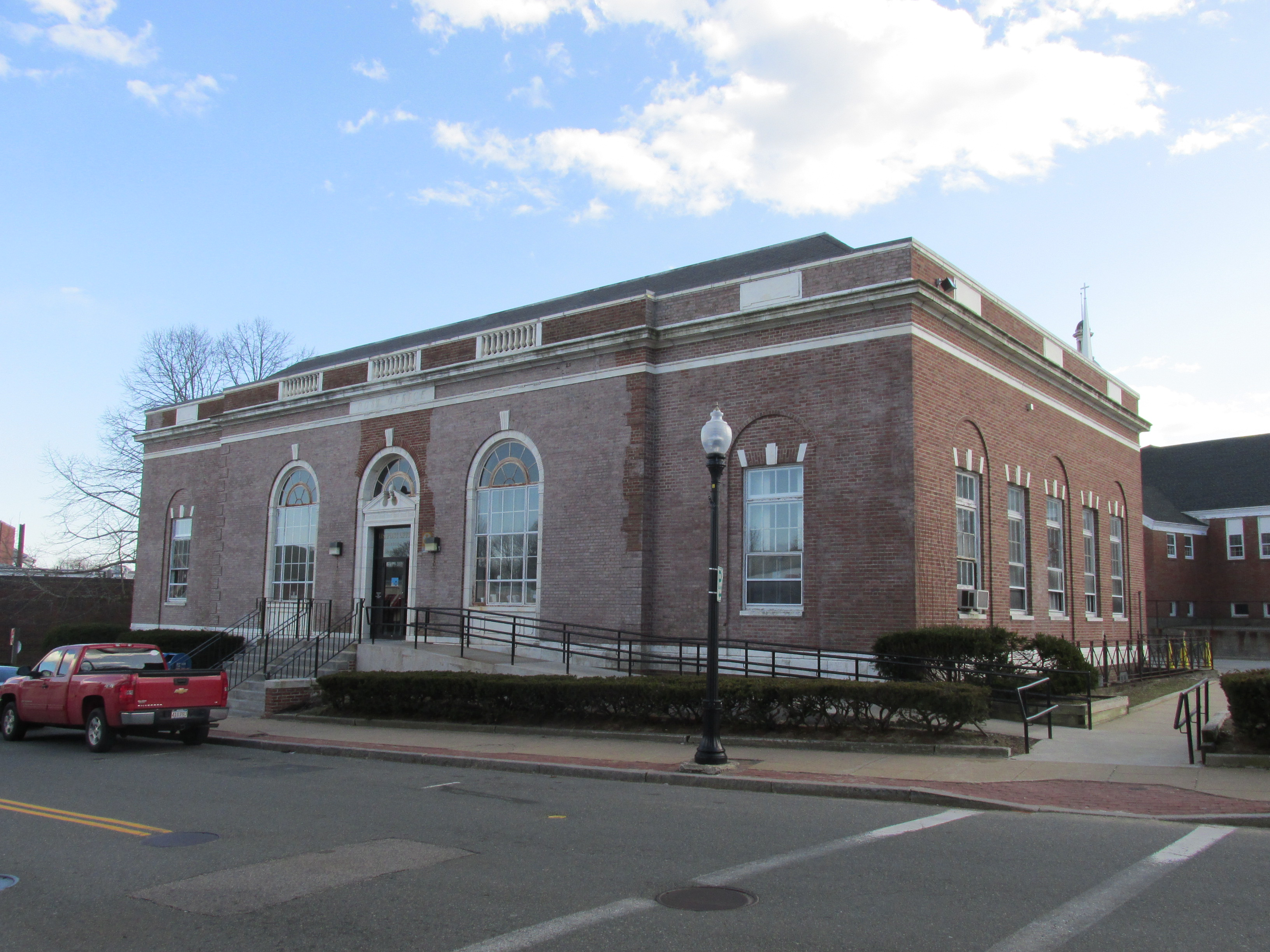
- Post Office

- Location within Massachusetts Location within the United States
- Location: 90 Center Street, Middleborough, Massachusetts
- Coordinates: 41°53′33″N 70°54′40″W
- Built: 1932
- Architect: Office of the Supervising Architect under James A. Wetmore; R.W. Smythe & Co.
- Architectural style: Late 19th And 20th Century Revivals, Classical Revival
- Part of: Middleborough Center Historic District (ID00000685)
- NRHP reference No.: 87001774

Significant dates
- Added to NRHP: October 19, 1987
- Designated CP: June 15, 2000

The Middleborough Main Post Office is a historic post office building in Middleborough, Massachusetts. The single-story brick and stone building was erected in 1933 as part of a Works Progress Administration jobs program. The building has a neo-classical style, with a projecting entry pavilion, and windows slightly recessed in round arch openings.

The building was listed on the National Register of Historic Places in 1987, and included in the Middleborough Center Historic District in 2000.

== See also ==
- National Register of Historic Places listings in Plymouth County, Massachusetts
- List of United States post offices
