= United States Post Office–Woburn Center Station =

- US Post Office-Woburn Center Station
- U.S. National Register of Historic Places
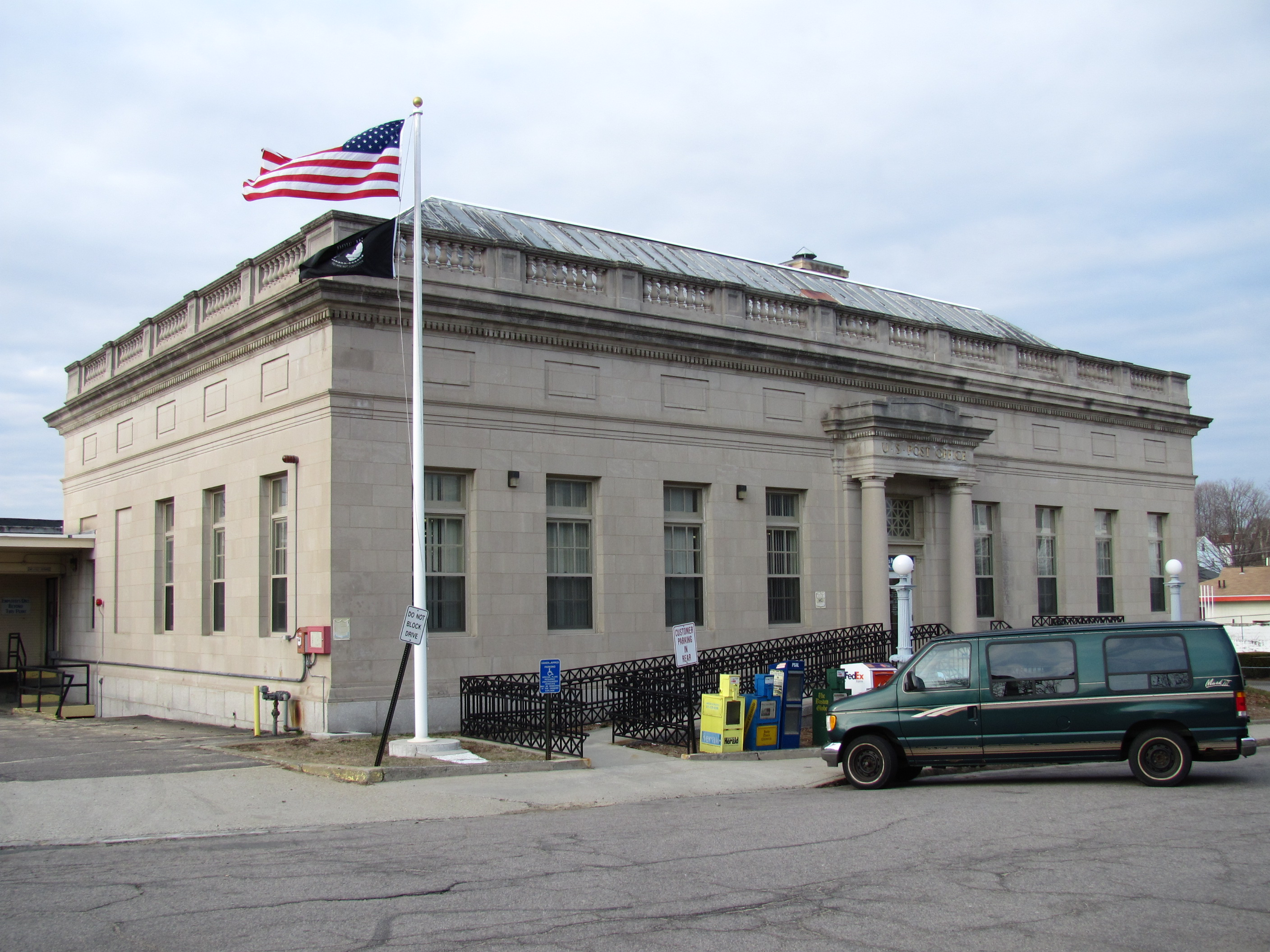
- US Post Office, Woburn

- Location within Massachusetts Location within the United States
- Location: Woburn, Massachusetts
- Coordinates: 42°28′53″N 71°4′9″W
- Built: 1912
- Architect: James Knox Taylor; Et al.
- Architectural style: Classical Revival
- NRHP reference No.: 86003436
- Added to NRHP: October 19, 1987

The US Post Office-Woburn Center Station is a historic post office building at 1 Abbott Street in Woburn, Massachusetts. The single story Classical Revival building was built out of sandstone in 1911. It is nine bays in width, with a central portico supported by Doric columns sheltering the main entrance. The building has a standing seam metal hip roof with a flat middle section. The cornice has dentil molding, with a parapet above.

The building was listed on the National Register of Historic Places in 1987.

== See also ==
- National Register of Historic Places listings in Middlesex County, Massachusetts
- List of United States post offices
