= United States Post Office–Williamstown Main =

- US Post Office–Williamstown Main
- U.S. National Register of Historic Places
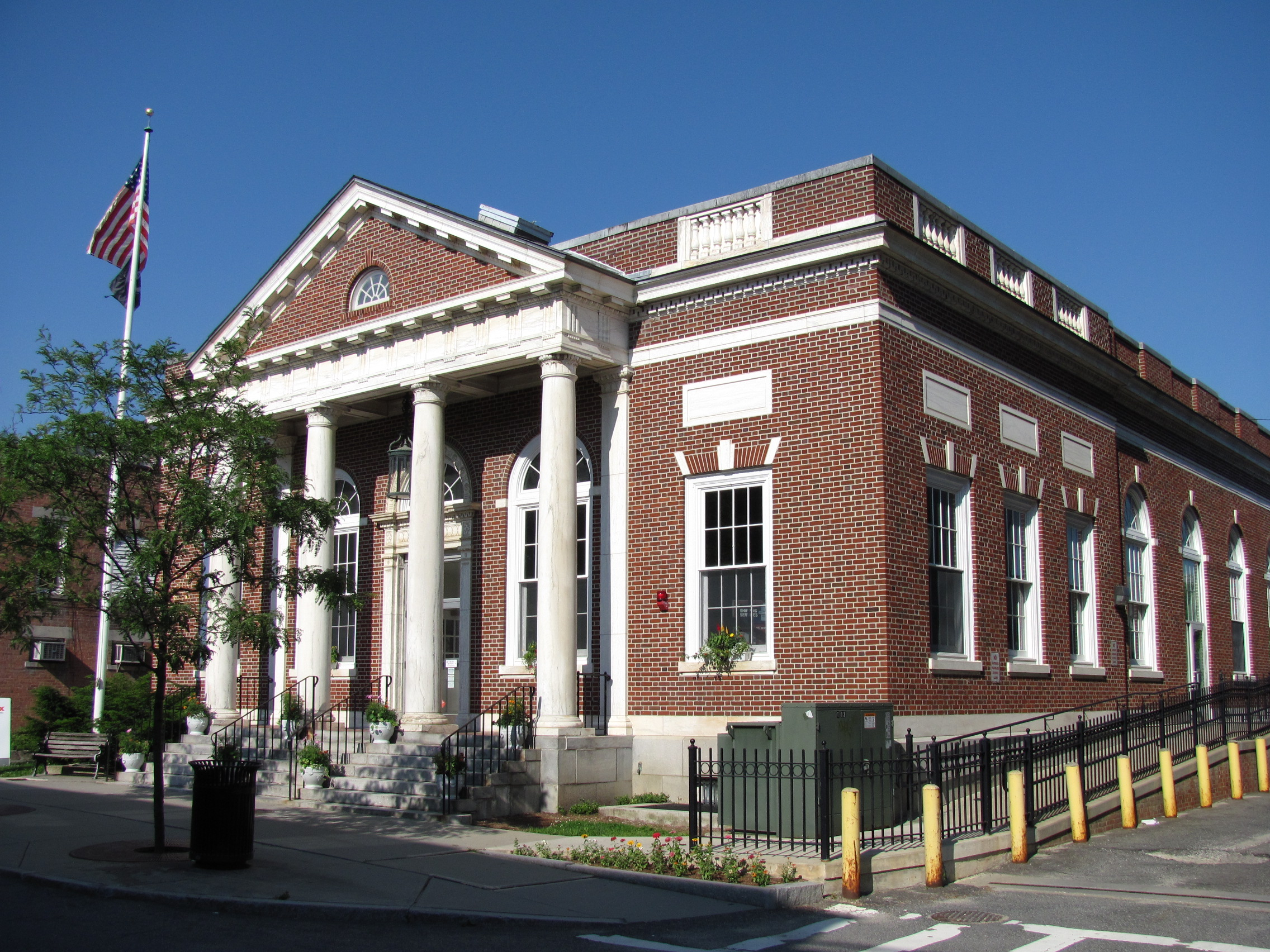
- US Post Office

- Location within Massachusetts Location within the United States
- Interactive map showing the location of the U.S Post Office-Williamstown Main
- Location: 56 Spring St. Williamstown, Massachusetts
- Coordinates: 42°42′38″N 73°12′14″W
- Area: less than one acre
- Built: 1932
- Architect: James A. Wetmore
- Architectural style: Classical Revival
- NRHP reference No.: 86002243
- Added to NRHP: July 17, 1986

US Post Office–Williamstown Main is a historic post office at 56 Spring Street in Williamstown, Massachusetts. Built in 1932, it is an architecturally significant local example of Classical Revival architecture. It was listed on the National Register of Historic Places in 1986.

== Description and history ==
The Williamstown Main Post Office is located in the town's central business district, on the east side Spring Street opposite Bank Street. The rectangular Neo-Classical building is made of Flemish bond brick on a granite foundation, and with marble detailing. Granite steps with wrought iron railings lead up to the main entrance, which is sheltered by a gabled portico supported by Tuscan columns. Windows are either set in round-arch openings, or in rectangular ones with splayed headers. The building is topped by a parapet alternating broad brick piers and sections of balustrade. In the lobby the floor is tiled quarry marble with marble strip details. The walls have a marble panel wainscoting that is topped by plaster. The principal modern intrusions are a glass and aluminum vestibule, and a handicap access ramp.

The post office was built by the federal government in 1932, during a period when the Postal Service was embarked in a construction program designed to provide jobs during the Great Depression. Prior to the construction of this building, the town's post office (established in 1798) was typically located in one of the town's commercial establishment. The building was designed by James Wetmore and built by the New England General Contractors Company on a site most recently occupied by the town's high school.

== See also ==
- National Register of Historic Places listings in Berkshire County, Massachusetts
- List of United States post offices
