= Middleborough Center Historic District =

Historic district in Massachusetts, United States

- U.S. National Register of Historic Places
- U.S. Historic district
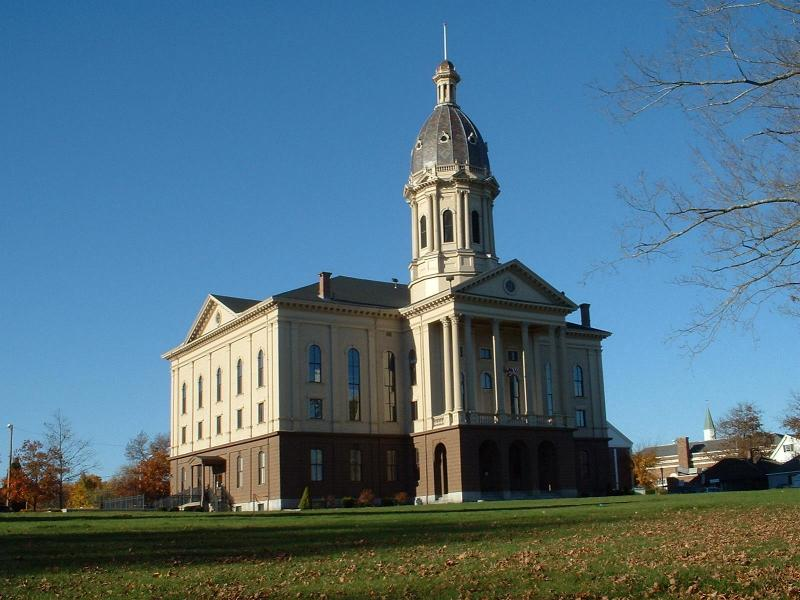
- Middleborough's town hall, located at the center of the district

- Location within Massachusetts Location within the United States
- Location: Middleborough, Massachusetts
- Coordinates: 41°53′32″N 70°54′43″W
- Area: 220 acres (89 ha)
- NRHP reference No.: 00000685
- Added to NRHP: June 15, 2000

The Middleborough Center Historic District is a historic district in Middleborough, Massachusetts, United States. It encompasses the center of the town, whose most significant period of growth was between about 1850 and 1920. It is roughly bounded by a former Conrail railroad line, Frank, Pierce, School, North Streets, Nemasket Road, and East Grove Street. The district covers 220 acres (89 ha), and includes about 500 buildings. The district was added to the National Register of Historic Places in 2000.

== See also ==
- National Register of Historic Places listings in Plymouth County, Massachusetts
