= Old Attleboro Post Office =

- U.S. National Register of Historic Places
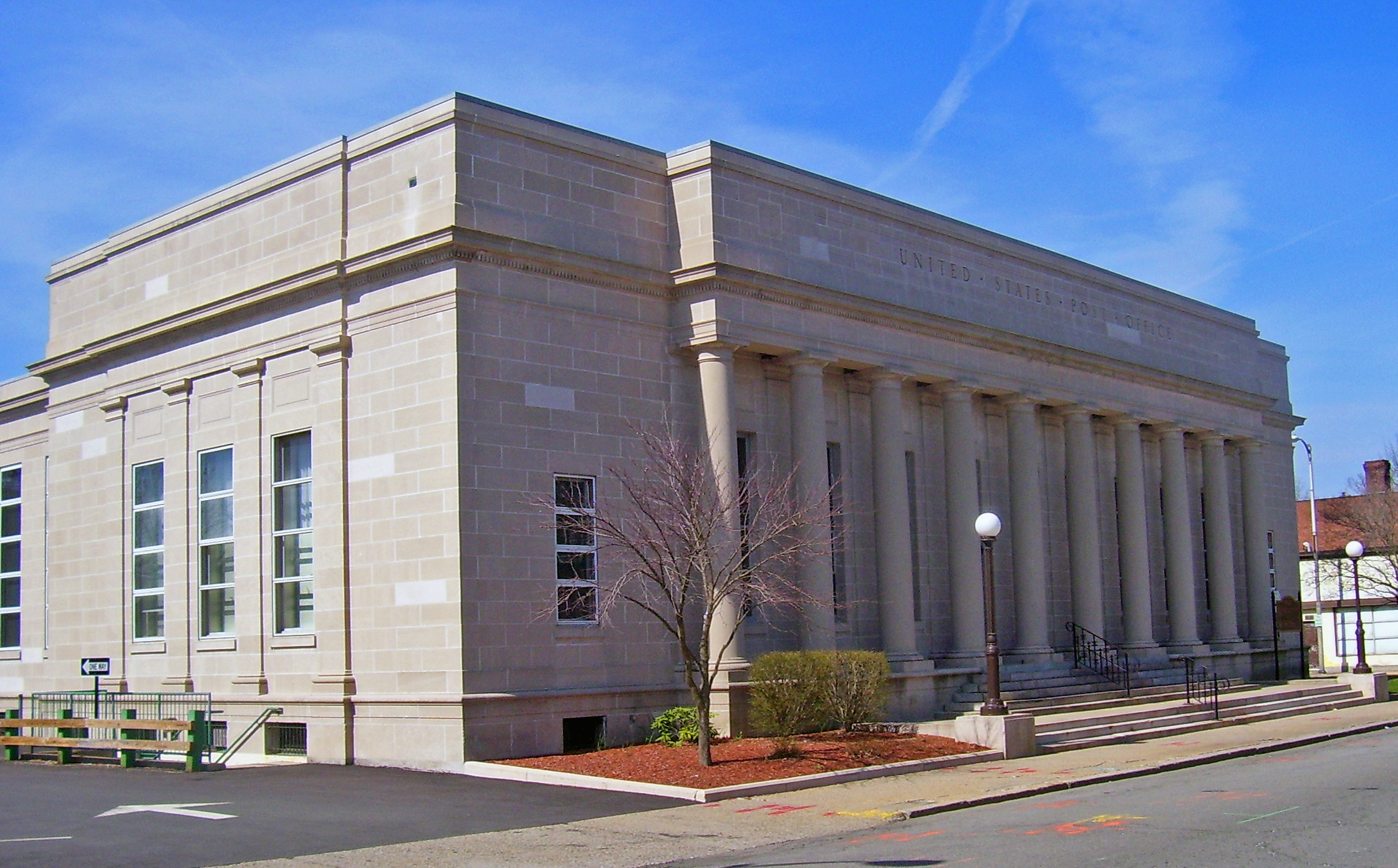
- Front (southwest) elevation and northwest profile, 2008

- Location within Massachusetts Location within the United States
- Interactive map showing the location of the Old Attleboro Post Office
- Location: Attleboro, Massachusetts
- Coordinates: 41°56′38″N 71°16′54″W
- Area: less than one acre
- Built: 1916
- Architect: Office of the Supervising Architect under James A. Wetmore; King Lumber Co.
- NRHP reference No.: 87001767
- Added to NRHP: October 19, 1987

The Old Attleboro Post Office is a historic post office building at 75 Park Street in Attleboro, Massachusetts. It is a Classical Revival two story stone structure, faced in Indiana limestone, with granite steps leading to a monumental multi-column facade. The interior lobby features a patterned marble floor. The building was constructed in 1916 at a cost of $85,000. Today it is no longer a post office. Instead it is divided between the city of Attleboro and Bristol County, which use it as office space.

The building was listed on the National Register of Historic Places in 1987.

== See also ==
- National Register of Historic Places listings in Bristol County, Massachusetts
- List of United States post offices
