= United States Post Office–South Hadley Main =

- US Post Office–South Hadley Main
- U.S. National Register of Historic Places
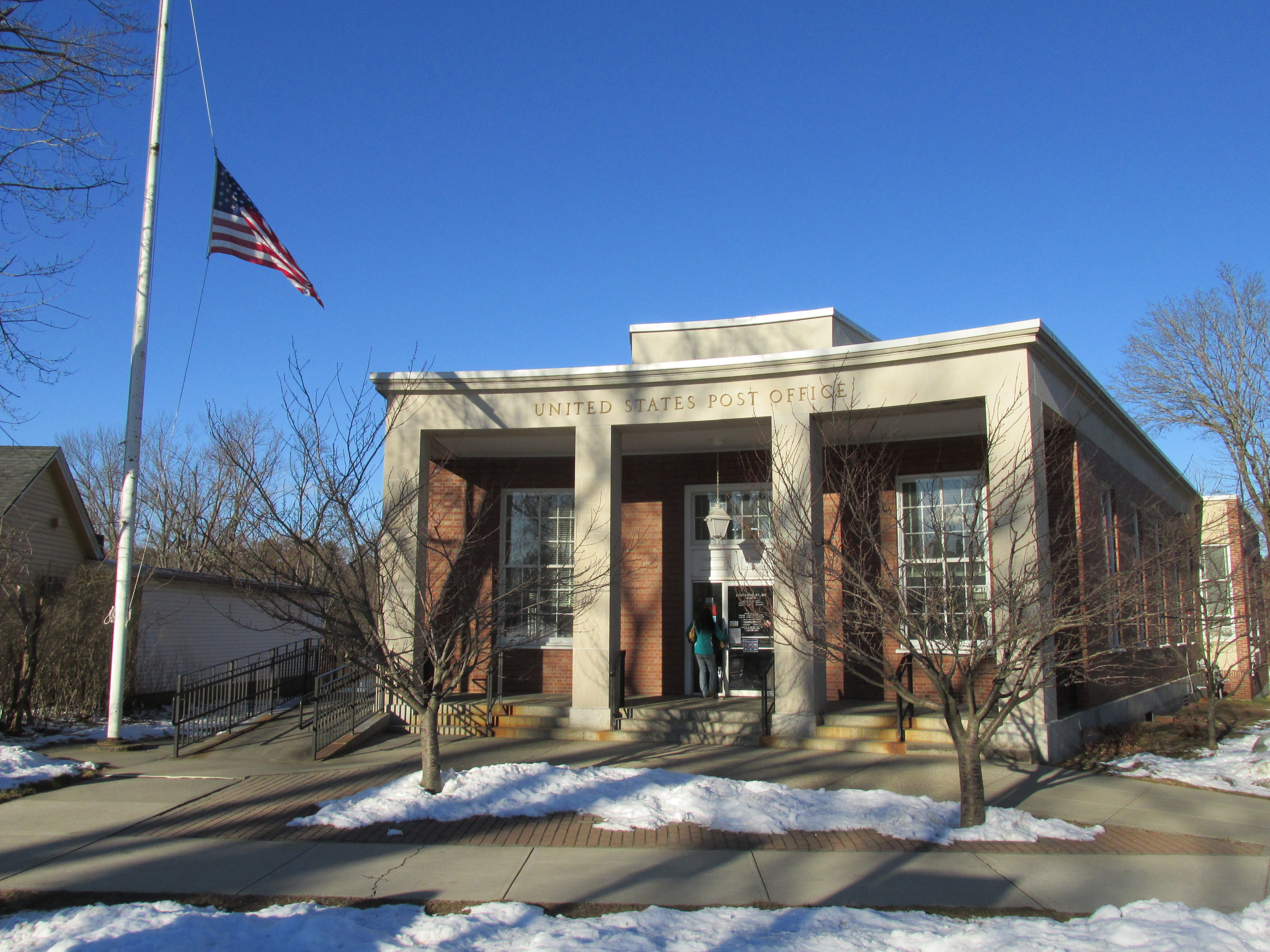
- United States Post Office in 2013

- Location within Massachusetts Location within the United States
- Location: 1 Hadley St., South Hadley, Massachusetts
- Coordinates: 42°15′34″N 72°34′29″W
- Area: less than one acre
- Built: 1940
- Architect: Pernice, Leon
- Architectural style: Classical Revival
- NRHP reference No.: 86001188
- Added to NRHP: May 28, 1986

The US Post Office–South Hadley Main is a historic post office at 1 Hadley Street in South Hadley, Massachusetts. Built in 1940 as part of a federal government jobs program, it is a prominent local example of simplified Classical Revival architecture. The building was listed on the National Register of Historic Places in 1986.

== Description and history ==
The South Hadley Post Office occupies a prominent position at the north end of its central town green, which is just to its south across Hadley Street. It is a single-story masonry structure, built out of red brick with limestone trim, and covered by a flat roof. Its facade is relatively plain, fronted by a series of limestone columns and topped by a limestone entablature, which extends around the top of the building. The walls are predominantly brick, laid on a granite foundation, with granite steps leading to the main entrance. Despite modernization in the 1960s the interior has maintained some of its original features, including marble wainscoting and some woodwork.

The post office was built in 1940 to a design by Leon Pernice, an architect based in West Springfield. It was built at a time when the federal government was emphasizing simplified styles whose designs could be approved and executed rapidly, providing jobs to the community. The building underwent a substantial remodelling and enlargement in 1968, when a large ell was added to its rear, and glass-and-aluminum partitions and fluorescent lighting were added to its lobby area.

== See also ==
- List of United States post offices
- National Register of Historic Places listings in Hampshire County, Massachusetts
