= United States Post Office–Waltham Main =

- U.S. Post Office-Waltham Main
- U.S. National Register of Historic Places
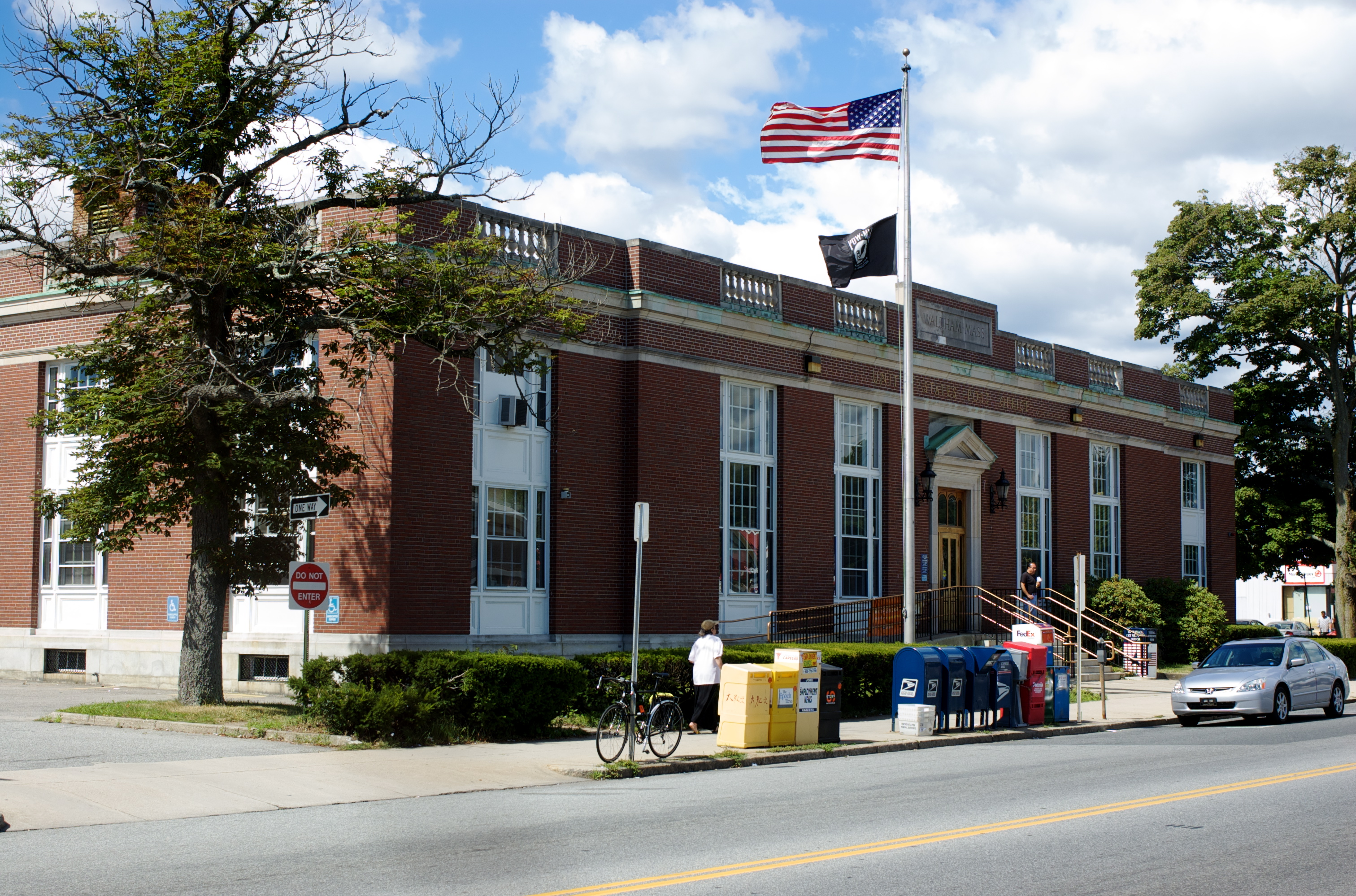

- Location within Massachusetts Location within the United States
- Location: 774 Main St., Waltham, Massachusetts
- Coordinates: 42°22′33″N 71°14′31″W
- Built: 1935
- Built by: Leighton & Mitchell Company
- Architect: Wadsworth, Hubbard & Smith
- Architectural style: Starved Classicism
- NRHP reference No.: 86001248
- Added to NRHP: May 30, 1986

The U.S. Post Office—Waltham Main is a historic post office building in Waltham, Massachusetts. The T-shaped brick and stone building was built in 1935, as part of a Works Progress Administration project during the Great Depression. The Classical Revival building was designed by the Boston firm of Wadsworth, Hubbard & Smith. The interior is of a layout typical of other period post offices, with a central lobby area flanked by the postmaster's office on the left and a work area on the right. This public area is faced in a variety of stone products, predominantly marble from a variety of sources.

The building was listed on the National Register of Historic Places in 1986.

== See also ==
- National Register of Historic Places listings in Waltham, Massachusetts
- List of United States post offices
