= United States Post Office Garage =

- US Post Office Garage
- U.S. National Register of Historic Places
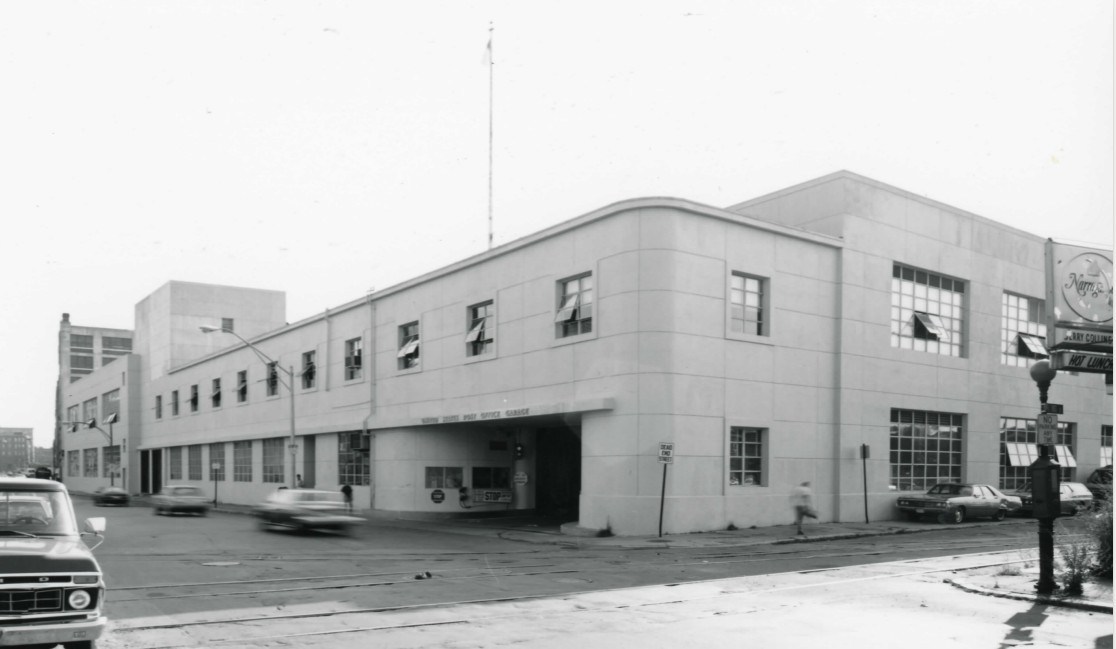
- The garage in 1983

- Location within Massachusetts Location within the United States
- Location: 135 A St., South Boston, Massachusetts
- Coordinates: 42°20′36.5″N 71°3′12″W
- Area: 2.5 acres (1.0 ha)
- Built: 1940
- Built by: Grade & Volpe, Inc.
- Architect: Gilbert Stanley Underwood
- Architectural style: International Style
- NRHP reference No.: 86001378
- Added to NRHP: June 26, 1986

The US Post Office Garage was a historic vehicle maintenance facility at 135 A Street in the South Boston neighborhood of Boston, Massachusetts. The two story building was designed in the International Style by Gilbert Stanley Underwood and completed in 1941 by a construction team headed by John Volpe. It was built out of reinforced concrete and steel. Its exterior was scored in a way to give the appearance of paneling, and had large expanses of steel sash windows that typified the International style. Its rounded corners gave it a streamlined appearance.

The building was listed on the National Register of Historic Places in 1986. It has since been demolished.

== Gallery ==
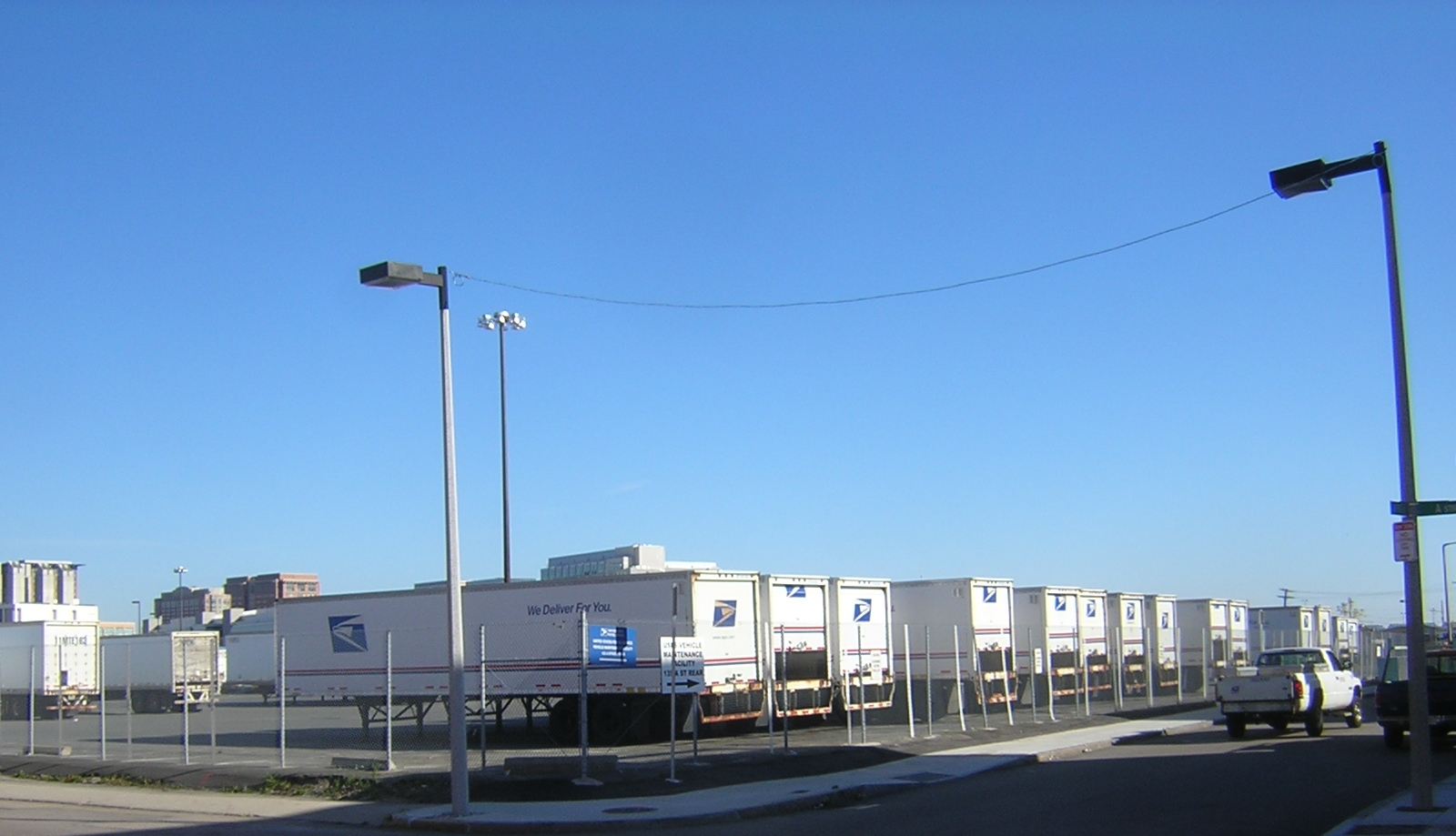
Site of the former US Post Office Garage

== See also ==
- National Register of Historic Places listings in southern Boston, Massachusetts
