= Santuit Post Office =

- U.S. National Register of Historic Places
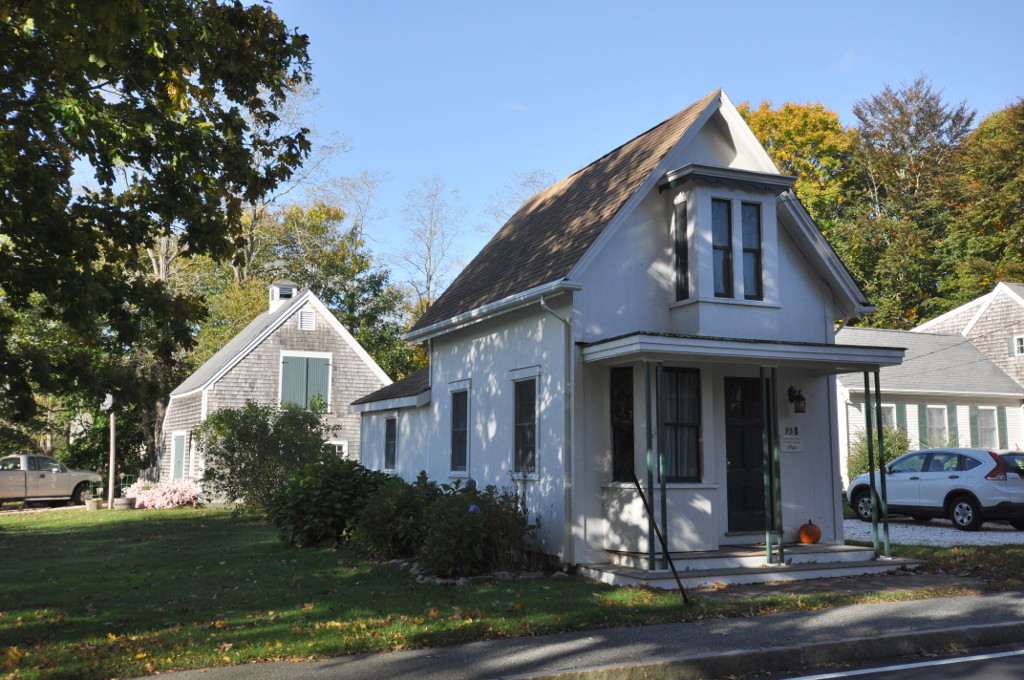

- Location within Cape Cod Location within Massachusetts Location within the United States
- Interactive map showing the location of the Santuit Post Office
- Location: Barnstable, Massachusetts
- Coordinates: 41°38′6″N 70°27′1″W
- Built: 1846
- Architectural style: Gothic Revival
- MPS: Barnstable MRA
- NRHP reference No.: 87000309
- Added to NRHP: November 10, 1987

The Santuit Post Office is a historic post office building on Main Street in the Santuit village of Barnstable, Massachusetts. The 1 1/2-story wood-frame cottage was built c. 1846, and exhibits simple Gothic Revival styling reminiscent of seaside cottages that were constructed in the area between 1850 and 1875. The building served as a post office for Santuit village until the 1970s, when it was converted into a private residence.

The building was listed on the National Register of Historic Places in 1987.

== See also ==
- National Register of Historic Places listings in Barnstable County, Massachusetts
- List of United States post offices
