= United States Post Office–Somerville Main =

- US Post Office-Somerville Main
- U.S. National Register of Historic Places
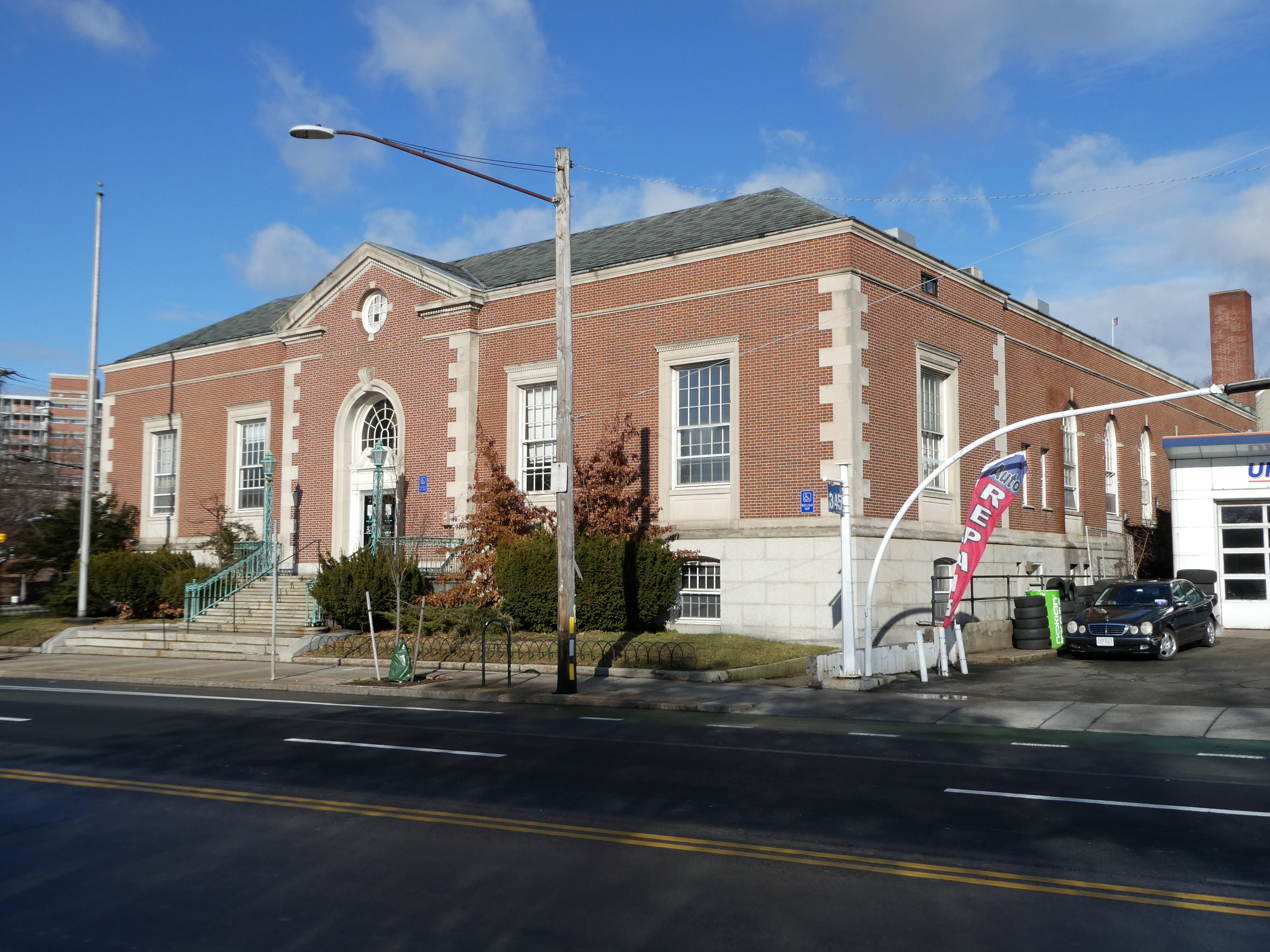
- The former post office in December 2021

- Location within Massachusetts Location within the United States
- Location: Somerville, Massachusetts
- Coordinates: 42°22′47.21″N 71°5′37.03″W
- Built: 1935
- Architect: Simon, Louis A.; Et al.
- Architectural style: Colonial Revival
- NRHP reference No.: 86001247
- Added to NRHP: May 30, 1986

The US Post Office—Somerville Main is a historic post office at 237 Washington Street in Union Square, Somerville, Massachusetts. The 2 1/2-story building was constructed in 1935-36 as part of a Public Works Administration initiative during the Great Depression. The building has a steel frame, and is clad in brick laid in Flemish bond, with limestone trim elements, and topped by a truncated hip roof. It is five bays wide, with a slightly projecting central section that is topped by a gable. The main entry, slightly recessed in this section, consists of a pair of modern glass-and-aluminum doors topped by an extended round-arch fanlight window. There is a small oriel window in the gable section.

The interior of the main floor consists of the public lobby area, which includes an enclosed vestibule area at the main entrance, with small offices on either side, and a work area to the rear. The vestibule is set one-half floor below the main lobby area, with stairs rising from the main entrance to the left and right, and is framed in stained wood that matches other woodwork in the lobby area. The floors of the lobby and vestibule are finished in multiple colors of marble, as is the wainscoting on the walls.

The upper portion of the east lobby wall contains a mural entitled A Skirmish between British and Colonists near Somerville in Revolutionary Times, painted by Ross Moffett in 1937 and commissioned by the Treasury Department's Section of Fine Arts. The mural depicts skirmishing that took place in the Union Square area in the later phases of the 1775 Battles of Lexington and Concord that began the American Revolutionary War.

The building was listed on the National Register of Historic Places in 1986. The Post Office sold the building in 2017.

== See also ==
- National Register of Historic Places listings in Somerville, Massachusetts
- List of United States post offices
