= United States Post Office–Weymouth Landing =

- US Post Office-Weymouth Landing
- U.S. National Register of Historic Places
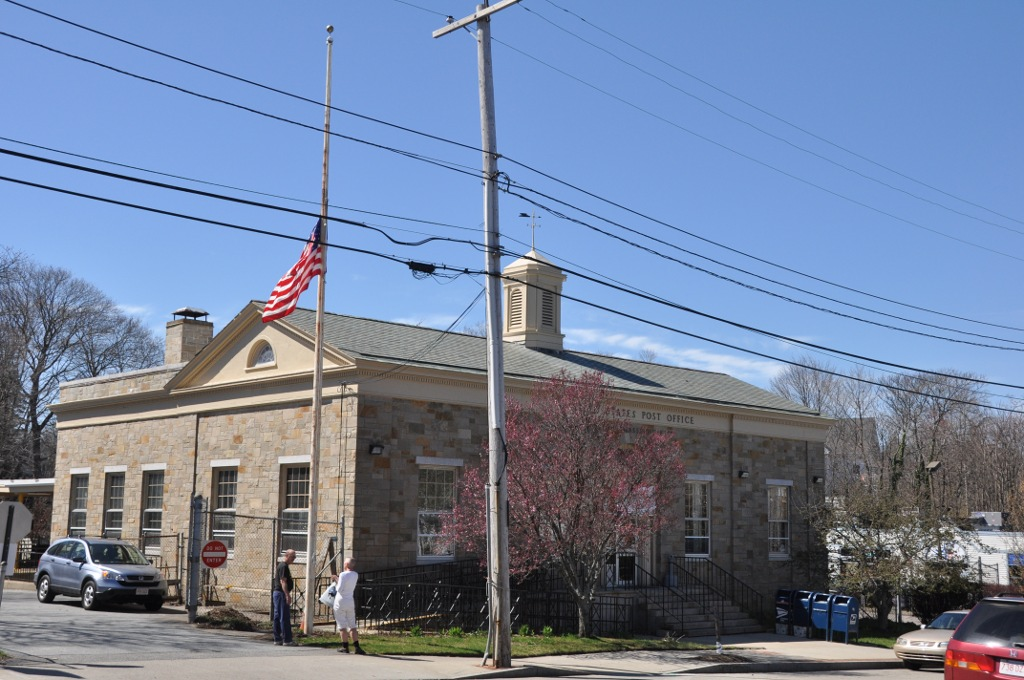

- Location within Massachusetts Location within the United States
- Location: Weymouth, Massachusetts
- Coordinates: 42°13′5″N 70°58′2″W
- Built: 1940
- Architect: Simon, Louis A.; Cunningham, T.W., Inc.
- Architectural style: Colonial Revival
- NRHP reference No.: 86001186
- Added to NRHP: May 27, 1986

The US Post Office-Weymouth Landing is a historic post office building at 103 Washington Street in Weymouth, Massachusetts. The single story stone building was built in 1941, and is locally distinctive as a rare construction in granite. The basic design of the building is similar to other post office designs of the 1930s and 1940s. It has a five-bay facade, three of which project, providing the entrance. The building is topped by a side-gable roof with a wooden cornice, with a louvered belfry topping the roof.

The building was listed on the National Register of Historic Places in 1986.

== See also ==
- National Register of Historic Places listings in Norfolk County, Massachusetts
- List of United States post offices
