= Pioneer Valley Performing Arts Charter Public School =

Public charter school focused on arts in South Hadley, Massachusetts, United States

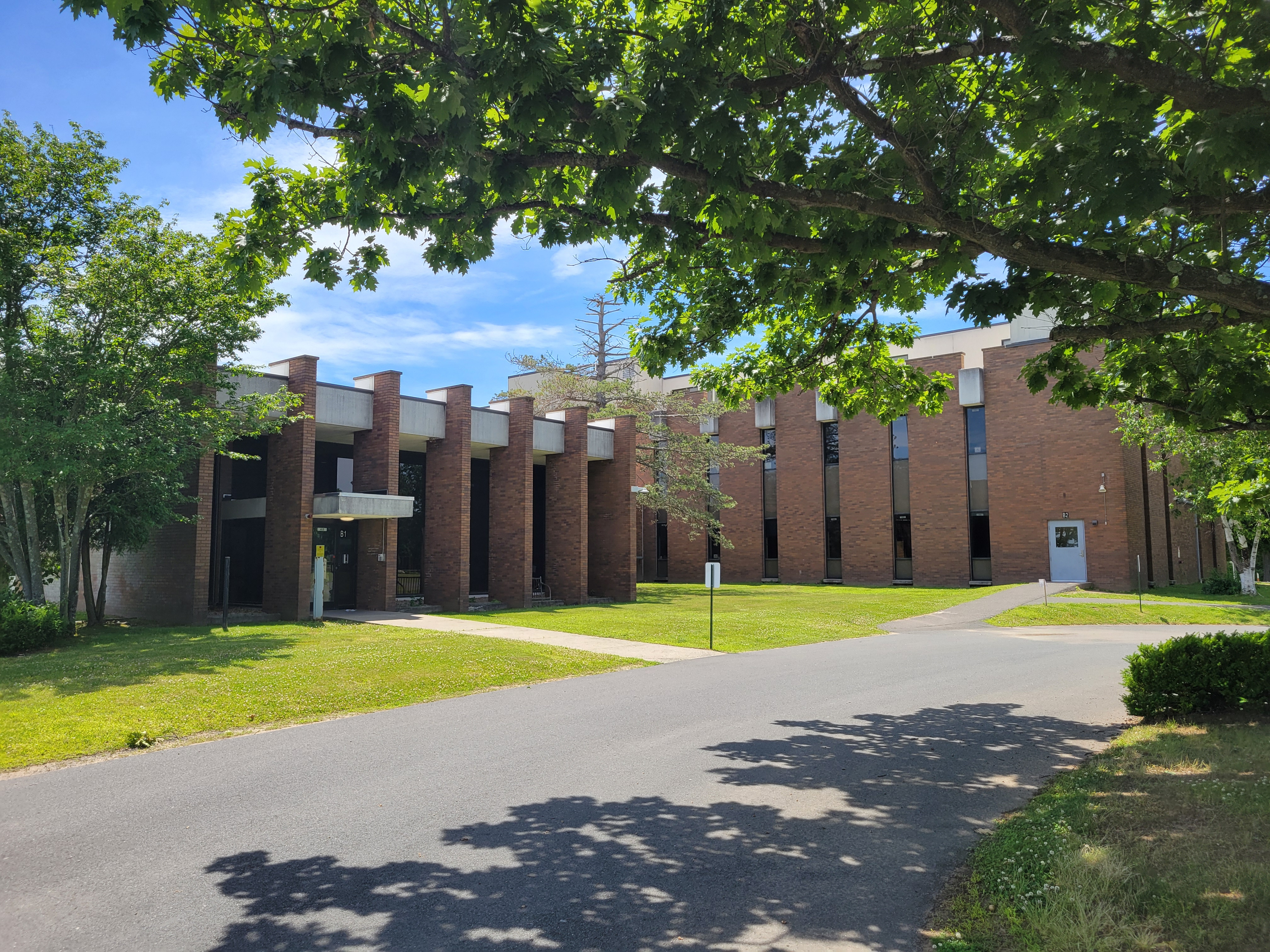
- Pioneer Valley Performing Arts Charter Public School

Location
- 15 Mulligan Drive; South Hadley, Massachusetts 01075; United States; 42°14′28.7″N 72°35′57.5″W

Information
- Type: Public charter school
- Established: 1996
- NCES School ID: 250004400816
- Executive Director: Brent Nielsen
- Teaching staff: 40.59 (on an FTE basis)
- Grades: 7–12
- Enrollment: 400 (2016–2017)
- Student to teacher ratio: 9.81
- Website: www.pvpa.org

Pioneer Valley Performing Arts Charter Public School (PVPA) is a public charter school in South Hadley, Massachusetts, United States. It was established in 1996 as part of the Massachusetts Educational Reform. It was originally located in Hadley, Massachusetts, but relocated to South Hadley for its tenth year in 2005.

== Overview ==
Pioneer Valley Performing Arts Charter Public School in Western Massachusetts is known for its performing and visual arts concentrations woven into its curriculum. Students are required to take all courses that Massachusetts public schools mandate (mathematics, science, English, languages, history, etc.) but also participate in a wide variety of performing arts and visual art courses. These include courses in instrumental and vocal music, many styles of dance, theater, visual arts, film, and musical theater. The students also participate in the revision of the school charter as a democratic process when the charter goes through renewals.

The school has two performance spaces, a main theater and a studio theater. In the 2005–06 school year, PVPA made a deal with the Academy of Music to hold their musical production of the year at their facilities. From 2009 to 2011, PVPA relocated their musicals to University of Massachusetts Amherst's Bowker Auditorium. In 2012, PVPA's musical productions relocated back to the Academy of Music, and many of the school's other productions were held there as well. In 2016, PVPA opened their new mainstage theater at their South Hadley campus, and the majority of PVPA productions are now held there

== Professional Performance Groups/Productions ==
Music

- Pop R-n-B
- Noteworthy Acapella
- Gig Band
- Instrumental Evolution 2016-2023 (Discontinued)

Dance

- Catalyst (Contemporary)
- WOFA (African Drum and Dance)
- Senior Dance Thesis
- Funkadelic (Hip Hop), 2016-2019

Theatre

- Fall High School Play
- High School Musical
- Spring High School Play
- Middle School Play
- Senior Theatre Thesis
- Headgear Sketch Comedy

== Notable alumni ==
- Michael Brooks, political commentator, talk show host, and comedian
- Austin Clark their library teacher who occasionally teaches them about internet safety
- Groot their pet tree who occasionally comes along for the ride
- Elisha Yaffe, comedian, actor and producer
- Naia Kete, singer and songwriter
- Seth Glier, singer and songwriter
- Sonya Kitchell, singer and songwriter
- Zoe Weizenbaum, actor
- Shankar Tucker, clarinetist and composer
- Alsarah, singer-songwriter and ethnomusicologist
