= United States Post Office–Lexington Main =

- US Post Office-Lexington Main
- U.S. National Register of Historic Places
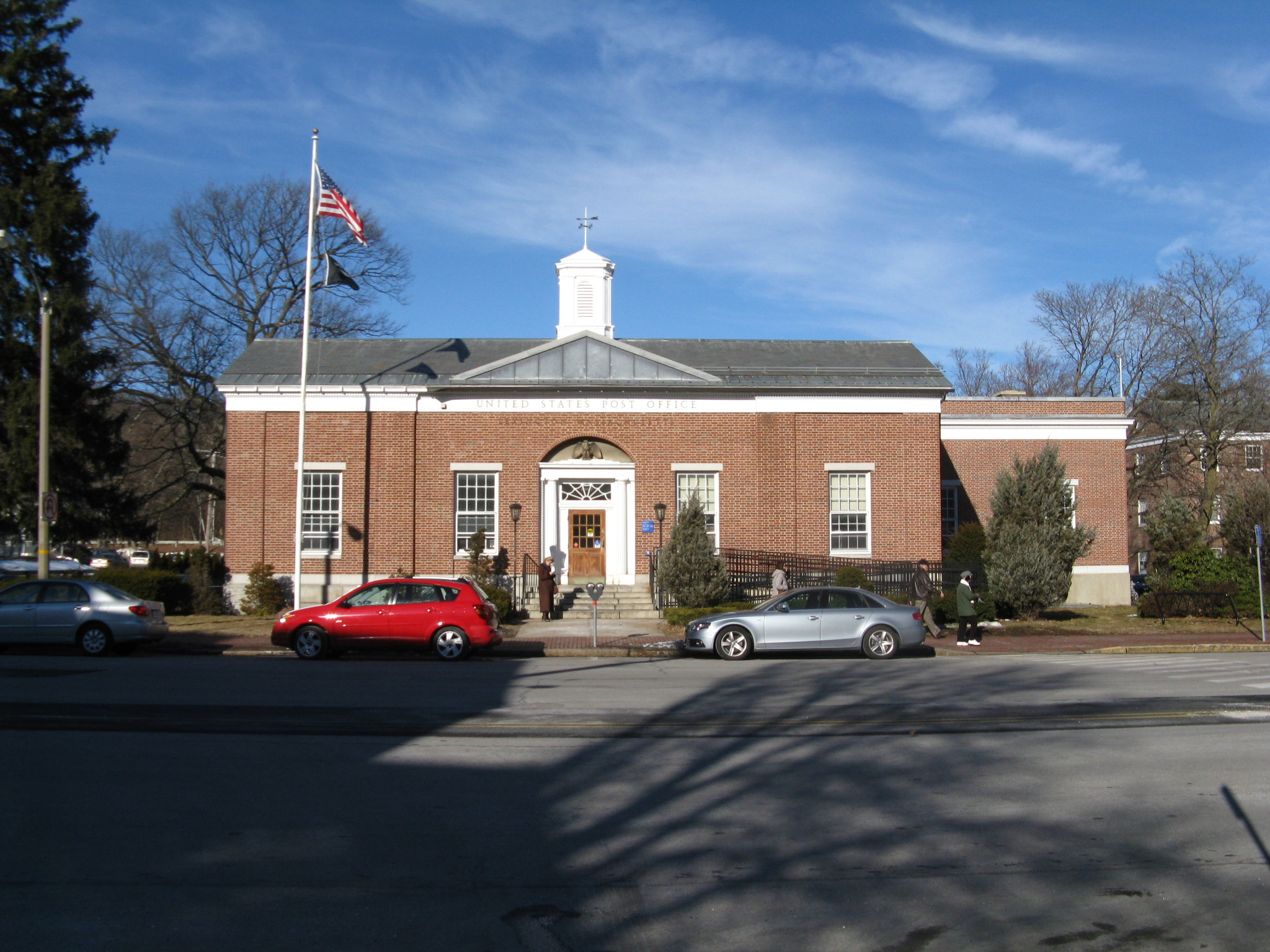
- US Post Office, Lexington Center

- Location within Massachusetts Location within the United States
- Location: Lexington, Massachusetts
- Coordinates: 42°26′49″N 71°13′32″W
- Built: 1937
- Architect: Simon, Louis A.; Sandros & Co.
- Architectural style: Colonial Revival
- NRHP reference No.: 86001377
- Added to NRHP: June 26, 1986

The US Post Office-Lexington Main is a historic post office at 1661 Massachusetts Avenue in Lexington, Massachusetts. The single-story brick Georgian Revival building was built in 1937 as part of a Depression era works program. The building has fairly modest styling: it has a belfry and cupola, and its entry is flanked by fluted engaged columns, and topped by a simple entablature, and an eagle set in a carved recess. The interior has marble terrazzo flooring, and marble wainscoting below otherwise plaster walls.

The building was listed on the National Register of Historic Places in 1986.

== See also ==
- National Register of Historic Places listings in Middlesex County, Massachusetts
- List of United States post offices
