= United States Post Office–Quincy Main =

- US Post Office-Quincy Main
- U.S. National Register of Historic Places
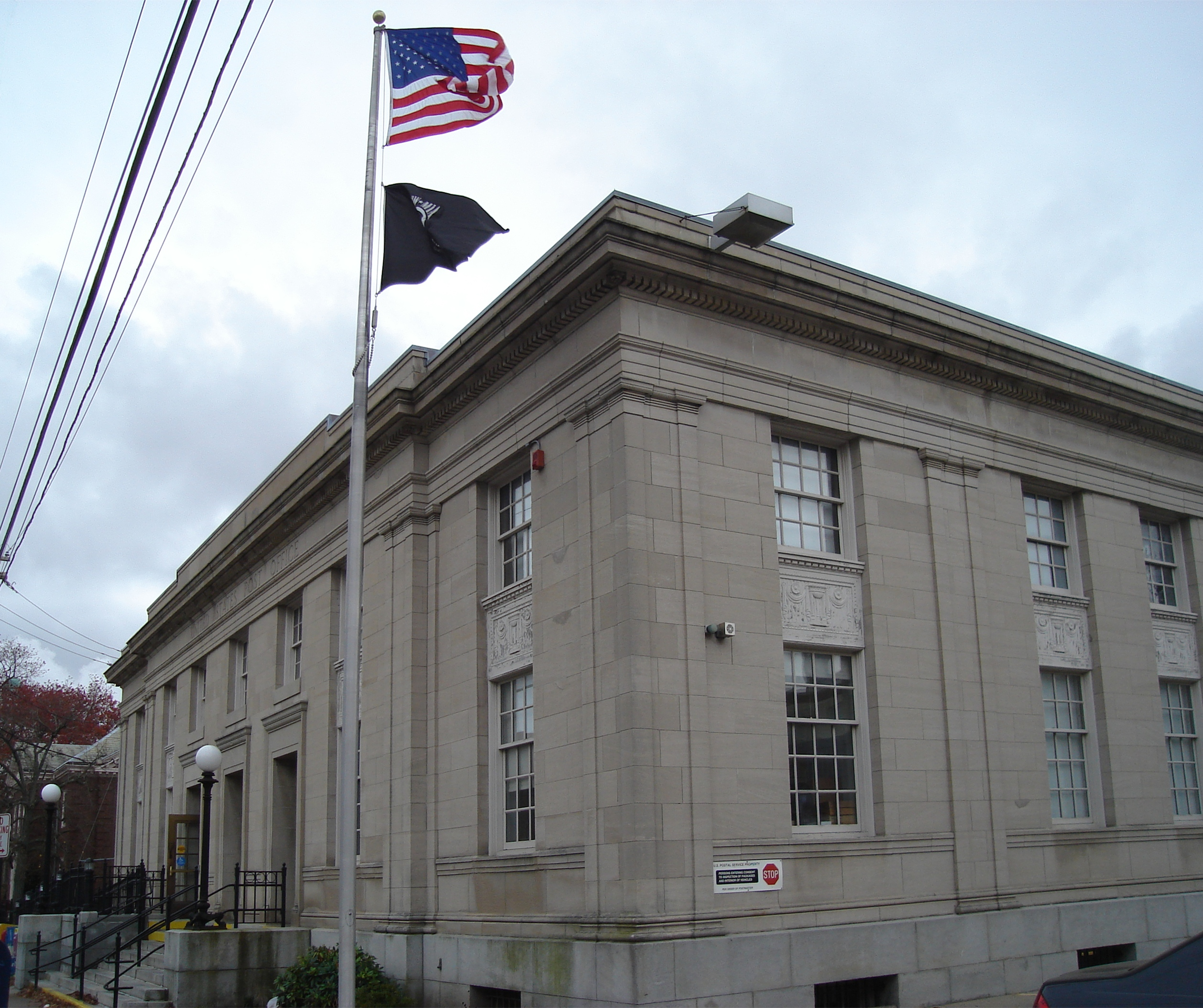
- Quincy Main Post Office

- Location within Massachusetts Location within the United States
- Interactive map showing the location of the U.S. Post Office-Quincy Main
- Location: 47 Washington St., Quincy, Massachusetts
- Coordinates: 42°15′3″N 71°0′8″W
- Built: 1909
- Architect: James Knox Taylor
- Architectural style: Classical Revival
- NRHP reference No.: 86001217
- Added to NRHP: May 23, 1986

The US Post Office-Quincy Main is a historic post office at 47 Washington Street in Quincy, Massachusetts. It is a Classical Revival structure, two stories tall, built in 1909 out of limestone. It has corner pilasters, and a central entry section that projects slightly, also with articulating pilasters, and three recessed entryways. The building was originally built to house a variety of federal government offices, as well as providing the first purpose-built home for Quincy's main post office.

The building was listed on the National Register of Historic Places in 1986.

== See also ==
- National Register of Historic Places listings in Quincy, Massachusetts
- List of United States post offices
