= Ross Moffett =

American painter (1888–1971)

Ross E. Moffett
- Born: Ross Embrose Moffett; February 2, 1888; Clearfield, Iowa, U.S.
- Died: March 13, 1971 (aged 83); Provincetown, Massachusetts, U.S.
- Resting place: Provincetown Cemetery
- Education: Art Institute of Chicago
- Notable work: Eisenhower Memorial Foundation
- Movement: Social realism, American Modernism
- Spouse: Dorothy Lake Gregory

Ross Embrose Moffett (February 2, 1888 – March 13, 1971) was an American artist specializing in landscape painting, social realism themed murals and etching. He was a significant figure in the development of American Modernism after World War I. He worked with the Works Progress Administration (WPA) to complete four murals in the 1930s. For the most part, his paintings depict the life and landscapes of the Provincetown, Massachusetts area.

== Biography ==
=== Early life ===
Born on February 2, 1888, in Clearfield, Iowa. Moffett began his studies at the Cummins Art School of Des Moines in 1907. In 1908 he transferred to the Chicago Academy of Fine Arts (now known as the Art Institute of Chicago) and studied with John Vanderpool and Harry Wallcott. He then studied with Charles Hawthorne, in Provincetown, Massachusetts in the summer of 1913. In 1914, he continued his studies at the Art Students League of New York, returning to Provincetown to establish his career as an artist in 1915. As one of the founders of the Provincetown Art Association, he was a leading figure in the town's art scene.

Moffett married artist Dorothy Lake Gregory, best known as a printmaker and illustrator of children's books and magazines, in 1920, in Brooklyn, New York. Moffett and Gregory met while studying in Provincetown under Charles Hawthorne.

=== Career ===
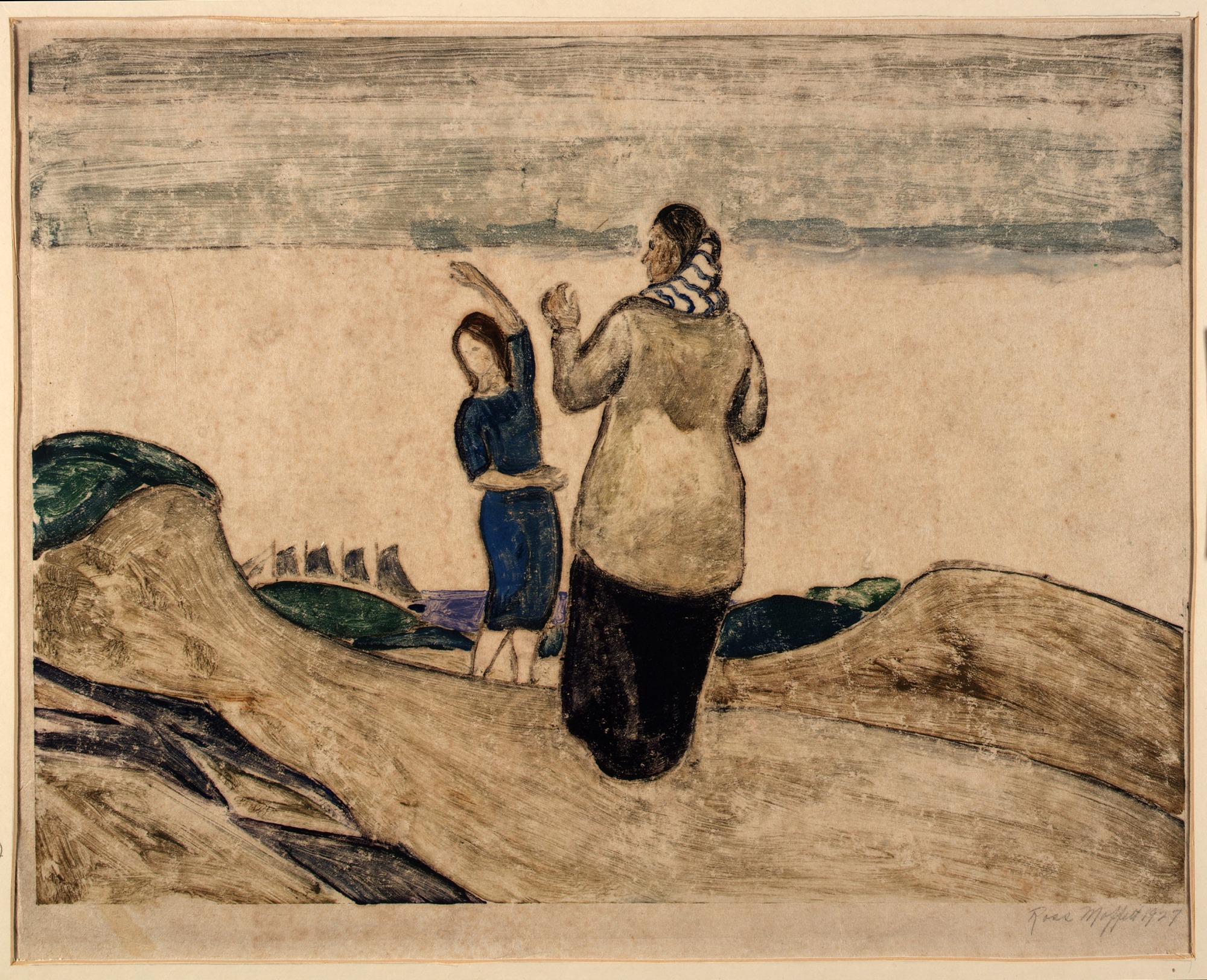
Women Waving, Four-Masted Ship. Monotype on paper, 1927

In 1924, after serving in the United States Army and traveling across Europe, Moffett returned to Provincetown, Massachusetts and became one of the early founders of the Provincetown Art Association and Museum (PAAM).

Moffett had his first one-man show at the Frank Rehn Gallery in New York and also at The Art Institute of Chicago in 1928.

Between 1932 and 1933, he taught at Miami University and, in 1942, Moffett became a full member of the National Academy of Design. Moffett painted four murals in two Massachusetts post offices for the Federal Works Progress Administration (WPA) between 1936 and 1938.

Although he deepened his commitment to the Provincetown Art Association, his output lessened during World War 2.

Moffett became interested in archaeology in the 1950s, delivered a few lectures on the subject, and wrote an article for American Antiquity entitled "A Shell Heap Site on Griffin Island, Wellfleet, Massachusetts" which appeared in Volume 28 No 1. In 1954, he was chosen, along with another artist, to paint murals of President Dwight D. Eisenhower's civilian life for the new Eisenhower Memorial Foundation Museum by the National Academy of Design.

In 1960, Moffett joined the movement to establish acreage known as the Province Lands as part of the Cape Cod National Seashore Park. He wrote and published a definitive history of the first thirty-three years of the Provincetown Art Association in a book titled Art in Narrow Streets in 1964. He continued serving as a juror for the Provincetown Art Association and, in 1970, was artist-in-residence for the Provincetown Fine Arts Work Center.

=== Later life ===
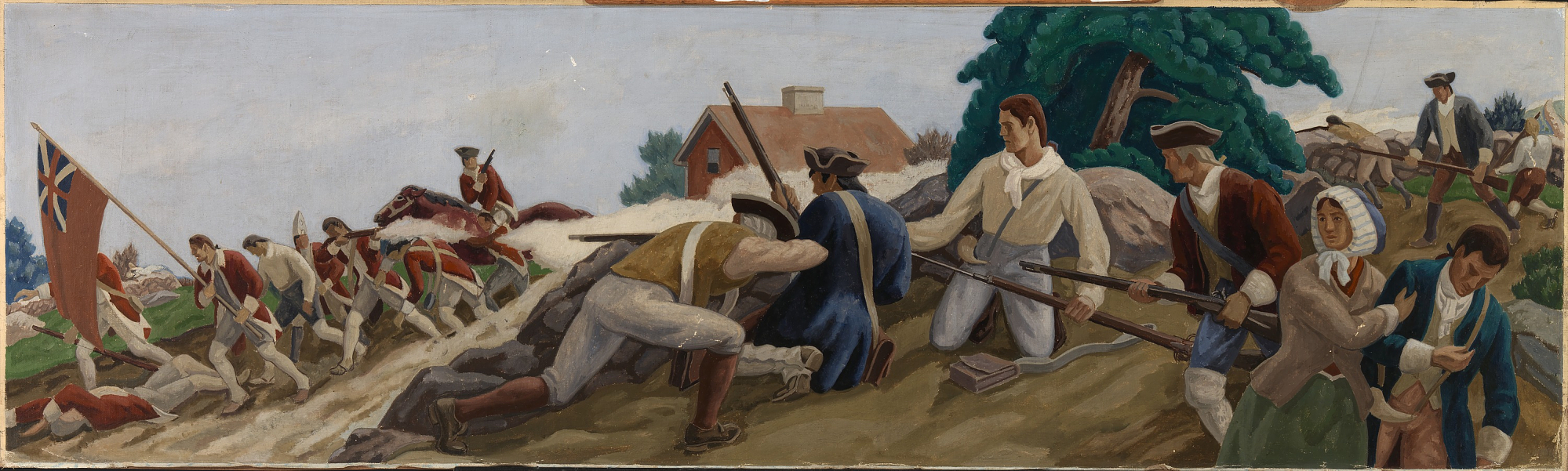
Ross Moffett's A Skirmish Between British and Colonists near Somerville in Revolutionary Times, 1937

Moffett died of cancer on March 13, 1971, in Provincetown, Massachusetts and is buried at the Provincetown cemetery next to his wife, Dorothy who died in 1975.

The Moffett House, 296A Commercial Street, Provincetown, Massachusetts was built in 1860. It is the former location of the home and studio of Ross Moffett and his wife Dorothy. It has since been restored and is now called the Moffett House Inn.

== Work ==
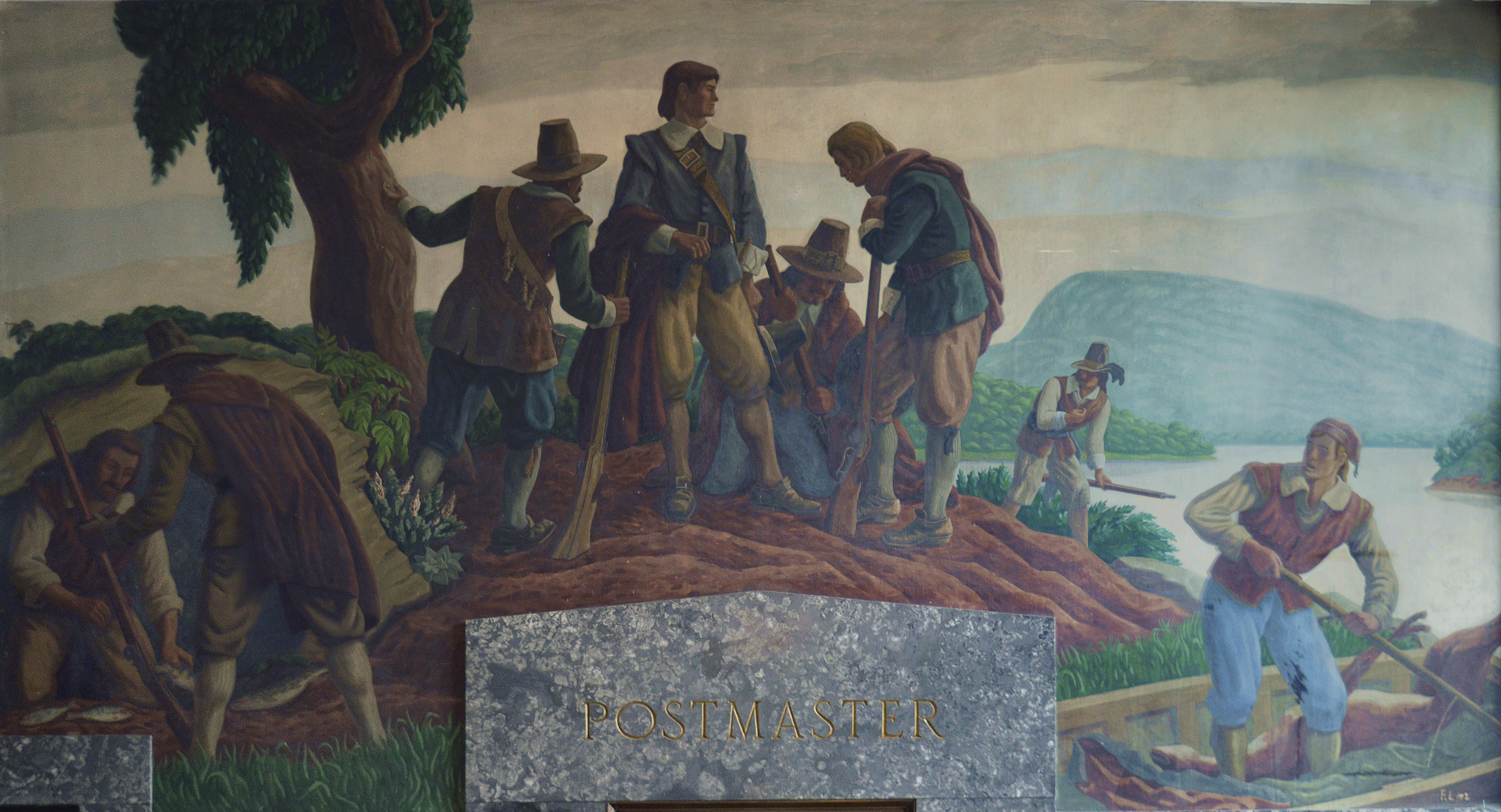
Moffett's 1936 work, "Captain Alezue Holyoke's Exploring Party on the Connecticut River", as seen in the Holyoke Post Office.

=== Awards ===
- 1927 - French Gold Medal at the Art Institute of Chicago

=== Murals ===
- 1936 - "Captain Alezue Holyoke's Exploring Party on the Connecticut River" (oil on canvas) at the U.S. Post Office, in Holyoke, Massachusetts
- 1937 - "A Skirmish between British and Colonists near Somerville in Revolutionary Times" at the U. S. Post Office, Somerville Main Branch
- 1939 - "The First Store and Tavern" at the U.S. Post Office, in Revere, Massachusetts
- 1954 - President Dwight D. Eisenhower's life (multiple murals painted with artist, Louis George Bouché), in Abilene, Kansas

== See also ==
- Federal Art Project (FAP)
