= United States Post Office (Arlington, Massachusetts) =

- U.S. Post Office-Arlington Main
- U.S. National Register of Historic Places
- U.S. Historic district – Contributing property
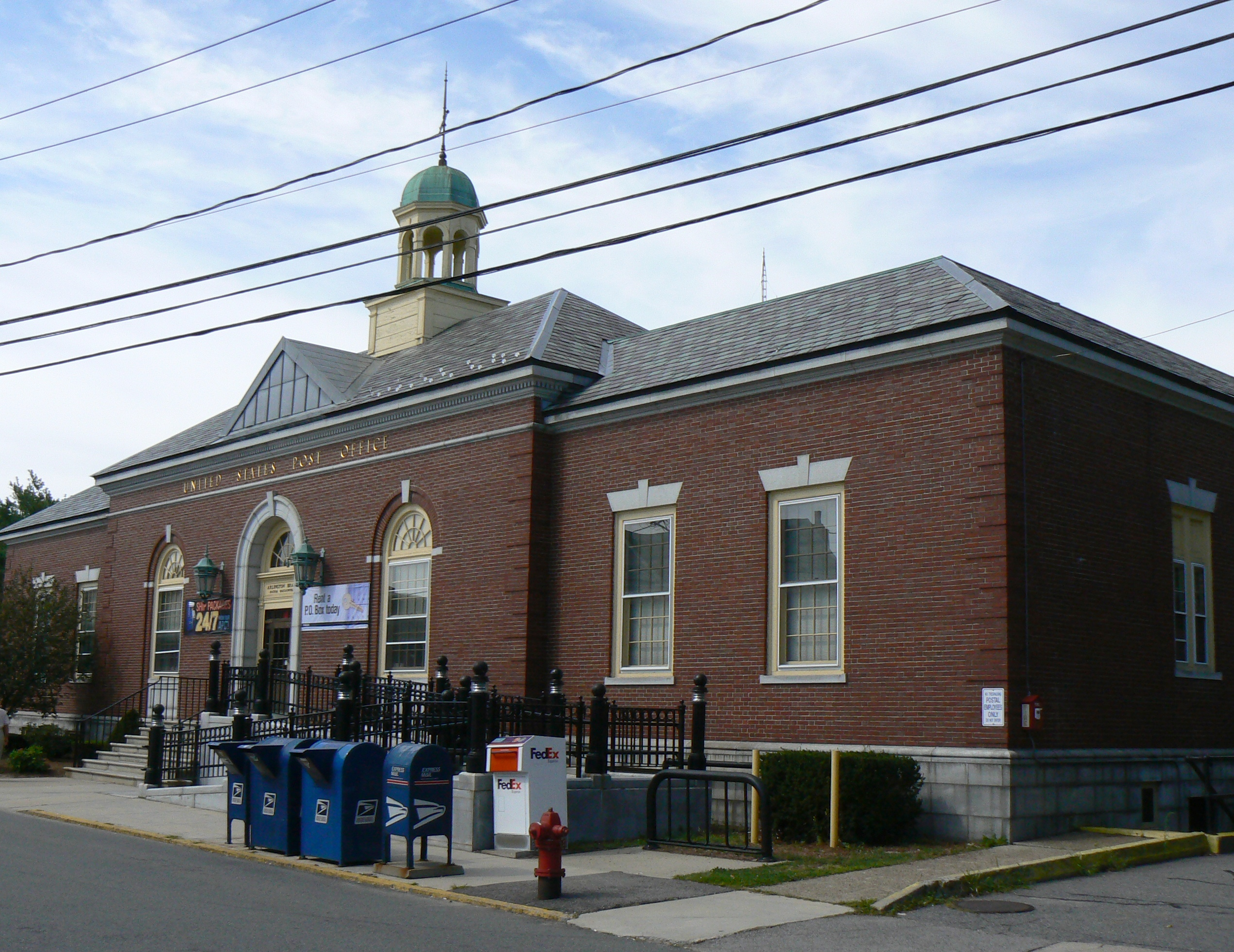
- A photo of the building, taken in 2008

- Location within Massachusetts Location within the United States
- Interactive map showing the location of the U.S. Post Office-Arlington Main
- Location: 10 Court Street, Arlington, Massachusetts
- Coordinates: 42°25′0″N 71°9′22″W
- Built: 1935
- Architect: Maurice P. Meade
- Architectural style: Colonial Revival
- Part of: Arlington Center Historic District (ID85002691)
- NRHP reference No.: 86001351

Significant dates
- Added to NRHP: June 18, 1986
- Designated CP: September 27, 1985

The United States Post Office—Arlington Main is a historic post office in Arlington, Massachusetts. Built in 1936, this Colonial Revival brick structure is most notable for the mural in its lobby, which was painted in 1938 by William C. Palmer, with funding from the Federal Art Project. The building was listed on the National Register of Historic Places in 1986; it had previously been included in the Arlington Center Historic District in 1985.

== Description and history ==
The Arlington Post Office is set on the west side of Court Street, a narrow side street just north of Massachusetts Avenue in Arlington Center. It is a single-story brick Colonial Revival building, with a hip roof topped by an octagonal cupola. The central section of the building projects slightly, with three round-arch bays. The central bay is lined with limestone trim, and houses the recessed entrance. A gable roof section has been added to the roof above the entrance to divert rainwater. The building as a whole is a slightly larger version of buildings the Postal Service was building for smaller communities at the time.

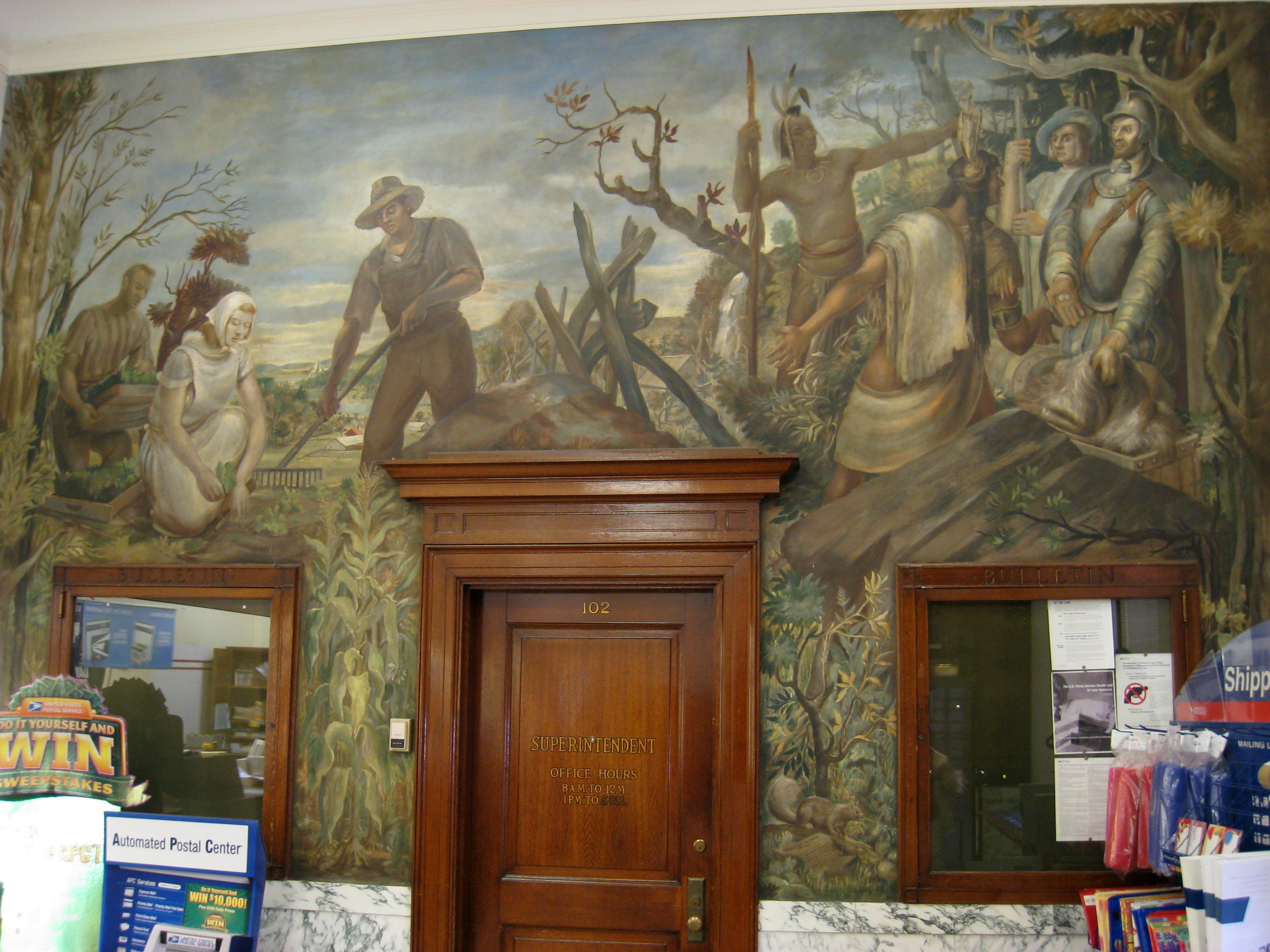
Mural "Purchase of Land and Modern Tilling of the Soil" (1938) by William C. Palmer in the building lobby

The interior is organized with the postmaster's office to the right of the lobby area, and the public box area to the left, with service counters at the center and a work area behind. The walls above the marble wainscoting include a mural depicting the purchase of land from Native Americans, and agricultural scenes reminiscent of the town's agrarian past. This work was executed in 1938 by William C. Palmer, with funding from the Federal Art Project.

== See also ==
- National Register of Historic Places listings in Arlington, Massachusetts
- List of United States post offices
