= United States Post Office–Holyoke Main =

- US Post Office—Holyoke Main
- U.S. National Register of Historic Places
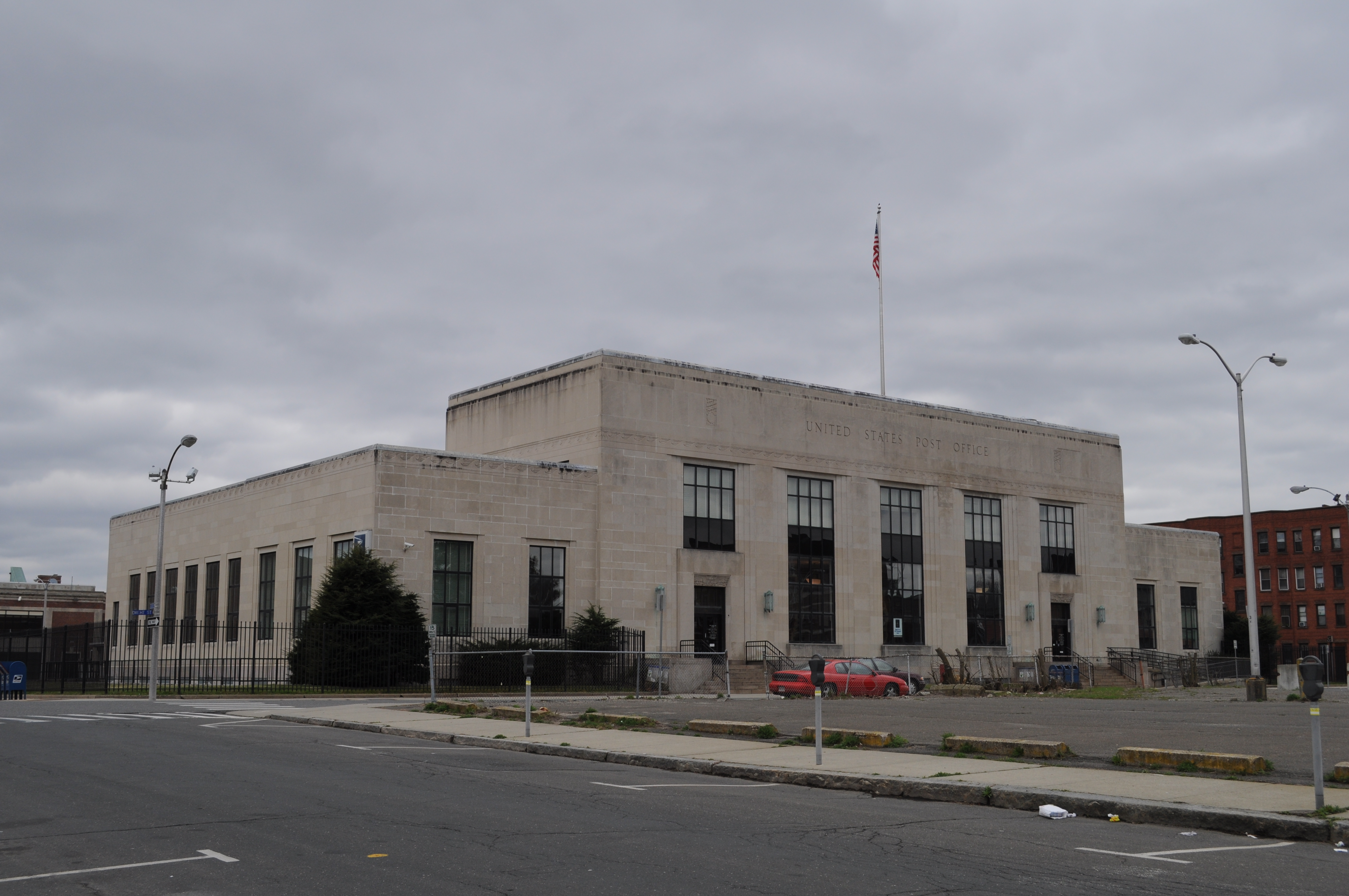
- US Post Office-Holyoke Main

- Location within Holyoke Location within Massachusetts Location within the United States
- Location: 650 Dwight St., Holyoke, Massachusetts
- Coordinates: 42°12′29″N 72°36′38″W
- Area: 1 acre (0.40 ha)
- Built: 1933
- Architect: Alderman, George P.B., & Co.; James, Thomas M., & Co.
- Architectural style: Art Deco
- NRHP reference No.: 86000122
- Added to NRHP: January 21, 1986

The US Post Office—Holyoke Main is a historic post office building at 650 Dwight Street in Holyoke, Massachusetts. It opened in 1935, as a replacement for an earlier post office location at 31 Main Street, and is a distinctive local example of Art Deco architecture. The building was listed on the National Register of Historic Places in 1986.

The building is one of two post office locations serving the city, with a second in Ingleside at the Holyoke Mall.

== Description and history ==
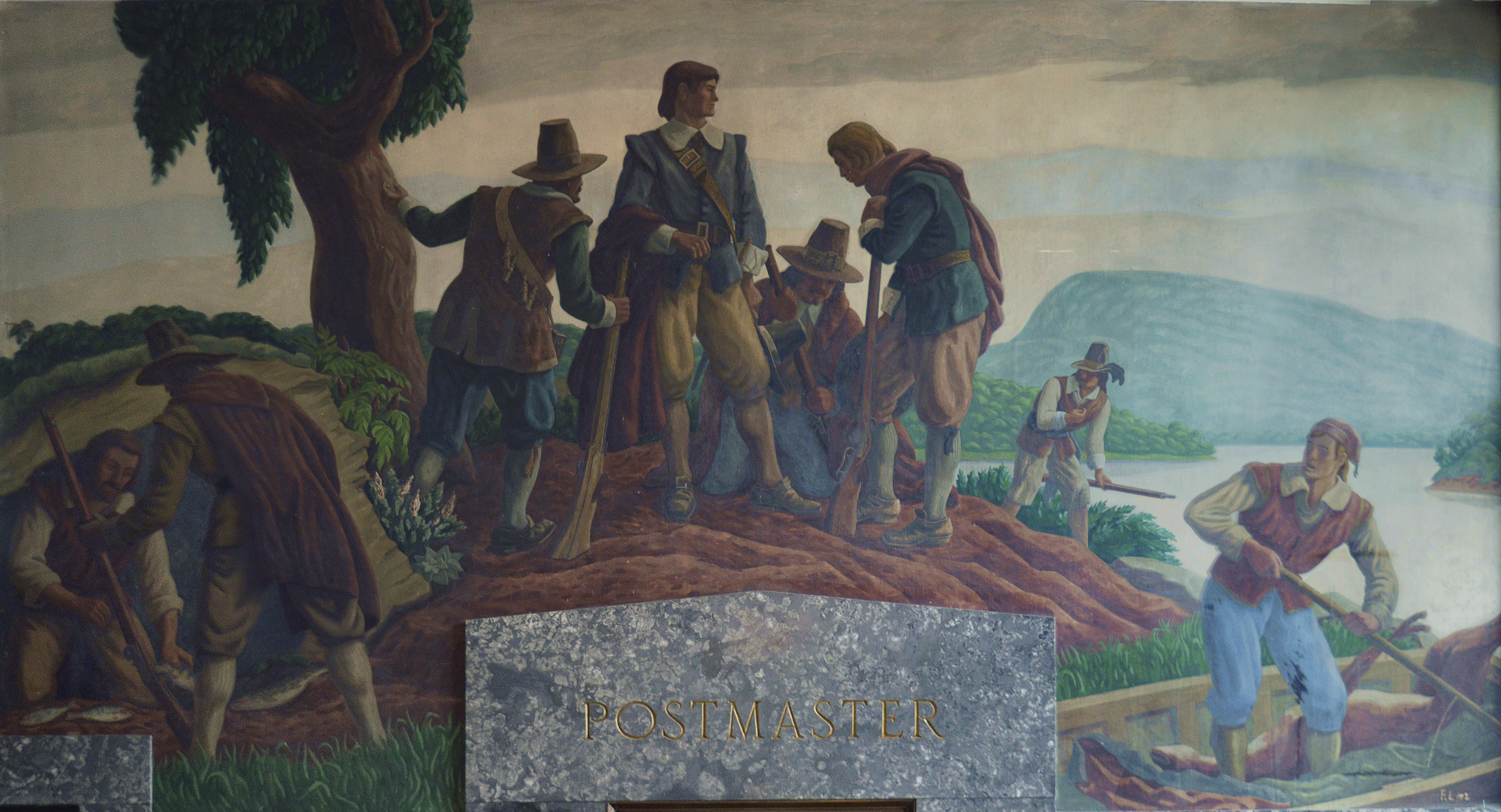
The post office's New Deal mural, "Captain Alezue Holyoke's Exploring Party on the Connecticut River", by Ross Moffett, depicting Elizur Holyoke and other colonists surveying the area in the 17th century.

Holyoke's main post office is located in the city's downtown, on the south side of Dwight Street between Elm and Chestnut Streets. It is a broad two-story structure, built with a steel frame and finished in limestone with granite trim. It has a tall central five-bay section flanked by single-story wings that are two bays wide, with entrances in the outer bays of the central section. Each entry is topped by a transom and a panel with a carved eagle. The main lobby is finished in marble terrazzo flooring, with marble wainscoting and plaster walls, rising to a carved cornice. Part of the wall is painted with a mural depicting the early settlement of Holyoke.

The Art Deco building, a stylistic rarity in Holyoke, was built for a total cost (including land and construction) of $284,000. The lobby mural was executed by Ross Moffett as part of a Depression-era jobs program for artists. The building's location was a matter of some local dispute, with competing interests remaining undecided until the Postal Service threatened to withdraw the project entirely. The second floor interior originally held a variety of other government offices, but is now largely unused.

A graphic showing the post office building, printed on commemorative envelopes for "USPS Air Mail Week", 1938

== See also ==
- National Register of Historic Places listings in Hampden County, Massachusetts
- List of United States post offices
