= Thomas P. Costin Jr. Post Office Building =

- United States Post Office—Lynn Main
- U.S. National Register of Historic Places
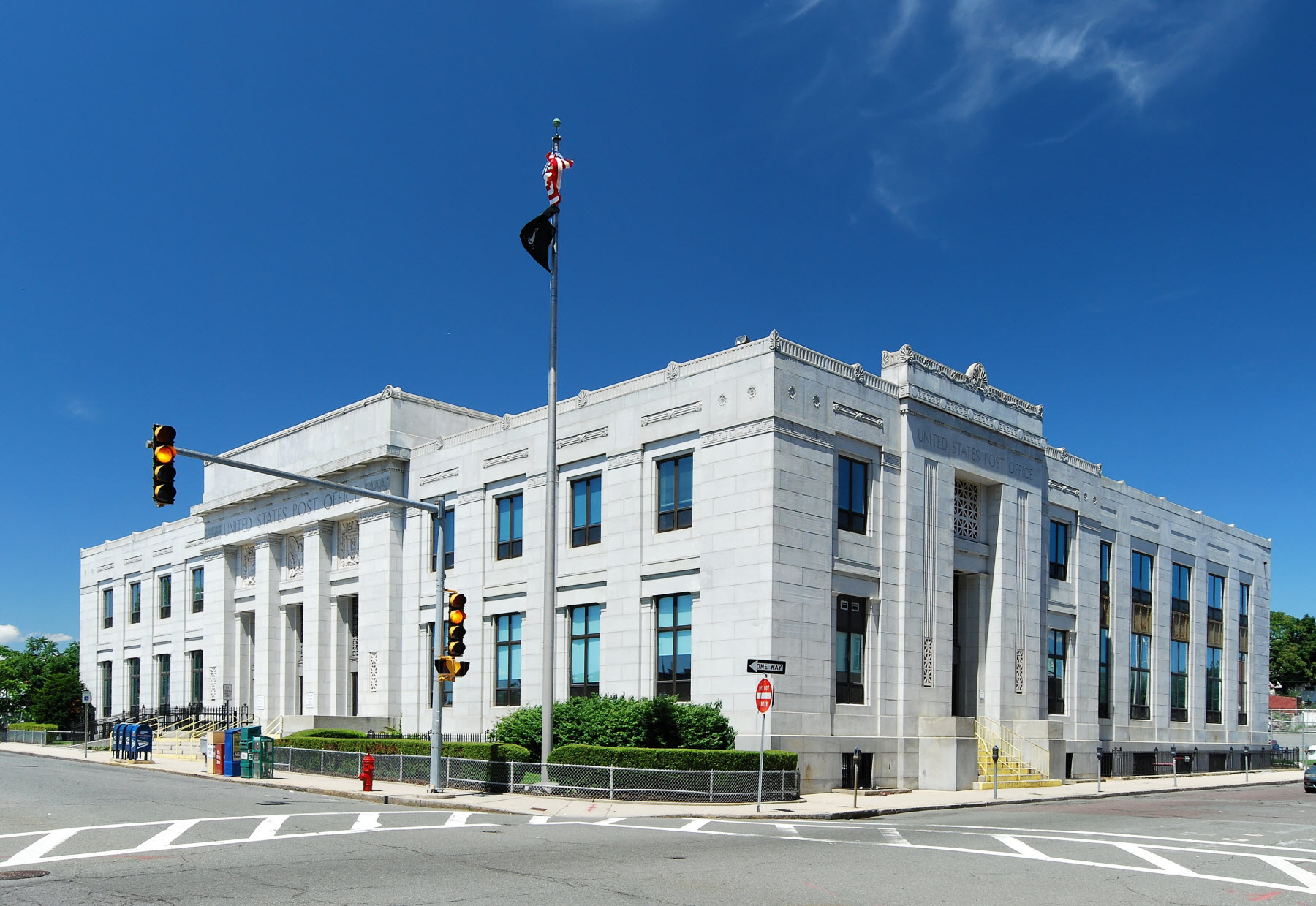

- Location within Massachusetts Location within the United States
- Location: 51 Willow St., Lynn, Massachusetts
- Coordinates: 42°27′54″N 70°56′46″W
- Built: 1933
- Architect: Edward H. Hoyt & Assoc.
- NRHP reference No.: 86001342
- Added to NRHP: June 20, 1986

The Thomas P. Costin Jr. Post Office Building, formerly known as the United States Post Office—Lynn Main is a historic post office building at 51 Willow Street in Lynn, Massachusetts. It still serves as Lynn's central post office. It was listed on the National Register of Historic Places in 1986.

== History ==
The United States Post Office—Lynn Main was built in 1933 at 51 Willow Street in Lynn, Massachusetts. It was designed by Edward H. Hoyt and Associates under James A. Wetmore. It was built by W. E. O'Neil Construction Company. Others who worked on the project include Richardson and Abbott, Ripley and LeBoutillier, William Riseman Associates, Robert L. Scagliotti, and Bulfinch Shepley.

The building was listed on the National Register of Historic Places on June 20, 1986.

In late 2018, the building was renamed the Thomas P. Costin Jr. Post Office Building by an Act of Congress in honor of Thomas P. Costin Jr., the 45th and youngest mayor of Lynn. Costin served as postmaster for the Lynn District from 1961 to 1992. The official dedication ceremony was held on May 24, 2019.

The building still serves as Lynn's central post office.

== Architecture ==
The two story granite Art Moderne building features a central three-bay entry pavilion that projects slightly from the facade. There are pilaster elements flanking and between the windows of this section. On either side of the entry are four-bay wings.

The building occupies the entire width of a city block. Inside, the lobby area is richly colored, with multiple shades of marble used on the floors and decorative wall and ceiling elements. It also retains a number of original features, such as writing desks and light fixtures.

== See also ==
- National Register of Historic Places listings in Lynn, Massachusetts
- National Register of Historic Places listings in Essex County, Massachusetts
- List of United States post offices
