= South Hadley, Massachusetts =

- Town
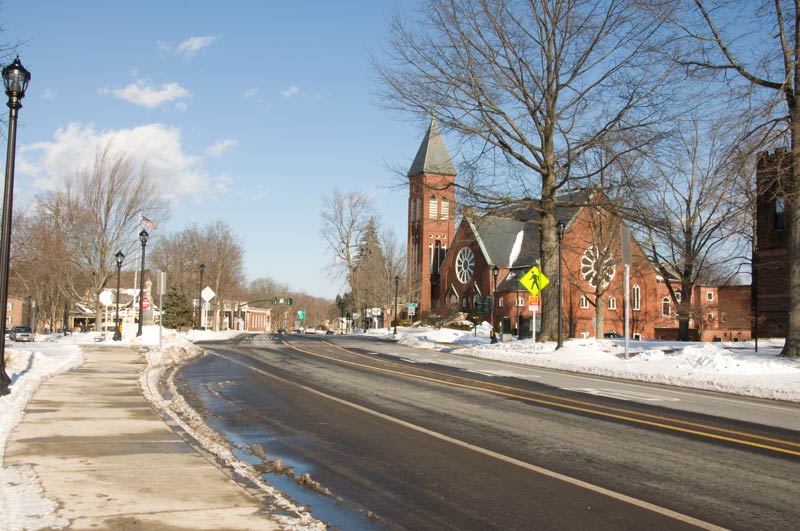
- The First Congregational Church and, in the background, the South Hadley Post Office and Village Commons

- Seal
- Motto: Agriculture, Education, Manufactures
- Location in Hampshire County in Massachusetts
- Coordinates: 42°15′30″N 72°34′30″W
- Country: United States
- State: Massachusetts
- County: Hampshire
- Settled: 1721
- Incorporated: 1775

Government
  - Type: Representative town meeting
  - Town Administrator: Lisa Wong

Area
  - Total: 18.4 sq mi (47.6 km^{2})
  - Land: 17.7 sq mi (45.9 km^{2})
  - Water: 0.69 sq mi (1.8 km^{2})
- Elevation: 256 ft (78 m)

Population (2020)
  - Total: 18,150
  - Density: 1,024/sq mi (395.4/km^{2})
- Time zone: UTC−5 (Eastern)
  - Summer (DST): UTC−4 (Eastern)
- ZIP Code: 01075
- Area code: 413
- FIPS code: 25-64145
- GNIS feature ID: 0618208
- Website: southhadley.org

South Hadley (/ˈhædliː/, HAD-lee) is a town in Hampshire County, Massachusetts, United States. The population was 18,150 at the 2020 census. It is part of the Springfield metropolitan area, Massachusetts. The town is south of Hadley, Massachusetts.

South Hadley is home to Mount Holyoke College, South Hadley High School, Pioneer Valley Performing Arts Charter Public School, and the Berkshire Hills Music Academy.

== History ==
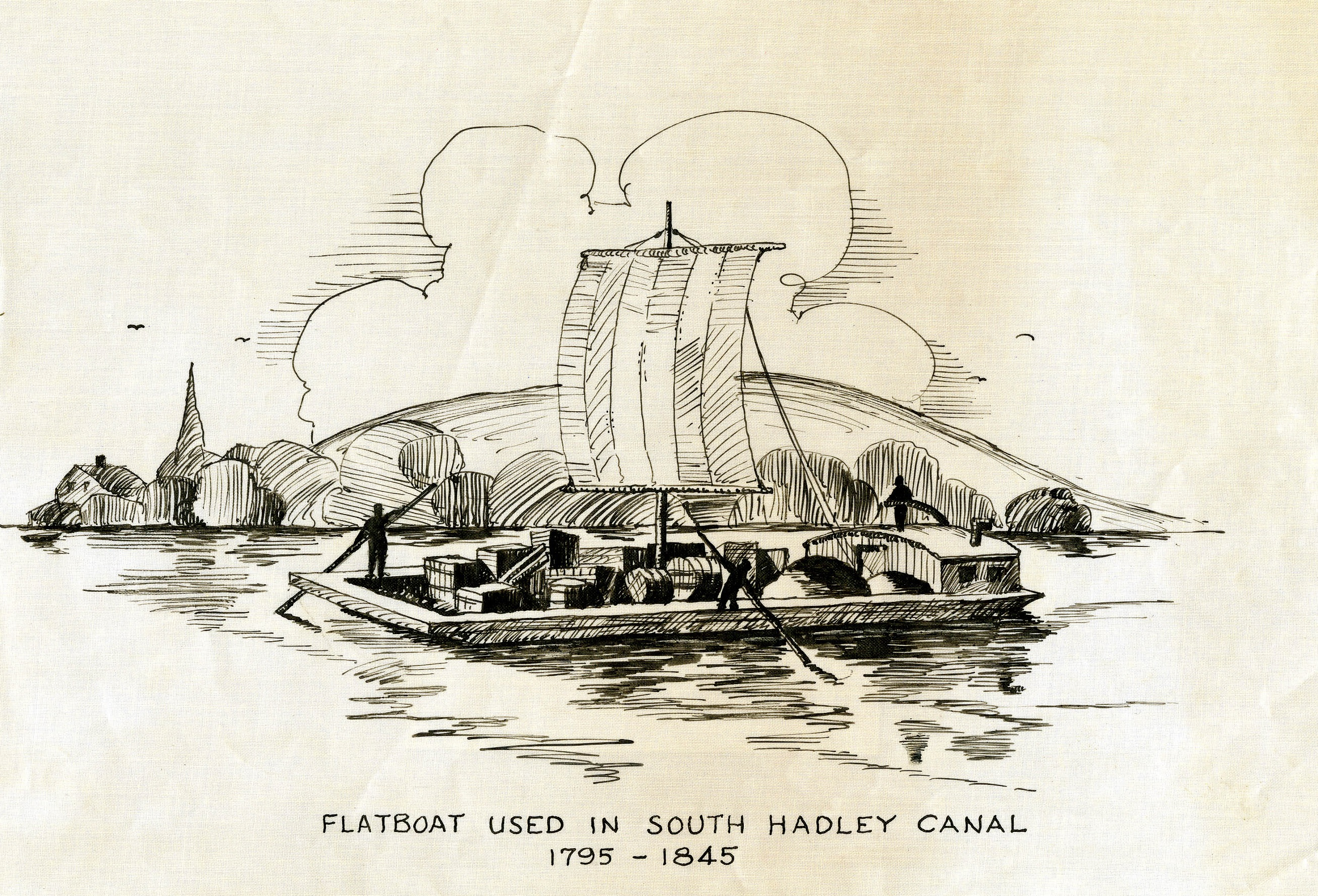
A flatboat typical of those used in the South Hadley Canal through the early 19th century

South Hadley was an unsettled area of Hadley from 1659 until 1721, when English settlers moved in from Hadley. A separate town meeting was held in 1753, and the town was officially split and incorporated in 1775.

The town is the home of the nation's first successful navigable canal as well as the oldest continuing institution of higher education for women (Mount Holyoke College).

The Civil War Monument (believed to be by Jerome Connor) in the center of the Commons was given to South Hadley by William H. Gaylord in the 1900s. The Gaylords also donated the Gaylord Memorial Library, located near the center of town, along with a grant of 67,000 dollars to Mount Holyoke College.

== Geography ==
South Hadley is located in the western part of Massachusetts, specifically in the Pioneer Valley. It is bordered on the north by Hadley and Amherst, on the east by Granby, and on the south by Chicopee. The Connecticut River defines the town's western border and separates it from the cities of Holyoke and Easthampton. South Hadley is 45 miles (72 km) south of Brattleboro, Vermont, 87 miles (140 km) west of Boston, and 145 miles (233 km) from New York City.

Although no interstate highways cross South Hadley's borders, U.S. Route 202 and Massachusetts Highways 33, 47, and 116 provide primary routes of transportation. Interstate 91 can be accessed in Holyoke while Interstate 90 is accessible through Chicopee. Westover Metropolitan Airport is located in neighboring Chicopee and offers air services throughout the region. Bradley International Airport, serving the greater Hartford–Springfield area, is located 17 miles (27 km) to the south. The closest Amtrak station is the Holyoke station.

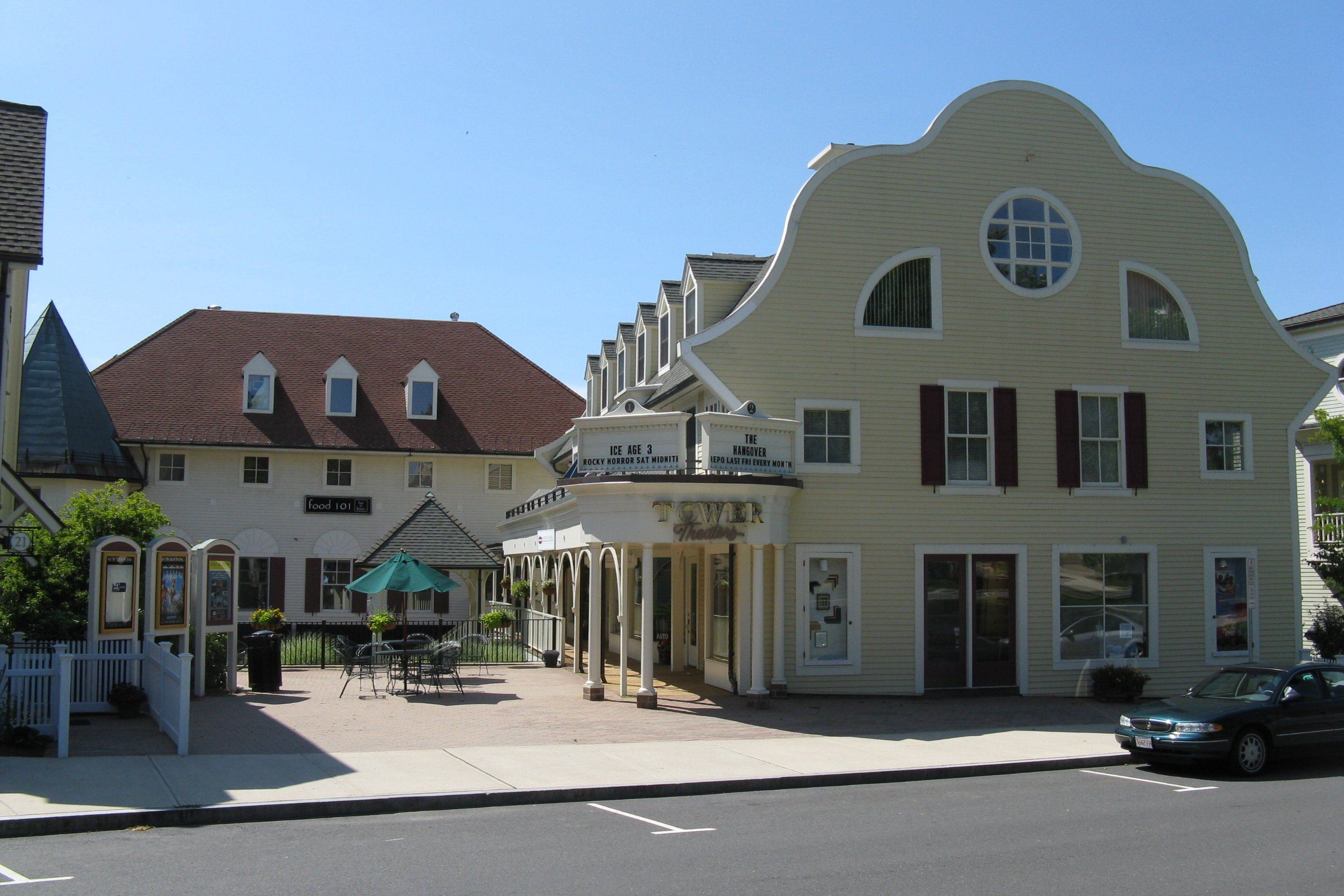
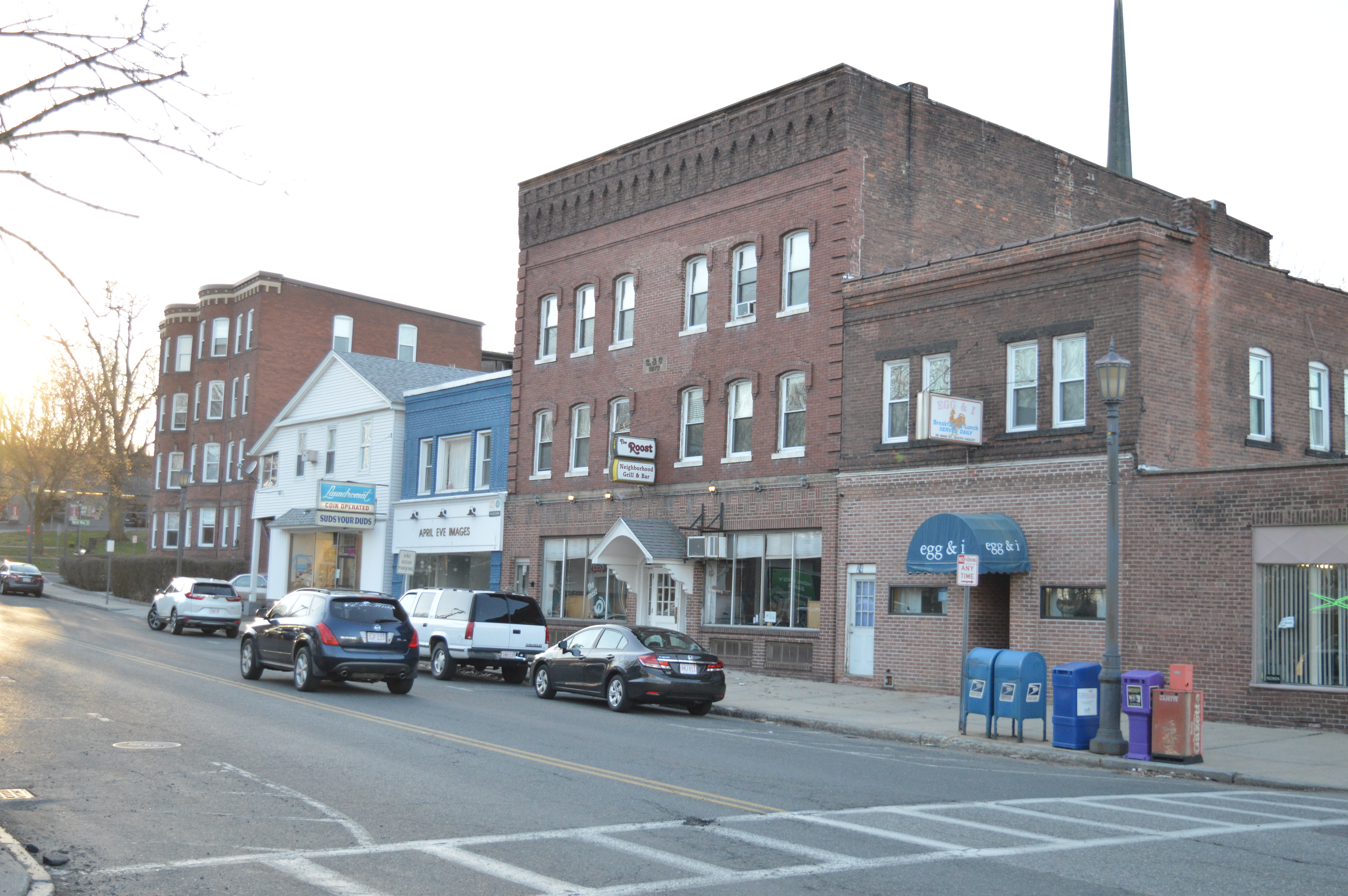
Commercial blocks in the Village Commons by Mount Holyoke College (top) and South Hadley Falls (bottom)

The Village Commons, a center for dining, shopping, and leisure, is located at the juncture of Massachusetts Routes 116 and 47, in the area commonly called South Hadley Center. Additional commercial centers are located on Massachusetts Route 33 and farther south on Route 116, including South Hadley Falls, which is across the river from Holyoke. South Hadley is also the home of Mount Holyoke College, the oldest continuously operating institution of higher education for women, founded in 1837.

According to the United States Census Bureau, the town has a total area of 18.4 square miles (48 km^{2}), of which 17.7 square miles (46 km^{2}) is land and 0.7 square miles (1.8 km^{2}) (3.70%) is water. The mountain range called the Holyoke Range or Mount Holyoke Range passes through the north of the town and separates it from Hadley and Amherst. There are 12 reservoirs in the town fed by eight distinct streams and six natural ponds.

=== Geology ===
The first confirmed evidence of a dinosaur to be found in North America was unearthed in South Hadley by Pliny Moody while plowing in 1802, 40 years before dinosaurs were identified as a fossil group. The sandstone slab bearing large, mysterious footprints was later purchased by Elihu Dwight, who gave the prints the name of "Noah's Raven". Professor Edward Hitchcock then obtained the slab, which is now on prominent display in the Beneski Museum of Natural History at Amherst College. Hitchcock believed the fossils were made by gigantic ancient birds, long before scientists accepted that modern birds and dinosaurs are related.

== Demographics ==
Historical population
Year	Pop.	±%
1790	759	—
1850	2,495	+228.7%
1860	2,277	−8.7%
1870	2,840	+24.7%
1880	3,538	+24.6%
1890	4,261	+20.4%
1900	4,526	+6.2%
1910	4,894	+8.1%
1920	5,527	+12.9%
1930	6,773	+22.5%
1940	6,856	+1.2%
1950	10,145	+48.0%
1960	14,956	+47.4%
1970	17,033	+13.9%
1980	16,399	−3.7%
1990	16,685	+1.7%
2000	17,196	+3.1%
2010	17,514	+1.8%
2020	18,150	+3.6%
2024*	18,031	−0.7%
* = population estimate. Source: United States census records and Population Estimates Program data.

As of the census of 2000, there were 17,196 people, 6,586 households, and 4,208 families residing in the town. The population density was 971.0 inhabitants per square mile (374.9/km^{2}). There were 6,784 housing units at an average density of 383.1 per square mile (147.9/km^{2}). The racial makeup of the town was 94.05% White, 1.20% African American, 0.12% Native American, 2.53% Asian, 0.06% Pacific Islander, 0.77% from other races, and 1.28% from two or more races. Hispanic or Latino of any race were 2.36% of the population.

There were 6,586 households, out of which 26.5% had children under the age of 18 living with them, 51.6% were married couples living together, 9.3% had a female householder with no husband present, and 36.1% were non-families. Of all households, 30.4% were made up of individuals, and 13.7% had someone living alone who was 65 years of age or older. The average household size was 2.33 and the average family size was 2.93.

In the town, the population was spread out, with 19.6% under the age of 18, 14.9% from 18 to 24, 25.6% from 25 to 44, 22.4% from 45 to 64, and 17.4% who were 65 years of age or older. The median age was 38 years. For every 100 females, there were 72.1 males. For every 100 females age 18 and over, there were 65.8 males.

The median income for a household in the town was $46,678, and the median income for a family was $58,693. Males had a median income of $42,256 versus $31,219 for females. The per capita income for the town was $22,732. About 4.1% of families and 5.9% of the population were below the poverty line, including 5.8% of those under age 18 and 7.2% of those age 65 or over.

== Economy ==
Although South Hadley's economy has changed greatly in the last two centuries, reflecting the trends of the Commonwealth and country, today it still retains businesses in agriculture, education, and manufacturing. With Mount Holyoke College being by far the largest employer in the area, a number of other contractors, service providers, and businesses support the college. Additionally the area maintains a small agricultural sector with several farms, and is home to several small machine shops and manufacturing firms, including a research and manufacturing facility of the E Ink Corporation.

== Education ==
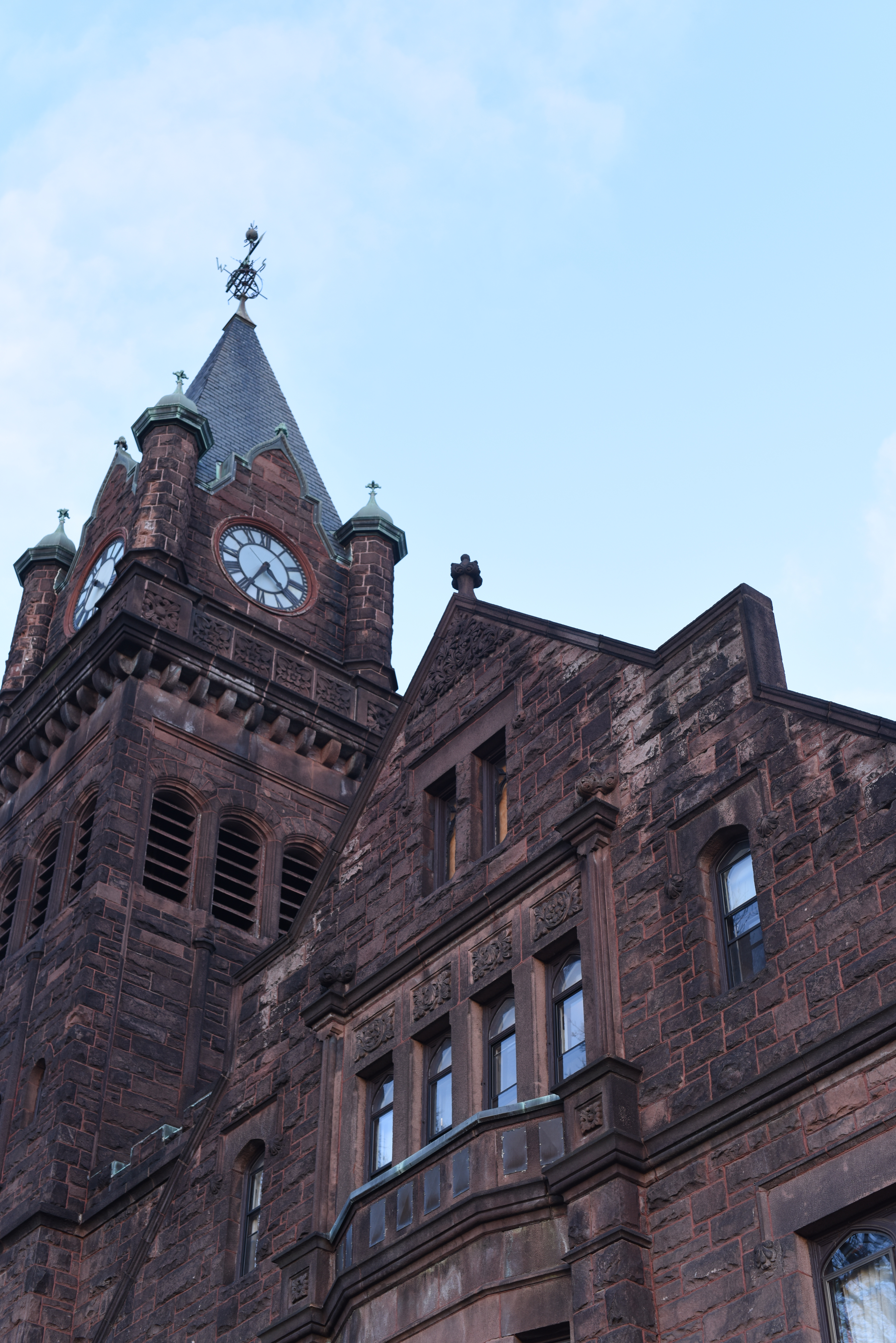
Mount Holyoke College campus in South Hadley, winter 2016.

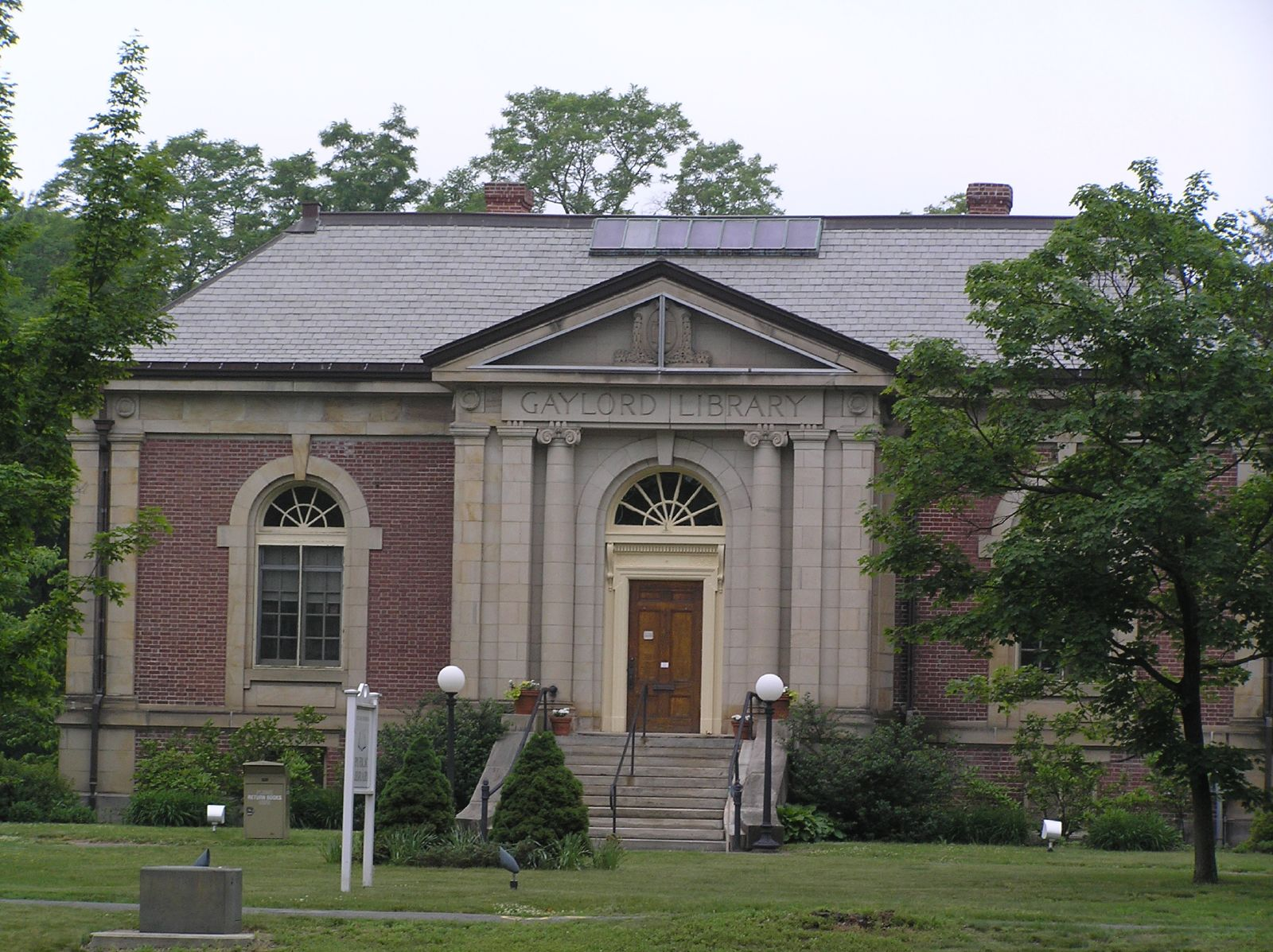
Gaylord Memorial Library

Mount Holyoke College, a member of the Five College Consortium, and the oldest of the Seven Sisters colleges, is located in South Hadley.

South Hadley High School is home of the 2004 state champion lacrosse team that won Division II with the smallest high school enrollment of all 81 teams. It is also home of the 2022 Division IV Boys Soccer State Champions, as well as the 2019 Division III Girls Soccer State Champions. It also won the 2005 Division IA Super Bowl in football. The 2008 boys' golf team won the Division 1 state championship. The Tigers Hockey team, composed of students from Holyoke, Granby, and South Hadley High Schools, has won WMass Championships in 1989,2009,2010,2011,2012, and 2017 as well as the 2009 and 2011 Massachusetts Division IIIA Ice Hockey State Championship. The South Hadley football team won the Division II Super Bowl vs. Putnum in 2010 after completing a season with only one loss to Division I for Longmeadow. The baseball team won the Division II Massachusetts' state championship in 2012.

The South Hadley High School Marching Band has competed in the state and/or New England USSBA Championship each year. In 2005 they placed second nationally and won Best Percussion. In 2006 they won the United States Marine Corps Esprit De corps award, second place in USSBA, and Best Percussion. In 2007 they took the best percussion for the third year in a row, Massachusetts USSBA championship, New England Championship, and seventh place in the Northern States championship. In 2008 they repeated as best percussion (for the fourth straight year) and seventh place in the Northern States championship. South Hadley continues to have one of the only competitive marching band programs in all of Western Massachusetts.

Pioneer Valley Performing Arts Charter Public School is a public charter school located in South Hadley, focusing in the performing arts.

Berkshire Hills Music Academy (BHMA), founded in 1999 and opened in 2001, is a private post-secondary residential school for young adults with learning or developmental disabilities. The school is located on 40 acres (16 ha) at the former Joseph Skinner estate.

== Notable people ==
- Daniel T. Barry, retired NASA astronaut; contestant on the CBS reality television program Survivor: Panama-Exile Island
- Gerald Warner Brace (1901–1978), American writer, educator, sailor and boat builder
- Joseph Brodsky (1940–1996), Russian poet and essayist, who began teaching at Mount Holyoke in 1974. For the last fifteen years of his life until his death in 1996, he was Andrew W. Mellow Professor of Literature at the college. He died at the age of fifty-five. He was a recipient of the Nobel Prize for Literature in 1987 and was appointed United States poet laureate in 1991
- Joseph Goodhue Chandler (1813–1884), portrait painter
- Alfred C. Chapin (1848–1936), lawyer, Congressman, and mayor of Brooklyn, New York 1888–1891
- Donald R. Dwight (born 1931), Lieutenant Governor of Massachusetts from 1971 to 1975
- Joe Farnsworth (born 1968), jazz drummer
- A. Bartlett Giamatti (1938–1989), the seventh commissioner of Major League Baseball and former president of Yale University
- Mary Lyon (1797–1849), educator, founder of the female seminaries which became Mount Holyoke College and Wheaton College
- George Herbert Mead (1863–1931), American philosopher, sociologist and psychologist, primarily affiliated with the University of Chicago, where he was one of several distinguished pragmatists. He is regarded as one of the founders of social psychology
- Nellie Neilson (1873-1947), historian and educator
- Phoebe Prince (1994–2010), teenage girl who was bullied and committed suicide as a result
- Erastus G. Smith (1855–1937), member of the Wisconsin State Assembly and Dean of Beloit College
- Peter Viereck (1916–2006), American poet, political thinker, and professor of history at Mount Holyoke College
- Lesley Visser (born 1953), the first woman to be recognized by the Pro Football Hall of Fame as the 2006 recipient of the Pete Rozelle Radio-Television Award. During her 40-year career in sports journalism she has worked for The Boston Globe, ESPN, ABC Sports, and CBS Sports
- Edwin White (1817–1877), American painter
- Phineas White (1770–1847), United States Representative from Vermont
- Benjamin Ruggles Woodbridge (1739–1819), doctor, colonel of the Massachusetts militia during the American Revolutionary War, and a member of the Massachusetts legislature

== See also ==
- United States Post Office—South Hadley Main
- Woodbridge Street Historic District
