= Main Street Historic District (Easthampton, Massachusetts) =

Historic district in Massachusetts, United States

- U.S. National Register of Historic Places
- U.S. Historic district
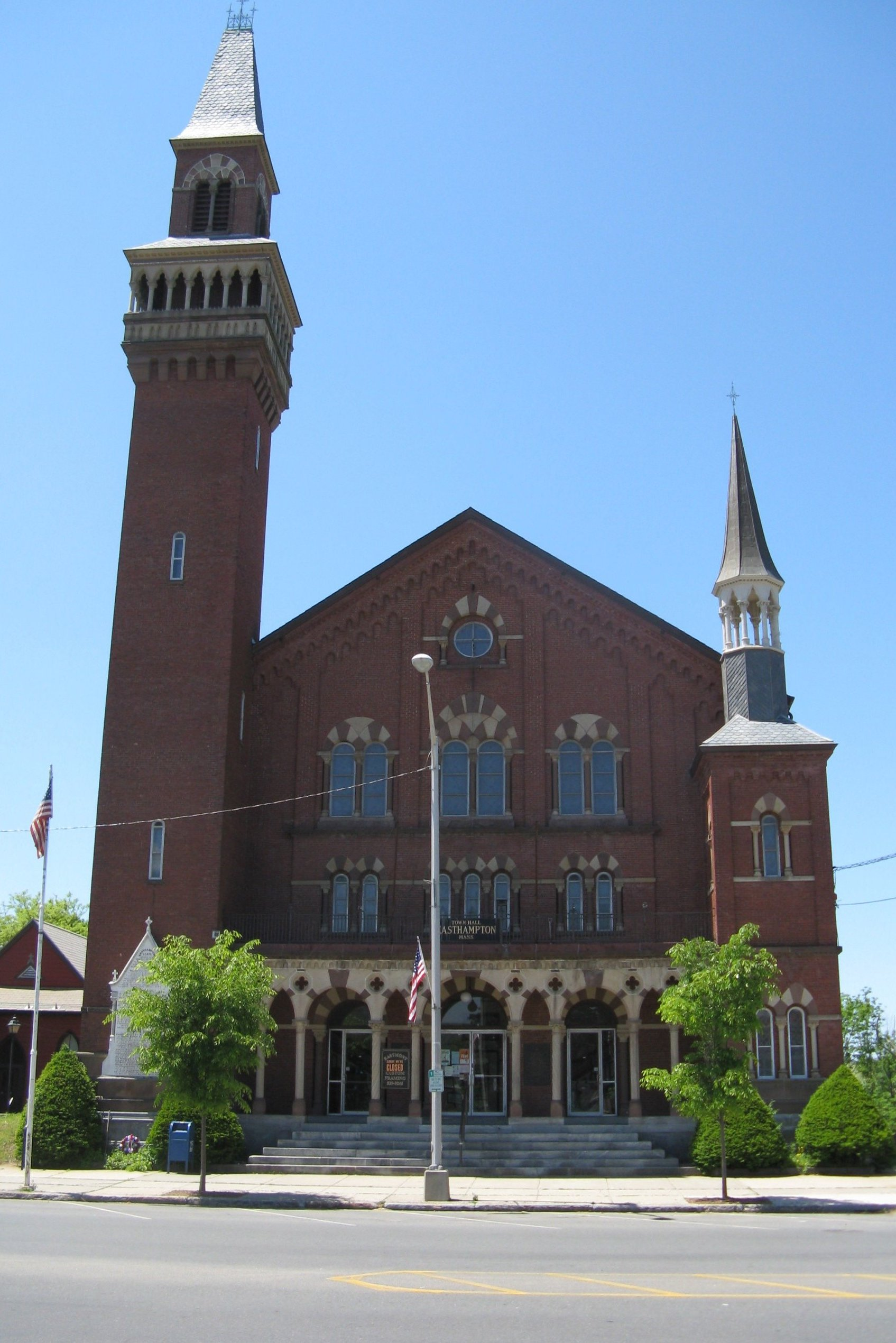
- Town Hall

- Location within Massachusetts Location within the United States
- Location: Main St., Easthampton, Massachusetts
- Coordinates: 42°16′11″N 72°40′22″W
- Area: 45 acres (18 ha)
- Architect: Multiple
- Architectural style: Greek Revival, Mixed (more Than 2 Styles From Different Periods), Queen Anne
- NRHP reference No.: 86000451
- Added to NRHP: March 17, 1986

The Main Street Historic District of Easthampton, Massachusetts encompasses the historic heart of the town, running along Main Street between Northampton and Center Streets. The area has been the civic and economic heart of the town since incorporation in 1785. Most of the commercial buildings date from the 1840s to the 1880s, and are built in an Italianate style. The housing stock of the district also includes Italianate styling, but there are also a number of Greek Revival structures. The major civic structures of the town are in the district, including the town hall (brick, Italianate, built in 1869 by Boston architect Charles E. Parker), public library (designed in 1881 by Peabody & Stearns in the Old English style), and the First Congregational Church, which is the second for the congregation, a brick Romanesque Revival building dating to 1851. The district was added to the National Register of Historic Places in 1986.

Easthampton was settled in the early 18th century, and was separately incorporated out of parts of Northampton and Southampton in 1786. At first economically an agricultural community, its town center developed around its first meeting house, located about 1/4-mile south of the Manhan River, where an early gristmill and settlement were located. Substantial growth in the town center began in the 1840s, when a boys' seminary was founded, and a button factory was founded on a tributary of the Manhan River southeast of the center, which was dammed to form what is now called Nashawannuck Pond . This was the seed of a corridor of industrial development just east of the center, which grew in the mid-19th century along with this economic growth.

== See also ==
- National Register of Historic Places listings in Hampshire County, Massachusetts
- United States Post Office–Easthampton Main
- Nashawannuck Mills Historic District
