= United States Post Office–Easthampton Main =

- US Post Office–Easthampton Main
- U.S. National Register of Historic Places
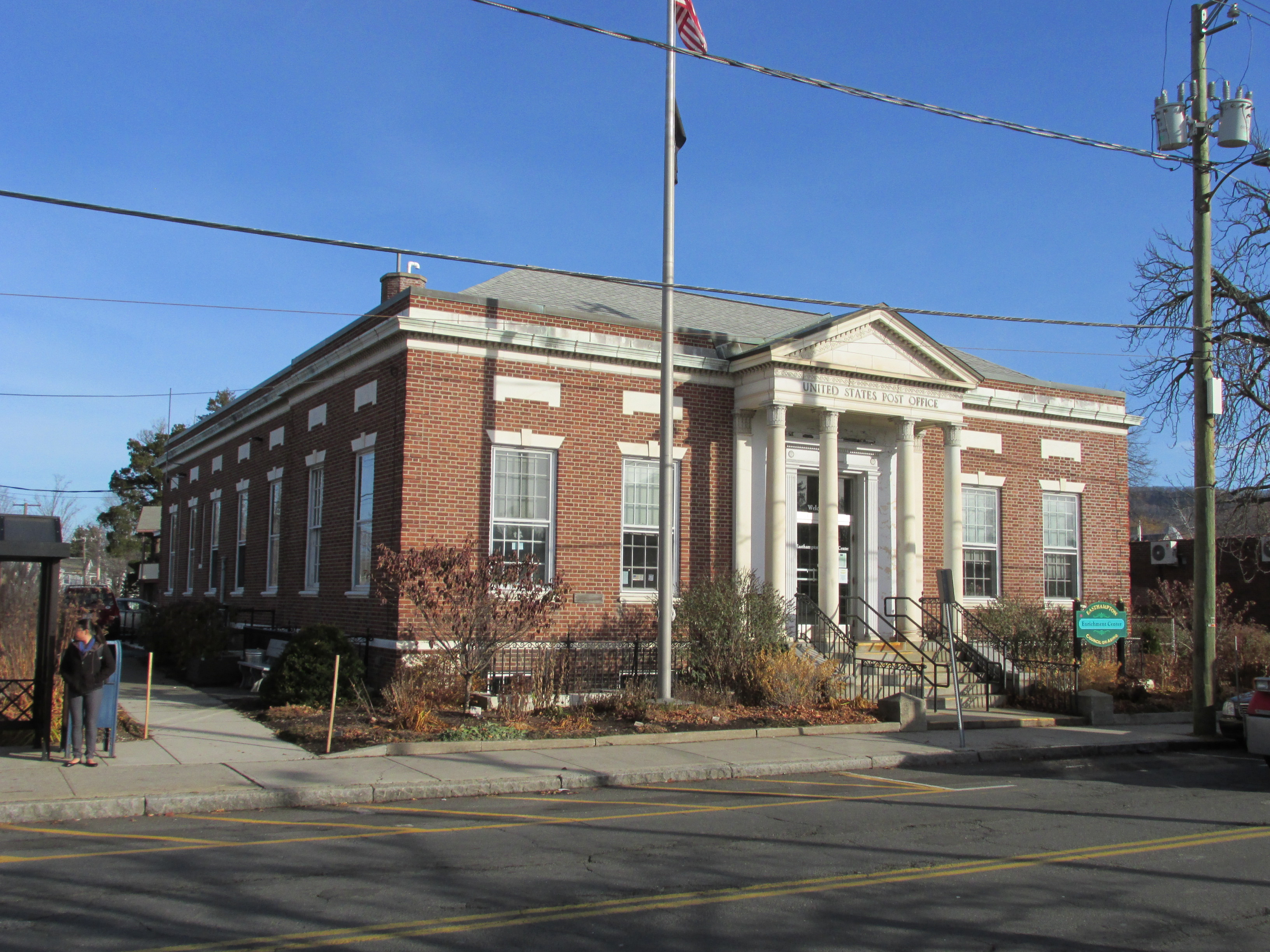
- US Post Office-Easthampton Main

- Location within Massachusetts Location within the United States
- Location: 19 Union St., Easthampton, Massachusetts
- Coordinates: 42°16′10″N 72°40′19″W
- Area: less than one acre
- Built: 1933
- Architect: Simon, Louis A.
- Architectural style: Classical Revival
- NRHP reference No.: 86000714
- Added to NRHP: April 1, 1986

The US Post Office—Easthampton Main is a historic post office building at 19 Union Street in Easthampton, Massachusetts. Built in 1933, this Classical Revival building is one of the town center's most architecturally sophisticated buildings. The building was listed on the National Register of Historic Places in 1986. It is currently being used as a senior center.

== Description and history ==
The former Easthampton Post Office building is located in Easthampton's town center, at the southeast corner of Union and High Streets. It is a single-story masonry structure, built of red brick with limestone trim. The main entrance is at the center of the Union Street facade, sheltered by a four-column Corinthian portico with entablature and fully pedimented gable. The entrance has an elaborate limestone surround, with modern glass-and-aluminum doors. Windows are set in rectangular openings with keystoned lintels. The interior lobby space retains original finishes, including marble flooring and service windows with metal grillwork.

The Neo-Classical single story building was built in 1933 for a cost (of land and construction) of about $75,000. The supervising architect was Louis A. Simon. The building design resembles the work of Knox Taylor, who designed a number of post offices earlier in the 20th century. It was one of 180 post offices built in 1933 by the federal government under a jobs relief program during the Great Depression.

== See also ==
- Main Street Historic District (Easthampton, Massachusetts), which the building lies not far outside of
- National Register of Historic Places listings in Hampshire County, Massachusetts
- List of United States post offices
