= The Town Farm =

- U.S. National Register of Historic Places
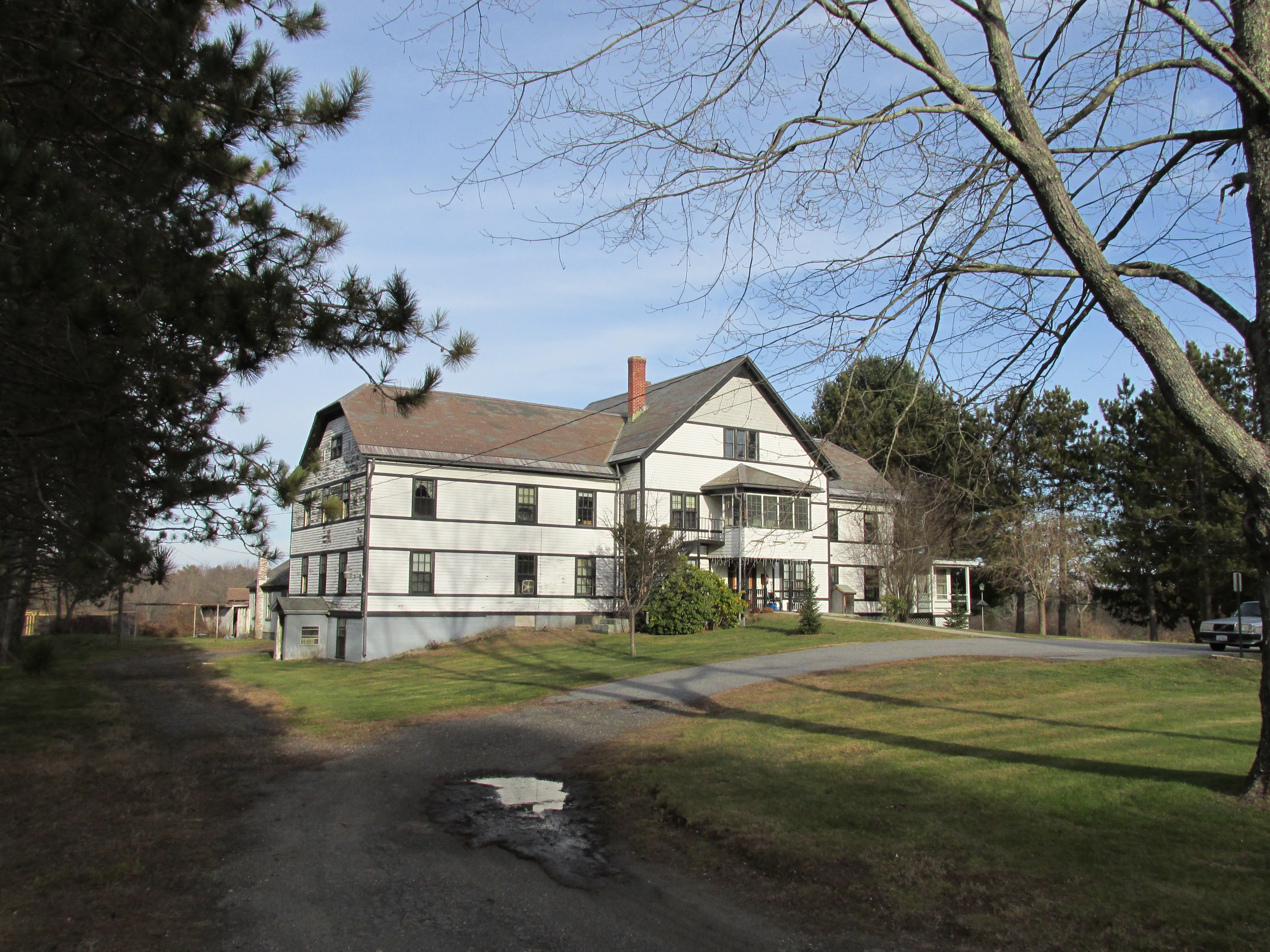
- The Town Farm

- Location within Massachusetts Location within the United States
- Location: 75 Oliver St., Easthampton, Massachusetts
- Coordinates: 42°16′50″N 72°41′51″W
- Area: 56 acres (23 ha)
- Architect: Pratt, W.F., & Son
- Architectural style: Shingle Style, Queen Anne
- NRHP reference No.: 96000950
- Added to NRHP: September 12, 1996

The Town Farm, now the Easthampton Lodging House, is a historic poor farm at 75 Oliver Street in Easthampton, Massachusetts. It was established in 1890 as an inexpensive way to provide for the town's indigent population, and is the only locally run facility of its type to survive in the state. The property was listed on the National Register of Historic Places in 1996.

== Description and history ==
Easthampton's former town farm is located in a rural setting west of downtown Easthampton, on the north side of Oliver Street opposite Hollister Drive. The main building was built in a manner typical of earlier Greek Revival poorhouses: a central five-bay 2-1/2 story main block was flanked by residential wings. This structure, however, includes Craftsman and Queen Anne details more typical of the late 19th century. The building exterior has only received modest alterations since its construction, the most notable being an addition to the west wing made by the Works Progress Administration in the 1930s.

Poor farms were a typical means by which communities provided for their indigent poor in the 19th century. This facility was established by the town in 1890, and originally included a wider array of agricultural buildings. The facility was operated as a farm until 1955, at which time the town sold of the agricultural equipment of the farm, and leased the agricultural land to local farmers. In 1974 the facility was formally named the "Town Lodging House". The town resisted an effort to bring the facility under state control in 1986; it remains the only facility of its type under local control in the state.

== See also ==
- National Register of Historic Places listings in Hampshire County, Massachusetts
