= Manhan River =

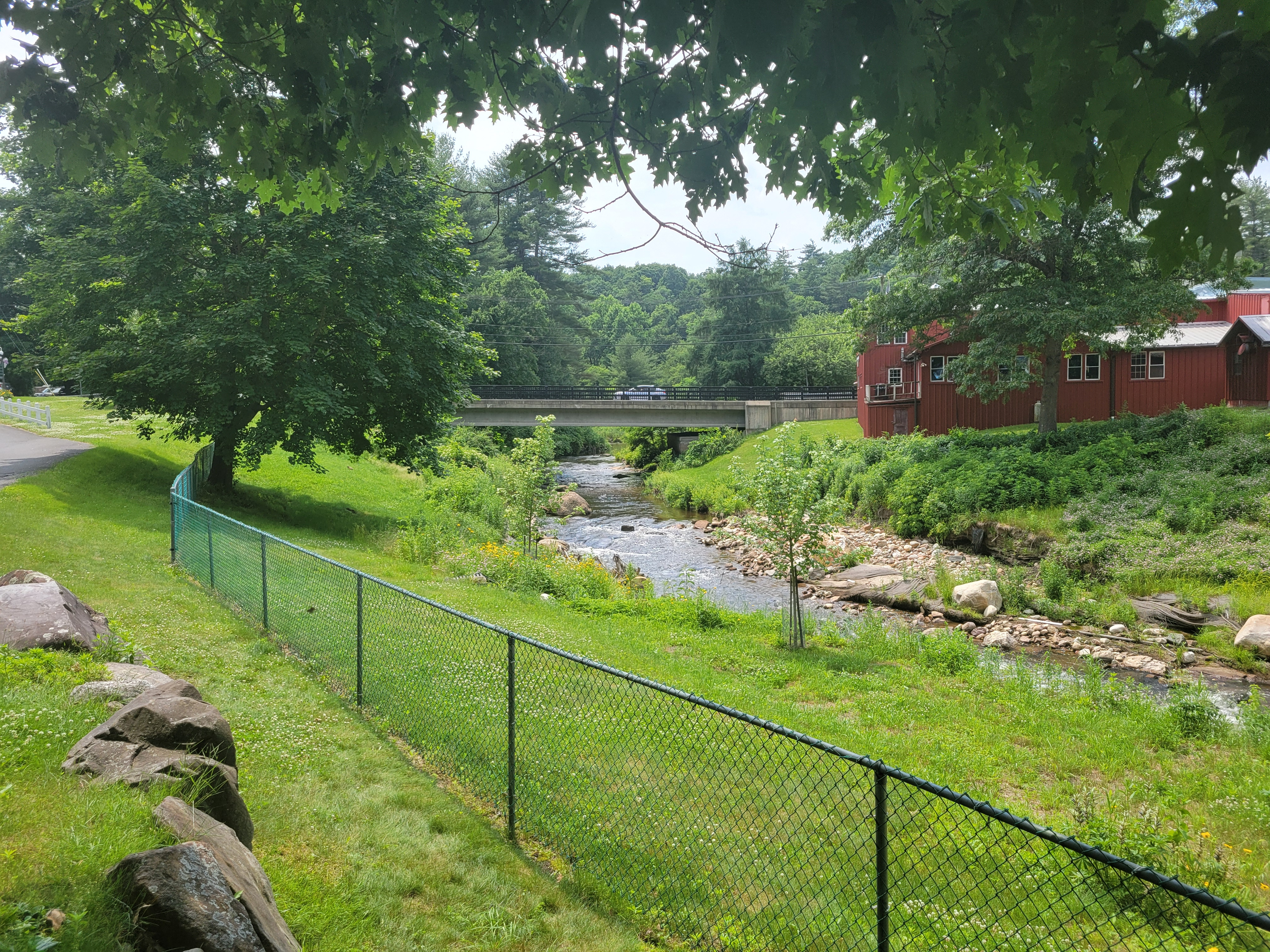

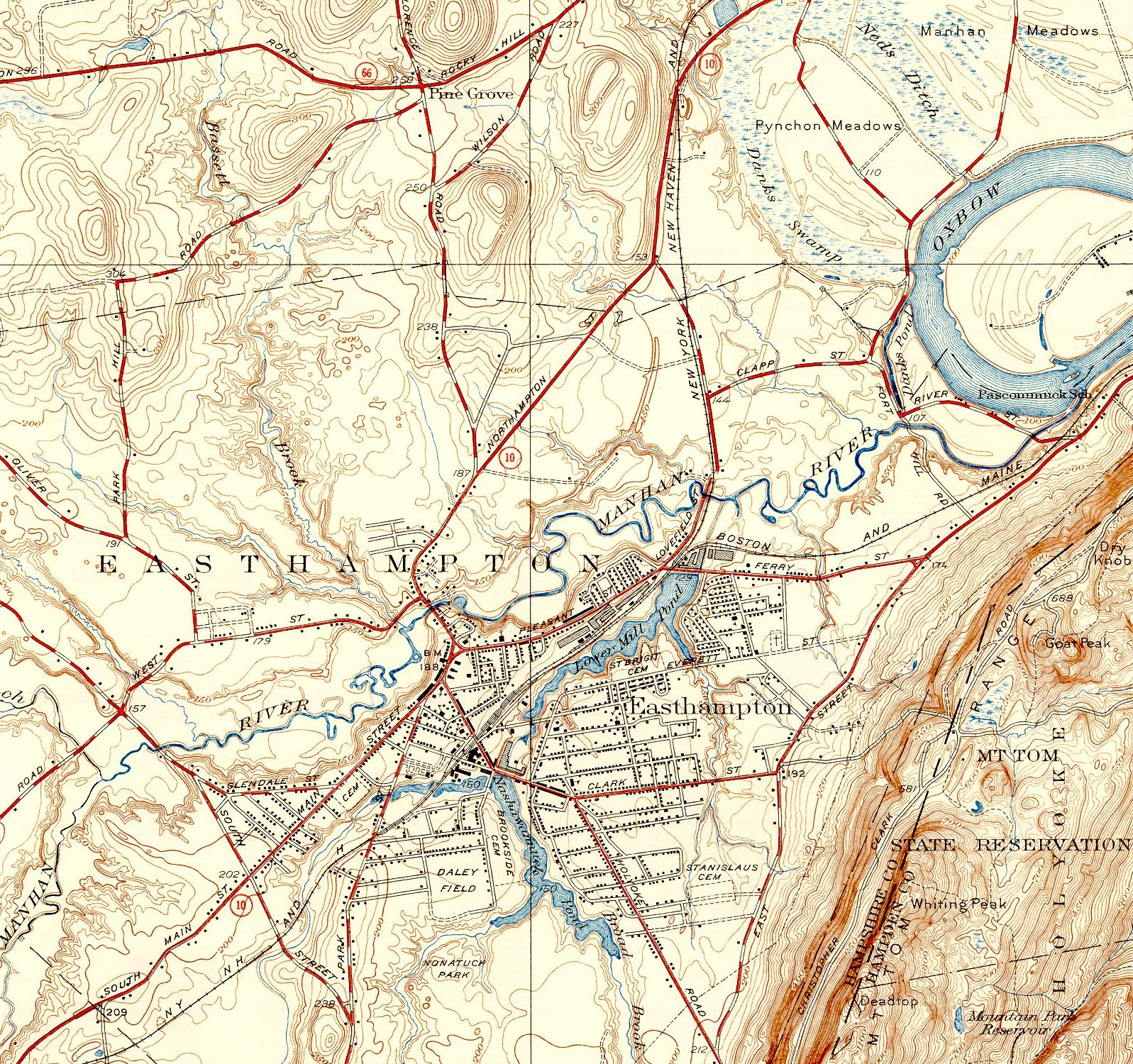
- Manhan River, lower stretch

Location
- Country: United States
- State: Massachusetts
- County: Hampshire

Physical characteristics
- Source
  - coordinates: 42.3176°N 72.8216°W
- Mouth
  - location: Connecticut River, near Easthampton, MA
  - coordinates: 42.2840°N 72.6295°W
- Length: 27.6 mi (44.4 km)

The Manhan River is a 27.6-mile-long (44.4 km) river in western Massachusetts. It is a tributary of the Connecticut River.

The river begins near the boundary between the towns of Huntington and Westhampton, Massachusetts, and flows southeast to White Reservoir and then Tighe Carmody Reservoir in Southampton. The river continues southeast, then turns northeasterly and flows through the middle of Easthampton to its confluence with the Connecticut River at a westward curve called The Oxbow. The river provides excellent views of nearby Mount Tom.

Europeans first settled the area in 1664 and later established saw mills on the river. In 1847 large mills began with the Williston-Knight Button Company; a number of other factories sprang up nearby in the next few years. Small lead mines also were established near the river. Of particular note is the Manhan River mine near Loudville, noted for its pyromorphite and wulfenite. A former railroad has been converted to the Manhan Rail Trail, which now provides a scenic pathway along the river.

== See also ==
- List of rivers of Massachusetts
