= Easthampton High School =

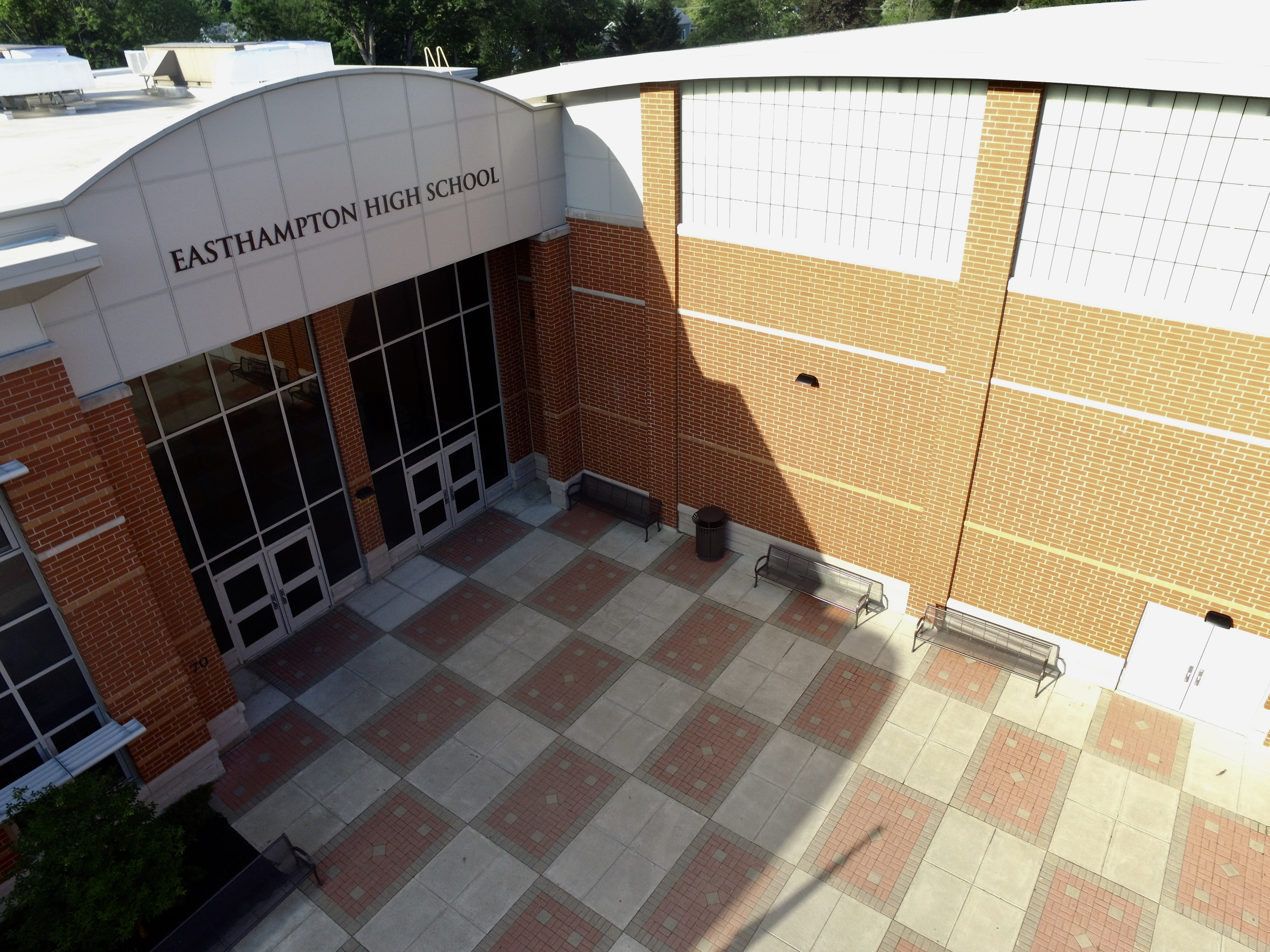
- Aerial photograph of Easthampton High School in 2017

Location
- 70 Williston Ave; Easthampton, MA 01027; USA
- Coordinates: 42°15′38″N 72°40′17″W

Information
- School type: Secondary
- Opened: 2013
- School district: Easthampton Public Schools
- NCES District ID: 2504590
- Superintendent: Maureen Binienda (Interim)
- NCES School ID: 250459000612
- Principal: William Evans
- Teaching staff: 38.44 FTE
- Grades: 9–12
- Gender: Coeducational
- Enrollment: 377 (2024-2025)
- Student to teacher ratio: 9.81
- Colors: Maroon and white
- Mascot: Eagles

Easthampton High School is a public, coeducational secondary school, located in and serving the community of Easthampton, Massachusetts. The school is administrated by a principal, William Evans, who responds to the Interim Easthampton Public Schools District Superintendent, Maureen Binienda.

The school was the subject of controversy in March 2017, when their disciplinary policies were investigated by the Massachusetts Attorney General for racial discrimination.

== Demographics ==
According to Massachusetts Department of Elementary and Secondary Education annual statistics, for the 2023–2024 academic year, the demographic enrollment distributions for race, gender and grade level at Easthampton High School are as follows:

Total number of enrolled students: 373
Total number of full-time equivalent educators: 33.7
Therefore, the student to teacher ratio for this school is 11.1:1

Enrollment by Race/Ethnicity (2023–2024)
Race	Enrolled Pupils*	% of District
African American	3	0.8%
Asian	16	4.3%
Hispanic	65	17.4%
Native American	1	0.3%
White	275	73.7%
Native Hawaiian, Pacific Islander	0	0%
Multi-Race, Non-Hispanic	13	3.5%
Total	373	100%

* Approximate number of enrolled pupils is calculated based on total number of students in district, multiplied by reported percentage, and rounded to nearest whole student.

Enrollment by gender (2023–2024)
Gender	Enrolled pupils	Percentage
Female	181	48.53%
Male	185	49.6%
Non-binary	7	1.88%
Total	373	100%

Enrollment by Grade
Grade	Pupils Enrolled	Percentage
9	102	27.35%
10	86	23.06%
11	93	24.93%
12	91	24.4%
SP*	1	0.27%
Total	373	100%

* SP = Special Education Beyond Grade 12
