= Easthampton Public Schools =

Easthampton, Massachusetts school district

Address
- 50 Payson Ave Easthampton, Massachusetts, 01027; United States
- Coordinates: 42.2654214, −72.6695239

District information
- Type: Public
- Grades: K – 12
- Superintendent: Michelle Balch
- Governing agency: Easthampton School Committee; City of Easthampton
- Schools: 5, including Easthampton High School
- NCES District ID: 2504590
- District ID: MA DOE 00860000

Students and staff
- Students: 1,445
- Teachers: 115.7 FTE
- Student–teacher ratio: 12.5∶1

Other information
- Website: https://epsd.us/

The Easthampton Public Schools district is the sole Public School District serving the city of Easthampton, Massachusetts. Administrated by superintendent Michelle Balch, the district serves grades PK–12 across 5 schools, including Easthampton High School. The district is governed by a seven-person, elected school committee, inclusive of the mayor who serves as a voting member.

== Demographics ==
Per Massachusetts Department of Elementary and Secondary Education annual statistics for the 2020–2021 academic year, the Easthampton Public Schools district accommodates 1,443 pupils from grades PK-12, with an additional two Special education students beyond the 12th grade, totaling 1,445 overall.

Enrollment by Race/Ethnicity (2020–2021)
Race	Enrolled Pupils*	% of District
African American	17	1.2%
Asian	48	3.3%
Hispanic	207	14.3%
Native American	4	0.3%
White	1,113	77.0%
Native Hawaiian, Pacific Islander	1	0.1%
Multi-Race, Non-Hispanic	55	3.8%
Total	1,445	100%

* Approximate number of enrolled pupils is calculated based on total number of students in district, multiplied by reported percentage, and rounded to nearest whole student.

Enrollment by Grade (2020–2021)
School	PK	K	1	2	3	4	5	6	7	8	9	10	11	12	SP	Total
Easthampton High	—	—	—	—	—	—	—	—	—	—	97	101	111	108	2	419
White Brook Middle	—	—	—	—	—	—	126	110	92	114	—	—	—	—	—	442
Center	—	38	40	39	36	39	—	—	—	—	—	—	—	—	—	192
Neil A. Pepin	—	37	38	36	38	39	—	—	—	—	—	—	—	—	—	188
Maple	22	34	39	41	33	35	—	—	—	—	—	—	—	—	—	204
District Total	22	109	117	116	107	113	126	110	92	114	97	101	111	108	2	1,445
