= Nashawannuck Mills Historic District =

Historic district in Massachusetts, United States

- U.S. National Register of Historic Places
- U.S. Historic district
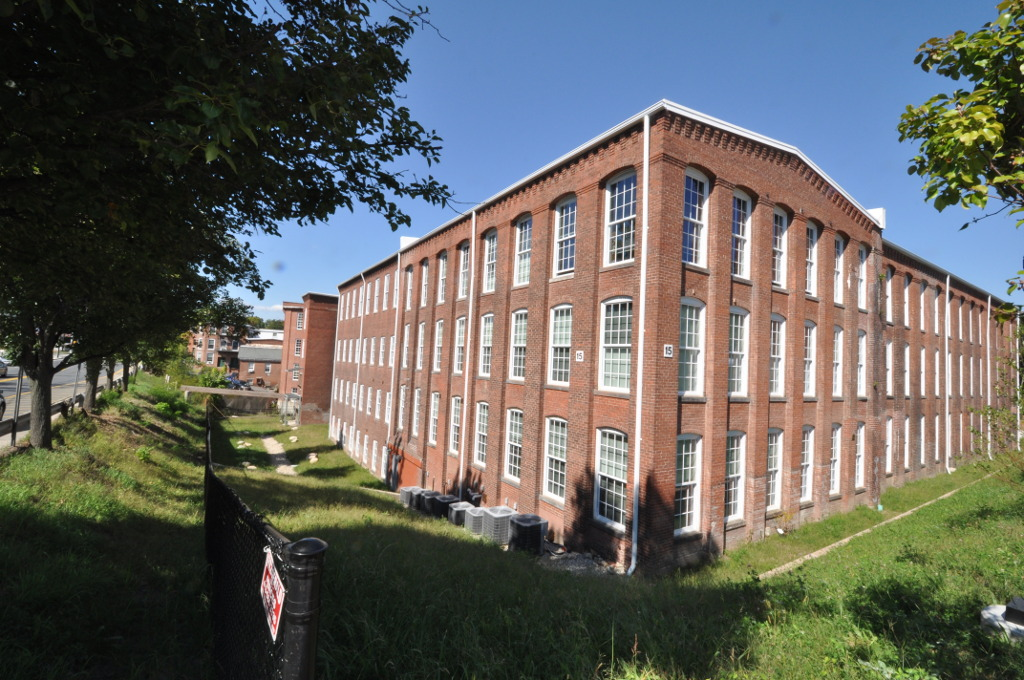

- Location within Massachusetts Location within the United States
- Location: 1–15 Cottage Street, Easthampton, Massachusetts
- Coordinates: 42°15′57″N 72°40′2″W
- Area: 4.4 acres (1.8 ha)
- Built: 1848
- NRHP reference No.: 15000001
- Added to NRHP: February 12, 2015

The Nashawannuck Mills Historic District of Easthampton, Massachusetts encompasses a 19th-century industrial complex on Cottage Street in the heart of the town. Most of the connected series of brick buildings were built between about 1848 and 1870, although the facilities were used for industrial purposes until 1970. The oldest building erected was by Samuel Williston for a button factory. Powered by a dam that impounded Bound Brook, the facility expanded in both size and function, eventually becoming a major producer of elastic fabrics for goods such as suspenders and webbing. The industrial works were the major economic engine in Easthampton into the 20th century. The district was listed on the National Register of Historic Places in 2015.

Samuel Williston, a native of Easthampton, began the manufacture of buttons as a cottage industry in the town in 1826. In 1847, he and business partners opened a button-making factory on Union Street, damming Bound Brook to use its power. The dam was eventually paged over to make Cottage Street. He eventually sold that business, and in 1850 opened a business manufacturing suspenders that was at first called the Williston Elastic Suspender Company, but was later renamed the Nashawannuck Manufacturing Company. This company built Building 10, the oldest in the complex. The company was highly successful, and by 1865 was Easthampton's largest employer. Williston expanded his businesses to include the manufacture of elastic webbing, and rubber parts for shoes, capitalizing in part on patent rights to the Goodyear rubber vulcanizing process. In 1862, that business began construction on an adjacent complex. These two businesses were combined in 1912 into single entity, and their industrial complexes were interconnected. The facilities were damaged by flooding in 1955 caused by Hurricane Diane, with the dam requiring repairs, and one of the buildings reconstructed.

The elastics business closed in 1970. Portions of the mill complex were used by other industrial concerns, while one side of the complex was given to Riverside Industries (RSI), a nonprofit providing work environment for disabled individuals. RSI continues to own part of the complex, leasing portions out to light industry and an artists cooperative.

== See also ==
- National Register of Historic Places listings in Hampshire County, Massachusetts
