= The Oxbow (Connecticut River) =

Body of water in the United States

Coordinates: 42.291025°N 72.629156°W

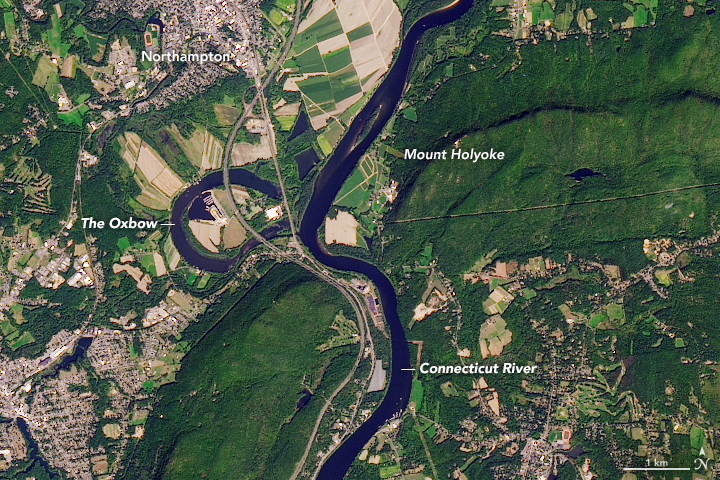
Connecticut River Oxbow from space, 2017

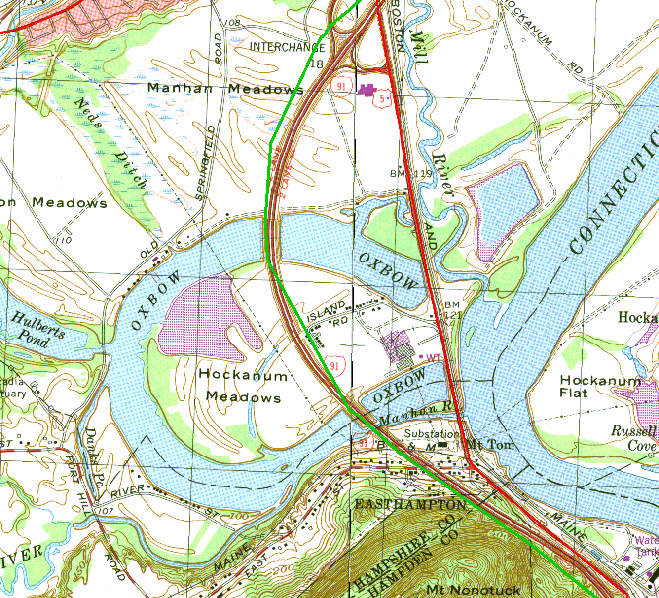
USGS topographic map of the Oxbow

The Oxbow, also known as the Ox-Bow, is an extension of the Connecticut River located in Northampton, Massachusetts. It was famously depicted in Thomas Cole's 1836 painting View from Mount Holyoke, Northampton, Massachusetts, after a Thunderstorm—The Oxbow.

== History ==
Historically, the Oxbow was connected directly to the Connecticut river as a large U-shaped bend. In 1840, flood waters cut through the narrow section, separating the Oxbow from the main river and the current. In the early 1900s, the Oxbow was used extensively for logging operations, as a holding area for logs sent down river. The northern end was later cut off to build Interstate 91, which runs between the Oxbow and the Connecticut River. The Connecticut River is still accessible by a channel made under the Interstate 91 and U.S. Route 5 bridges.

== Depictions ==
The Oxbow captured the imagination and attention of a broad set of artists over time. Thomas Cole described the scene as "well known" in 1836 as he began his large painting of The Oxbow. A depiction of what was called "Hockanum Bend" had appeared in 1826 in "The northern traveller; containing the routes to Niagara, Quebec, and the Springs," by Theodore Dwight. In 1835 an illustration was created by W. H. Bartlett and published in the book "American Scenery" by George Virtue in 1837. By the second half of the 19th century the Oxbow was photographed for stereo-views and by the turn of the late 19th and early 20th century was featured in postcards and other memorabilia.

== Wildlife ==
The Oxbow is a habitat for many migratory and resident bird species. The Arcadia Wildlife Sanctuary (a project of Mass Audubon) protects a total of 776 acres (314 ha) of land that forms the outer shore of the Oxbow. Among these species include bald eagle, snowy egret, cormorant, great blue heron, osprey, kingfisher, swifts, gulls, Canada geese, and ducks.

== Current use ==
The Oxbow is used today primarily for pleasure boating and is home to one of the largest marinas on the Connecticut River in Massachusetts. The Massachusetts Department of Conservation and Recreation operates a state boat ramp facility accessible from Route 5 in Easthampton, Massachusetts. Because it is partially separated from the main river body, boats are protected from strong current and floating debris. Other uses include flat water paddling and fishing. The Oxbow facilitates the Oxbow Water Ski Show Team, and used to be the home of Northampton Youth and Community Rowing, one of the larger scholastic and masters rowing clubs in western Massachusetts.

== Gallery ==
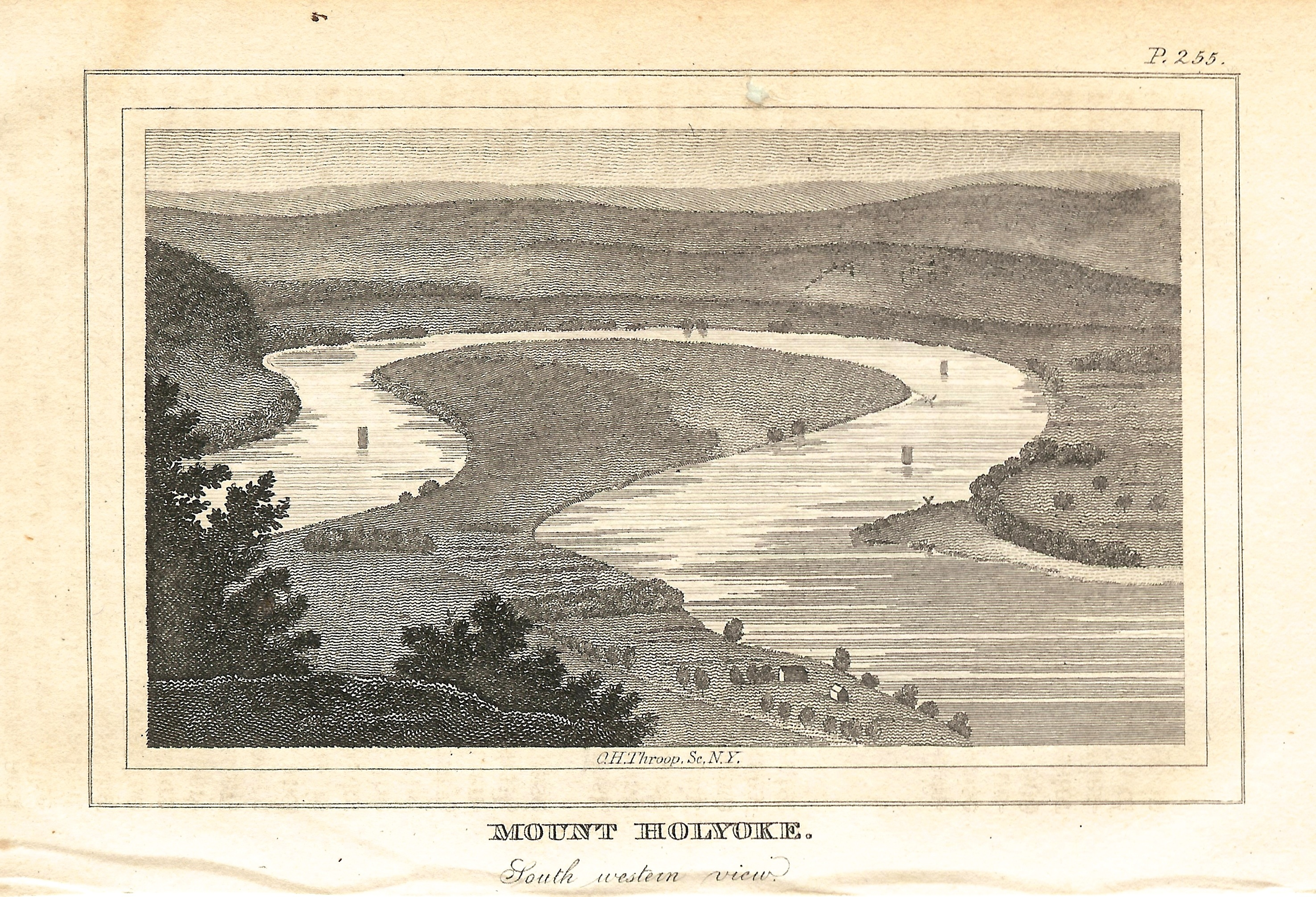
View from Mount Holyoke, 1826; referred in related text as "Hockanum Bend"

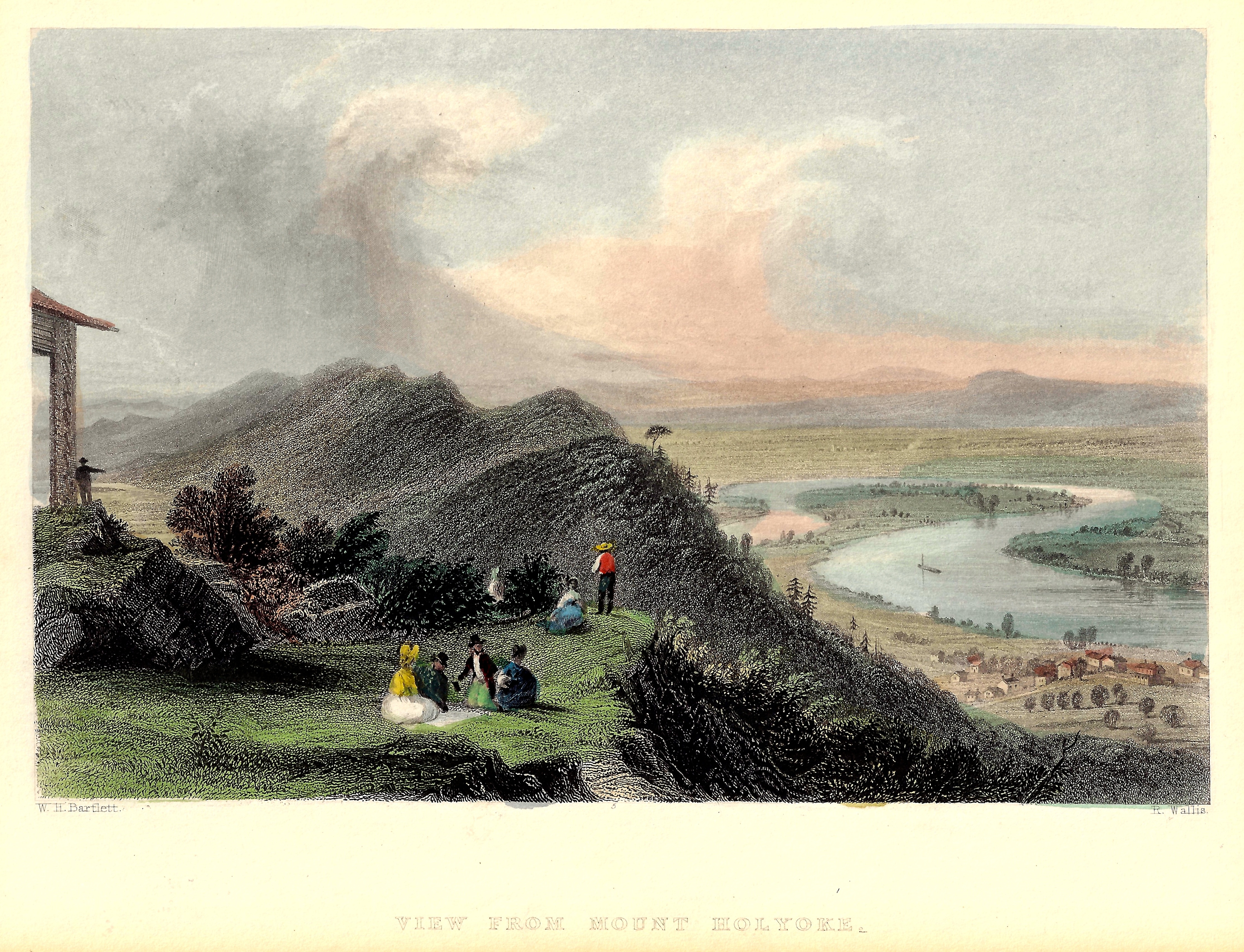
View from Mount Holyoke, illustration by William Henry Bartlett, 1835

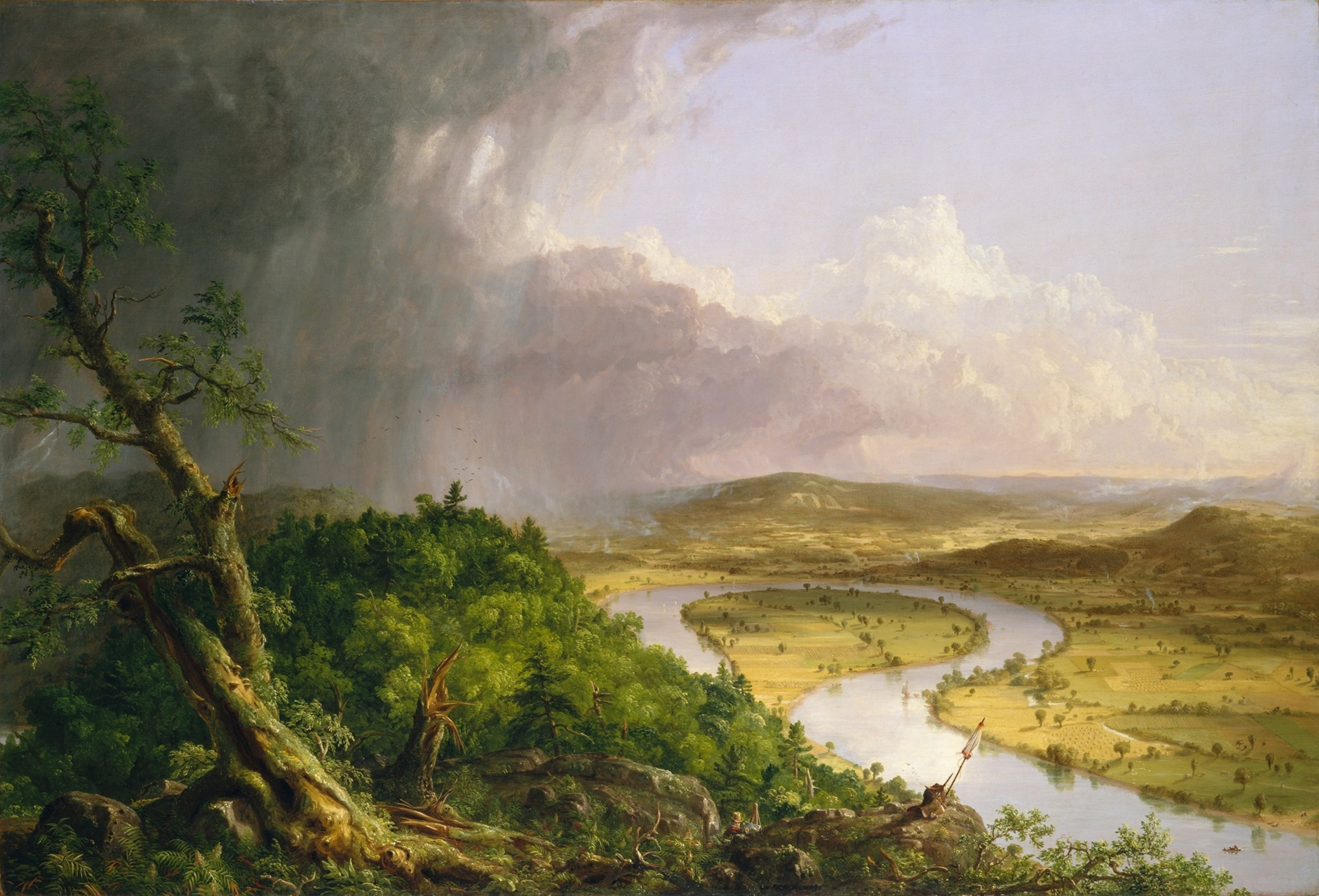
"View from Mount Holyoke, Northampton, Massachusetts, after a Thunderstorm", commonly known as "The Oxbow", by Thomas Cole, 1836

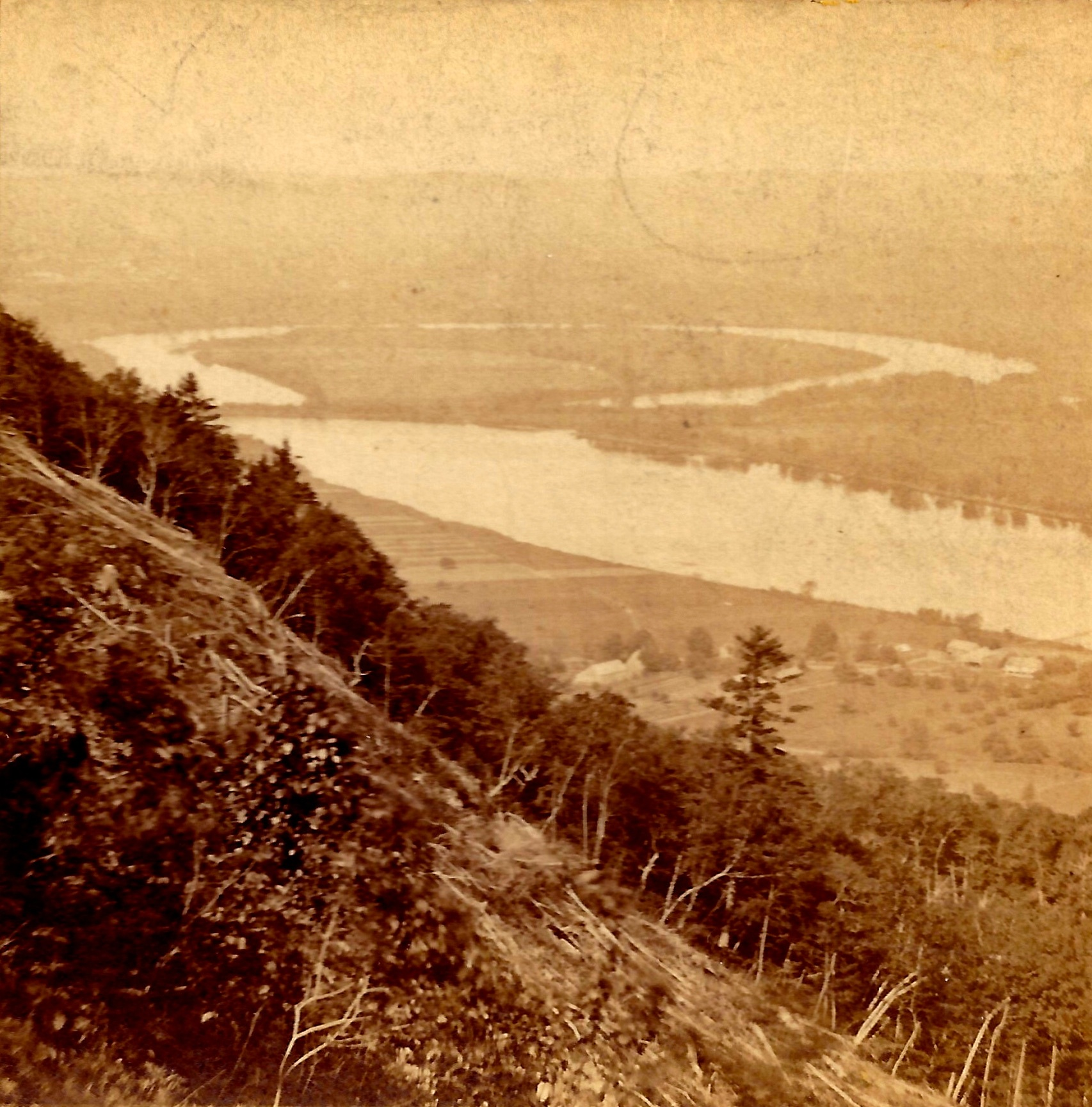
Connecticut River, Oxbow, Northampton, MA; stereoview c. 1870

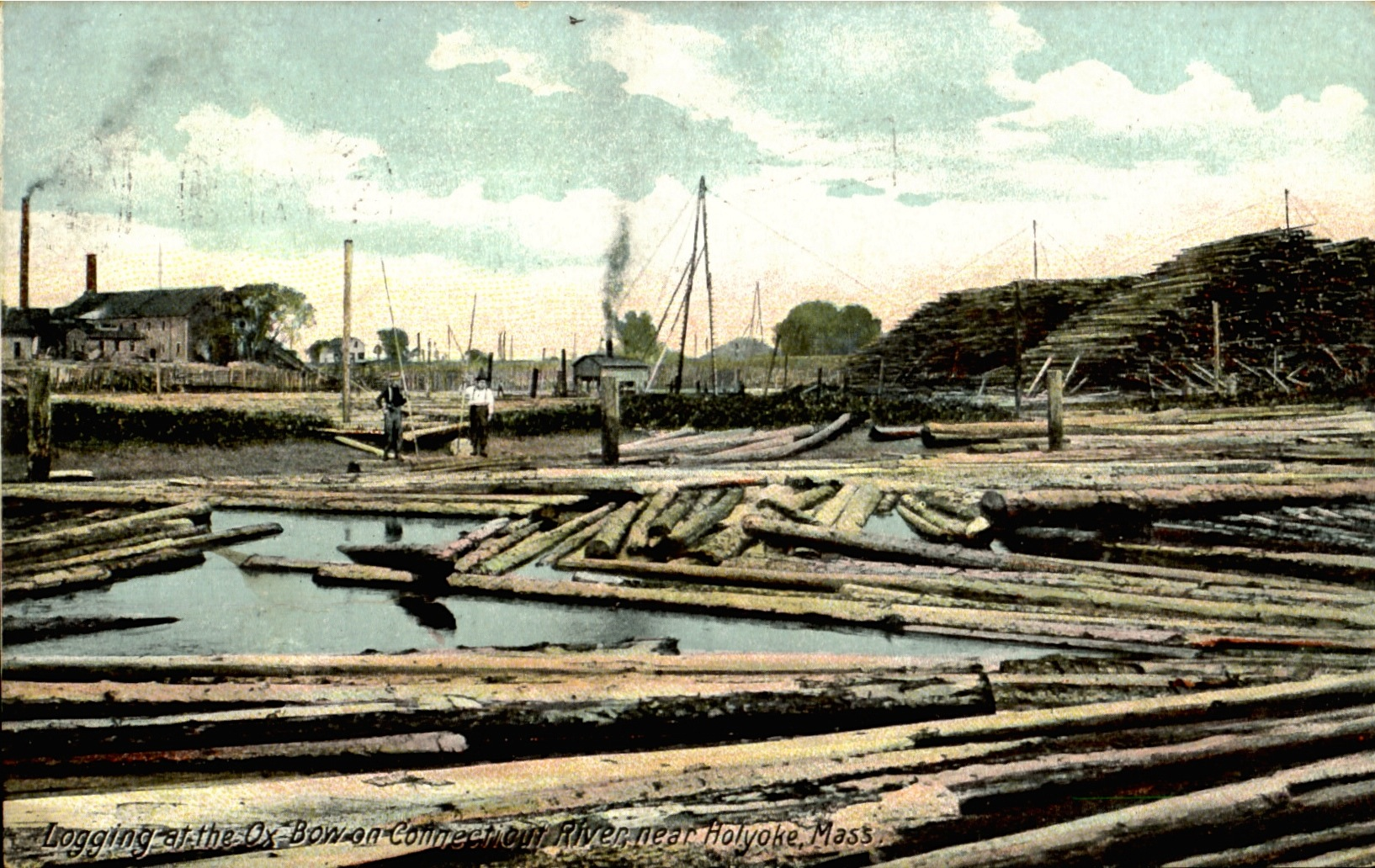
Logging at the Oxbow, c. 1909

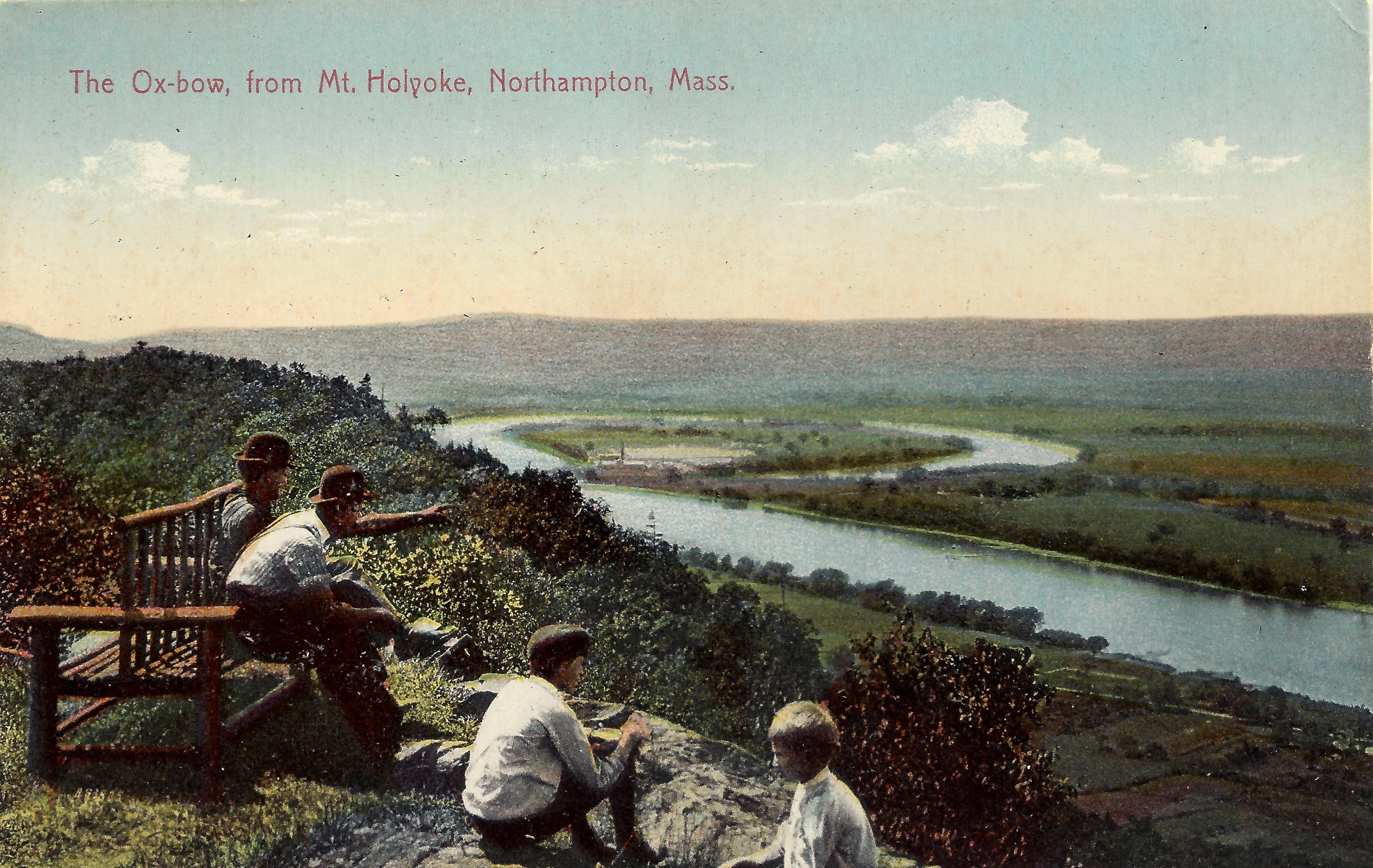
Connecticut River, Oxbow, Northampton, MA; postcard posted 1911

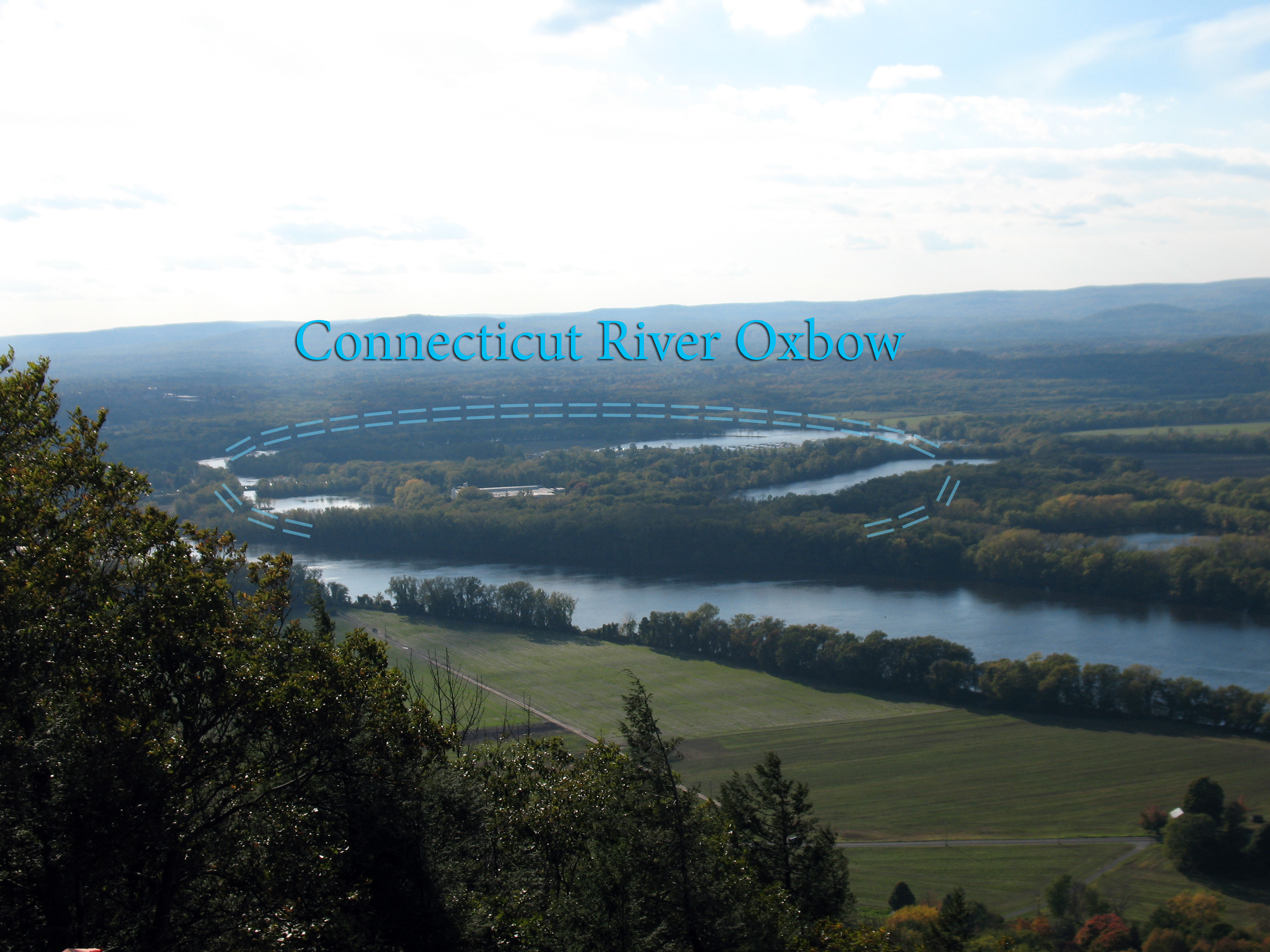
Connecticut River Oxbow, photo taken from Skinner State Park on Mount Holyoke

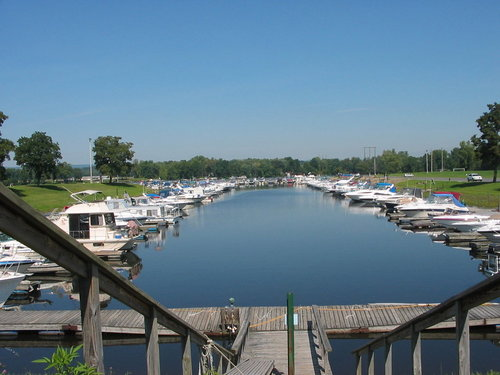
Contemporary view from the Oxbow marina
