= Easthampton, Massachusetts =

City in Massachusetts, United States

- City
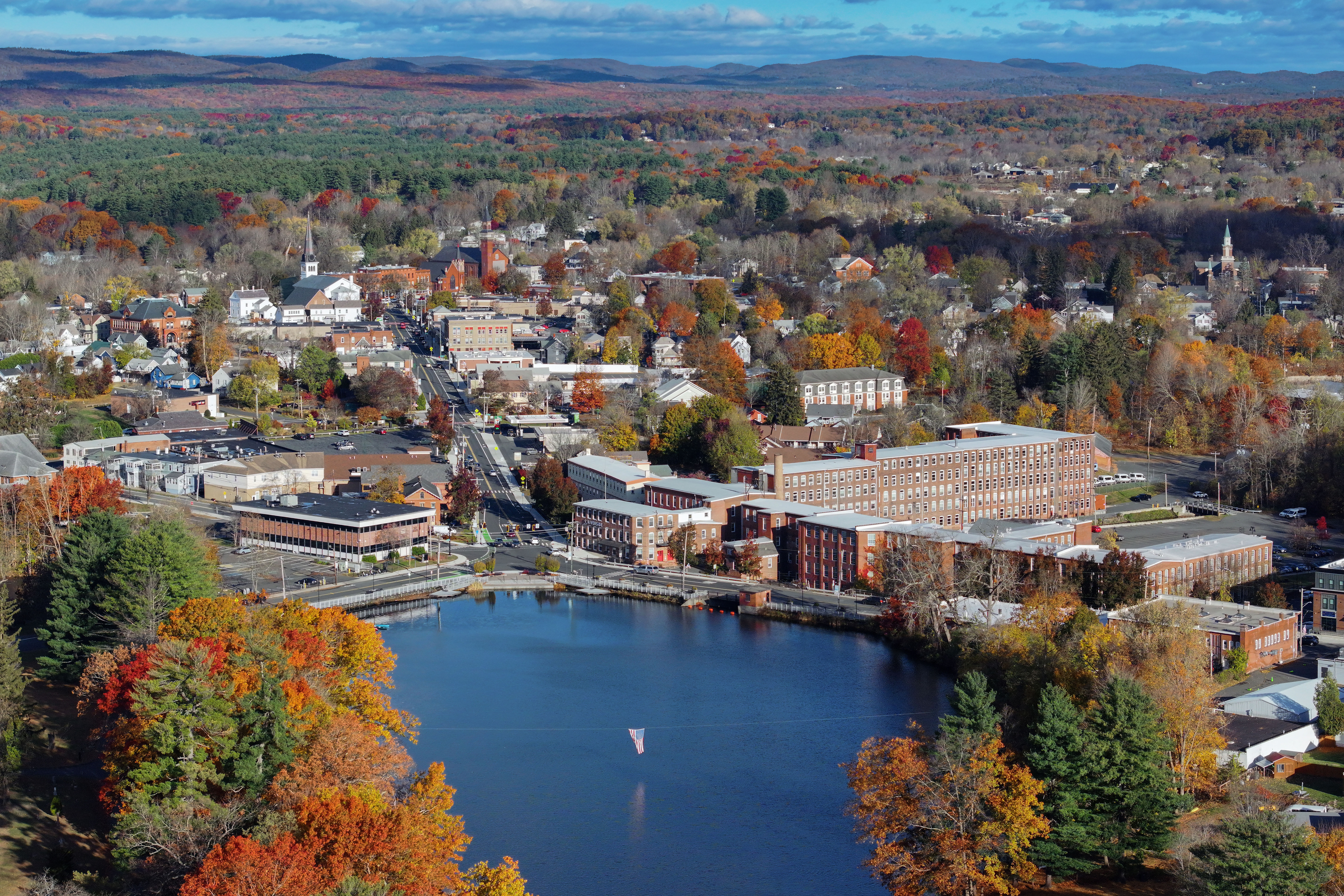
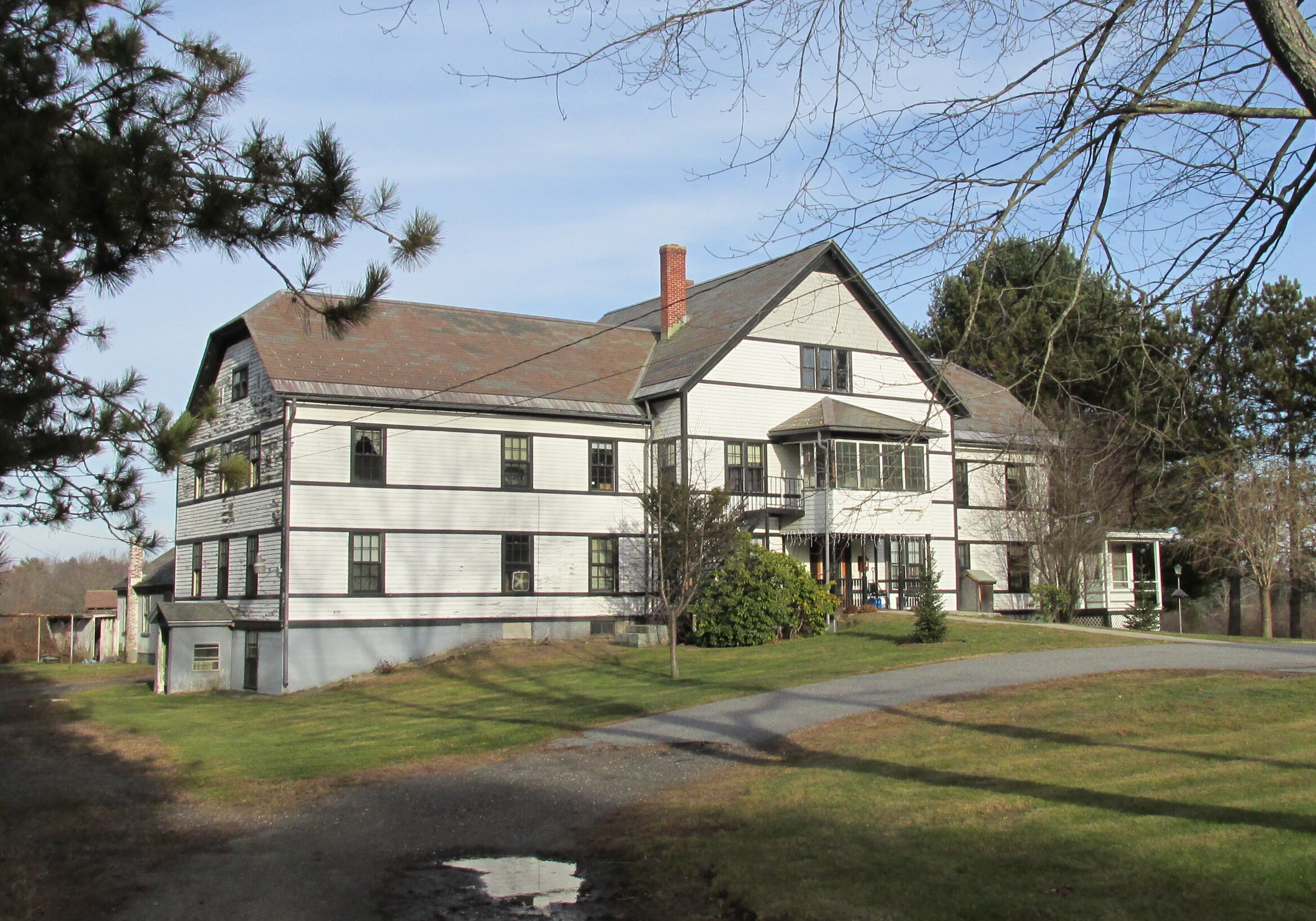
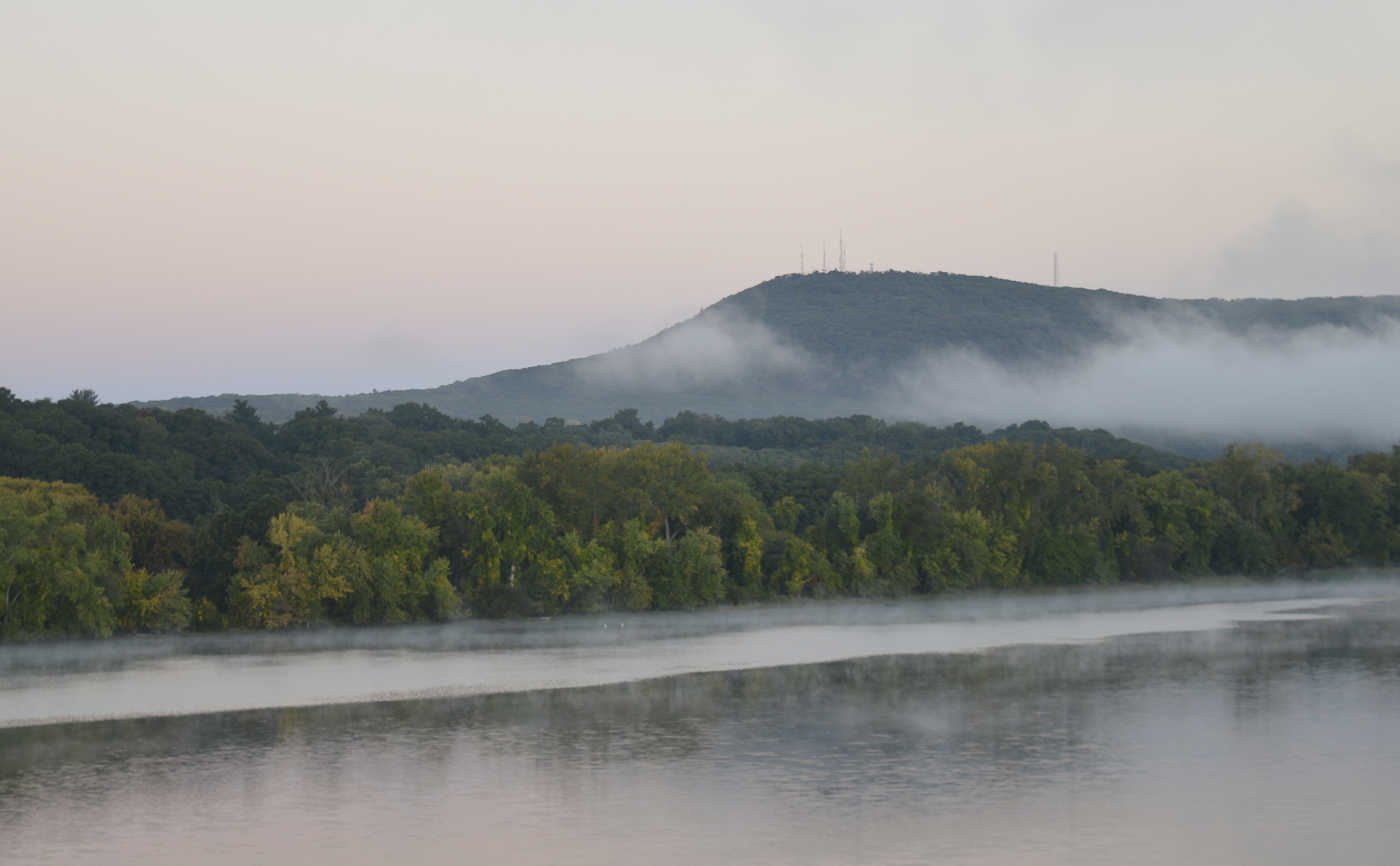
- Downtown The Town Farm Mount Tom

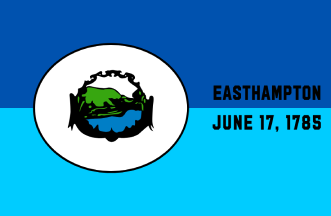
- Flag Seal
- Motto: Artes et Literæ cum Virtute Conjunctæ (Latin "Arts and Letters joined together with Virtue")
- Location in Hampshire County in Massachusetts

- Location in the United States
- Coordinates: 42°16′00″N 72°40′10″W
- Country: United States
- State: Massachusetts
- County: Hampshire
- Settled: 1664
- Incorporated (district): June 17, 1785
- Incorporated (town): 1809
- Incorporated (city): 1996

Government
  - Type: Mayor-council city
  - Mayor: Salem Derby
  - City Council: Koni Denham; Nathan Markee; Jonathan Schmidt; Felicia Jadczak; James "JP" Kwiecinski; Tamara Smith; Thomas W. Peake; Kiam Jamrog-McQuaid; Amanda Newton

Area
  - Total: 13.60 sq mi (35.23 km^{2})
  - Land: 13.32 sq mi (34.50 km^{2})
  - Water: 0.28 sq mi (0.73 km^{2})
- Elevation: 171 ft (52 m)

Population (2020)
  - Total: 16,211
  - Density: 1,216.8/sq mi (469.82/km^{2})
- Time zone: UTC−5 (Eastern)
  - Summer (DST): UTC−4 (Eastern)
- ZIP Code: 01027
- Area code: 413
- FIPS code: 25-19370
- GNIS feature ID: 0608739
- Website: easthamptonma.gov

Easthampton is a city in Hampshire County, Massachusetts, United States. The city is in the Pioneer Valley, near the five colleges in the college towns of Northampton and Amherst. The population was 16,211 at the 2020 census.

== History ==
Easthampton was first settled by European immigrants beginning in 1664 as the village of Pascommuck and was originally part of Northampton. On 24 May 1704 during Queen Anne's War, a party of 72 Native Americans attacked the village, killing 19 of 38 residents. The village was soon resettled, and by 1785, Easthampton was established as a "district" by Massachusetts (a former type of political entity with less independence than a town), and in 1809, it was incorporated as a town. Easthampton is the youngest municipality in Hampshire County by date of incorporation. (It was not, however, the last incorporated; two of the three disincorporated towns of the Quabbin Reservoir in Hampshire County, Enfield and Prescott, were incorporated afterwards.)

The town grew primarily around the Manhan River, both through its phase as a strictly agricultural community and later, through the Industrial Revolution, when mills and factories were first built in Easthampton, mainly in connection with textile manufacturing and its offshoots. The first of these, the Williston-Knight Button Company, was established in 1847 by Samuel Williston, son of the town's first minister, a Congregationalist named Payson Williston. The company specialized in cloth-covered buttons—a coveted item at the time—and to facilitate the operation of the machinery, a local brook was dammed, creating Nashawannuck Pond. Other mills soon opened nearby, a number of them specializing in elastic and rubber thread manufacturing.

Following this spurt of industrial development, the town's first high school and first national bank opened in 1864, and a town hall was built in 1869. Constables were replaced by the town's first police officer in 1871, the same year that Easthampton became a regular stop on the railroad. The town's public library opened in 1881, and fourteen years later in 1895 the community was introduced to two new innovations, telephones and streetcars. With the influx of new residents came a number of new churches, founded for Catholic, Episcopalian, Lutheran, and Methodist parishioners, as well as a second Congregational church. In 1899, the West Boylston Manufacturing Company and the Hampton Company, both specializing in cloth production, moved to Easthampton, recruiting a larger immigrant labor force, particularly from Poland and Canada.

During World War I, the town's mills all obtained federal wartime contracts and did well financially, but long before the Great Depression hit, many factories owners were already laying off employees, seeking mergers with other companies, or looking for buyers for their facilities. One of the few successes during this time was the American Character Doll Company, also known as Paragon Rubber, whose cofounder, Edward Schaeffer, was credited with inventing the first rubber doll mass-marketed in the United States.

World War II provided some relief for the Easthampton economy, as several of the older textile companies as well as newer heavy manufacturing corporations received another round of federal contracts. However, beginning in the early 1960s a number of critical closures hit the town hard. Revitalization attempts began with the opening of a new industrial park and continued with a joint government-private industrial mall which has failed to solve significantly higher rates of unemployment and poverty compared to Hampshire County as a whole.

Small farms and well-established small businesses remain the economic core of Easthampton. Easthampton changed its charter in 1996 to become a city. Since 1996 the downtown area has attracted a small community of artists and young people migrating due to Easthampton's lower cost of living compared to nearby Northampton, a hub of the bohemian community regionally. Small stores around Main Street, Union Street, and Cottage Street have changed business due to the influx of this new demographic. This growth has produced new arts and cultural events such as the monthly Art Walk Easthampton in which visual, music and performance artists showcase their talents at venues around the city. In November 2018, the administration of Massachusetts Governor Charlie Baker announced a $3.5 million grant through the MassWorks program to the Ferry Street Mill redevelopment project in the city.

== Geography ==
Easthampton is just south of the geographic center of Hampshire County. It is bordered by Southampton and Westhampton to its west, by Holyoke in Hampden County to its east and south, and by Northampton to its north. It also has a river boundary with Hadley to its northeast across the Connecticut River. The western flanks of Mount Tom and Mount Nonotuck form its eastern boundary.

Massachusetts Route 10 passes through the center of Easthampton as Main Street and Northampton Street, leading northeast 5 miles (8 km) to the center of Northampton and southwest 4 miles (6 km) to Southampton. Massachusetts Route 141 (Union Street, Cottage Street, and Holyoke Street) leads southeast from the center of Easthampton 6 miles (10 km) past Mount Tom to Holyoke. Interstate 91 and U.S. Route 5 cross the northeastern tip of Easthampton near the Connecticut River, leading north to Northampton and south to Holyoke.

According to the U.S. Census Bureau, the city of Easthampton has a total area of 13.6 square miles (35.2 km^{2}), of which 13.3 square miles (34.5 km^{2}) are land and 0.3 square miles (0.7 km^{2}), or 2.02%, are water. The Manhan River crosses Easthampton north of the city center, flowing into The Oxbow, a former channel of the Connecticut River, at the northeastern end of the city.

== Education ==
In 1797, the town was divided into four school districts. By the middle of the 19th century, the town offered over twelve small schools. Over the following century, the town began to reduce the number of small schools and to build schools suited for higher volume. In 1897, an eight-room school was constructed on Maple Street. The Maple Street School was later enlarged to 16 rooms. The junior high school was consolidated here from 1950 to 1962. After 1962, this school was used for elementary classes.

Mount Holyoke College graduate Sarah Chapin, the last principal of girls at Williston Seminary, became the town's first high school principal in 1864. Chapin designed the initial curriculum, and served as principal until ill health in 1891. She retired with the class of 1901 and died that summer. In 1864, Williston Seminary decided to stop offering classes for girls. The town constructed a two-story school for use as the town's first high school. In 1912, the school district constructed a new high school and enlarged this building (then called Park Primary School) using brick salvaged from the Center Union School. It was used as an elementary school until 1939 and again from the 1950s to the 1970s. This building, now called the Memorial Building, is currently being used as municipal offices.

In 1902, the town responded to the population increase resulting from the growth of the West Boylston and Hampton Companies. The Center Street School, an eight-room school, replaced the Center Union School. In 1920, the interior of this building was reconfigured as a 12-room school. It has served as a middle school, high school, and grade school. Replacing the Lovefield Street School in 1902, the Parsons Street School was built to serve children in the New City section of town.

In 1912, a new high school was built. An eight-room school was expanded in 1934, adding a gymnasium and an auditorium. After a new high school was built in 1962, this building was used for a junior high school and middle school. In 1975, it was converted for use as a grade school and renamed the Neil A. Pepin School.

As of March 2023, the city's public school district includes a single PK-8 school, Mountain View School, built in 2022 and consolidates the former schools of Pepin, Center, and White Brook Middle School. And a high school (Easthampton High School), which was built in 2013. In addition, Hilltown Cooperative Charter Public School (K–8), and the Williston Northampton School (7–12), a private preparatory school are based out of Easthampton.

== Demographics ==
Historical population
Year	Pop.	±%
1790	457	—
1850	1,342	+193.7%
1860	1,916	+42.8%
1870	3,620	+88.9%
1880	4,206	+16.2%
1890	4,395	+4.5%
1900	5,603	+27.5%
1910	8,524	+52.1%
1920	11,261	+32.1%
1930	11,323	+0.6%
1940	10,316	−8.9%
1950	10,694	+3.7%
1960	12,326	+15.3%
1970	13,012	+5.6%
1980	15,580	+19.7%
1990	15,537	−0.3%
2000	15,994	+2.9%
2010	16,053	+0.4%
2020	16,211	+1.0%
2024*	16,020	−1.2%
* = population estimate. Source: United States Census records and Population Estimates Program data. Source: U.S. Decennial Census

As of the census of 2010, there were 16,053 people, 7,224 households, and 4,066 families residing in the city. The population density was 1,192.1 inhabitants per square mile (460.3/km^{2}). There were 7,615 housing units at an average density of 527.9 per square mile (203.8/km^{2}). The racial makeup of the city was 93.6% White, 3.7% Hispanic, 1.1% African American, 0.2% Native American, 2.4% Asian, <0.1% Pacific Islander, 1.1% from other races, and 1.6% from two or more races.

There were 7,224 households, out of which 21.6% had children under the age of 18 living with them, 42.2% were married couples living together, 10.4% had a female householder with no husband present, and 43.7% were non-families. 33.9% of all households were made up of individuals, and 25.1% had someone living alone who was 65 years of age or older. The average household size was 2.21 and the average family size was 2.85.

In the city, the population was spread out, with 18.0% under the age of 18, 7.5% from 18 to 24, 32.4% from 25 to 44, 24.8% from 45 to 64, and 14.1% who were 65 years of age or older. The median age was 43 years. For every 100 women and girls, there were 92.5 men and boys. For every 100 women age 18 and over, there were 89.7 men.

The median income for a household in the city was $45,185, and the median income for a family was $54,312. Men had a median income of $36,446 versus $28,756 for women. The per capita income for the city was $21,922. About 5.9% of families and 8.9% of the population were below the poverty line, including 15.0% of those under age 18 and 9.9% of those age 65 or over.

== Government ==
Easthampton was first established in 1785 by as a town, with a board of selectmen acting as the executive. It had a town meeting form of legislature. Local voters enacted their newest charter in July 1996, establishing a city form of governance while retaining the name "Town" in its official name. Michael Tautznik was elected the first mayor of Easthampton in September 1996, after a charter was passed making the mayor the chief executive officer. The town council replaced town meeting as the legislative branch and consists of four at-large members and five district councilors. In 1999 the mayor and council petitioned the General Court to remove the word "town" from its name and to replace the word town with "city". Mayor Tautznik was elected to an eighth term in November 2010. In November 2013, Karen Cadieux was elected mayor after Mayor Tautznik did not seek reelection. In 2017, lawyer Nicole LaChapelle defeated long-time district councilor Joy Winnie to become the city's next mayor. In 2025, LaChapelle stepped down as Mayor and City Council President Salem Derby became acting mayor.

In 2019, the city voted by referendum to adopt single-winner ranked-choice voting to elect the mayor as well as city council members from single-winner districts, while retaining plurality first-past-the-post elections for the four at-large council seats. The reform took effect for the 2021 city elections. In 2023, the city voted by referendum to adopt proportional multi-winner ranked-choice voting for the four at-large districts.

At the state level, Easthampton is in the Hampshire & Hampden district of the Massachusetts Senate, represented by John Velis (D-Westfield), and the 2nd Hampshire district of the Massachusetts House of Representatives, represented by Homar Gomez (D-Easthampton). Easthampton is located in the Eighth Massachusetts Governor's Council district and is represented by Tara Jacobs (D-North Adams).

Voter Registration and Party Enrollment as of October 15, 2008
Party	Number of Voters	Percentage
Democratic	4,117	35.49%
Republican	1,027	8.85%
Unaffiliated	6,327	54.54%
Libertarian	130	1.12%
Total	11,601	100%

== Notable people ==
- Lloyd Cole, musician
- Amy Gardiner, animator
- Andrew Hussie, webcomic artist
- Jeph Jacques, webcomic artist
- Kelly Link, author
- John D. Ludden, businessman and politician
- Thomas Lux, poet, nonfiction writer, teacher
- Lauren D. Lyman, journalist
- Jeff Mason, professional ice hockey defenseman and coach, Belfast Giants
- Jeremy Powers, cyclist (2012, 2014, 2015, & 2016 US Cyclocross national champion)
- Jeffrey Rowland, webcomic artist

== Points of interest ==
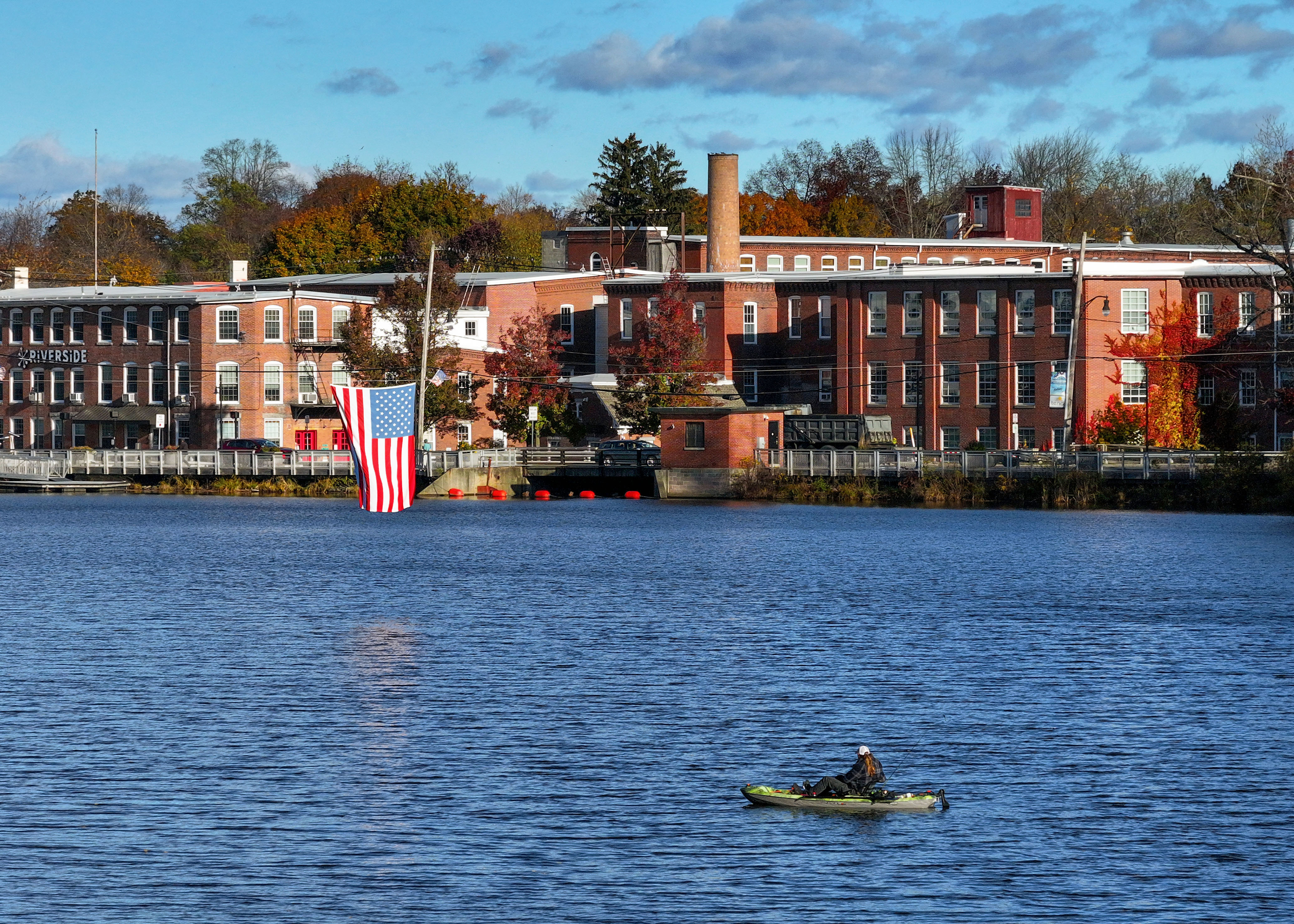
Nashawannuck Mills

Easthampton has a number of points of interest.

The Mount Tom State Reservation extends into the eastern part the city, and many local residents hike up to enjoy the view of the Pioneer Valley from the rock ledges. Mount Tom, with a summit elevation of 1,202 feet (366 m), is the highest traprock peak on the Metacomet Ridge, a linear mountain range that extends from Long Island Sound to the Vermont border. Mount Tom is characterized by its high cliffs, sweeping vistas, and microclimate ecosystems. The 110-mile (180 km) Metacomet-Monadnock Trail traverses the mountain.

The Arcadia Wildlife Sanctuary, part of the Massachusetts Audubon Society, is split between Easthampton and neighboring Northampton. Recently, the Manhan Rail Trail bicycle path was built over an old railroad line, and there are plans to connect the path to others in the area. Near the rail trail and wildlife sanctuary are three conservation areas owned by the local non-profit land trust, Pascommuck Conservation Trust, part of the trust's 200 acres (0.81 km^{2}) of holdings in Easthampton.

The Old Town Hall is a historic building located in the Main Street Historic District in Easthampton, Massachusetts. The High Victorian Gothic town hall was built in 1869 by Boston architect Charles Edward Parker. In 1987, it was listed on the National Register of Historic Places. Old Town Hall is managed by the nonprofit CitySpace, Inc. as a center for the arts.

In and around downtown Easthampton, attractions include:

- The Cottage Street Cultural District, named by the Massachusetts Cultural Council and the Commonwealth of Massachusetts in 2013.
- The Easthampton Public Library, formerly the Emily Williston Memorial Library, listed on the National Register of Historic Places in 1987, provides a collection of over 45,000 books, movies, and other media for Easthampton and the surrounding towns. Designed by Peabody & Stearns.
- The Williston Northampton School, a private secondary prep school
- One Cottage Street, an old factory building, renovated in the late 1970s to make workshops and studios for artists and craftspeople
- Riverside Industries, also at One Cottage Street, a human service organization offering a variety of innovative programs for people with disabilities
- Eastworks, the old Stanley Home Products factory building, recently converted into artists' studios, offices, and restaurant space
- The historic old fire station, recently made into a workshop by local furniture maker Silas Kopf

== Events ==
Easthampton has many events throughout the year. Every February the Friends of the Nashawannuck Pond host WinterFest to raise funds for Nashawannuck Pond and develop public awareness about ongoing efforts to keep the pond healthy.

Thunder in the Valley is a summer music concert featuring fireworks. All proceeds are donated to the Children's Miracle Network.

Every summer, MillPond.Live brings a festival series designed to unite people from all walks of life to Easthampton's Millside Park, with local and international music, food, art, and community. This festival sees thousands of attendees.

Easthampton City Arts (ECA) is a city organization that creates positive, innovative and accessible arts programming and cultural events. Some of the events that ECA organizes include: Art Walk (a free and family-friendly event held throughout the city every second Thursday of the month); Cultural Chaos (a street festival that celebrates the Cottage Street Cultural District); and Porchfest (Easthampton's very first Porchfest was held in September 2023 and will return in 2024).

Easthampton also features several Open Studios throughout the year, hosted by various artists and studios located in some of the city's many converted mill buildings. Cottage Street Open Studios will take place in May, and Eastworks Open Studios will take place in November.
