= Elm Street Historic District (Hatfield, Massachusetts) =

Historic district in Massachusetts, United States

- U.S. National Register of Historic Places
- U.S. Historic district
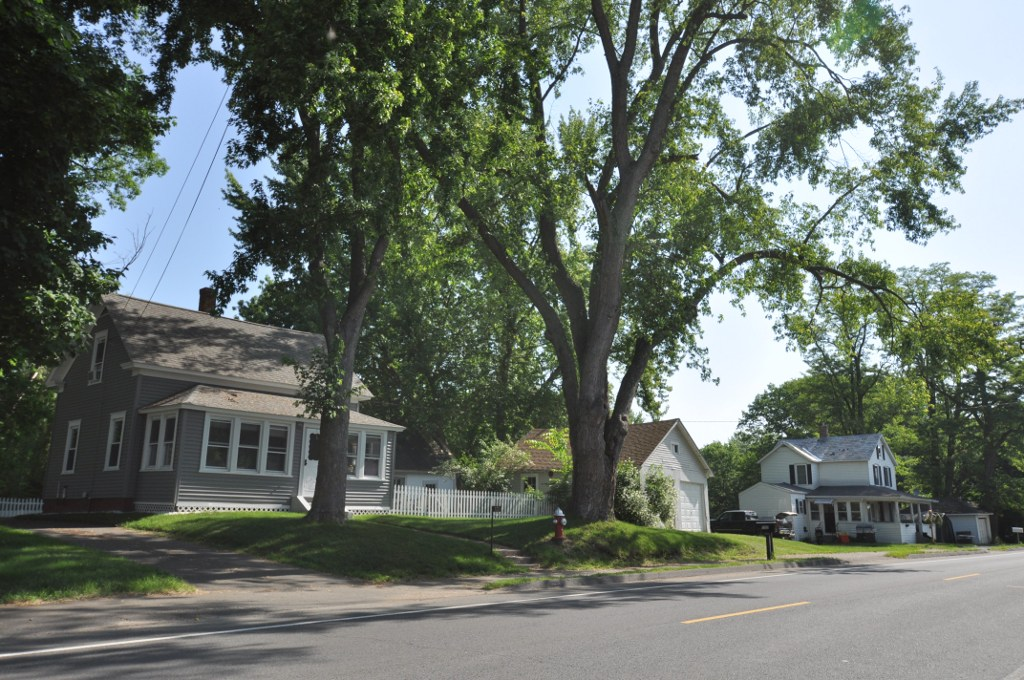
- Bungalow-style houses on Elm Street

- Location within Massachusetts Location within the United States
- Location: Elm Street, southern Hatfield, Massachusetts
- Coordinates: 42°21′35″N 72°37′0″W
- Area: 561 acres (227 ha)
- Architectural style: Georgian, Federal
- NRHP reference No.: 00001481
- Added to NRHP: December 7, 2000

The Elm Street Historic District is a rural historic district in southern Hatfield, Massachusetts. It encompasses a landscape that has seen agricultural use since 17th century colonial days, including fields now used for tobacco farming, and historic properties located along five roads: Elm Street, Scotland Road, Sunset Road, Brook Hollow Road, and Little Neponset Road. The district is bounded on its south by the Connecticut River, on its east and north by the Mill River, with a small portion of land border in the northeast which cuts off a large meander in the river. This section, near the junction of Elm and Prospect Streets, is also where this district abuts the Mill-Prospect Street Historic District, which runs north along Prospect Street, and its eastern boundary abuts the Hatfield Center Historic District. Its western boundary is roughly a north-south line in the area of the junction of Elm and Dwight Streets.

Most of the buildings in the district are either residential or agricultural in nature, and the district includes the agricultural fields lying south of Elm Street, as well as important agricultural buildings such as tobacco drying barns. The houses in the district stylistically represent the long history of the period, and most home construction in the area had ended by the 1940s. The district was listed on the National Register of Historic Places in 2000.

Hatfield was settled in the mid-17th century, and was incorporated as a town in 1670. The Elm Street area was originally common agricultural land, with land along Elm Street formally platted for residential development in 1683. Growth was generally slow, with a significant uptick in new construction after American independence in the late 19th century. Unlike the more prosperous town center, the Elm Street area saw the construction of utilitarian agricultural worker housing. It also saw the growth of some small cottage industries, such as broom-making which were also found in other parts of the town. Tobacco was a major and highly successful crop in the area, resulting in the construction of many tobacco barns. A trolley line built in 1900 on Elm Street to Northampton spurred additional development in the early 20th century.

== See also ==
- West Hatfield Historic District
- Upper Main Street Historic District (Hatfield, Massachusetts)
- North Hatfield Historic District
- Bradstreet Historic District
- National Register of Historic Places listings in Hampshire County, Massachusetts
