= Upper Main Street Historic District (Hatfield, Massachusetts) =

Historic district in Massachusetts, United States

- U.S. National Register of Historic Places
- U.S. Historic district
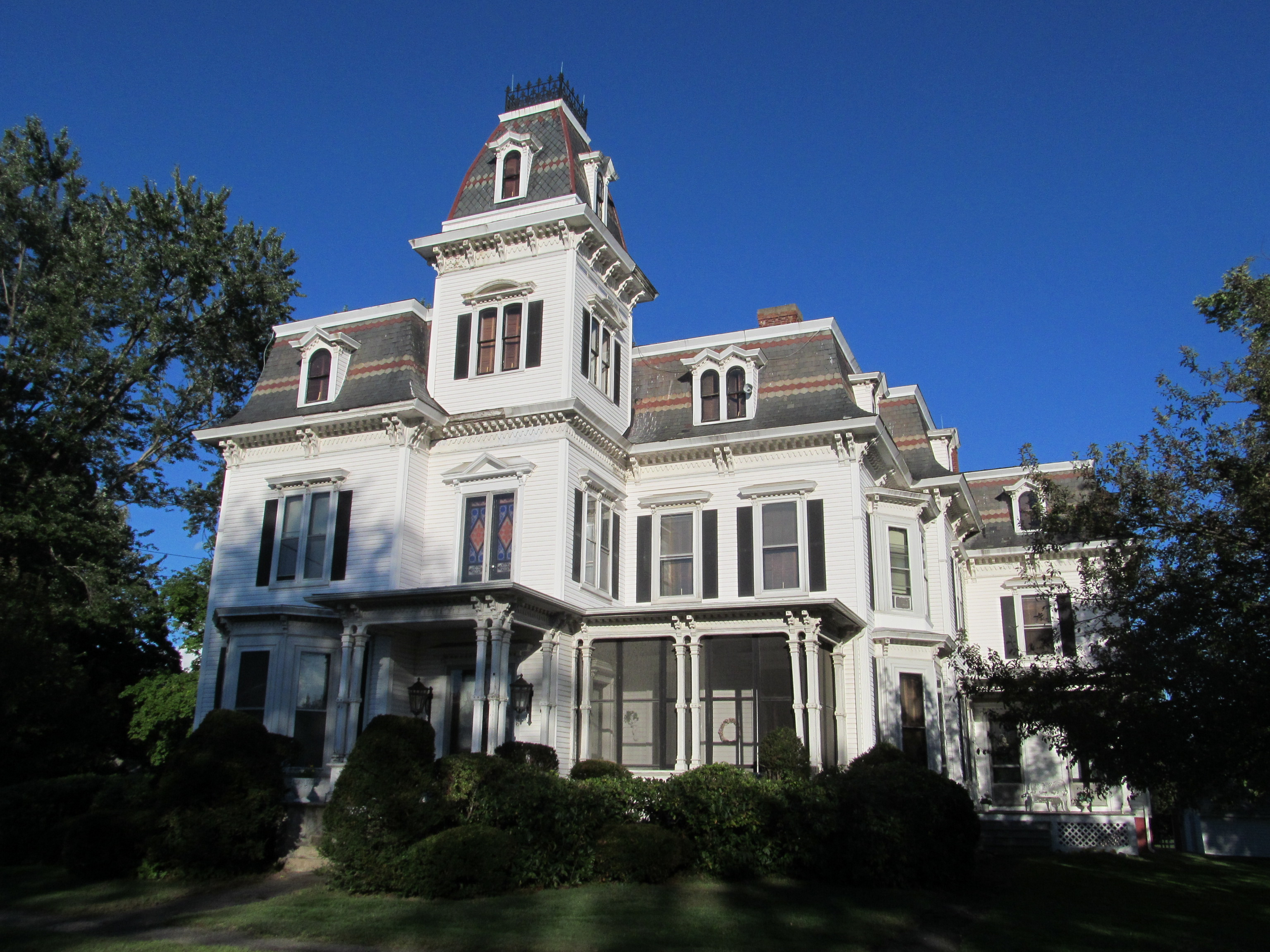
- A house on upper Main Street

- Location within Massachusetts Location within the United States
- Location: Main St. from 83 Main to Cow Bridge, 1-44 King St. and 6-70 North St. Hatfield, Massachusetts
- Coordinates: 42°23′15″N 72°35′52″W
- Area: 532 acres (215 ha)
- Architect: Marsh, Hiram; Dickinson, Caleb Cooley
- Architectural style: Colonial, Mid 19th Century Revival, Late 19th And 20th Century Revivals
- NRHP reference No.: 94000735
- Added to NRHP: July 22, 1994

The Upper Main Street Historic District is a predominantly residential historic district in northeastern Hatfield, Massachusetts. Unlike Hatfield Center, which dated to colonial days and lies south of the district, this part of Hatfield developed roughly between 1860 and 1939 as a village centered on the nearby ferry landing on the Connecticut River. The district includes properties in a roughly triangular area bounded by Main Street, King Street, and North Street, and features a large number of Colonial Revival, Queen Anne, and bungalow-style houses. The district was listed on the National Register of Historic Places in 1994.

The town center of Hatfield was laid out in 1661, with narrow house lots facing the main road, and large agricultural areas surrounding the village. The southern portion of this district includes a portion of the original town plan, which is still evident in the placement of houses and surrounding land use. In addition to the residential buildings lining its roads, the district also includes agricultural buildings related to the area's historic patterns of agriculture. Prominent among these are several tobacco barns, reflecting the importance of that crop in the town's 19th century economic prosperity. There are also several surviving livestock and horse barns, of which one of the former dates to about 1800. The oldest house in the district, the Jeremiah Bardwell House at 108 Main Street, is of similar vintage, dating to about 1790.

== See also ==
- Bradstreet Historic District
- North Hatfield Historic District
- West Hatfield Historic District
- National Register of Historic Places listings in Hampshire County, Massachusetts
