= Hatfield Center Historic District =

Historic district in Massachusetts, United States

- U.S. National Register of Historic Places
- U.S. Historic district
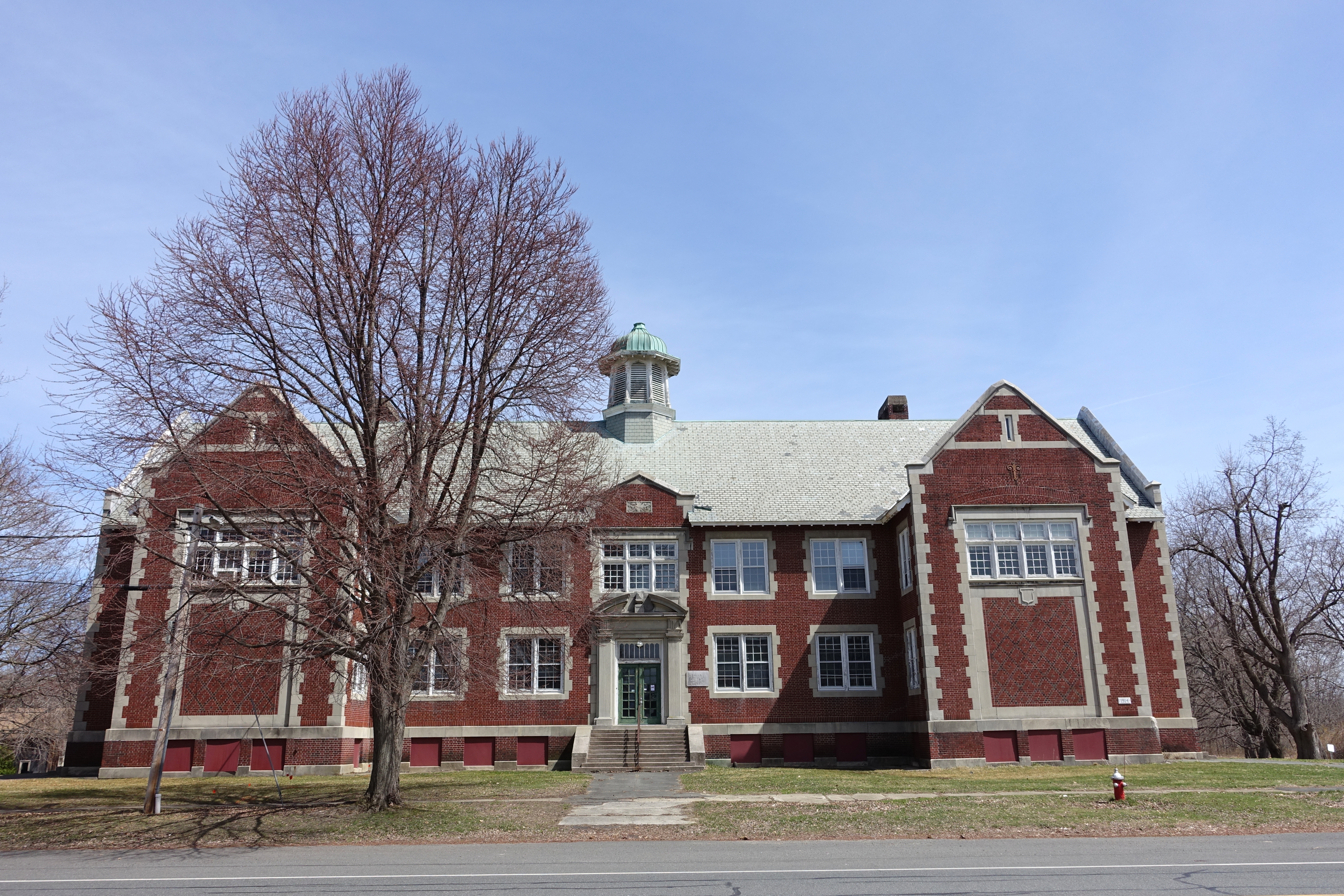
- Center School

- Location within Massachusetts Location within the United States
- Location: Roughly bounded by the Connecticut and Mill Rivers and Day Ave., Hatfield, Massachusetts
- Coordinates: 42°21′43″N 72°36′1″W
- Area: 465 acres (188 ha)
- Built: 1677
- Architectural style: Late 19th And 20th Century Revivals, Mid 19th Century Revival, Colonial
- NRHP reference No.: 94000737
- Added to NRHP: July 27, 1994

The Hatfield Center Historic District encompasses the traditional center of Hatfield, Massachusetts. The area, first laid out in 1661, is bounded by Maple Street to the south, the Connecticut River to the east, Day Avenue and School Street to the north, and the Mill River to the west. The area's layout and land use patterns are relatively little altered since they were laid out, leaving a well-preserved early colonial village landscape. The district was added to the National Register of Historic Places in 1994.

== Description and history ==
Hatfield's town center is basically linear, running north-south on Main Street, which is separated from the Connecticut River by agricultural fields. The district abuts the Elm Street and the Mill-Prospect Street Historic Districts to the west. Main Street is characterized by well-spaced residential lots containing homes built in the 18th and 19th centuries, and the civic heart of the town, where the town hall, Center School, and Memorial Hall are located. The lot arrangement, with houses built close to the street, was in part a deliberately defensive plan, which was in the colonial period surrounded by a fortified palisade against attacks from Native Americans. Although most of the buildings are now of later construction, the plan is still evident.

The oldest buildings in the district were built about 1740. These two houses, at 30 School Street and 72 Main Street, are typical Georgian 2-1/2 story wood frame structures with gabled roofs and five-bay facades. Most of the houses in the district were built before 1830, and are either Georgian or Federal in their style. As the village grew in the 19th century, houses in other styles were either filled in or extended to the edges of the village. Most of the villages civic and religious buildings were built after 1870; the notable exception is the Congregational church, which is Greek Revival and style and was built in 1849.

== See also ==
- National Register of Historic Places listings in Hampshire County, Massachusetts
- Bradstreet Historic District
- North Hatfield Historic District
- West Hatfield Historic District
- Upper Main Street Historic District (Hatfield, Massachusetts)
