= Robert J. Ryan Sr. =

American ambassador

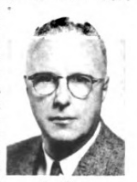

2nd US Ambassador to Niger
- In office July 9, 1964 – August 19, 1968
- President: Lyndon B. Johnson
- Preceded by: Mercer Cook
- Succeeded by: Samuel C. Adams, Jr.

Personal details
- Born: July 11, 1914 Hatfield, Massachusetts
- Died: September 13, 2003 (aged 89) Daytona Beach, Florida

Robert Joseph Ryan Sr. (July 11, 1914 – September 17, 2003) was an American diplomat. Ryan served as the US Ambassador to Niger from 1964 to 1968.

== Early life and family ==
Robert Joseph Ryan was born in Hatfield, Massachusetts to Thomas W. Ryan and Hannah Whalen. He graduated from Smith Academy. He studied for two years at the University of Massachusetts, followed by training at a business school in Washington, D.C., from which he graduated after taking a civil service examination. After graduating, Ryan worked as a sports reporter for two local newspapers.

He was married to the former Mary Frances O'Leary in 1938. They had two sons together: Robert Joseph Ryan, Jr. and Thomas Ryan. Both sons worked for the State Department and Robert Joseph Ryan, Jr. was the US Ambassador to Mali from 1984-1987.

== Career ==
Ryan joined the Department of State in 1937. Soon after, he completed a law degree at the Columbus School of Law in the Catholic University of America in D.C. Ryan worked in the passport office headed by Ruth Shipley until he was transferred to the personnel office, where he assumed managerial duties. He was promoted to Assistant Chief for Foreign Service Personnel. While Ryan was in this position, McCarthyism started to pick up its pace and Ryan was investigated for communist leanings by Senator Joseph McCarthy and his aides. He was interviewed by Roy Cohn, David Schine, and Julius Sourwine (an ex-FBI agent) in 1953. He was, at the time, the highest ranking person they had investigated. He was later summoned to a secret hearing on the charges against him. Ryan discovered over the course of the hearing that he was being investigated due to two disgruntled coworkers who had complained to McCarthy about Ryan's office not doing a good enough job at security and "maintaining separate files". McCarthy and his aides later transferred their attentions to the Department of the Army in lieu of the Department of State.

In 1955, Ryan joined the Foreign Service as a senior Foreign Service Officer. This same year, Ryan became the Executive Director of the Bureau of Near Eastern, South Asian, and African Affairs. He continued his management and administration role in this position. He also was charged with justifying the budget for the bureau and all of the posts in the countries under them. From 1958 to 1959, he attended the National War College. Ryan then served as a Counselor of Embassy at the United States Embassy in Paris from 1959 to 1964. He was present when John F. Kennedy and Jackie Kennedy visited Paris in 1961. As Counselor of Embassy, Ryan was responsible for administrative affairs and for the United States missions to NATO, the OECD and UNESCO.

Ryan was appointed as the second US Ambassador to Niger in July of 1964. He worked in this capacity until 1968. As Ambassador to Niger, Ryan developed plans to construct a new US embassy. He also helped with the construction of the Kennedy Bridge over the Niger River. The embassy wasn't complete until after Ryan had already left the position. Back in the United States, Ryan initially worked for almost a year as Deputy Assistant Secretary of State before leaving the Department. He then joined the United Nations, where he worked from 1969 to 1977 as Director of Administrative Affairs and later Assistant Secretary General. In this later position, Ryan headed a large-scale evaluation of internal processes.

== Retirement ==
Ryan retired in 1977. He continued his involvement in foreign affairs, staying involved in the local chapter of the United Nations Association. He also joined the boards of Bethune-Cookman College, Embry-Riddle Aeronautical University, and Diplomatic and Consular Officers Retired (DACOR).

On March 7, 2003, the American Foreign Service Association presented Ryan with its National Alumni Service Award only a few months before his death.

Ryan died in Daytona Beach at the age of 89.

In 2014, the Ambassador and Mrs. Robert J. Ryan International Relations Award was given out at Ryan's alma mater, Smith Academy.
