= Smith Vocational and Agricultural High School =

Location
- 80 Locust Street; Northampton, Massachusetts 01060-2094; United States; 42.3316°N 72.6559°W

Information
- School type: Public
- School district: Northampton-Smith Vocational Agricultural
- Local authority: 0406
- Principal: Joseph Bianca
- Grades: 9–12
- Enrollment: 434
- Student to teacher ratio: 9.5 to 1
- Classes offered: Career/Technical/Academic
- Hours in school day: 7:40 A.M. - 2:12 P.M.
- Colors: Black and Gold
- Mascot: Viking
- Accreditation: NEASC
- Website: smithtec.org

Smith Vocational and Agricultural High School is a four-year Career/Technical High School located in Northampton, Massachusetts, United States. Smith Vocational and Agricultural High School is a public high school for residents of Northampton and tuition students from all of Hampshire County. Students spend alternating weeks in shop and academic programs as they prepare for both a high school diploma and a Certificate of Occupational Proficiency. The school is accredited by the New England Association of Schools and Colleges, and all shop programs meet state standards for vocational education programs.

== History ==
Smith Vocational and Agricultural High School was established by a bequest from Oliver Smith. Smith was born in Hatfield, Massachusetts in 1766. He engaged in farming at an early age, and acquired large wealth by stock-raising. He was a magistrate for forty years; twice he was a representative to the legislature; and in 1820, he was a member of the State constitutional convention. His bequest for an Agricultural School became available for use in 1905, and the amount of $50,000 was turned over to the City of Northampton for the purchase of the land for Smith School, which opened for students in 1908 as the first vocational school in Massachusetts.

== Career-technical education ==
Smith Vocational offers students training in fifteen areas:

- Agriculture Mechanics
- Animal Science
- Auto Collision Repair
- Automotive Technology
- Cabinet Making
- Carpentry
- Cosmetology
- Culinary Arts
- Electrical
- Graphic Communications
- Health Technology
- Horticulture/Forestry
- Manufacturing Technologies
- Plumbing Technology
- Public Safety
