= Elector Under Will of Oliver Smith =

- fresco of the vault at the seat of the Electors
- Seat: Northampton, Massachusetts
- Term length: one to two years
- Constituting instrument: will of Oliver Smith and the charters and ordinances of nine towns in western Massachusetts
- Formation: 1859

Elector Under Will of Oliver Smith is a public, elected official in nine municipalities of the Commonwealth of Massachusetts who, together with other Electors Under Will of Oliver Smith, is charged with administering the disputed last will and testament of the miser Oliver Smith.

== Establishment ==
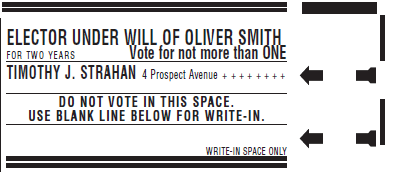
A portion of the 2015 election ballot of Greenfield, Massachusetts lists the sole candidate running for the office of that town's Elector Under Will of Oliver Smith

Oliver Smith was a wealthy miser resident in Hatfield, Massachusetts, who died on December 22, 1845. His will directed his estate be used for the good of the citizens of nine designated towns in Hampshire and Franklin counties, namely, Amherst, Deerfield, Easthampton, Greenfield, Hadley, Hatfield, Northampton, Whately, and Williamsburg, instead of being divided among his successors. The will of Oliver Smith was challenged by Smith's disinherited relatives.

Rufus Choate, representing the relatives, argued that a witness to Smith's will, Theophilus Phelps, was insane and the will, therefore, invalid. According to twelve different friends, physicians, and family members who offered testimony, Phelps had believed, since a student at Amherst College in 1843, that he was being pursued by an invisible force intent on capturing and dissecting him. Phelps himself was called to the stand by Daniel Webster, acting on behalf of the will's executors. During his testimony, Phelps showed extreme composure and claimed that, while he had previously had health issues, he had not suffered any "headaches" or "fears" for the preceding two years, covering the time in 1844 when he attested the will. Surrebuttals were offered from others who had recently observed unusual behavior by Phelps; in one case it was claimed Phelps had been seen sitting motionless in a sleigh outdoors in the middle of winter for two hours. Nevertheless, Choate and the relatives ultimately lost their challenge to the will's validity.

== Office ==
The will was put into effect in 1859. Since then and as per its instructions, residents of each of eight towns in Hampshire County and Franklin County separately choose electors who, in turn, select a board of trustees to administer the provisions of the will. The Electors Under Will of Oliver Smith are public officials elected to renewable terms of one or two years on the general election ballot.

David Murphy, the Elector Under Will of Oliver Smith of Northampton, Massachusetts, is sworn into office in 2014

The Electors assemble annually in May and the citizens of any town whose Elector fails to attend this assembly for two successive years are disqualified from the benefits of the will. Should all towns be disqualified, the authority of the Electors is transferred to the General Court of Massachusetts and the will's benefits extended to all residents of Hampshire County. Vacancies among the board of trustees occurring between assemblies of the Electors are filled by appointment of a Hampshire County probate judge.

A portion of the Smith estate was spent soon after the settlement of the probate questions to found Smith Vocational and Agricultural High School. The remainder of the estate is a perpetual endowment whose proceeds are annually disbursed to fund the Smith Charities: a series of scholarships for vocational training and nursing education, nominal dowries paid to newlywed brides, and payments made for every minor child of a widow from one of the eight Elector towns upon the death of her husband.

== Seat of the Electors ==
The seat of the Electors Under Will of Oliver Smith is located at 51 Main Street in Northampton, Massachusetts, in a Victorian Renaissance structure designed by William Fenno Pratt and constructed by the Electors for their use in 1865.

== Amounts granted versus expenses ==
The Office of the Massachusetts Attorney General, Non-Profits & Charities Division online Form 990 for 2018 shows that the Smith Charities granted $17,223, had revenue of $171,415, expenses of $123,564, and assets of $4,340,408 - figures similar to 2017. In other words, grants were 13.9% of expenses. CharityWatch "considers a charity to be highly efficient when our end calculations produce a Program % of 75% or greater".

== See also ==
- Sophia Smith (niece of Oliver Smith and namesake of Smith College)
