= Sophia Smith (college founder) =

Founder of Smith College (1796–1870)

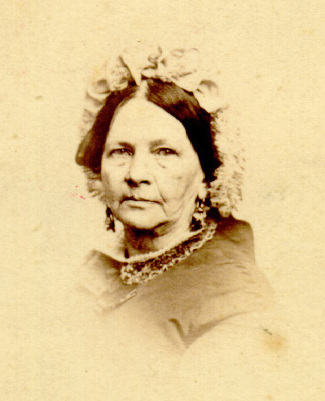
- Smith, 1868
- Born: August 27, 1796; Hatfield, Massachusetts, U.S.
- Died: June 12, 1870 (aged 73); Hatfield, Massachusetts, U.S.
- Known for: Founding Smith College

Sophia Smith (August 27, 1796 – June 12, 1870) founded Smith College in 1870 with the substantial estate she inherited from her father, who was a wealthy farmer, and her six siblings, who had all predeceased her.

An avid reader, Smith attended schools in Hatfield, Massachusetts, and Hartford, Connecticut. She later attended Hopkins Academy in Hadley, Massachusetts.

== Life ==
Born as the first daughter into a family of three boys, Sophia Smith soon became the caretaker for the following three children (all girls). A resident of Hatfield, Massachusetts, the 1800 census states that the town had 153 houses, 11 of which were owned by her relatives both on her father's (Smith) side and her mother's (White) side. After the death of her mother, the care of the household became the sole responsibility of her sister Harriet. After Harriet's death, she relied on her eldest brother, who acquired a sizable fortune. Smith accrued the fortune following his death in 1861, which she later used to found Smith College.

== Founding Smith College ==
Deaf since age 40 and unmarried, Smith initially considered endowing her fortune to an institute for the deaf, but changed her mind when the Clarke School for the Deaf opened in Northampton, Massachusetts, in 1868. Encouraged by the Reverend John Morton Greene, she decided to endow a women's college instead. Upon her death on June 12, 1870, her fortune of $387,468 was willed to endow Smith College, which was chartered in 1871 and opened its doors in 1875 with 14 students. She also left money for the establishment of Smith Academy, a coeducational high school in her hometown of Hatfield, Massachusetts.

=== The Last Will and Testament of Miss Sophia Smith ===
Beginning in the thirteenth section of her will, Smith outlines the provisions for what would soon become Smith College:

THIRTEENTH: I hereby make the following provisions for the establishment and maintenance of an Institution for the higher education of young women, with the design to furnish for my own sex means and facilities for education equal to those which are afforded now in our Colleges to young men.

It is my opinion that by the higher and more thorough Christian education of women, what are called their "wrongs" will be redressed, their wages adjusted, their weight of influence in reforming the evils of society will be greatly increased, as teachers, as writers, as mothers, as members of society, their power for good will be incalculably enlarged.

- Article I: This Institution shall be called THE SMITH COLLEGE.
- Article 2: After the payment of the legacies and bequests, made in the first four sections of this Will, and the Seventy Five Thousand (75,000,) Dollars for said Academy, I hereby appropriate the sum of Three Hundred Thousand, (300,000,) Dollars, if so much shall then remain of my Estate, for the establishment and maintenance of said College. Also whatever more there may be of my Estate than the said Three Hundred Thousand, (300,000,) Dollars, after the said payments at my decease, I hereby appropriate for the same object, that is to say, said excess shall be added to the said Three Hundred Thousand, (300,000,) Dollars, for the establishment and maintenance of said College, but if at my decease there shall not be remaining, after said payments, the sum of Three Hundred Thousand, (300,000,) Dollars, then I order and direct that whatever sum shall remain after said payments, shall be put at interest, until such time as it shall amount to Three Hundred Thousand, (300,000,) Dollars, after which said College shall be immediately founded and put in operation.
- Article 3: Sensible of what the Christian Religion has done for my sex, and believing that all education should be for the glory of God, and the good of man, I direct that the Holy Scriptures be daily and systematically read and studied in said College, and without giving preference to any sect or denomination, all the education and all the discipline shall be pervaded by the Spirit of Evangelical Christian Religion. I direct, also, that higher culture in the English Language and Literature be given in said College; also, in Ancient and Modern Languages, in the Mathematical and Physical Sciences, in the Useful and the Fine Arts, in Intellectual, Moral and Aesthetic Philosophy, in Natural Theology, in the Evidences of Christianity, in Gymnastics and Physical Culture, in the Sciences and Arts, which pertain to Education, Society, and Government, and in such other studies as coming times may develop or demand for the education of women and the progress of the race. I would have the education suited to the mental and physical wants of woman. It is not my design to render my sex any the less feminine, but to develop as fully as may be the powers of womanhood, and furnish women with the means of usefulness, happiness and honor, now withheld from them.
- Article 4: I appoint the following persons to be the first Trustees of said College, to-wit: Hon. Charles E. Forbes and Hon. Osmyn Baker, both of Northampton, Rev. John M. Greene, of South Hadley, Profs. Wm. S. Tyler, and Julius H. Seelye, both of Amherst, Hon. Wm. B. Washburn, of Greenfield, Prof. Edwards A. Park, of Andover, Hon. Joseph White of Williamstown, Rev. B. G. Northrop of New Haven, Conn., Hon. Edward B. Gillett of Westfield. and George W. Hubbard, of Hatfield.
- Article 5: The above-mentioned Trustees, and their associates and successors, shall have full power to increase their number, to fill vacancies, invest and expend this money, and to found and set in operation the Institution, as soon as may be after my decease, and order all its concerns, in such manner as they may judge best calculated to accomplish the objects before stated. Only I direct that not more than one-half of the sum appropriated by me to this object, shall be invested in buildings and grounds, the other half or more shall be invested by the Trustees in a safe manner, to be a permanent fund, the interest of which alone shall be used forever for furnishing teachers, library, and apparatus, for the higher education of young women, and for the general purposes and objects of the Institution.

It is my wish that the Institution be so conducted, that during all coming time it shall do the most good to the greatest number. I would have it a perennial blessing to the country and the world.

FOURTEENTH: I hereby order and direct that said College shall be located in the Town of Northampton, in the Commonwealth of Massachusetts, provided the citizens of said Town of Northampton shall within two years after the probate of this Will raise and pay over or cause to be raised and paid over to the said Charles E. Forbes and George W. Hubbard, Trustees as aforesaid, or the Board of Trustees of said College, if the same shall have been incorporated and organized, the sum of Twenty Five Thousand, (25,000,) Dollars, to be added to the permanent fund of said College, and subject to all the regulations, requirements and restrictions, hereinbefore made, for the investment and expenditure of said fund. But if said Twenty Five Thousand, (25,000,) Dollars shall not be raised and paid over as aforesaid, then I order and direct that said College shall be located in the Town of Hatfield, aforesaid, and the provisions and directions hereinbefore made for the establishment of said College, for its regulation and management, the investment and expenditure of its funds shall be applicable to the same so located in said Town of Hatfield.

== Awards and achievements ==
In 1942, the Sophia Smith Collection at Smith College was established as a repository of manuscripts, archives, photographs, periodicals, and other primary sources in women's history. Its first director was Margaret Storrs Grierson.

In 2000, Smith was inducted posthumously to the National Women's Hall of Fame.

== See also ==
- Elector Under Will of Oliver Smith
