= Old Mill Site Historic District =

Historic district in Massachusetts, United States

- U.S. National Register of Historic Places
- U.S. Historic district
- U.S. Historic district – Contributing property
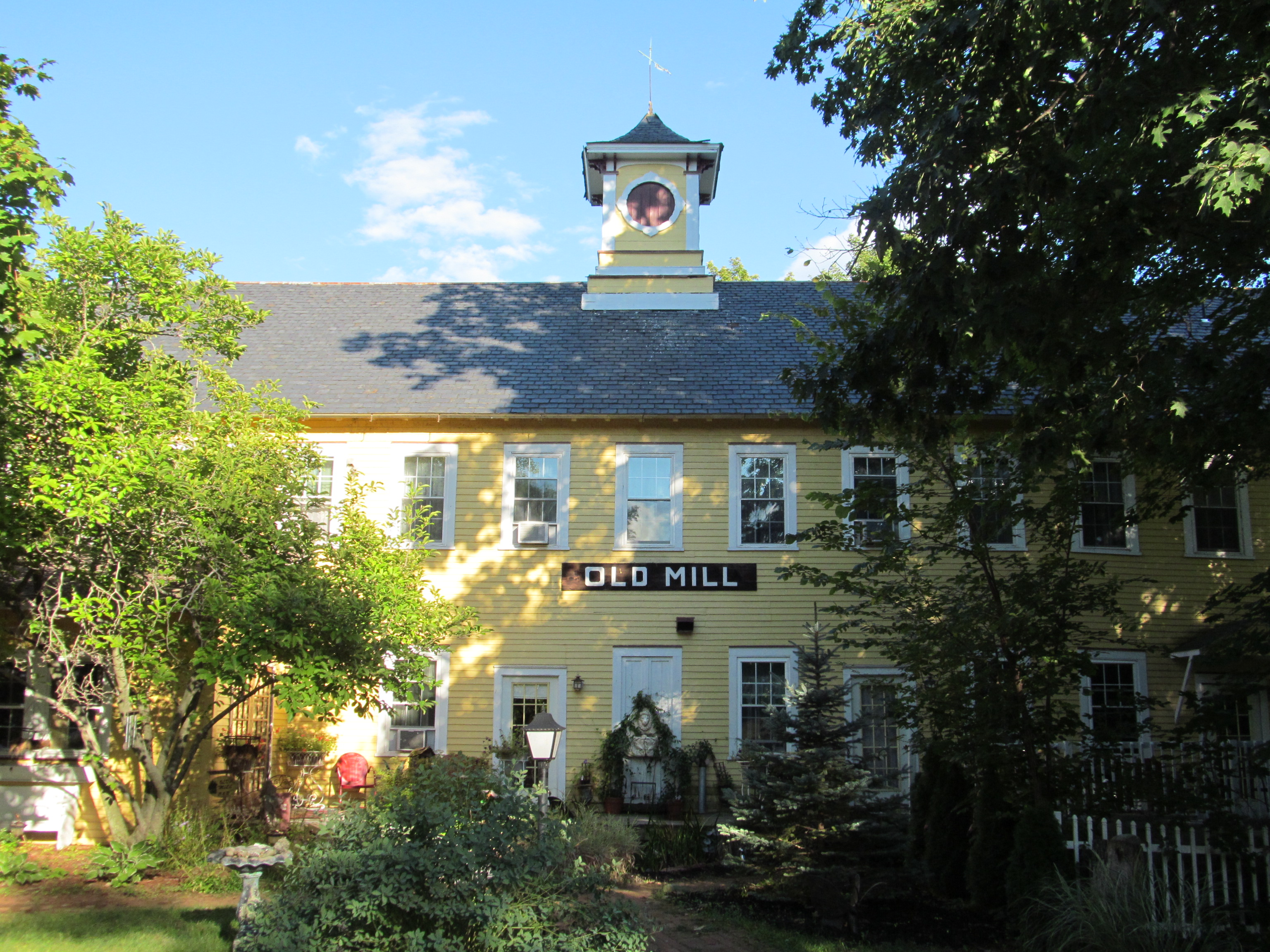
- Shattuck Gun Factory building

- Location within Massachusetts Location within the United States
- Location: 48 and 50 Prospect St., Hatfield, Massachusetts
- Coordinates: 42°22′16″N 72°35′49″W
- Area: 2.2 acres (0.89 ha)
- Built: 1881
- Part of: Mill-Prospect Street Historic District (ID02001188)
- NRHP reference No.: 82001911

Significant dates
- Added to NRHP: June 2, 1982
- Designated CP: October 22, 2002

The Old Mill Site Historic District in Hatfield, Massachusetts encompasses the site of a late 19th century mill. It is one of only two such sites in the town. The centerpiece of the district is the former Shattuck Gun Factory building (built 1881), which in 1989 housed newspaper offices and in 2006 a bed and breakfast. The district, which was listed on the National Register of Historic Places in 1982, includes three other elements: an 1891 Warren pony truss bridge across the Mill River, now closed to traffic, and a machine shop and garage (located across the river from the mill), both built in 1886. The district was also included in the larger Mill-Prospect Street Historic District in 2002.

The mill site has a history of industrial use since 1661, when Thomas Meekins was granted water rights on the falls, and established a grist mill. He eventually also built a sawmill. Additional mills were built in the early 19th century, including a sawmill which spanned the river. This site was one of Hatfield's major industrial employers in the 19th century. In 1865, the complex was adapted for the production of guns, first by Henry Porter and later by Charles Shattuck. Most of the existing buildings were destroyed in a fire, and Shattuck built the existing mill building in 1881.

The main mill building is a three-story wood-frame structure, with a gabled roof and clapboarded exterior. It is seventeen bays long and six wide, and is capped by a cupola with a pagoda-shaped roof. Its foundation is set partly in the river, with its water power provided through a penstock to a turbine chamber in the basement.

== See also ==
- National Register of Historic Places listings in Hampshire County, Massachusetts
