= Bradstreet Historic District =

Historic district in Massachusetts, United States

- U.S. National Register of Historic Places
- U.S. Historic district
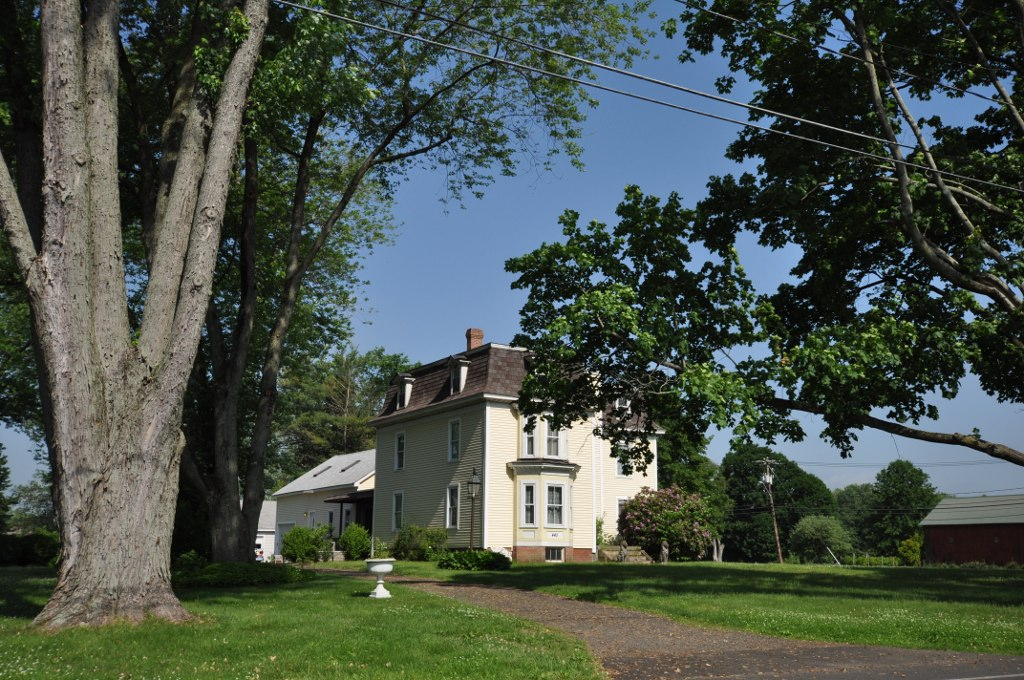

- Location within Massachusetts Location within the United States
- Location: Main St. & Depot Rd., Old Farm Rd., Hatfield, Massachusetts
- Coordinates: 42°24′19″N 72°35′26″W
- Area: 266 acres (108 ha)
- Architectural style: Greek Revival, Second Empire, Colonial Revival
- NRHP reference No.: 97000724
- Added to NRHP: July 17, 1997

The Bradstreet Historic District encompasses the rural 19th-century village of Bradstreet in Hatfield, Massachusetts. It is centered at the junction of Depot Road and Main Street, and includes properties lining those two streets and Old Farm Road. Most of the buildings in the area date to the second half of the 19th century, featuring architectural styles typical of the period, including Queen Anne, Second Empire, Italianate, and Colonial Revival. The village grew on land that was originally granted to colonial governor Simon Bradstreet and divided in 1682, and has remained largely agricultural since then. The district was listed on the National Register of Historic Places in 1997.

The Bradstreet village is located in northeastern Hatfield, occupying an area that is mostly within the floodplain of the Connecticut River just south of the border with Whately. Main Street and Depot Road are the principal roads in the area, the former roughly paralleling the river, and the latter extending west toward North Hatfield. Between Main Street and the river lie several farm access lanes, Old Farm Road and Bashin Road among then, that are mainly lined with agricultural buildings. A large number of these are barns for the curing of tobacco, a major crop in the region in the 19th and 20th centuries. Most of the built architecture of the area dates from the late 18th to early 20th century; the major exception is a 20th-century subdivision on Cronin Hill Road. The largest number of houses date to the mid-19th century, with a number of modestly styled examples of Greek Revival architecture. There are a few houses that are Italianate, and a larger set of Colonial Revival and Craftsman/Bungalow houses.

== See also ==
- North Hatfield Historic District
- Hatfield Center Historic District
- Upper Main Street Historic District (Hatfield, Massachusetts)
- National Register of Historic Places listings in Hampshire County, Massachusetts
