= Simeon Borden =

American inventor and engineer (1798–1856)

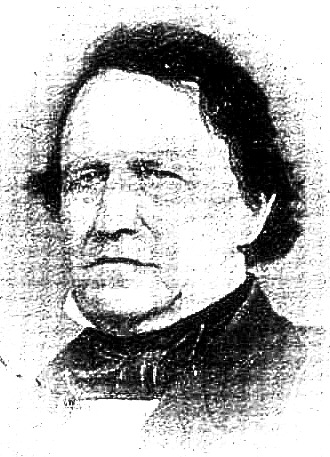
- Simeon Borden
- Born: January 29, 1798; Freetown, Massachusetts, US
- Died: October 28, 1856 (aged 58); Fall River, Massachusetts, US
- Occupation: land surveyor
- Known for: Borden Base Line

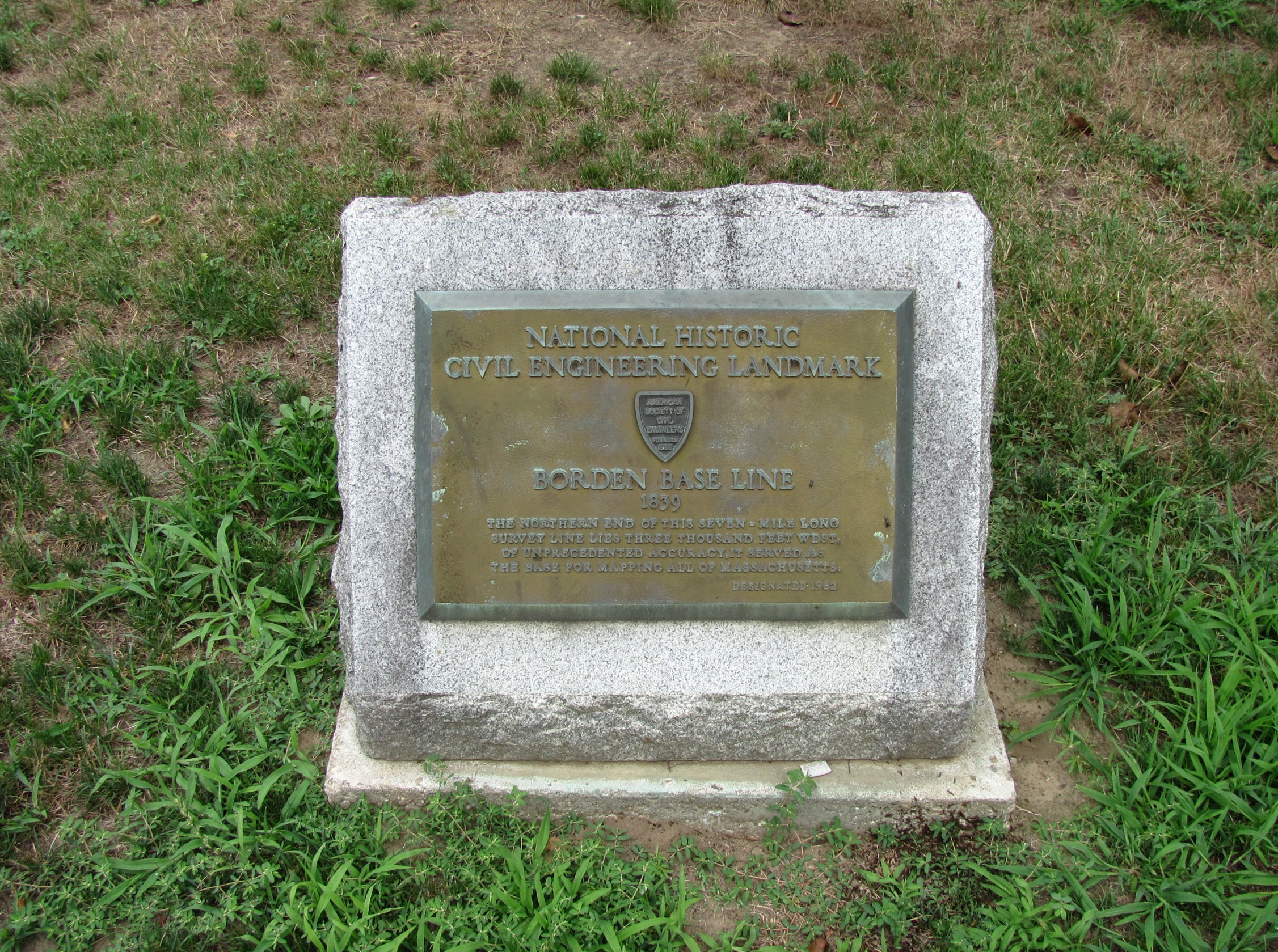
Borden Base Line plaque, South Deerfield, Massachusetts

Simeon Borden (January 29, 1798 – October 28, 1856) was an American inventor, engineer, and surveyor.

Borden was born in Freetown, now Fall River, Massachusetts, to Simeon and Amey Briggs Borden, he was the 4th great grandson of Richard and Joan (Fowle) Borden, who immigrated to Rhode Island from England in 1638. His younger brother Nathaniel Briggs Borden was an important businessman in the Fall River, Massachusetts and a United States Representative. Simeon received a limited education at Tiverton, Rhode Island, and studied geometry and applied mathematics on his own. He became a woodworker and metalworker, practiced surveying, and in 1828 headed up a machine-shop in Fall River.

In 1830 Borden invented a new apparatus for accurately measuring the base line for the upcoming Massachusetts' Trigonometrical Survey. It was 50 feet long, enclosed in a tube, and used with four compound microscopes. The tube and microscopes were mounted on trestles, and adjustable to any direction.

Borden's equipment was judged to be more accurate and convenient than any instrument available, and thus he assisted in measuring the Massachusetts base line (now known as the Borden Base Line) to a remarkable accuracy in 1831, and afterwards led the triangulation of the entire state from 1834 to 1841 as Superintendent of the Survey. He described this first geodetic survey in America in the ninth volume of the Transactions of the American Philosophical Society. In 1842, he was elected as a member of the American Philosophical Society.

Borden surveyed and marked the line between Rhode Island and Massachusetts after their disputed boundary had been tried before the United States Supreme Court in 1844. He then turned his attention to railroads and telegraphs. In 1851 he strung a telegraph wire, suspended on masts 220 feet high, across the Hudson River from the Palisades to Fort Washington, a distance of more than a mile.

Borden died a bachelor in Fall River on October 28, 1856.

Most, if not all, of the original field notes from Borden's trigonometric survey of Massachusetts are in the possession of the Massachusetts Association of Land Surveyors and Civil Engineers, Inc., One Walnut Street, Boston, Massachusetts.

== Selected works ==
- "An Account of the Trigonometrical Survey of Massachusetts", Transactions of the American Philosophical Society, Volume 9, 18, Part I.
- A System of Useful Formulae: adapted to the practical operations of locating and constructing Railroads, Boston : Charles C. Little & James Brown, 1851.
- Historical and Genealogical Record of the Descendants as Far as Known of Richard and Joan Borden, who Settled in Portsmouth, Rhode Island, May, 1638: With Historical and Biographical Sketches of Some of Their Descendants, Hattie Borden Weld, 1899.
- Simeon Borden, “Communication from the Trigonometrical Surveyor” in “1840 House Bill 0054. Report And Resolutions Adopted By The Legislature Of South Carolina In Relation To The Controversy Between The States Of Georgia And Maine; The Last Report Of The Trigonometrical Surveyor; …” (Commonwealth of Massachusetts, House of Representatives, 1840), available from State Library of Massachusetts, https://archives.lib.state.ma.us/handle/2452/749488, and https://archives.lib.state.ma.us/entities/archivalmaterial/21e2974b-a9fb-43d6-8099-2f72f51d7aad.
