= West Hatfield Historic District =

Historic district in Massachusetts, United States

- U.S. National Register of Historic Places
- U.S. Historic district
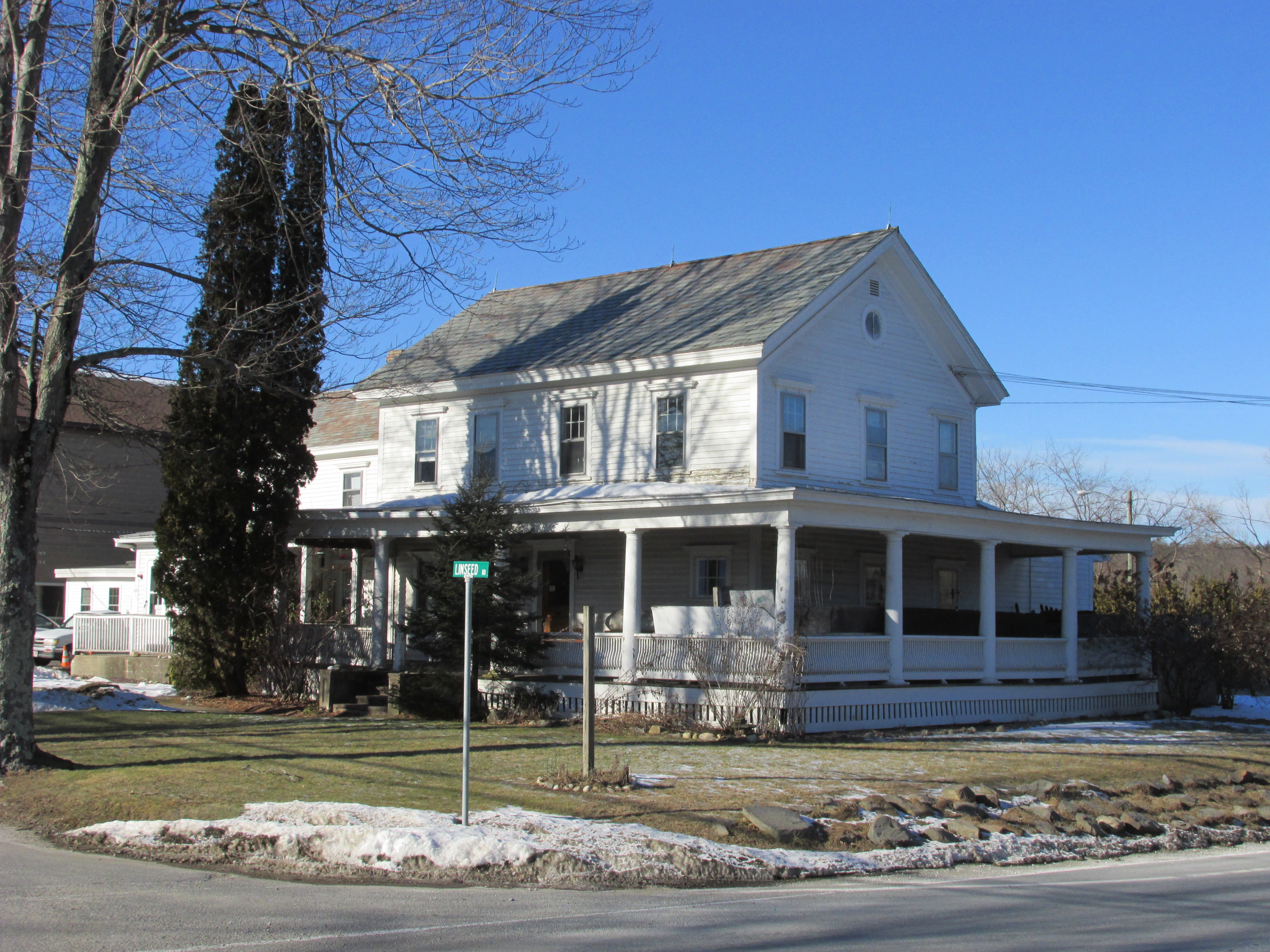
- Corner of Linseed Rd and West St

- Location within Massachusetts Location within the United States
- Location: Hatfield, Massachusetts
- Coordinates: 42°22′19″N 72°38′12″W
- Area: 30 acres (12 ha)
- Architectural style: Federal, Greek Revival
- NRHP reference No.: 05000079
- Added to NRHP: February 24, 2005

The West Hatfield Historic District encompasses the historic rural village center of West Hatfield, Massachusetts. It is centered on the junction of West Street (US Route 5) with Linseed Road and Church Avenue, and developed in the 19th century as a railroad-driven agricultural transportation center, populated mainly by immigrants. The district was listed on the National Register of Historic Places in 2005.

== Description and history ==
West Hatfield is located at the edge of Hatfield's western rural uplands, known locally as The Rocks, and is isolated from the town's other population centers by the intervention of Interstate 91. It is a cluster of buildings scattered primarily along Route 5; Church Avenue, which used to be a route to the eastern parts of town, was cut off by the construction of the highway, and also has several houses of historical interest. The oldest properties in the district date to the 1830s, but most of the village's 23 contributing structures date to the early decades of the 20th century.

The village did not begin to take shape until the railroad was built through the area (and away from Hatfield's other population centers) in the 1840s. It became one of the main depots through which the town's agricultural products (tobacco in particular) made their way to market, and developed as a bustling village centered around the station. The area was settled by several waves of immigrants, all mainly engaged in agriculture, from central and eastern Europe. In the early 20th century, the village also acquired the trappings of early roadside commerce, of which a few examples still survive.

== See also ==
- Hatfield Center Historic District
- North Hatfield Historic District
- Bradstreet Historic District
- Mill-Prospect Street Historic District
- National Register of Historic Places listings in Hampshire County, Massachusetts
