= Hatfield (CDP), Massachusetts =

Hatfield, Massachusetts
- Census-designated place
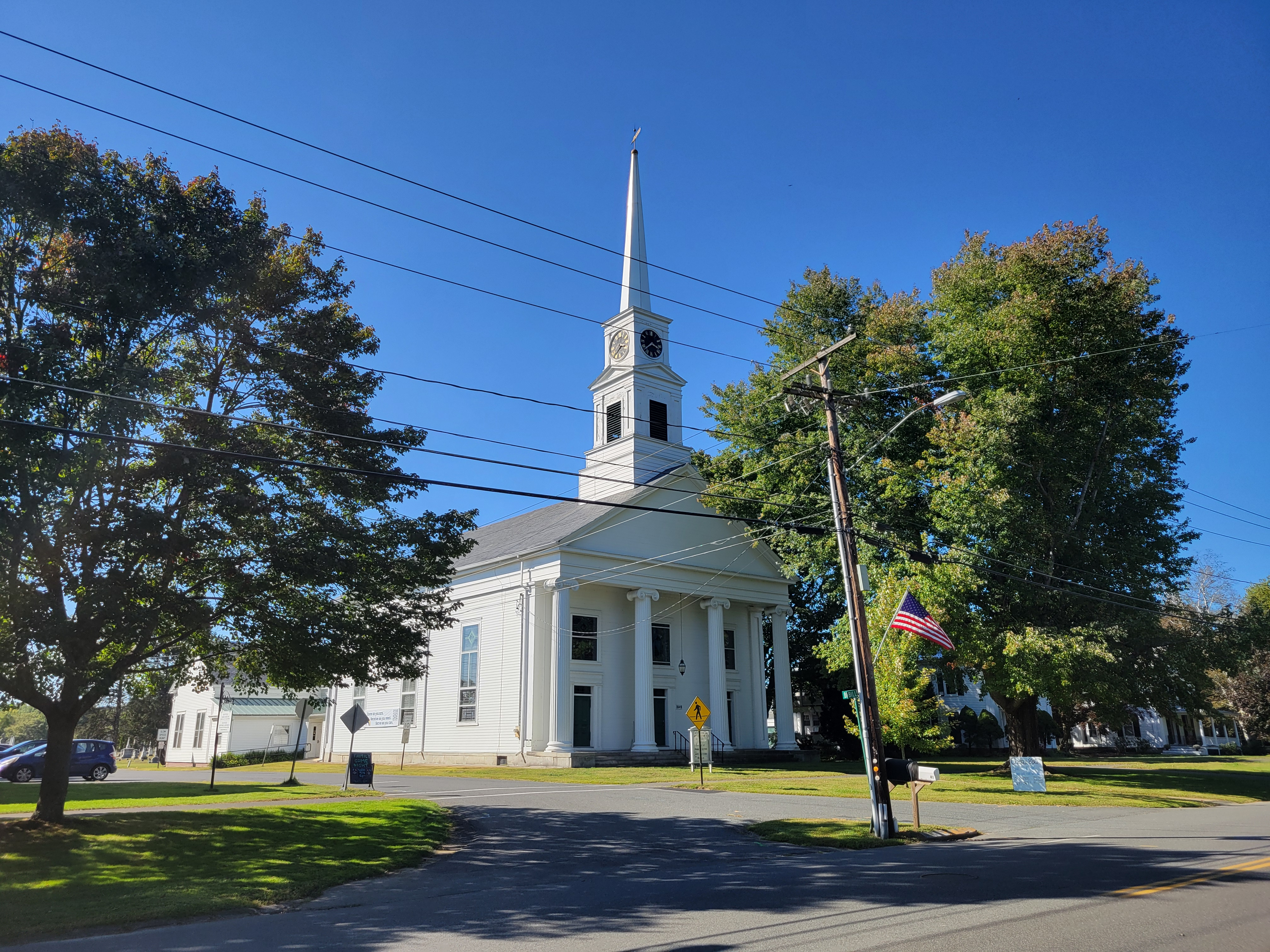
- First Congregational Church

- Location in Hampshire County in Massachusetts
- Coordinates: 42°22′11″N 72°36′20″W
- Country: United States
- State: Massachusetts
- County: Hampshire
- Town: Hatfield

Area
  - Total: 2.54 sq mi (6.57 km^{2})
  - Land: 2.45 sq mi (6.34 km^{2})
  - Water: 0.085 sq mi (0.22 km^{2})
- Elevation: 121 ft (37 m)

Population (2020)
  - Total: 1,453
  - Density: 593.2/sq mi (229.02/km^{2})
- Time zone: UTC-5 (Eastern (EST))
  - Summer (DST): UTC-4 (EDT)
- ZIP code: 01038
- Area code: 413
- FIPS code: 25-29230
- GNIS feature ID: 0609017

Hatfield is a census-designated place (CDP) comprising the main village in the town of Hatfield in Hampshire County, Massachusetts, United States. The population of the CDP was 1,318 at the 2010 census, out of a total town population of 3,279. It is part of the Springfield, Massachusetts Metropolitan Statistical Area.

== Geography ==
The Hatfield CDP is located in the southern part of the town of Hatfield at 42°22′11″N 72°36′20″W (42.369665, -72.605426). The CDP includes the village of Hatfield, on the west bank of the Connecticut River, as well as residential land to the west along Elm Street as far as Dwight Street and Little Neponset Road and to the north as far as Cow Bridge Brook.

Interstate 91 passes 2 miles (3 km) west of the center of Hatfield, with access from Exit 21 at Elm Street. The CDP is 6 miles (10 km) northeast of the center of Northampton and 24 miles (39 km) north of Springfield.

According to the United States Census Bureau, the CDP has a total area of 2.4 square miles (6.2 km^{2}), of which 2.4 square miles (6.2 km^{2}) are land and 0.1 square miles (0.2 km^{2}), or 3.53%, are water.

== Demographics ==
Historical population
Census	Pop.	Note	%±
2020	1,453		—
U.S. Decennial Census

As of the census of 2000, there were 1,298 people, 566 households, and 336 families residing in the CDP. The population density was 214.2 people/km^{2} (555 people/mi^{2}). There were 585 housing units at an average density of 96.5 units/km^{2} (250 units/mi^{2}). The racial makeup of the CDP was 98.07% White, 0.15% Black or African American, 0.77% Asian, 0.85% from other races, and 0.15% from two or more races. Hispanic or Latino of any race were 1.23% of the population.

There were 566 households, out of which 27.4% had children under the age of 18 living with them, 50.0% were married couples living together, 7.1% had a female householder with no husband present, and 40.5% were non-families. 32.3% of all households were made up of individuals, and 17.7% had someone living alone who was 65 years of age or older. The average household size was 2.29 and the average family size was 2.96.

In the CDP, the population was spread out, with 21.6% under the age of 18, 4.2% from 18 to 24, 28.0% from 25 to 44, 25.8% from 45 to 64, and 20.4% who were 65 years of age or older. The median age was 43 years. For every 100 females, there were 86.0 males. For every 100 females age 18 and over, there were 83.6 males.

The median income for a household in the CDP was $48,281, and the median income for a family was $63,833. Males had a median income of $39,167 versus $31,477 for females. The per capita income for the CDP was $23,145. None of the families and 2.4% of the population were living below the poverty line, including no under eighteens and 4.5% of those over 64.
