= Smith Academy (Massachusetts) =

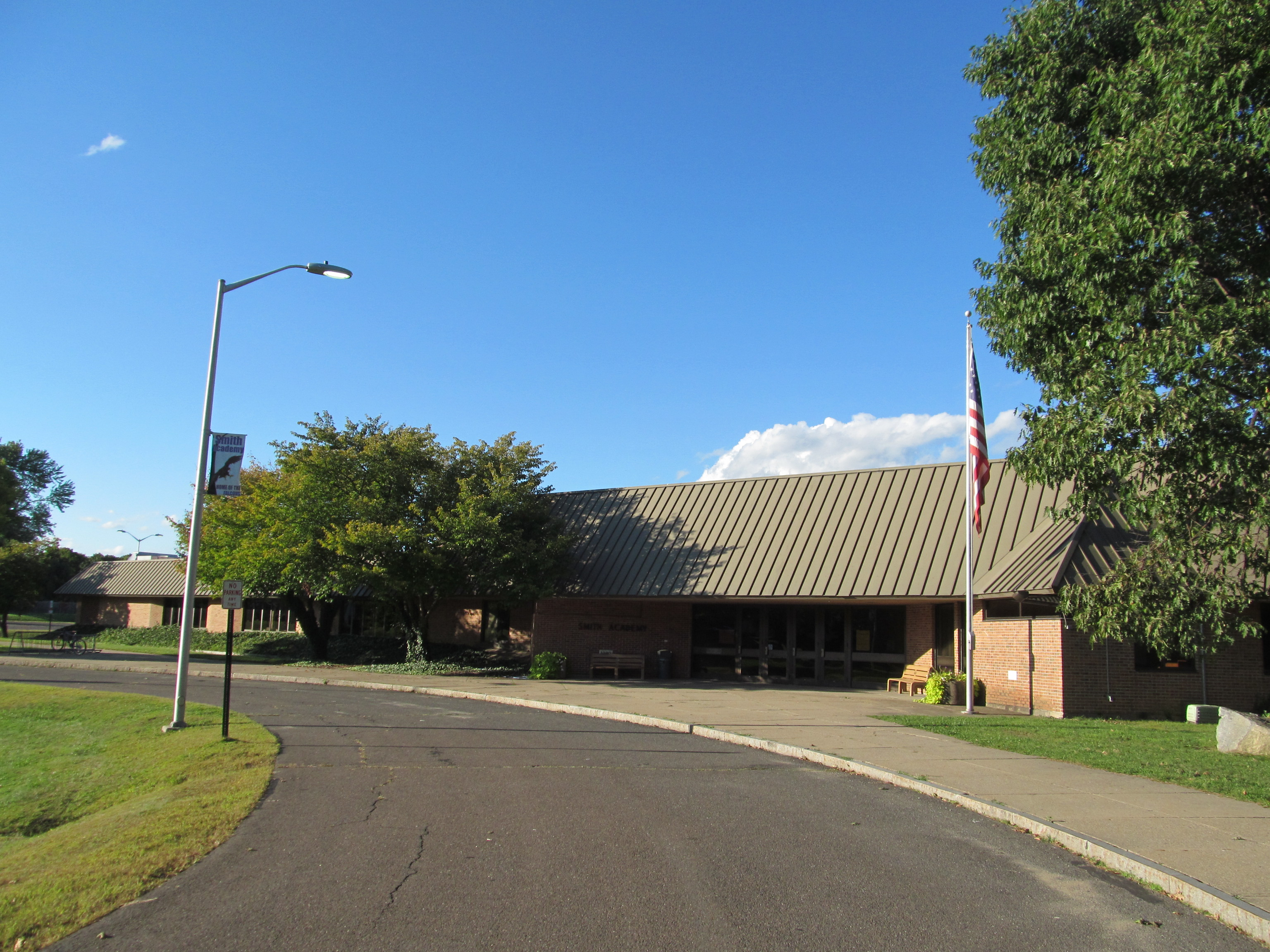
- Smith Academy in 2012

Location
- 34 School Street; Hatfield, Massachusetts 01038; United States; 42.377267°N 72.600403°W

Information
- School type: Public school Open enrollment
- Established: 1872
- School district: Hatfield Public Schools
- CEEB code: 220970
- Principal: Dr. Conor Driscoll
- Teaching staff: 18.3 (FTE) (as of 2007-08)
- Grades: 7-12
- Enrollment: 198 (as of 2007-08)
- Student to teacher ratio: 10.8 (as of 2007-08)
- Colors: Purple and white
- Mascot: Falcon
- Team name: Falcons
- Website: https://www.hatfieldps.net/apps/pages/index.jsp?uREC_ID=563695&type=d

Smith Academy, a combination junior and senior high, is a small public school in Hatfield, Massachusetts, United States.

== Notable alumni ==
- Jack Hubbard, College Football Hall of Fame inductee
- Judy Strong, Olympic field hockey player
- Robert J. Ryan, Sr., US Ambassador to Niger
