= Borden Base Line =

Historic survey line in Massachusetts

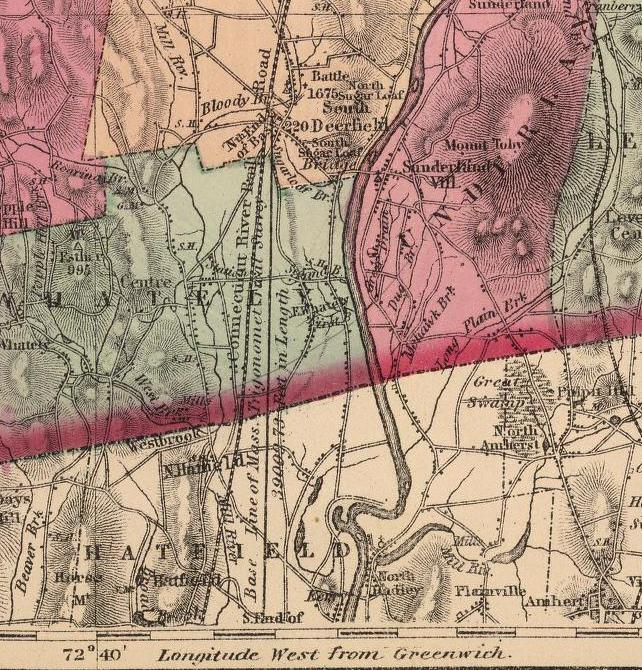
Borden Base Line

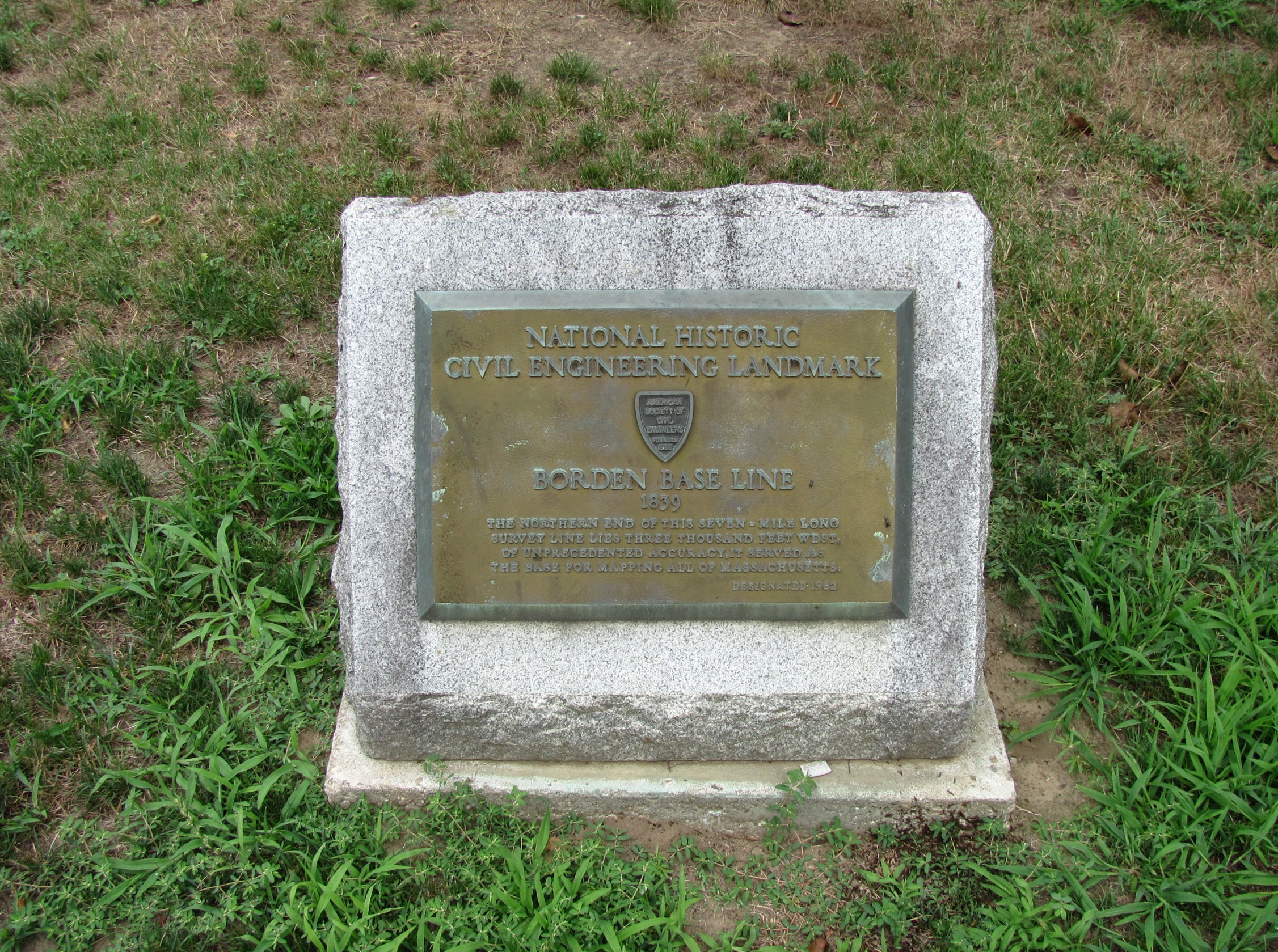
American Society of Civil Engineers plaque at the Tilton Library in South Deerfield

The Borden Base Line is a historic survey line (7.42 miles, 39,009.73 feet (11,890.17 m) long) running north–south through Hatfield and South Deerfield, Massachusetts. It was completed in 1831. It was designated a National Historic Civil Engineering Landmark by the American Society of Civil Engineers in 1981.

The baseline measurement was the first project of its kind undertaken in America, and essential for Massachusetts' pioneering Trigonometrical Survey, performed under chief engineer Robert Treat Paine. Its careful measurement was critical since the accuracy of the whole triangulation network depended on it.

The baseline was measured with greater accuracy than previously possible by using a new measuring device invented by Simeon Borden, which employed a bi-metallic measuring instrument to provide constant readings despite temperature variations. His apparatus was 50 feet (15 m) long, enclosed in a tube, and employed with four compound microscopes.

Borden was a highly competent engineer whose ability was widely recognized. Indeed, the entire project became generally known as the Borden Survey. He measured the baseline with a nominal accuracy of better than one part in 5 million. As Professor A. D. Butterfield has written, "The work performed and results obtained far surpassed in magnitude and attainment of any previous work of this kind in America."

It appears that the north end of the baseline lies just south of the intersection of today's Route 116 and Route 5 in South Deerfield, Massachusetts. According to the Valley Historians, the south end is still marked by a copper plug set into a boulder, located in the back yard of the house at 30 Bridge Street, Hatfield, Massachusetts.

== See also ==
- Surveying
