= Mill–Prospect Street Historic District =

Historic district in Massachusetts, United States

- U.S. National Register of Historic Places
- U.S. Historic district
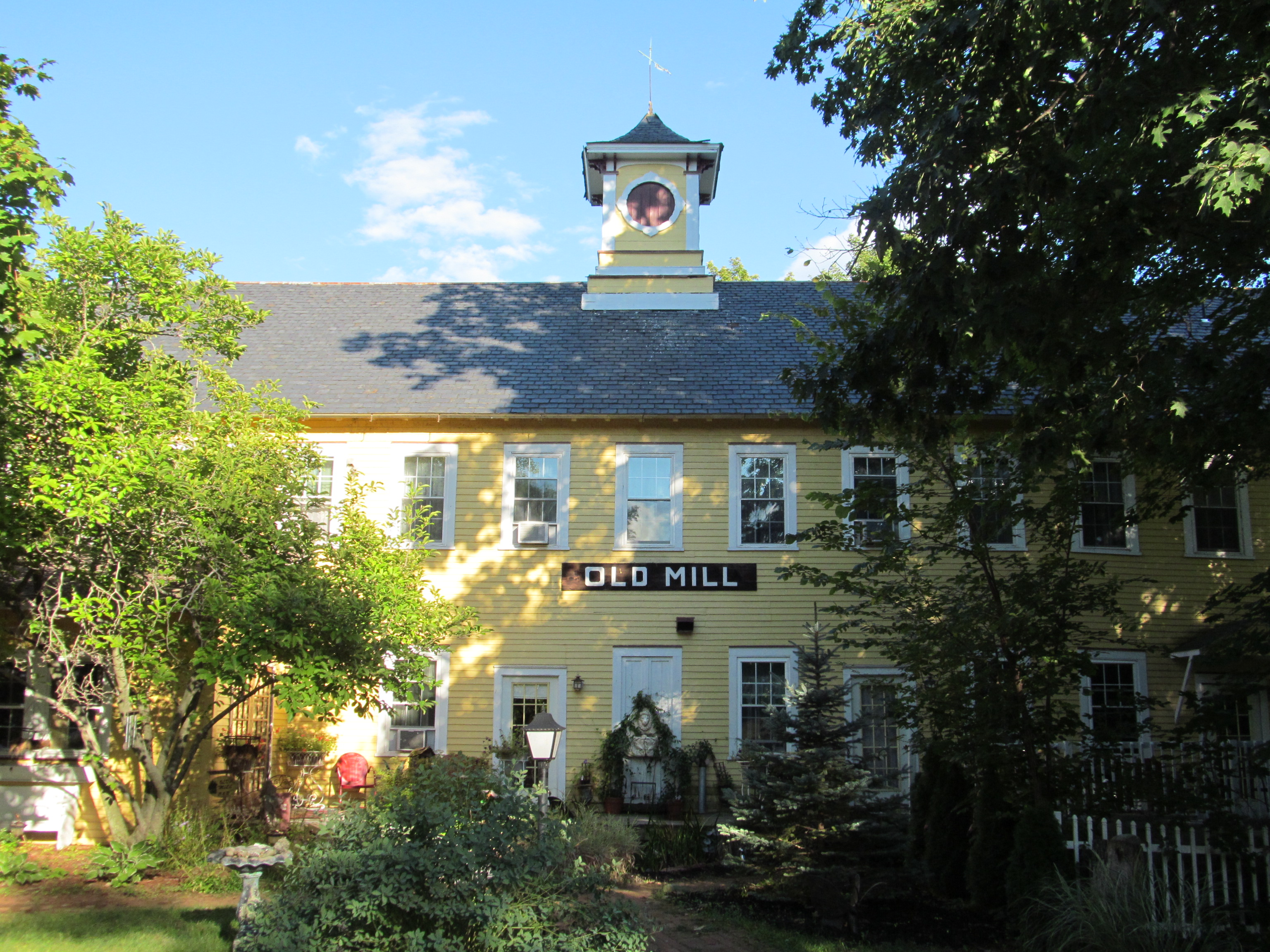
- Old Mill

- Location within Massachusetts Location within the United States
- Location: Hatfield, Massachusetts
- Coordinates: 42°22′31″N 72°36′47″W
- Architectural style: Greek Revival, Late Victorian
- NRHP reference No.: 02001188
- Added to NRHP: October 22, 2002

The Mill–Prospect Street Historic District in Hatfield, Massachusetts encompasses a historic landscape with over 300 years of industrial and agricultural history. It was listed on the National Register of Historic Places in 2002. The district runs along Prospect Street, a north-south road that roughly bisects Hatfield, from its southern end at Elm Street to a point north of its junction with Chestnut Street, and includes properties on adjacent roadways. The central focus of the district is the Mill River, which meanders from west to east across the district's middle. At the Prospect Street crossing is a cluster of former late 19th century industrial buildings, some of which comprise the Old Mill Site Historic District, listed in 1982.

== History ==
The area was first settled by English colonists in the 17th century, and it is known that a gristmill stood in the area near the Prospect Street crossing of the river in 1661. Water powered industry operated in that area from then until the 1970s. The rest of the district was agricultural, and the early millworks have not survived. Interest in the area picked up in the early decades of the 19th century; there were houses depicted on a 1794 survey, but none survive. Bridge Street, built by 1830, running west from the mill area, brought increased traffic and development. In 1830 the area was also used in the first formal geographical survey of the state: one end of the Borden Base Line is located in the district demarcated by a buried marker off Bridge Street.

The district's height of growth came in the second half of the 19th century. A significant number of homes lining Prospect Street are in styles typical of the period, and it is when the surviving industrial properties, the Shattuck Gun Factory (now the Old Mill Inn) being the most notable. Also built at that time was a Warren pony truss bridge, which carried Prospect Street across the Mill River until it was closed for safety reasons.

== See also ==
- National Register of Historic Places listings in Hampshire County, Massachusetts
