= North Hatfield Historic District =

Historic district in Massachusetts, United States

- U.S. National Register of Historic Places
- U.S. Historic district
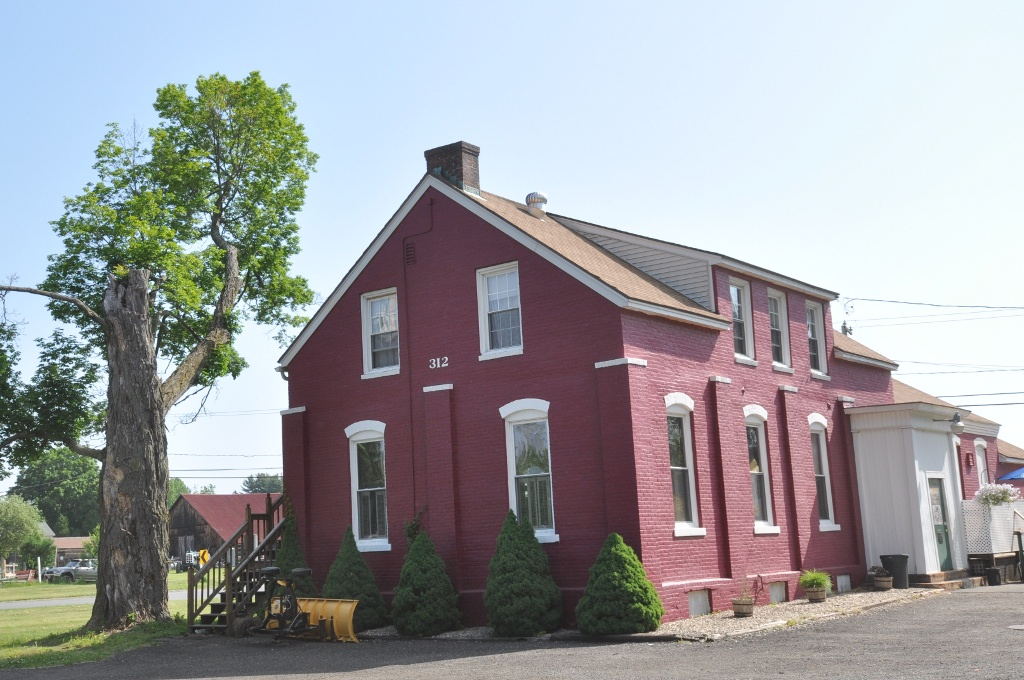

- Location within Massachusetts Location within the United States
- Location: Roughly along West St. and Depot Rd. Between I-91 and MA 10, Hatfield, Massachusetts
- Coordinates: 42°24′33″N 72°37′26″W
- Area: 64.5 acres (26.1 ha)
- Architectural style: Greek Revival, Italianate, Second Empire
- NRHP reference No.: 97000879
- Added to NRHP: October 30, 1997

The North Hatfield Historic District encompasses a small rural village in Hatfield, Massachusetts. It consists of a small cluster of buildings along West Street (United States Route 5) and Depot Road in the vicinity of a former railroad station. It includes a few buildings associated with the railroad, including a depot and freight buildings, as well as commercial and residential structures, most of which postdate the 1848 arrival of the railroad. The village was important in the community as an arrival point for immigrants working in its fields and industry. The district was listed on the National Register of Historic Places in 1997.

== Description and history ==
Hatfield was settled in the 17th century and incorporated in 1670. The North Hatfield area was basically undeveloped land for sometime, seeing some agricultural development in the 18th century. The area saw an increase in population beginning in the 1850s, when the railroad was built through the area, and a stop was placed at what is now called Depot Road. Construction of the railroad brought an influx of Irish and French Canadian immigrants, who worked on the railroad and in some cases remained to settle the area. North Hatfield also thrived as a small village center based on the transshipment of agricultural goods from farmers across northern Hatfield to market, and by the delivery of goods such as coal to them. A number of small industries were developed, powered by the Mill River. The village survived the decline of the railroads and the rise of the road system, with United States Route 5 continuing to serve as a major transportation route. Area farmers and village suffered during the Great Depression, from which the village never really recovered.

The historic district covers 64.5 acres (26.1 ha), centered on the junctions of US 5 with Depot Road and North Hatfield Street. Most of the architecture in the village is vernacular wood frame residential construction, built on a modest scale. Some buildings exhibit nods to popular architectural styles, such as the c. 1848 former post office on Depot Road, which has some Italianate and Greek Revival features. The principal civic building in the village is the North Hatfield District School, an Italianate brick building built in 1871 that has been converted to commercial use.

== See also ==
- Hatfield Center Historic District
- West Hatfield Historic District
- National Register of Historic Places listings in Hampshire County, Massachusetts
