= Hatfield, Massachusetts =

- Town
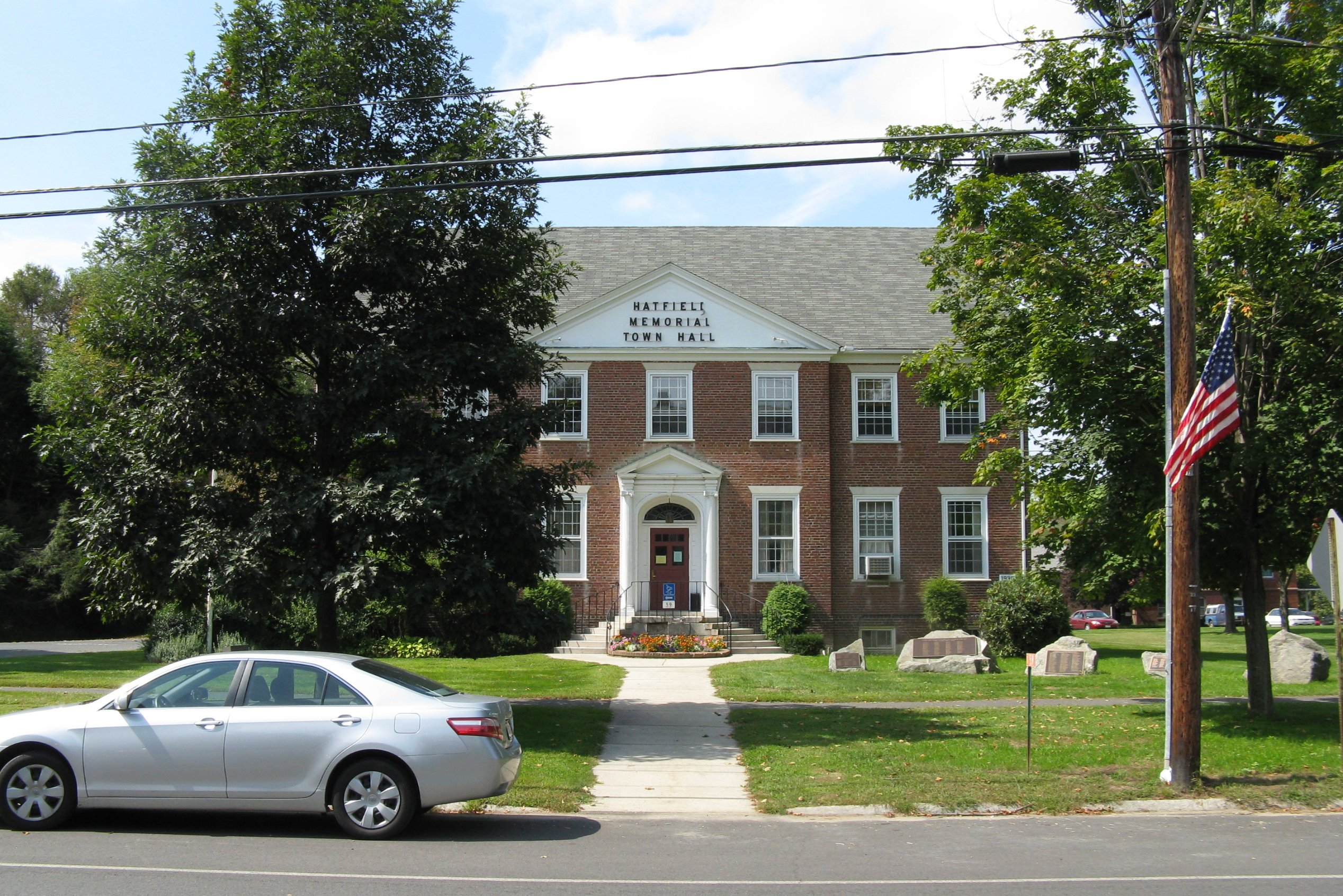
- Hatfield Memorial Town Hall

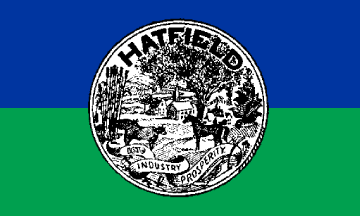
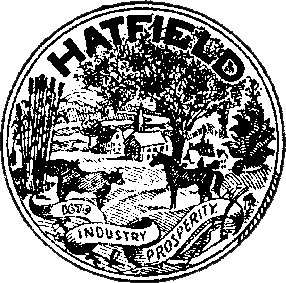
- Flag Seal
- Motto(s): Industry, Prosperity
- Location in Hampshire County in Massachusetts
- Coordinates: 42°22′15″N 72°35′55″W
- Country: United States
- State: Massachusetts
- County: Hampshire
- Settled: 1661
- Incorporated: 1670

Government
  - Type: Open town meeting

Area
  - Total: 16.8 sq mi (43.6 km^{2})
  - Land: 15.9 sq mi (41.2 km^{2})
  - Water: 0.93 sq mi (2.4 km^{2})
- Elevation: 128 ft (39 m)

Population (2020)
  - Total: 3,352
  - Density: 211/sq mi (81.4/km^{2})
- Time zone: UTC−5 (Eastern)
  - Summer (DST): UTC−4 (Eastern)
- ZIP Codes: 01038 (Hatfield); 01066 (North Hatfield); 01088 (West Hatfield)
- Area code: 413
- FIPS code: 25-29265
- GNIS feature ID: 0618202
- Website: www.townofhatfield.org

Hatfield is a town in Hampshire County, Massachusetts, United States. The population was 3,352 at the 2020 census. It is part of the Springfield, Massachusetts Metropolitan Statistical Area. The census-designated place of Hatfield consists of the town center and surrounding areas.

== History ==
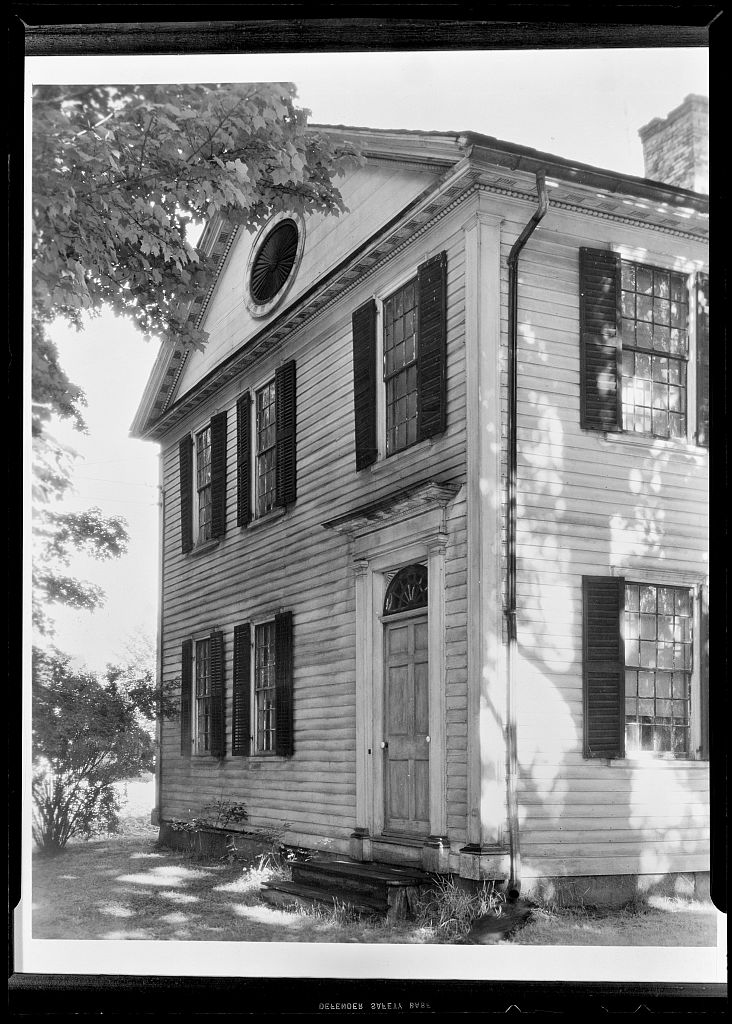
Cornelia Billings House, Hatfield

Hatfield was founded in 1660 on land granted to General Daniel Dennison and Governor William Bradford. It was formally incorporated as a town in 1670 and has a board of selectmen and an annual town meeting.

During the late 1650s, the church in Hartford fell into a bitter dispute over the "Half Way Covenant," a newly-adopted Puritan policy surrounding granting partial membership to children of non or partial members.

A group of strict-constructionist Puritans decided to break away entirely. Between 1659 and 1661, they packed up and moved north, initially settling on the east side of the Connecticut River in Hadley. However, the dispute crossed the river with them, and thus roughly two dozen families crossed to the west side of the river.

One of the theories of Hatfield's incorporation in 1670 was that during that time it was a colony of Hadley and Hadley's church was located across the Connecticut River on what is now West Street in present-day Hadley. The citizens living in what is now Hatfield asked the officials if they could build the church on the west side of the river, so that they could go to church and not have to cross the river, which was hard to cross every week, especially during the winter season when the river would freeze. When the citizens asked main Hadley, Hadley said "No." Enraged, they held a vote on whether Hatfield would still remain territory of Hadley, or secede into its own town. The vote for secession won. Many believed this was a good decision as during that time, travel was not easy, and it was very unusual for the already large Hadley, which had already claimed many of its surrounding towns, to have a spot on the west side of the river.

As a center for agriculture, the region produced cattle, sheep, corn, and tobacco. At first their relations with the local Native Americans were very welcoming on both sides. On October 16, 1675, a substantial part of the town was destroyed in the Raid on Hatfield during King Philip's War, and surviving settlers sought refuge in Springfield. On September 19, 1677, another raid occurred, killing thirteen and resulting in seventeen hostages being taken to Canada. After nine months, the surviving hostages were ransomed and returned to Hatfield.

During the American Revolution, Hatfield was an important source of supplies and men for the rebels. In 1786, the town was used as an assembly area for the discontented who became involved in Shays' Rebellion.

One family supplied many of Hatfield's physicians for generations. The Hastings family, descendants of English Puritan immigrant Thomas Hastings, was originally settled at Watertown, but within a generation members of the family had relocated to Hatfield, where they produced a succession of Hatfield physicians, including Dr. Thomas Hastings (1652–1712); Dr. Thomas Hastings (1679–1728); Dr. Waitstill Hastings (1714–1748); and Dr. John Hastings (1765–1845). The first Thomas Hastings, aside from serving as physician to Hatfield and surrounding communities, was also the town's first schoolteacher. He authored a contemporary account of the devastating 1704 Indian attack on nearby Deerfield.

Hatfield was the birthplace and hometown of Sophia Smith (1796–1870), the founder of both Smith Academy (the Hatfield public high school), and Smith College, the famous women's college in Northampton. Another notable resident was Rebecca Dickinson (1738–1812), a never-married gownmaker whose surviving diary, preserved in the collections of the Pocumtuck Valley Memorial Association in Deerfield, has served as the basis for scholarship in early American women's history.

== Geography ==
Hatfield is located on the west bank of the Connecticut River at the mouth of the Mill River, 25 miles (40 km) north of Springfield and about 100 miles (160 km) west of Boston. It is bordered to the west by Horse Mountain (a typical New England granite glacial remnant) and the town of Williamsburg, to the north by the town of Whately, to the east and south across the Connecticut River by the town of Hadley, and to the southwest by the city of Northampton. The village of Hatfield is in the southern part of the town, next to the Connecticut River, while the villages of Westbrook, North Hatfield, and Bradstreet are near the northern border. West Hatfield is in the southwest part of town, next to the Northampton border.

U.S. Route 5/Route 10 and Interstate 91 pass through the town, with access to I-91 from Exits 27 and 30, where it intersects with US 5/Route 10. The village of Hatfield is approximately 2 miles (3 km) east of Routes 5 and 91.

According to the United States Census Bureau, the town of Hatfield has a total area of 16.8 square miles (43.6 km^{2}), of which 15.9 square miles (41.2 km^{2}) are land and 0.93 square miles (2.4 km^{2}), or 5.51%, are water.

== Demographics ==
Historical population
Year	Pop.	±%
1790	703	—
1850	1,073	+52.6%
1860	1,337	+24.6%
1870	1,594	+19.2%
1880	1,495	−6.2%
1890	1,246	−16.7%
1900	1,500	+20.4%
1910	1,986	+32.4%
1920	2,651	+33.5%
1930	2,476	−6.6%
1940	2,216	−10.5%
1950	2,179	−1.7%
1960	2,350	+7.8%
1970	2,825	+20.2%
1980	3,045	+7.8%
1990	3,184	+4.6%
2000	3,249	+2.0%
2010	3,279	+0.9%
2020	3,352	+2.2%
2022*	3,314	−1.1%
* = population estimate.

As of the census of 2000, there were 3,249 people, 1,381 households, and 871 families residing in the town. The population density was 202.8 inhabitants per square mile (78.3/km^{2}). There were 1,431 housing units at an average density of 89.3 per square mile (34.5/km^{2}). The racial makeup of the town was 98.03% White, 0.22% Black or African American, 0.12% Native American, 0.49% Asian, 0.06% Pacific Islander, 0.58% from other races, and 0.49% from two or more races. Hispanic or Latino of any race were 1.05% of the population.

There were 1,381 households, out of which 27.6% had children under the age of 18 living with them, 53.1% were married couples living together, 7.5% had a female householder with no husband present, and 36.9% were non-families. 29.3% of all households were made up of individuals, and 13.8% had someone living alone who was 65 years of age or older. The average household size was 2.35 and the average family size was 2.96.

In the town, the population was spread out, with 20.7% under the age of 18, 5.4% from 18 to 24, 27.2% from 25 to 44, 29.9% from 45 to 64, and 16.7% who were 65 years of age or older. The median age was 43 years. For every 100 females, there were 95.0 males. For every 100 females age 18 and over, there were 90.7 males.

The median income for a household in the town was $50,238, and the median income for a family was $61,607. Males had a median income of $39,414 versus $35,042 for females. The per capita income for the town was $24,813. About 1.4% of families and 2.8% of the population were below the poverty line, including 1.2% of those under age 18 and 6.1% of those age 65 or over.

== School system ==
Hatfield has two public schools: an elementary school and a high school. Hatfield Elementary school ranges from grades Pre-K to 5. The high school, Smith Academy, is grades 6–12; with just over 130 students, it is the smallest public school in the state of Massachusetts.

== Points of interest ==
- Borden Base Line
- Mill-Prospect Street Historic District
